= Sorelianism =

Advocacy for the ideas of Georges Sorel

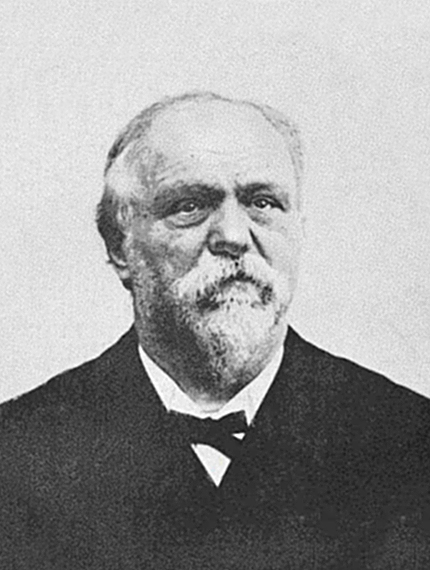
French philosopher and sociologist Georges Sorel (1847-1922)

Sorelianism is advocacy for the support of the ideology and thinking of Georges Sorel, a French revolutionary syndicalist. Sorelians oppose bourgeois democracy, the developments of the 18th century, the secular spirit, and the French Revolution, while supporting Classicism. Offering a revisionist interpretation of Marxism, Sorel believed that the victory of the proletariat in class struggle could be achieved only through the power of myth and a general strike. To Sorel, the aftermath of class conflict would involve rejuvenation of both the bourgeoisie and the proletariat.

With the seeming failure of syndicalism, Sorel announced his abandonment of socialist literature in 1910, and claimed in 1914, using an aphorism of Benedetto Croce, that "socialism is dead" due to the "decomposition of Marxism". He became a supporter of Charles Maurras-style integral nationalism (maurrassisme) beginning in 1909, which he believed had similar moral aims to syndicalism despite being enemies materially. In this sense, Sorelianism can be considered a precursor to fascism. However, Sorel became disillusioned with these ideas with World War I, and from 1918 until his death in 1922, became a supporter of the Russian Revolution and communism, believing them to be a revival of syndicalism.

== Concepts ==
=== General strike and syndicalist society ===
Although starting out as a Marxist, Sorel eventually rejected what he considered to be the orthodox Marxist elevation of history as determined. He considered the challenge of the rising social sciences to be new moral criterion. Pierre-Joseph Proudhon had believed that a just society could only come about through action, and in particular opposition to an enemy; following this line, Sorel believed that class war between the proletariat and the bourgeoisie would result from a general strike, which, together with the betterment of living conditions, he considered distinct from the mere aim of state distribution, and as the material and moral essence of Marxism and socialism.

Sorel had problems with Proudhon, and he seems to have sought to detach it of its idealism, as Proudhon had detached justice from power play, that is, from class relations. Otherwise only minimally influencing him, in admiration of Friedrich Nietzsche, Sorel held that an imperialist working class would establish a new aristocracy, which he said was "organizing relations among men for the benefit of its sovereignty" and as a sole source of law. He also believed that proletarian violence would strengthen the bourgeoisie, and focused on the moral regeneration of society and the rescue of civilization rather than only the working class, considering socialism a means for revolutionary transformation of society rather than a movement of the proletariat or a movement in itself.

=== Individualism and myth ===
Sorel considered the myth of the general strike a social basis for authority providing coherence to syndicalism. He believed there to be a close relation between conflict and freedom. He opposed what he described as the "splendid isolation" of totalitarian movements connecting all activities to party fronts. Against Nietzsche's Übermensch, he compared the general strike with what he called the "apocalyptic myths", or "Yankee Protestantism", of the practical, individualistic American settler ready for any venture, with neither impinging on the freedom of the individual.

Inspired by liberal institutions and the pluralist writings of William James, he denounced imitation of the military corps, extolling a warrior-individualism comparable to the "American spirit", "animated with the spirit of liberty". Against the idea of centralized imperium, he espouses a Proudhonian balance and devotion to the weak based on family love, which he believed needed to be part of the warrior ethic. Combined with an ethic of labour, it was this that would enable freedom.

=== Class conflict and rejuvenation ===
Sorel advocated the separation of groups in society, including support of the syndicalist model of a society where the proletarian workers would be autonomous and separate from bourgeois industrialists. He refused class collaboration, or the idea of a negotiation between the classes during the period of struggle between the proletariat against the bourgeoisie. At the same time, he believed that it was the proletariat's task to awaken the bourgeoisie from intellectual stupor to recover its morality and what he said was its "productive energy", as well as the "feeling of its own dignity" that Sorel stated to have been lost because of democratic ideals. Hence, Sorel believed that class conflict would in the end result in the rejuvenation of both the bourgeoisie and the proletariat.

=== Revision of Marxism ===
Sorel focused on the ethical dimension of Marxism, arguing for its utility for historical analysis and a means for transforming society. But he criticized what he considered to be the deterministic, materialist, and mechanist components of Marxism. Sorel criticized vulgar Marxism, or vulgar interpretations of Marxism that he said were being unfaithful to Karl Marx's real intentions. Sorel argued that Marx was not materialist at all, observing that Marx did not regard psychological developments of people as part of the economic process. Sorel also commented that Marx described the necessary ideological superstructure of societies: law, the organization of the state, religion, art, and philosophy. As a result, Sorel stated that "no great philosophy can be established without being based on art and on religion".

Sorel stated that although Marx had initially denounced Proudhon while supporting Blanquism, that Marx later synthesized ideas from both Blanquism and Proudhonism together. Sorel supported the crisis of Marxism thesis that Marxism had undergone in the 1880s and the 1890s when major socialist parties were being founded in France. Sorel viewed non-Proudhonian socialism as being wrong-headed and corrupt, as being inherently oppressive. Referencing Croce, Sorel stated that a "decomposition of Marxism", as referring to the major goals and themes of the ideology, was being caused by Marx's Blanquist elements and Friedrich Engels' positivist elements. Proudhonism was in Sorel's view more consistent with the goals of Marxism than Blanquism, which had become popular in France, and Sorel argued that Blanquism was a vulgar and rigidly deterministic corruption of Marxism.

== Influence ==
=== French integral nationalism ===
Interest in Sorelian thought arose in the French political right, particularly by Charles Maurras, a French nationalist of Action Française, and his supporters. While Maurras was a staunch opponent of Marxism, he was supportive of Sorelianism for its opposition to liberal democracy. Maurras famously stated that "a socialism liberated from the democratic and cosmopolitan element fits nationalism well as a well made glove fits a beautiful hand." In the summer of 1909, Sorel endorsed French integral nationalism and praised Maurras. Sorel was impressed by the significant numbers of "ardent youth" that enrolled in Action Française. Sorel's turn to nationalism resulted in his disregarding of Marx in favour of the views of Proudhon. In 1910, Sorel, along with Action Française nationalists Édouard Berth and Georges Valois, agreed to form a journal titled La Cité française that would promote a form of national syndicalism; however, this was abandoned. Afterwards, Sorel supported another nationalist newspaper, L'Indépendance, and began writing antisemitic content claiming that France was under attack from "Jewish invaders". In 1911, on the issue of Sorelian syndicalism, Valois announced to the Fourth Congress of Action Française: "It was not a mere accident that our friends encountered the militants of syndicalism. The nationalist movement and the syndicalist movement, alien to another though they may seem, because of their present positions and orientations, have more than one common objective."

During his association with French nationalism, Sorel joined Valois in the Cercle Proudhon, an organization that Valois declared to provide "a common platform for nationalists and leftist antidemocrats". The organization recognized both Proudhon and Sorel as two great thinkers who had "prepared the meeting of the two French traditions that had opposed each other throughout the nineteenth century: nationalism and authentic socialism uncorrupted by democracy, represented by syndicalism". Cercle Proudhon announced that it supported the replacement of bourgeois ideology and democratic socialism with a new ethic of an alliance of nationalism with syndicalism, as they claimed those "two synthesizing and convergent movements, one at the extreme right and the other at the extreme left, that have begun the siege and assault on democracy." Cercle Proudhon supported the replacement of the liberal order with a new world that was "virile, heroic, pessimistic, and puritanical—based on the sense of duty and sacrifice: a world where the mentality of warriors and monks would prevail". The society would be dominated by a powerful avant-garde proletarian elite that would serve as an aristocracy of producers, and allied with intellectual youth dedicated to action against the decadent bourgeoisie.

=== Italian Fascism ===
Mussolini, when he was a member of the Italian Socialist Party, held various positions towards Sorelianism at times. Mussolini stated that he became a syndicalist during the 1904 Italian general strike; his close contact with syndicalists dates to 1902. Mussolini reviewed Sorel's Reflections on Violence in 1909 and supported Sorel's view of consciousness as being a part of protracted struggle, where people display uplifting and self-sacrificing virtues akin to the heroes of antiquity. Mussolini also supported the Sorelian view of the necessity of violence in revolution. He followed Sorel in denouncing humanitarianism and compromise between revolutionary socialists and reformist socialists and bourgeois democrats. By 1909, Mussolini supported elitism and anti-parliamentarism, and became a propagandist for the use of what he called "regenerative violence". When Sorelians initially began to come close to identifying themselves with nationalism and monarchism in 1911, Mussolini believed that such association would destroy their credibility as socialists.

Upon Sorel's death, an article in the Italian Fascist doctrinal review Gerarchia edited by Benito Mussolini and Agostino Lanzillo, a known Sorelian, declared: "Perhaps Fascism may have the good fortune to fulfill a mission that is the implicit aspiration of the whole oeuvre of the master of syndicalism: to tear away the proletariat from the domination of the Socialist party, to reconstitute it on the basis of spiritual liberty, and to animate it with the breath of creative violence. This would be the true revolution that would mold the forms of the Italy of tomorrow."

=== Other socialists ===
Aside from Sorel himself, there were a number of adherents of Sorelianism in the early 20th century. Sorel was a mentor to Hubert Lagardelle who, like Sorel, supported the segregation of social classes and who despised the bourgeoisie, democracy, democratic socialism, parliamentarism, social democracy, and universal suffrage. Antonio Gramsci was influenced by the Sorelian views of social myth. Based on influence from Sorel, Gramsci asserted that Italy and the West have suffered from crises of culture and authority due to what he described as the "wave of materialism" and the inability of liberalism to achieve consensus and hegemony over society. Sorel was also a major influence on the early works of György Lukács, although Lukács later dismissed Sorel as petty bourgeoisie. Sorel influenced Greek philosopher Nikos Kazantzakis in Kazantzakis' belief of strife as being creative while viewing peace as decadent. José Carlos Mariátegui was a Sorelian who argued that Vladimir Lenin was a Sorelian and Nietzschean hero.

== See also ==
- National syndicalism
- Sansepolcrismo
