= La Nouvelle Librairie =

The Nouvelle Librairie nationale, rebranded as La Nouvelle Librairie in 2018, was a bookstore located at 11 Rue de Médicis, in the 6th arrondissement of Paris.

Opened in July 2018 under the leadership of François Bousquet with an identitarian, far-right orientation, the bookstore ultimately closed again in May 2024 due to financial difficulties.

== History ==
=== Predecessor ===
The Nouvelle Librairie nationale initially specialized in nationalist publications, offering a catalog of nearly 300 titles critical of the Third Republic.

Initially associated with the monarchist Action Française, under Georges Valois it became the birthplace of the Cercle Proudhon an effort to attract individuals from socialism and revolutionary syndicalism.

After founding Le Faisceau in 1925, Georges Valois severed ties with Charles Maurras and Action française. The Nouvelle Librairie nationale became Valois's property, renamed Librairie Valois, and briefly served as a publishing house for Le Faisceau authors and fascist theorists (1925–1928). By 1927, Valois distanced himself from fascism, pivoting the bookstore towards social and economic theory until its closure in 1932 during the Great Depression.

=== Reopening and Diversification ===
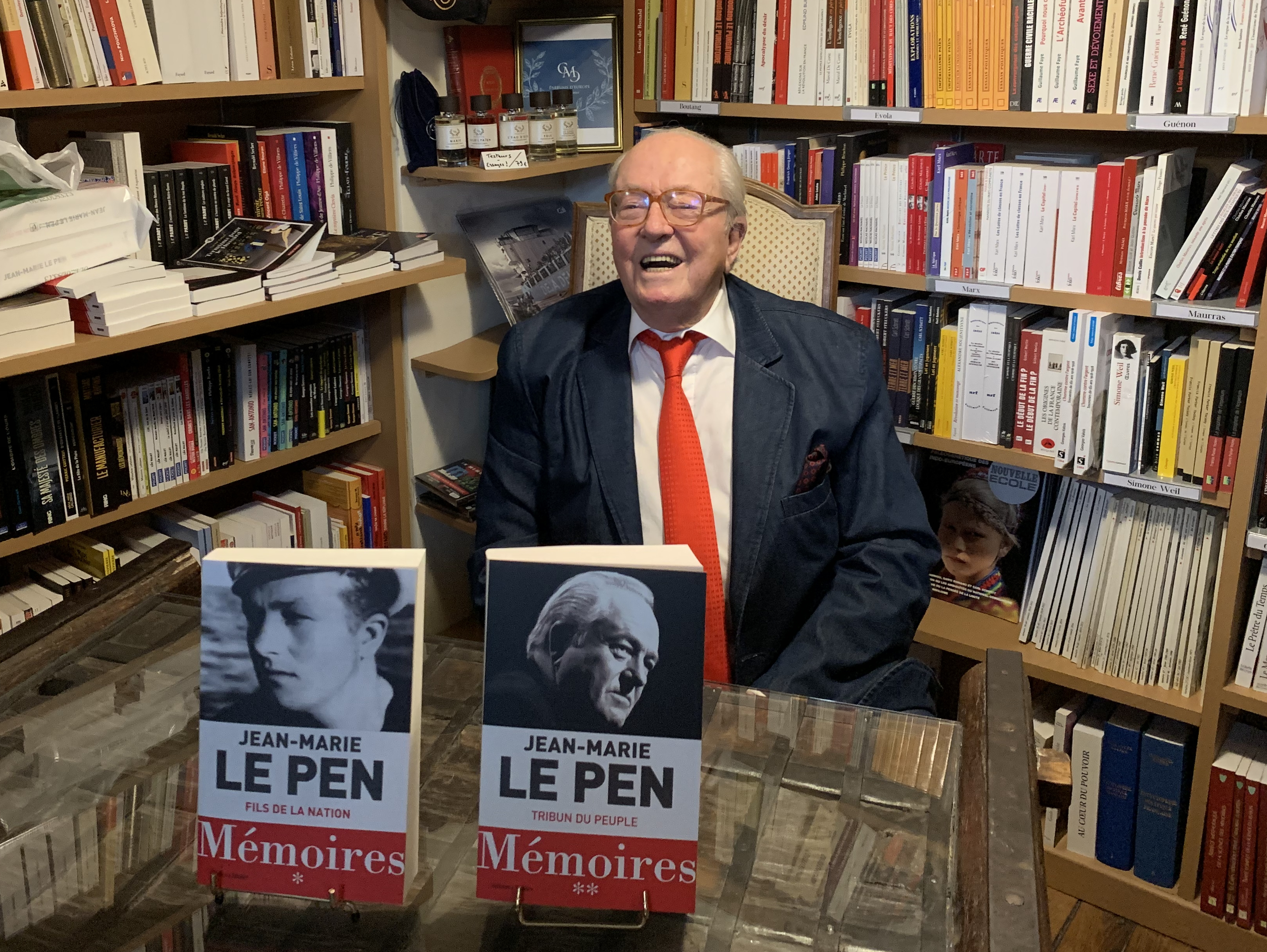
Jean-Marie Le Pen at a book signing for his Mémoires in October 2019.

In July 2018, the bookstore reopened at 11 Rue de Médicis under the name La Nouvelle Librairie, spearheaded by François Bousquet. Supported by the journal Éléments, the bookstore also drew on inventory from the former Facta bookstore, associated with Emmanuel Ratier.

The bookstore faced multiple acts of vandalism.

In April 2024, François Bousquet announced the impending closure of the bookstore. Financial challenges led to its final closure on May 28, 2024.

==== Éditions de La Nouvelle Librairie ====
In August 2019, the Éditions de La Nouvelle Librairie was established, gaining prominence within identitarian right-wing circles with over 100 titles published by 2022.

In 2022, plans to publish Derniers écrits avant le massacre, a collection by Gabriel Matzneff, were canceled due to "death threats" against staff, as announced by the publisher.

== See also ==
- L'Action française
- Bernard de Vesins
- Revue d'Action française
- Nouvelle Droite
