= Republican Syndicalist Party =

French political party from late 1920s to mid 1930s

Republican Syndicalist Party Parti républicain syndicaliste
- Leader: Georges Valois
- Founder: Georges Valois
- Founded: June 10, 1928
- Dissolved: Early-mid 1930s
- Preceded by: Faisceau
- Newspaper: Chantiers coopératifs
- Ideology: National syndicalism Revolutionary nationalism
- Political position: Far-right

The Republican Syndicalist Party (Parti républicain syndicaliste, PRS) was a French political party founded on June 10, 1928, by Georges Valois following the dissolution of the fascist Faisceau party. The PRS counted among its members Charles Albert, a former anarchist who had turned neo-Jacobin, Jacques Arthuys, Hubert Bourguin and René Capitant, a future left-wing Gaullist. Although it was close to fascism and to some far-right leagues, the PRS later joined the left-wing, and several of its members, including Georges Valois himself, took part in the French Resistance. It is representative of the French non-conformist movement of the 1930s.

The PRS published a press organ, the Cahiers Bleus which published at the Librairie Valois edition its first numero on 15 August 1928 and its 119th and last issue on 23 May 1932, during the Second Cartel des gauches (Left-wing Coalition). The Cahiers Bleus were a monthly and bi-monthly, with the subtitle "Pour la république syndicale: organe de culture générale et d'organisation"" (For the Trade-Unions' Republic: Organ of Culture générale and Organisation"). Its aim was to develop a new economy, founded on trade unions and corporatism. Collaborators to the Cahiers Bleus included Edouard Berth, who had co-founded the Cercle Proudhon with Valois, Marcel Déat, a future neo-socialist excluded from the French Section of the Workers' International (SFIO) and then collaborationist, Bertrand de Jouvenel, co-founder of the liberal Mont Pelerin Society, and Pierre Mendès France, future Prime minister during the Fourth Republic, from the young guard (jeunes loups) of the Radical-Socialist Party. The Cahiers bleus became the Chantiers coopératifs (Co-operative Workshops ?), then followed by the Cahiers bleus. 2e serie. (1931-1932).
