= Proto-fascism =

Ideologies and cultural movements forming the basis of fascism

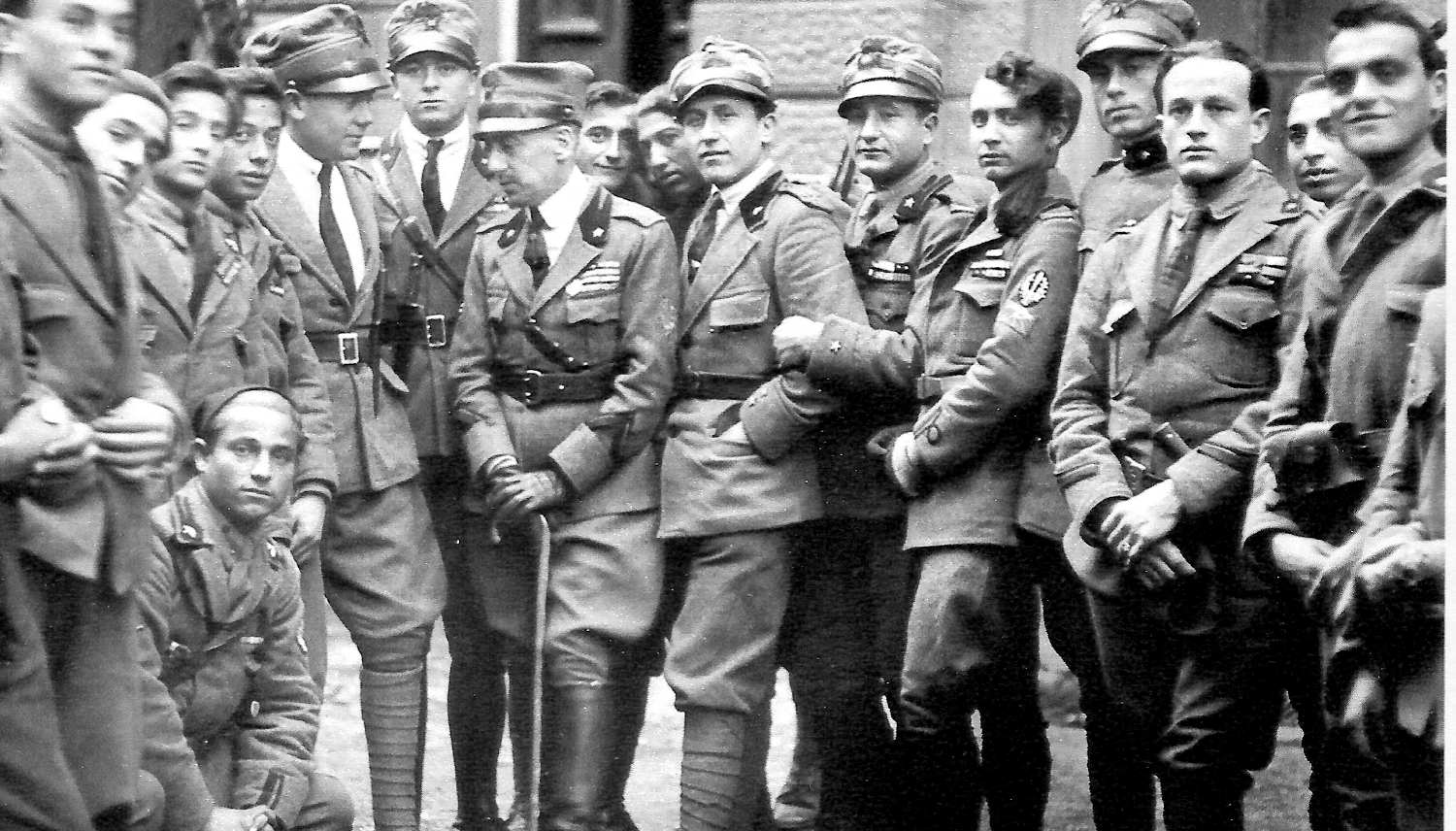
Gabriele d'Annunzio, a prominent Italian proto-fascist (centre; with the cane), with his Arditi in the Italian Regency of Carnaro in 1919

Proto-fascism represents the direct predecessor ideologies and cultural movements that influenced and formed the basis of fascism. The term protofascism is also used in a slightly more general sense to refer to any political movement whose activities make the emergence of fascism more likely.

Proto-fascist movements that preceded fascism featured some of the common characteristics of fascist ideology, such as the scapegoating of ethnic or religious minorities, the glorification of violence, the belief that the party and the state should have a single leader with absolute power, but usually did not exhibit some characteristics of fascism, for example, were less radical or lacked totalitarian ambitions.

In relation to contemporary politics, the term protofascist has been applied to movements which resemble fascist ones in certain respects, but cannot be defined strictly as neo-fascist.

== Historical movements ==
=== Finland ===
The Finnish Civil War "offered a concrete arena for violent struggle, and the reprisals and purges following the war gave an opportunity to try to create a new society through redemptive violence": Finnish proto-fascists were invariably members of the anti-communist White Guard. The White Guard ideologue and proponent of eugenics Martti Pihkala (1882–1966) is considered a clear example of proto-fascism. Fascism researcher Roger Griffin also described the Finnish irredentist Academic Karelia Society as proto-fascist.

=== France ===
French proto-fascism emerged from late-19th-century Fin de siècle nationalist, xenophobic and anti-liberal currents that prefigured interwar fascist leagues. The Dreyfus affair galvanized antisemitic and anti-parliamentary forces, offering rhetoric and organizational models for the far right. Thinkers like Georges Sorel created an anti-bourgeois cult of violence and myth, while Charles Maurras's Action Française fused integral nationalism, monarchism and hostility to the French Republic. Aforementioned movements—along with Boulangism, the Cercle Proudhon, and revolutionary syndicalism—laid the ideological groundwork for later fascist leagues like the Faisceau, Croix-de-Feu, the Parti Populaire Français, and for events such as the 6 February 1934 crisis.

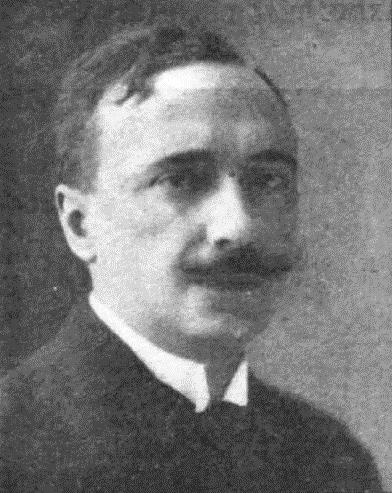
Georges Valois, a French national syndicalist and later self-identified French fascist of France's first official fascist party, the Faisceau

=== Germany ===
In Germany, the Völkisch nationalist movement which arose in the late 19th century became seen as one of the precursors of Nazi fascism; among the important elements of Völkisch culture was Blut und Boden romanticism. After World War I, the proto-fascist movements of the Weimar Republic included the Freikorps militias, which combatted the leftists between the German Revolution of 1918 and the Nazi seizure of power (see Political violence in Germany in 1918–1933), the Stahlhelm, a revanchist and authoritarian nationalist World War I veteran organization, the German National Association of Commercial Employees (Deutschnationaler Handlungsgehilfen-Verband, DHV), the German National People's Party (Deutschnationale Volkspartei, DNVP) from 1931 onwards. Many of these paramilitaries merged into the NSDAP's paramilitaries, such as the Sturmabteilung and Schutzstaffel after the Nazi seizure of power.

=== Italy ===
A prominent proto-fascist figure is Gabriele D'Annunzio, the best-known Italian poet of the first half of the 20th century, and an Italian nationalist whose politics influenced Benito Mussolini and Italian fascism. After World War I, D'Annunzio led a group of Arditi volunteers who occupied the port of Fiume and proclaimed the Italian Regency of Carnaro. The Italian Nationalist Association (Associazione Nazionalista Italiana, ANI), which advocated for an authoritarian corporatist nationalist state is also considered an influential proto-fascist organization. The Italian futurist movement in arts and culture, led by such figures as Filippo Tommaso Marinetti, also displayed certain key characteristics of Fascism, such as radical nationalism and cult of violence, destruction, and war.

The Italian Nationalist Association (Associazione Nazionalista Italiana, ANI) was a pioneer of proto-fascism in Italy, establishing the ideological and paramilitary foundations that Benito Mussolini would later consolidate. Founded in 1910 by figures such as Enrico Corradini and Alfredo Rocco, the ANI rejected liberalism and parliamentary democracy in favour of an authoritarian state and a corporatist economy. Its paramilitary wing, the Blue Shirts (Camicie Azzurre), predated the fascist Blackshirts and engaged in political violence to promote Italian irredentism and colonial expansion. While the ANI was initially more elitist and monarchist than the early mass-based fascist movement, its theories on the "proletarian nation" and the necessity of a totalitarian structure provided the intellectual backbone for the regime. The association's role as a proto-fascist force was cemented in 1923 when it merged into the National Fascist Party (PNF), integrating its leadership and paramilitary squads directly into the fascist state apparatus.

=== Japan ===
According to some scholars, Japan, which has a tradition of obedience, cooperation, and solidarity, already had at least a proto-fascist and proto-totalitarian spirit, so unlike Italy and Germany, it was able to adopt a totalitarian attitude without radical change in the late 1930s.

During the Meiji era, there was a clash between liberal Ōka shugi (欧化主義), which advocated for Western-style modernization, and nationalist/anti-Western Kokusui shugi (国粋主義), which was critical of modernization; the latter later became the ideological foundation of Japanese fascism or Kokka shugi (国家主義) and is regarded as proto-fascism. Kokusui shugi is based on the theory of kokutai (国体論) and absolutizes the Emperor of the ikkei and the people/nation (国民) as a historical community.

Gen'yōsha (founded in 1879), and the Black Dragon Society (founded in 1901), are representative proto-fascist organizations.

=== Spain ===
The historians Paul Preston and Julián Casanova, who treat Francoism as a Spanish variant of fascism, note that "Spanish fascism" was established by the unity of the right-wing groups and parties and the military rebels, which formed the Nationalist faction of the Spanish Civil War. According to them, the Spanish anti-republican right which would later support the rebellion, including the cultural association Acción Española which propagated the idea of an anti-republican military uprising, the nationalist authoritarian corporatist party CEDA, the organization Spanish Renovation, and the Carlist Requetés, shared a political culture, similar to the Italian proto-Fascism and the German Völkisch movement. In the Civil War, the Spanish right, including the military rebels, underwent further political radicalization and fascisation; as Preston writes, "throughout the Civil War, the politics of the army were indistinguishable from contemporary fascisms."

=== Russia ===
In the Russian Empire, pro-Tsarist reactionary groups have been viewed as proto-fascist in nature, especially the Black Hundreds movement and the Union of the Russian People (Russian: Союз русского народа, romanized: Soyuz russkogo naroda; СРН/SRN).

=== United States ===
Proto-fascism in the United States dates back to the 19th century with roots in slavery in the Antebellum South and the Confederacy, the subsequent passage of Black Codes and Jim Crow laws in the American South, the rise of the eugenicist discourse in the U.S., and the intensification of nativist and xenophobic hostility towards immigrants. During the early 20th century, several groups that contemporary historians have classified as fascist organizations were formed in the United States – a prominent group is the Ku Klux Klan.

=== Turkey ===
Some people have drawn parallels between fascist dictatorships and the late Ottoman and early Kemalist governments. Some of these similarities include: suppression or persecution of minorities, intense ethnic nationalism, authoritarian rule, and a state-led economy.

== Historical individuals ==
Prominent historic individuals who have been labeled proto-fascist because they shared an ideological basis with fascism include:

- Joseph de Maistre (1753–1821)
- Thomas Carlyle (1795–1881)
- Paul de Lagarde (1827–1891)
- Hermann Goedsche (1815–1878)
- Goldwin Smith (1823–1910)
- Georges Ernest Boulanger (1837–1891)
- George Fitzhugh (1806–1881)
- Georges Vacher de Lapouge (1854–1936)
- R. A. Schwaller de Lubicz (1887–1961)
- Charles Maurras (1868–1952)
- John Ruskin (1819–1900)
- Ion Dragoumis (1878–1920)
- Vladimir Purishkevich (1870–1920)
- D. H. Lawrence (1885–1930). The English philosopher Bertrand Russell characterized Lawrence as a "proto-German fascist". This characterization is useful as a demarcation point between fascism and proto-fascism. The former has totalitarian uniformity as its paradigm, but Russell is referring to Lawrence as a "nonconformist prophet" struggling with individual alienation, looking to the shared identity of ancestral blood and soil for reconnection i.e. an evolution of the German 19th-century Völkisch movement, an ideology that was adopted by the Nazis.
- Giuseppe Mazzini (1805–1872). The famous Genoese patriot strongly influenced Italian fascism, especially in its early years. In particular, fascism inherited from Mazzini the fervent irredentism, the concept of class collaboration, the pedagogical vocation and the spirit of solidarity. Mussolini himself was a great Mazzini admirer, and many fascist exponents were Mazzinian such as Italo Balbo, Giovanni Gentile, Giuseppe Bottai, and Dino Grandi.
- Francesco Crispi (1818–1901). The known Sicilian statesman was admired by the dictator Mussolini and considered by many scholars as a precursor of Italian fascist regime due to his authoritarian policies, the nationalist character, his strongman reputation, and the aggressive colonial policy implemented during his government.
- Rudolf Steiner (1861–1925)
- Georges Sorel (1847–1922). French revolutionary syndicalist whose theory of political “myths” and celebration of “proletarian” violence influenced anti-parliamentary currents later drawn on by fascist ideologues; after 1909 he and close associates engaged with the royalist Action française milieu and national-syndicalist circles, and he published anti-capitalist antisemitic polemics.
- Édouard Drumont (1844–1917). Prominent French antisemitic and nationalist author who synthesized racial, economic and religious antisemitism, was a leading anti-Dreyfusard voice and founded the Antisemitic League of France in 1899.
- Maurice Barrès (1862–1923). Notable French nationalist author, one of the main anti-Dreyfusards, anti-liberal, anti-individualist popularizer of the term nationalisme which refers to an organic notion of nationalism and proponent of mass emotional politics.

== See also ==
- Authoritarian nationalism
- Clerical fascism
- Crypto-fascism
- Definitions of fascism
- Fascism and ideology
- Para-fascism
- Proto-Nazism
