= Véra Obolensky =

French Resistance member

- Born: Véra Makarova; 11 June 1911; Moscow, Russian Empire
- Died: 4 August 1944 (aged 33); Plötzensee Prison, Berlin, Nazi Germany
- Cause of death: Execution by guillotine
- Known for: Member of the French Resistance

Véra Obolensky (Russian: Вера Аполлоновна Оболенская; 11 June 1911 – 4 August 1944) was a French Resistance member during World War II (1939–45). She served as secretary of the OCM, an important resistance organization, until her arrest in December 1943. She was deported to Germany and executed there after the Liberation of France.

== Life ==
Véra Makarova was born in 1911 in Moscow, Russia. Her father was Apollon Apollonovich Makarov, a member of Russian high society who was vice-governor in Baku, Azerbaijan. The family emigrated to Paris in 1920, during the Russian Civil War. Vera had a Nansen passport (issued by the League of Nations to stateless refugees). After leaving school, Véra Makarova worked as a model for Russian fashion houses, then as secretary to Jacques Arthuys, an industrialist.

Véra married Prince Nicholas Alexandrovich Obolensky (1900–1979) in 1937 in Alexander Nevsky Cathedral, Paris. He was the son of the former governor of Saint Petersburg, and owned property in Nice. In the period just before World War II (1939–1945), the Obolenskys lived well as wealthy members of the exiled Russian aristocracy. They frequented chic restaurants, held dances and took seaside holidays. Nicholas' friends joked that he was the only Russian émigré who could travel by taxi rather than drive a taxi.

== Resistance worker ==
Jacques Arthuys, founder of the OCM resistance organization which he ran from his home on Avenue Victor Hugo, was helped by Vera Obolensky as his secretary. In December 1940, Arthuys combined his group with that of Maxime Blocq-Mascart, which was involved in gathering intelligence and helping prisoners of war escape. Obolensky, called Vicky by friends, took control of the movement's central secretariat. In the spring of 1941, it became the Organisation civile et militaire (OCM). While secretary of the OCM Obolensky also helped Marcel Berthelot gather information for the Centurie network and the Confrérie Notre-Dame (CND) network.

Arthuys was arrested on 21 December 1941. Colonel Alfred Touny took command, and tied the OCM more closely to the military group. Obolensky, who knew all the wheels, renewed the main connections with the help of Yvonne Arthuys. Obolensky continued in charge of the OCM central secretariat under Colonel Touny. She served as the liaison for Blocq-Mascart when he joined the permanent board of the National Council of the Resistance (CNR). She provided liaison between members of the group, collected their reports and maintained secret correspondence. She never had to write down an address, name or password, and became famous for her amazing memory. Obolensky arranged to collect information let slip by German officers who used cocaine and spent their evenings with Spanish dancers. The information was then forwarded to London by Colonel Rémy and his CND network.

According to French physician Arthur Calmette, Obolensky had a lively intelligence, a prodigious memory, and absolute devotion to the cause. Therefore Calmette believes that she was doubly patriotic since she fought for her Russian homeland and for her adopted French homeland. Calmette also describes her extraordinary ability to adapt, remaining cool and hopeful even in the worst circumstances.

== Capture and death ==
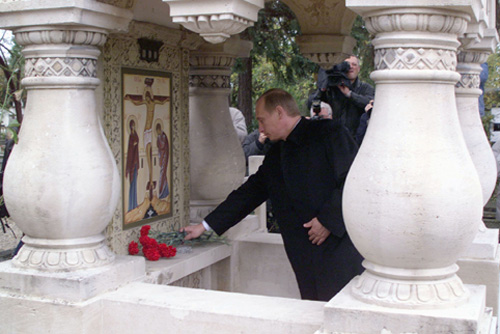
Vladimir Putin visits Vera Obolensky's memorial at Sainte-Geneviève-des-Bois on 1 November 2000

Obolensky was arrested on 16 December 1943 at the home on rue Saint-Florentin of her friend Sofka Nossovitch, another OCM member. She was taken by the team of Rudy de Mérode, which was working for the Gestapo. She was interrogated at great length, and invented many improbable stories to protect her fighting companions. She earned the nickname "Princess I-Know-Nothing-About-It". The German investigator asked her once how Russian anti-communist immigrants could resist Germany and urged her to help Nazi Germany to fight their common enemy in the East. To this, Obolensky stated: “The goal that you pursue in Russia is the destruction of the country and the destruction of the Slavic race. I am Russian, but I grew up in France and spent my whole life here. I will not betray either my homeland or the country that has sheltered me.” Her companion, Sofia Nosovitch, was tortured by immersion in ice water, asked for mercy, was given it, and survived the war in a labour camp.

Obolensky was not tortured. She was tried on charges of treason in a military court in Arras in May 1944 and was found guilty. She was sentenced to death, but refused to sign a petition for mercy. She was finally deported to Germany, first to Berlin's Moabit prison and then to the Barnimstrasse women's prison. Obolensky was guillotined in Plötzensee Prison in Charlottenburg on 4 August 1944. Her body was delivered to the laboratory of Dr. Hermann Stieve, Chief of the Institute of Anatomy at the University of Berlin, who was studying the effect of stress and environmental factors on the reproductive system of women. Her body was never found.

Véra Obolensky's husband was also a member of the Resistance. He became a lieutenant of the FFI and was deported. When Prince Obolensky returned from Buchenwald concentration camp he wrote a book about his wife. He never remarried, and in his old age became a priest at Alexander Nevsky Cathedral in Paris. There is a stele that honours Véra Obolensky in the Sainte-Geneviève-des-Bois Russian Cemetery, and a plaque in her memory in Rueil-la-Gadelière where she lived with her husband. In 1958 Véra Obolensky was posthumously awarded the Knight's Cross of the Legion of Honour and the Croix de Guerre during an official ceremony. She was also awarded the Resistance Medal.

== Sources ==
- A Murderous Paradigm Change: Dr. Hermann Stieve's List, Executions, AHRP: Alliance for Human Research Protection, archived from the original on 2017-07-03
- Bourrée, Fabrice, Plaque en hommage à Jacques Arthuys, fondateur de l'OCM (in French), Fondation de la Résistance (Département AERI), archived from the original on 2020-03-30
- Bourrée, Fabrice; Pennetier, Annie; Strauss, Françoise, "OBOLENSKY Véra née Makarova", Le Maitron Dictionnaire biographique Fusillés et Exécutés 1940–1944, archived from the original on 2017-03-03
- Calmette, A. (July 1959), "La Formation de L'O.C.M. (Organisation Civile Et Militaire) Août 1940-mars 1942", Revue d'histoire de la Deuxième Guerre mondiale (in French), 9e Année (35), Presses Universitaires de France: 1–24, JSTOR 25731929
- Doulkina, Inna (28 June 2012), "Vera Obolensky : la princesse-je-n'en-sais-rien", La Rédaction (in French), archived from the original on 2020-03-30
- Gorboff, Marina (1995), La Russie fantôme: l'émigration russe de 1920 à 1950, L'AGE D'HOMME, ISBN 978-2-8251-0614-3, archived from the original on 2024-04-27
- Pateman, Colin (2017-05-17), Beheaded by Hitler: Cruelty of the Nazis, Judicial Terror and Civilian Executions 1933–1945, Fonthill Media, GGKEY:NYJKRUE9X32, archived from the original on 2024-04-27
- Yagil, Limore (2015-03-04), Au nom de l'art, 1933–1945: Exils, solidarités et engagements, Fayard, ISBN 978-2-213-68330-0, archived from the original on 2024-04-27
