= Jacques Arthuys =

French industrialist (1894–1943)

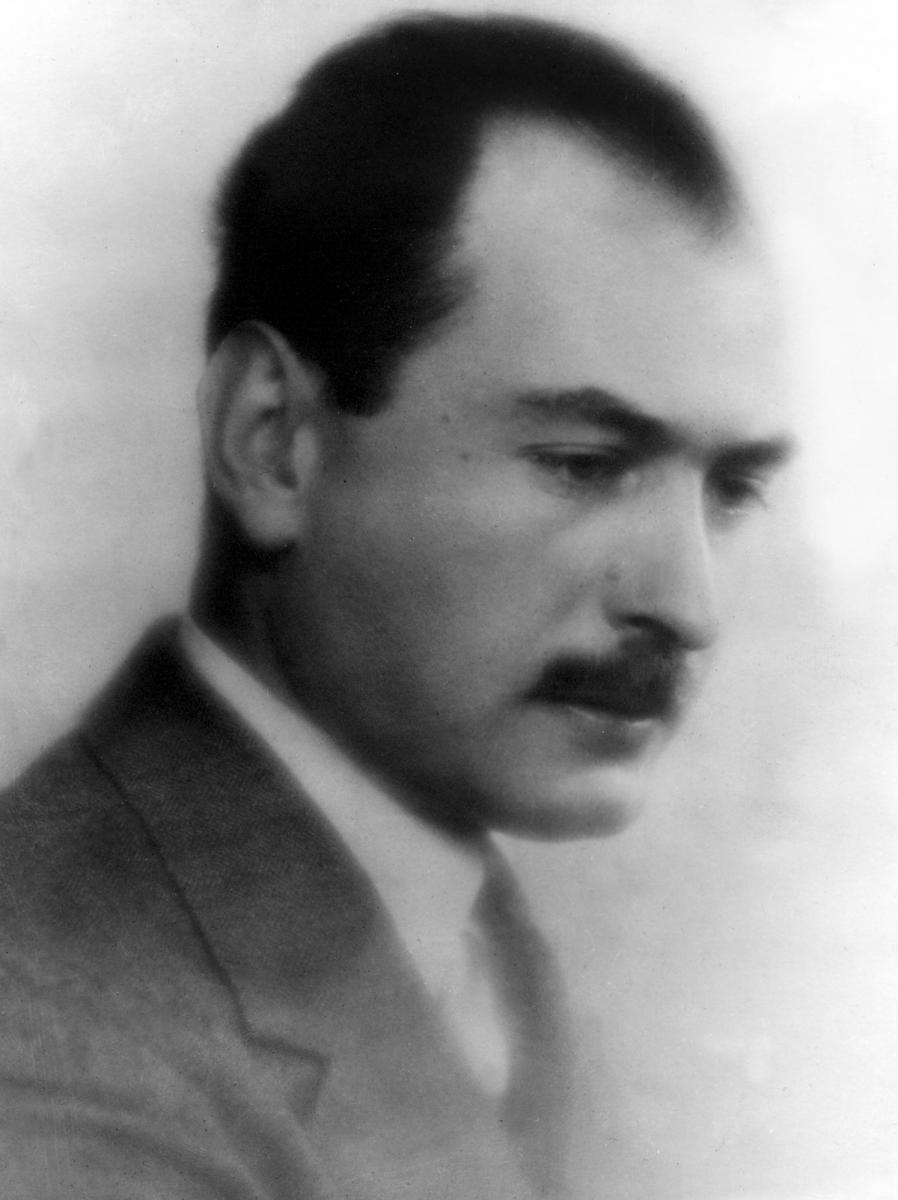
- Born: 15 February 1894; Belfort, Bourgogne-Franche-Comté, France
- Died: 9 September 1943 (aged 49); Hinzert concentration camp, Rhineland-Palatinate, Germany
- Occupation: Industrialist
- Known for: Resistance leader

Jacques Arthuys (15 February 1894 – 9 September 1943) was a French industrialist and right-wing intellectual. He was initially a pan-European but became opposed to the Nazi movement. During World War II (1939–45) he was the leader of the first movement of French Resistance organization, OCM.

== Early years ==
Jacques Arthuys was born on 15 February 1894 in Belfort, son of an officer. He attended Catholic secondary schools, then studied the law, graduating in 1913 with a degree from the University of Nancy. During World War I (1914–18) he joined the army as a volunteer. He was commissioned in 1915 and made a lieutenant in 1916. After being transferred to the air force, he led fighter and bomber squadrons in France and Italy. Arthuys was wounded twice, and was given four citations and the Legion of Honour. Arthuys left the military in 1920 and founded a building materials company in Roubaix-Tourcoing. He and his father-in-law were directors of the Cazeneuve lathe company.

== Inter-war politics ==
=== Right-wing intellectual ===
Arthuys helped the right-wing journalist Georges Valois (Note: Georges Valois was the name assumed by Arthuys' friend Georges Gressent.) direct the activities of the royalist Action Française movement that concerned the economy. In 1921 Arthuys' book Le Problème de la monnaie was published by Valois. Arthuys argued that monetary inflation might be the first cause of inflation, but the negative balance of payments was also a factor. A stable currency was essential, and the franc-or proposed by Valois was the solution. He was not a royalist, but doubted that the republican government could solve the problems France was facing. In late 1921 Arthuys and Valois were members of an organizing committee for a Semaine de la monnaie.

In late 1922 Valois started working towards creating an Estates General of French Production. This movement that would bring together industrialists and leaders of labour unions to work on solutions to social and economic issues. The textile manufacturer Eugène Mathon headed the national committee, which included Valois, Arthuys, Bernard de Vésins and several others. As the post-war economic crisis grew, Arthuys and Valois were alarmed at the excess of state expenditure over revenue, causing a large and growing burden of debt. German reparations could not cover this debt, even if were paid, which they doubted. The only solution was to accept a drop in standards of living and slash spending, sell off state monopolies and fire civil servants. This would be political suicide for the government, but the Estates General should block alternatives like inflation, repudiation or bankruptcy, and should be prepared to take over control from parliament.

Arthuys' published Les combattants in 1925, a book in which he described how the combatants in the war had been transformed by their experience from simple patriots into warriors. He argued that since the war the leftists had exposed the country to many dangers. The veterans, who should have seized power soon after the war, should now reverse this situation. Arthuys contrasted the heroism and endurance of the veterans to the "mediocre and the cowards who make up democratic governments". On 26 February 1925 Valois, Arthuys and others launched Le Nouveau siècle, a newspaper that was supported by some industrialists and that expressed the views of their right-wing group. Arthuys was assisted as editor by the experienced conservative journalists Jacques Roujon and Léopold Marcellin. The official editorial staff was Valois, Arthuys, Philippe Barrès and Hubert Bourgin of the Ligue des Patriotes. The journal tried to reach a broad audience, and as a result was dull. It constantly struggled financially.

=== Faisceau ===
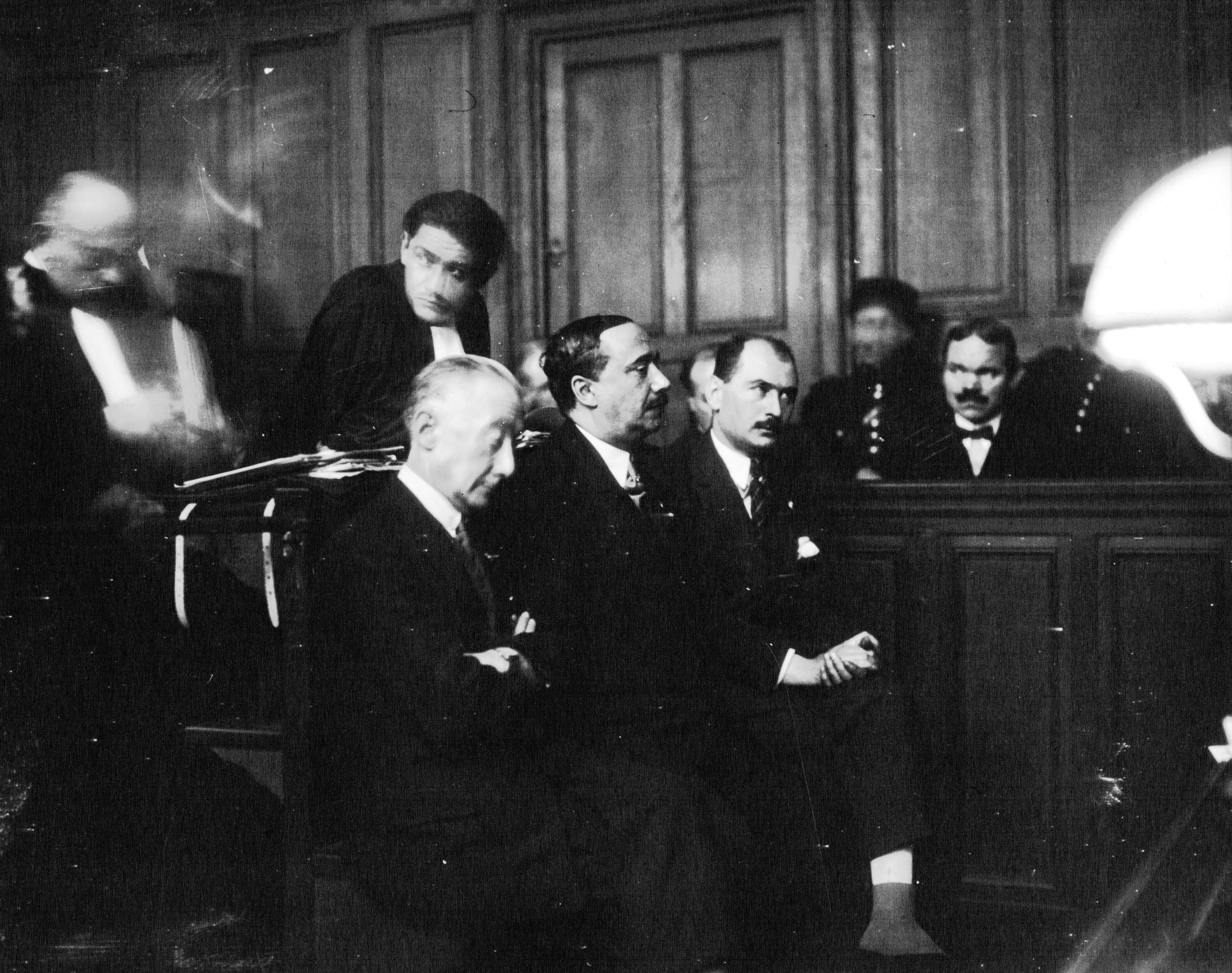
Langlois-Longueville, Valois and Arthuys of the Faisceau on trial in January 1927

In April 1925 Valois founded Les Légions pour la politique de la victoire, a veterans' organization with Arthuys as nominal president. On 11 November 1925 this became the Faisceau (Note: The French word faisceau, sometimes translated as "beam", may also be translated as "an assemblage of long things, bound together", such as the bound bundle of reeds that symbolized public power in ancient Rome. It is the equivalent of the Italian fascio and Latin fasces, a bound bundle of rods that became the symbol of the Fascist movement.) des Combattants et des Producteurs (Collective of Combatants and Producers). The Faisceau was the first French political party that supported Benito Mussolini's ideas. The party was joined by Hubert Lagardelle, founder of Le Mouvement socialiste, and Marcel Bucard, later to be founder of the Mouvement Franciste. They advocated a system based on Italian Fascism and led by the veterans. Valois and Arthuys saw fascism as a pan-European movement, taking different forms in different countries, that would replace the old liberal and bourgeois order with a modern state that would mobilize industry with "a policy of high wages and large profits."

Valois and Arthuys criticized the royalist Action Française for its passive attitude. Violence often broke out between the Faisceau and rival groups on both the left and the right. Just before Christmas 1925 a meeting of the Jeunesses fascistes, the university section of the Faisceau, was violently interrupted by Camelots du Roi, members of "combat groups" of the Action Française. Arthuys met Le Corbusier in March 1927 and soon after proposed that he should be minister of urbanism and housing, but Le Corbusier refused to get involved in politics.

=== Later views ===
Lack of money and the accession of the nationalist government of Raymond Poincaré on 23 July 1926 caused the Faisceau to start disintegrating. By mid-1927 the Faisceau had lost nearly all its members. A year later the remaining fascist loyalists founded the Revolutionary Fascist Party. Valois, however, had started to move back towards the left. On 9 May 1928 the Republican Syndicalist Party (Parti républicain syndicaliste, PRS) was founded, led by Valois, Arthuys, Hubert Bourgin and Charles Albert. The first issue of the party's journal, Cahiers bleus, appeared on 15 August 1928 with contributors such as Pierre Mendès France, Pietro Nenni, Emmanuel Berl, Édouard Berth and future Fascist sympathisers such as Bertrand de Jouvenel, Marcel Déat and Paul Marion.

In the 1930s Arthuys was a member of the right-wing nationalist Croix-de-Feu league created by François de La Rocque. When Adolf Hitler came to power in 1933 Arthuys strongly opposed Nazism. In 1936 Arthuys, the industrialist Pierre Lefaurichon and the architect Roger Souchère launched the Mouvement des classes moyennes (Movement of the middle classes), based in Paris.

== World War II ==
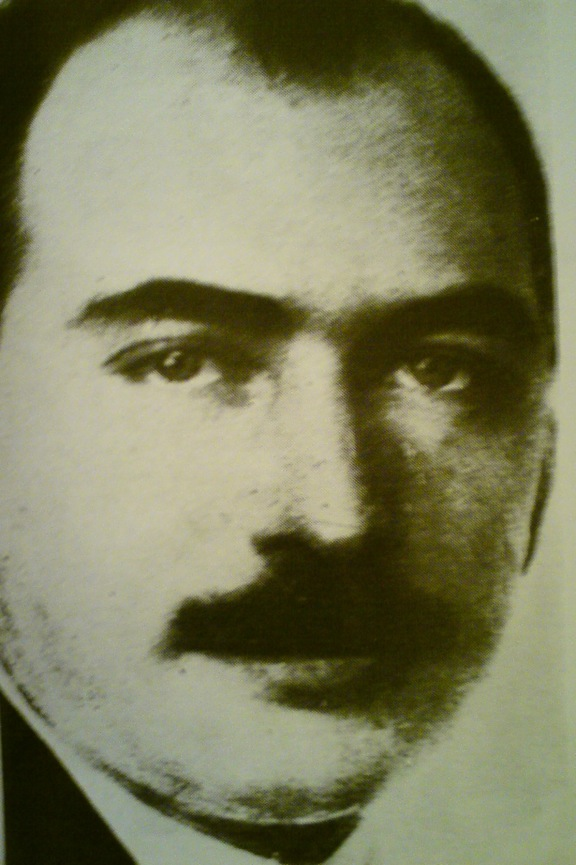
Arthuys in 1939

=== Defeat ===
After the outbreak of World War II in 1939, Arthuys served as a captain in the 60th Divisional Reconnaissance Group. His unit retreated from the Sedan to Orange without loss, and Arthuys wanted to continue fighting in the Army of the Alps. When the armistice was signed he hid his unit's arms in the Orange region and was demobilized. He visited Vichy and spoke with Jean Bichelonne, René Belin and Henry du Moulin de Labarthète. He then returned to Paris where he contacted some officers of the Army's General Staff. The Deuxième Bureau put him in touch with Colonel Alfred Heurtaux.

=== First resistance organization ===
Pierre Lefaurichon, who had been severely disabled in the First World War, organized relief work for prison camps in the Paris region starting in June 1940, helped arrange escapes, and began to recruit resistance fighters. After Arthuys returned to Paris he took command of the new resistance organization which he ran from his home on the Avenue Victor Hugo, helped by his secretary Vera Obolensky. In November 1940 he defined the goals of his group as helping people hunted by the Germans to reach the free zone of France, publishing letters to the French people to raise their awareness, recruiting from the military and setting up an intelligence organization.

=== Organisation civile et militaire ===
Arthuys met Colonel Alfred Touny in Saumur during a veterans' reunion. Touny helped create the Organisation civile et militaire (OCM). The OCM was formed in December 1940 through the merger of the group headed by the Arthuys, the professional officers Colonels Alfred Heurtaux and Alfred Touny, and the group headed by the economic consultant and lobbyist Maxime Blocq-Mascart. The two groups had complementary structures. Blocq-Mascart's group provided leadership, while the Arthuys group could provide the rank and file drawn from the pre-war National Confederation of the Middle Classes.

Arthuys headed the OCM, which had a structure based on the military. The First Bureau was in charge of general organization and directed by Jean Mayer, the Second Bureau was headed by Touny and dedicated to Intelligence, the Third Bureau was in charge of operations, also under Jean Mayer. Blocq-Mascart retained Civil Affairs. The OCM soon began to absorb or make contact with other small groups and networks. The OCM drew its recruits from senior industrialists, civil servants and professionals. The first priorities were the collection of intelligence and the organization of fighting units. The group also published Cahiers that discussed the post-war economy and politics, which gave it the reputation of being elitist and technocratic.

=== Flight, arrest and death ===
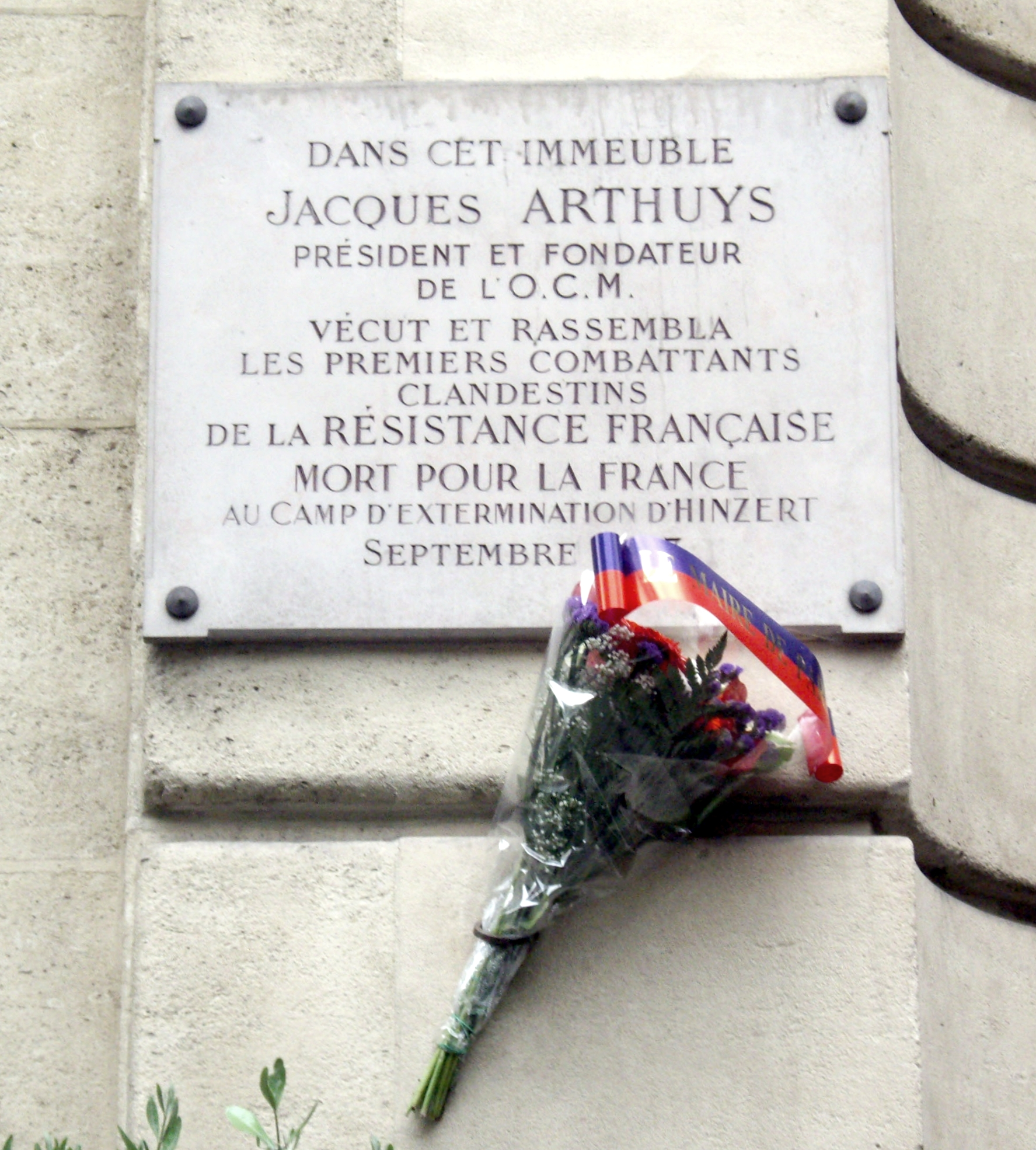
Plaque on Arthuys's home in Avenue Victor-Hugo, Paris

A son of Colonel Heurtaux was arrested in February 1941. Heurtaux intervened at Vichy and at the German military headquarters in Paris to get his son released. Instead, he was also arrested. For some time Arthuys and Lefaurichon went into hiding in the provinces. They returned to Paris, and on 21 December 1941 both men were arrested at Lefaurichon's home. After Arthuys was arrested by the Gestapo, leadership of the OCM was assumed by Colonel Alfred Touny. It continued to provide intelligence to the Free French leaders in exile in Britain.

Arthuys was deported to Hinzert concentration camp, where he died on 9 September 1943. On 13 July 1945 Arthuys was given the retroactive rank of Colonel, effective 1 December 1941.

== Publications ==
Publications include:

- Jacques Arthuys (1921), Le Problème de la monnaie. Son importance. Comment il se pose aujourd'hui. L'avilissement du franc et ses conséquences, Paris: Nouvelle Librairie nationale, p. 192
- Jacques Arthuys (1922), Comment éviter la banqueroute. Où nous en sommes. Les Expédients. La Voie du salut, Poitiers, Paris: Société française d'impr. et de librairie, Nouvelle Librairie nationale, p. 280
- Jacques Arthuys (1925), Les combattants, Paris: Nouvelle librairie nationale, p. 224
- Jacques Arthuys, ed. (December 1925 – April 1928), "editorial", Le Nouveau siècle (weekly journal), Paris
- Jacques Arthuys; Georges Valois (1927), Le Franc-or, Paris: Nouvelle librairie nationale, p. 152

== Sources ==
- Alcalde, Ángel (15 June 2017), War Veterans and Fascism in Interwar Europe, Cambridge University Press, ISBN 978-1-107-19842-5
- Bourrée, Fabrice, Plaque en hommage à Jacques Arthuys, fondateur de l'OCM (in French), Fondation de la Résistance (Département AERI)
- Crowdy, Terry (2007), French Resistance Fighter: France's Secret Army, Oxford: Osprey Publishing, ISBN 978-1-84603-076-5
- Douglas, Allen (8 January 1993), From Fascism to Libertarian Communism: George Valois Against the Third Republic, University of California Press, ISBN 978-0-520-91209-0
- Gerwarth, Robert; Horne, John (3 October 2013), War in Peace: Paramilitary Violence in Europe After the Great War, OUP Oxford, ISBN 978-0-19-968605-6
- Godlove, Terry F. Jr. (23 December 2004), Teaching Durkheim, Oxford University Press, ISBN 978-0-19-803700-2
- Jacques Arthuys (1894-1943), BnF: Bibliothèque nationale de France
- Jackson, Julian (26 April 2001). France: The Dark Years, 1940-1944. Oxford University Press. ISBN 978-0-19-162288-5.
- Langlois, Alfred (21 November 2005). "Alfred Touny". L'Ordre de la Libération. Archived from the original on 12 January 2014.
- Nord, Philip (26 August 2012), France's New Deal: From the Thirties to the Postwar Era, Princeton University Press, ISBN 978-1-4008-3496-9
- Sternhell, Zeev (1995), Neither Right Nor Left: Fascist Ideology in France, Princeton University Press, ISBN 0-691-00629-6
- Tumblety, Joan (4 October 2012), Remaking the Male Body: Masculinity and the Uses of Physical Culture in Interwar and Vichy France, OUP Oxford, ISBN 978-0-19-969557-7
- Weber, Eugen (1962), Action Française: Royalism and Reaction in Twentieth Century France, Stanford University Press, ISBN 978-0-8047-0134-1
- Weber, Nicholas Fox (2008), Le Corbusier: A Life, Alfred A. Knopf, ISBN 978-0-375-41043-7
- Wieviorka, Olivier (26 April 2016), The French Resistance, Harvard University Press, ISBN 978-0-674-97039-7
