= Maurrassisme =

French monarchist body of thought

Charles Maurras in 1925

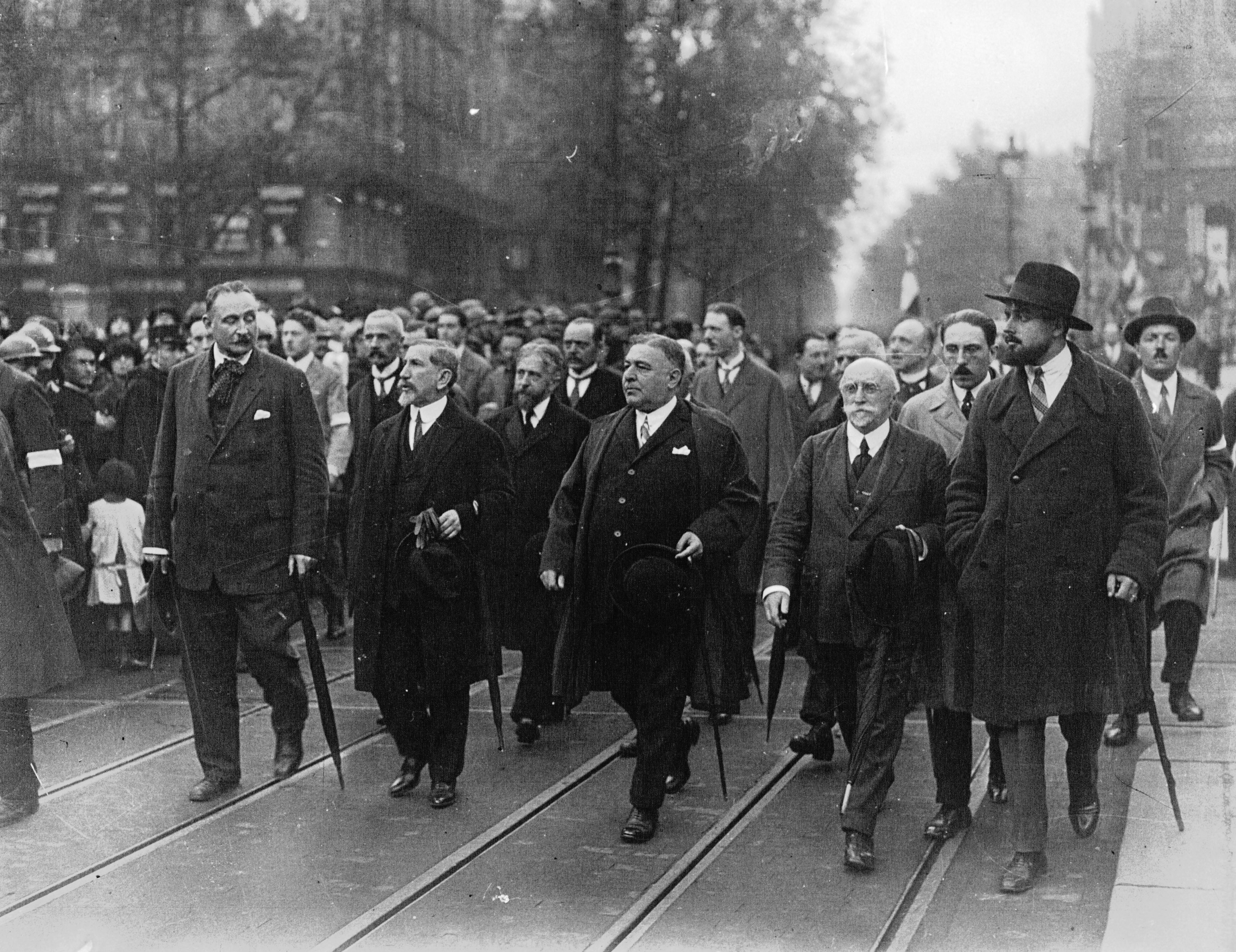
The leaders of Action française parading at the national day of Joan of Arc, 8 May 1927

Maurrassisme is a political doctrine originated by Charles Maurras (1868–1952), most closely associated with the Action française movement. Maurrassisme advocates absolute integral nationalism, monarchism, corporatism, national syndicalism, and opposition to democracy, liberalism, capitalism, and communism.

== The doctrine of Maurrassisme ==
=== A state of decadence ===
Maurrassisme had as its ambition to be a counter-revolutionary doctrine, affirming the cohesion of France and its greatness. It began from a slogan "Politics first", from a postulate, patriotism, which the French Revolution had erased in preference to nationalism, and a state: for Maurras, the French society of the late 19th century was undermined by decadence and corruption. According to him, these ills arose from the Revolution and caused their paroxysm in the Dreyfus affair. Maurras' philosophical influences ranged from Plato and Aristotle to Joseph de Maistre, passing through Dante, Thomas Aquinas and Auguste Comte. His historical influences ranged from Sainte-Beuve to Fustel de Coulanges passing through Hippolyte Taine and Ernest Renan.

At fault, for Maurras, was the revolutionary and romanic spirit, borne by the liberal forces which he called the four confederated states (États confédérés), defined by him in 1949 in Pour un jeune Français: the Jews, the Protestants, the freemasons and foreigners whom Maurras called "metics" (métèques). These represented the "anti-France"; they could not in any way be admitted as part of the French nation.

=== Maurras' solution: order, reason, classicism and liberties ===
Maurrassisme seems to have been born from a desire for order in the young Charles Maurras, attributed by some to his deafness.

- In philosophy, this desire for order incurred an unconditional attachment to reason.
- In art, the defense of classicism against the "deviant" directions of romanticism.
- In politics, he implied aiming for a regime based on authority. But for Maurras, a regionalist Provençal poet, authority had to accord with the respect for regional liberties – a stipulation which, according to him, could only be found in monarchy. Maurras thus became a royalist on principle in 1896.

More precisely with regard to politics, Maurrasisme rested on the following policies to ensure national cohesion:

- The exclusion from the nation of the four "confederated states", and the exaltation of the national interest ("only France"),
- Putting in place institutions charged with simultaneously guaranteeing the regional freedoms of the "real Nation" and maintaining national unity (for Maurras this institution was the Monarchy).
- In morality, the magisterium of the Catholic Church as a unifying cement, and a creator and model of order.

=== A political model based on the "Real Country" (pays réel) ===
In the line of positivism, Maurras considered that societal organisation and institution ought to be the fruit of the selection imposed by the centuries, "organising empiricism" being considered more effective than idealized theories, because of its being adapted to each national situation. Monarchy played a part in these institutions, which were necessary notably to restrain Frankish-French rivalries.

The confidence in institutions forged by time led Maurras to distinguish the "Real Country" (pays réel), rooted in the realities of life — locality, work, trades, the parish and the family — from the "Legal Country" (pays légal) which he cast as artificially imposed on the "Real". These thoughts revisited organicist themes of Catholic political tradition.

Maurras' institutional instinct also owed much to his initial federalism and his affiliation to the Félibrige movement of Mistral. He saw in monarchy the key to the vault of decentralisation. He considered that the people's direct attachment to the sovereign's authority and the moral cement of the Catholic Church were unifying forces which would be enough to ensure national unity in a largely decentralized political system. The republic, by contrast, could only achieve these aims by being constrained by the iron belt of Napoleonic centralized administration. His vision was authority on high, with freedom beneath.

It may be noted that it was through pragmatism and obsession with civil war that, in 1914 as in 1940, Maurras remained faithful to his principle of nationalist compromise, or the union nationale in time of crisis, and supported both Georges Clemenceau and Philippe Pétain in this.

== Place in the history of political ideas ==
=== A new political synthesis ===
In terms of political institutions Maurras had been a legitimist in his youth, then a federalist republican, but rediscovered royalism (although as a supporter of the Orléanists) in 1896 through a political argument: kings had created France, and France had been degenerating since 1789. As a partisan of duc d'Orléans and his descendants (the Duke of Guise, then the Count of Paris), he dreamed of converting the Action française, newly created by nationalist republicans, to the royalist ideal, and of gathering to him the remainder of traditional French royalty, exemplified by the Marquis of la Tour du Pin or General de Charette.

The synthesis between counter-revolutionary ideas and nationalism (but also positivism), triggered by the moral shock of the war of 1870, which had turned some traditionalist forces towards the national idea and largely operated by the Dreyfus affair from 1898 onwards, was to find its apotheosis in Maurrassisme. While there remained some non-Maurrassiste political nationalist movements, such as the many Jacobin expressions of nationalism and the universalist nationalism along the lines of Péguy, counter-revolutionary politics was completely converted to Maurrassisme by 1911 after the consolidation of traditional royalist groups.

Maurrassisisme was to give a second wind to counter-revolutionary ideas, which had been in decline since 1893 which saw Catholics drawn to the Republic. It was to promulgate these ideas beyond their traditionally counter-revolutionary regions, Catholic society and the aristocracy.

Personally an agnostic until the final years of his life (at which time he converted to Catholicism), Maurras appreciated the social and historical role of the Catholic religion in French society, particularly its role as a federating force. His utilitarian vision of the Catholic Church as an institution serving the interest of national cohesion fostered a convergence between devout Catholics and those more distanced from the Church.

=== A major influence on the first half of the 20th century ===
The Maurrassist synthesis would develop into a school of thought in France, and indeed extend beyond French borders. Within France, Maurrassisme became a major influence in intellectual and student circles (in law and medical departments, etc.) in the 1910s and 1920s, reaching a peak in 1926 before the pope's condemnation. By way of example, the Maurrassist current had its attraction to the most diverse personalities, "from Bernanos to Jacques Lacan, from T.S. Eliot to Georges Dumézil, from Jacques Maritain to Jacques Laurent, from Thierry Maulnier to Gustave Thibon, up to de Gaulle".

Maurrassisme was a particular source of inspiration for the Révolution nationale of the Vichy regime of 1940–1941, the regime of Antonio Salazar in Portugal and of Francisco Franco in Spain.

== See also ==
- Camelots du Roi
- Integral Nationalism
- Maurrassisme in Argentina
- Sorelianism

== Bibliography ==
- Pierre Boutang, Maurras, la destinée et l'œuvre, La Différence, 1991.
- François Huguenin, A l'école de l'Action française: un siècle de vie intellectuelle, Editions J.-C. Lattès, 1998.
- Yves Chiron, La vie de Maurras, Perrin, 1991.
- Stéphane Giocanti, Maurras félibre, coll. des Amis de la Langue d'oc, 1995.
- Michel Mourre, Charles Maurras, éd. Universitaires, 1958.
- Jacques Paugam, L'Âge d'or du maurrassisme, preface by Jean-Jacques Chevallier, Paris, Denoël, 1971.
- Claude Hauser & Catherine Pomeyrols (eds), L'Action française et l'étranger: usages, réseaux et représentations de la droite nationaliste française, L'Harmattan, 2001, ISBN 2-7475-1778-0
