= Hubert Bourgin =

French writer and politician

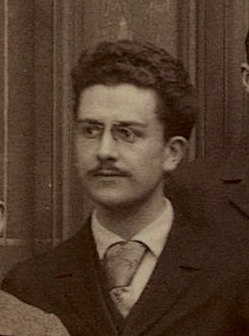
Hubert Bourgin

Hubert Bourgin (3 November 1874 in Nevers – 6 February 1955 in Crosne, Essonne) was a teacher, politician (initially socialist then far-right), and French writer.

== Biography ==
Hubert Bourgin following his studies in high school in Nevers then Janson-de-Sailly (Paris). He won the philosophy honorary award at the Concours General. He entered the École Normale in 1894, it is first to the aggregation of letters in 1898. He is Doctor of Letters in 1905 with a thesis on Fourier. He has a doctorate in law in 1906 with a thesis on the beef industry in the department of Oise of the nineteenth century.

It engages very quickly in politics and among the intellectuals who are mobilizing in favor of Captain Dreyfus (Dreyfus Affair) signing (12th on the list) a petition in The Age and The Dawn on 14 January 1898, in which they "protesting against the violation of legal forms and the 1894 trial against the mysteries surrounding the Esterhazy case."

He teaches second high school in Beauvais 1889–1907, professor at Lycée Voltaire 1907–1911, professor at the Lycée Louis-le-Grand from 1911 to 1937 where he held his choice of a third chair.

From 1905 to 1923, the social curiosity of Hubert Bourgin manifested itself in numerous investigations: the slaughter activity at different ages – relations between employers, workers and the state; public assistance problem in England in Sidney and Beatrice Webb; changes in industrial development and market fluctuations; the steel industry in France at the beginning of the Revolution; study of socialist systems (Doin) of the eighteenth century and Gracchus Babeuf at the Amsterdam Congress in 1904, and from there to the forms of what Hubert Bourgin called the decomposition of socialism: revisionism, reformism, unpatriotic, anarchism, Bolshevism. This incomplete list shows Bourgin Hubert is one of the most representative social historians in what might be called the three wars between (1870–1914–1939).

Hubert Bourgin is clearly a socialist and syndicalist doctrinal position: socialism Lucien Herr and Jean Jaures. He is a member of the Socialist Party.

Mobilized August 6, 1914, he began the war as an instructor at Prytanée La Flèche, second lieutenant of infantry (Department forges); he became Head of Information to the Undersecretariat of State Artillery and ammunition. From 1917 to 1918, he was Bureau Chief of Programmes at the State Undersecretariat of the Merchant Navy, and finally from 1918 to 1919, Civil Supplies Manager at Supply of the Secretariat. He remained during this correction period to contest the Polytechnic and repeater at Conservatoire National des arts et Métiers.

He was a member of the editorial staff of the right-wing newspaper Le Nouveau siècle founded on 26 February 1925, along with Georges Valois, Jacques Arthuys and Philippe Barrès. He joined Valois's Faisceau, the first party with fascist allegiance in France. The new party was violently opposed to the Action Française of Charles Maurras. He then wrote a series of highly controversial books (Fifty years of democratic experience, 1925; The Normal School and politics, 1938; The National School, 1942; The academic socialism, 1942). The general idea of his works is that with proletarian education at all levels, the bourgeois state is playing a dangerous game and is the architect of its own downfall.

During World War II, he evolved into a main right position approximated French Action and ideas, without adhering to it, and defended anti-Germanic and nationalist positions. There is also general secretary of the newspaper Civic Progress, "social development diary". He has written many books on socialism, trade unionism, the Pan-German, German militarism, and biographical books about Fourier and Proudhon.

On a personal level, he adopted Georges and Marcel Viennot Viennot which then took the name of Georges-Viennot Bourgin and Marcel Viennot-Bourgin.

Hubert's brother Georges Bourgin, is archivist and historian of the Commune.

== Bibliography ==
- Proudhon, 1901
- The beef industry in Paris during the Revolution (Ernest Leroux) 1911
- The diplomatic origins of the war: from the correspondence of the British Government in 1914
- Three small animals (Journal of the center), 1920
- The Party against the Fatherland (Plon, Nourruit & Cie), 1921
- Fifty years of democratic experience (New National Library), 1925
- The stones of the house (New National Bookstore), 1926
- She (book dedicated to his missing wife Margaret Darcy), 1927
- When everyone is king, the crisis of democracy (Bossard), 1929
- The flames in ashes (Lemerre) 1929
- Tales of my Garden (Delagrave) 1935
- Tales of the mountains, 1935
- Toutoune (children's book - Delagrave) 1938
- The Normal School and the policy (Gordon) 1938
- Jean Jaurès Blum (Fayard), 1938
- The National School, 1942
- The university socialism (Stock), 1942

== See also ==
- Dreyfus affair
- Faisceau
