= La Nouvelle librairie nationale =

French bookshop and publishing house

The Nouvelle Librairie nationale was a bookshop and publishing house initially associated with the royalist Action française, but which under Georges Valois moved through a succession of National syndicalist and fascist ideologies before closing in 1932.

The Nouvelle Librairie nationale initially specialized in nationalist publications, offering a catalog of nearly 300 titles critical of the Third Republic.

The bookstore hosted works from leading monarchists of Action française, former Boulangists, members of the Ligue de la Patrie Française, and various anti-Dreyfusards.

It became the birthplace of the Cercle Proudhon and published the Cahiers du Cercle Proudhon, a biannual periodical led by Henri Fortin. The publication represented efforts by Georges Valois to attract individuals from socialism and revolutionary syndicalism.

After founding Le Faisceau in 1925, Georges Valois severed ties with Charles Maurras and Action française. The Nouvelle Librairie nationale became Valois's property, renamed Librairie Valois, and briefly served as a publishing house for Le Faisceau authors and fascist theorists (1925–1928). By 1927, Valois distanced himself from fascism, pivoting the bookstore towards social and economic theory until its closure in 1932 during the Great Depression.
