= Roger Souchère =

French architect

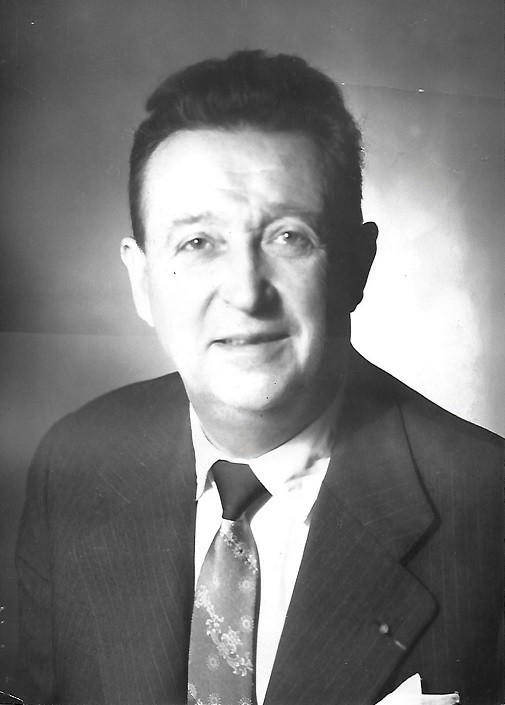
- Born: Roger Georges Scipion Souchère; 21 February 1899; Courbevoie, Hauts-de-Seine, France
- Died: 2 July 1963 (aged 64)
- Occupation: Architect

Roger Souchère (21 February 1899 – 2 July 1963) was a French architect who participated in the French Resistance during World War II (1939–45).

== Life ==
Roger Georges Scipion Souchère was born on 21 February 1899 in Courbevoie, Hauts-de-Seine. He attended the École Centrale Paris and the École nationale supérieure des Beaux-Arts. He became and architect and an engineer of arts and manufactures. In 1936 Jacques Arthuys, the industrialist Pierre Lefaurichon and Roger Souchère launched the Mouvement des classes moyennes (Movement of the middle classes), based in Paris. Souchère was a member of the Freemasons, but resigned from the "Center des Amis" No. 1 in 1937. On 15 April 1940, just before the Fall of France, he asked to be reinstated in the Freemasons.

During World War II (1939–45) Souchère joined the French Resistance, and was one of the co-founders of the Organisation civile et militaire (OCM), a resistance group led by Jacques Arthuys and lieutenant-colonel Alfred Touny. The OCM was formed in the occupied zone at the end of 1940. Arthuys led the movement and was assisted by Souchère as Chief of Staff, Jean Mayer in charge of the first and third Bureaus, Touny for the 2nd Bureau, and Maxime Blocq-Mascart for Civil matters. Souchère became a captain in the 18th region of the French Forces of the Interior. He was arrested, and was deported from Compiègne on 16 April 1943, reaching Mauthausen-Gusen concentration camp in Germany two days later. He was released on 24 April 1945, and repatriated to Annecy on 29 April 1945.

After the war, Souchère was editor-in-chief of the journal Connaissance de l'homme (1954–56). In February 1957 he was a member of the committee of the Amicale de Mauthausen. Roger Souchère died on 2 July 1963.

== Publications ==
- "Compte Rendu de la Reunion du Comite", Amicale de Mauthausen (58), April 1957
- Charles Saunier; Roger Souchère; Armand Boutillier du Retail, Recueil. Documentation sur Gustave Umbdenstock, Paris: Marmite : Larousse universel : Architecture française, 1900-1940
- Paul Castan; Roger Souchère, Le Théâtre à salle tournante, Paris: Société d'impressions industrielles
- Roger Souchère (ed.), "Issue 1: July 1954 – Issue 18: October/December 1956", Connaissance de l'Homme

== Sources ==
- Bourrée, Fabrice, Plaque en hommage à Jacques Arthuys, fondateur de l'OCM (in French), Fondation de la Résistance (Département AERI)
- "Brassard de l'OCM, Paris XE", Musee de la Resistance
- Delon, Francis (20 April 2014), "Grande loge Nationale Française. ARCHIVES & MÉMOIRE", Innovation Democratique (in French)
- "Dossier 186 Ifa 32/1. Lettres de condoléances adressées à Mme Denise Vitale et ses...", ArchiWebture (in French), Ministère de la culture et de la communication
- Perrault, Gilles (22 September 1975), "Le mort à-t-il parle?" (PDF), Notre Epoque
- "Roger Georges Scipion Souchère", Les Français Libres (in French)
- Roger Souchère (1899-1963) (in French), BnF: Bibliotheque nationale de France
