= Organisation civile et militaire =

WW2-era French resistance group

The Organisation civile et militaire (OCM, "Civil and military organization") was one of the great movements of the French Resistance in the zone occupée, the German-occupied region of northern France, during the Second World War.

The OCM was one of the eight great networks of resistance which made up the National Council of the Resistance.

== History ==
The Organisation civile et militaire was founded in December 1940 in Paris through the amalgamation of the Équipe française d'organisation du redressement of the industrialist Jacques Arthuys (the "rue de Logenbach group") and the Confédération des travailleurs intellectuels inspired by Maxime Blocq-Mascart. From January 1941, employees of the public works ministry reinforced the OCM, under the leadership of André Boulloche and the couple Georges et Raymonde Ricroch. The OCM also recruited from the bourgeoisie, industry, businesspeople, former soldiers, and professionals such as architects, lawyers and academics. Two political tendencies were particularly represented: conservatives who were militaristic but Germanophobic and opposed to national revolution, and socialists. The former were the majority initially, but the latter became important as the war progressed.

In late 1941 the OCM only had a few hundred members; two years later, according to Guillaume Piketty, they had 45,000. The OCM's organisation was endowed with military rigour.

The OCM was decapitated in December 1941 with the arrest of Arthuys; Colonel Alfred Touny, formerly in charge of the second bureau of the fourth army became the new leader. Pierre Brossolette put the OCM in contact with colonel Rémy (Gilbert Renault), head of the Confrérie Notre-Dame (CND) network, which was linked to the Bureau Central de Renseignements et d'Action of colonel Passy (André Dewavrin). Touny then organised the Centurie network to coordinate the OCM and the CND. The OCM was also linked with the Hector d'Alfred Heurteaux network and with Libération Nord. Touny's reorganisation, together with the help of the CND and the influx of socialist fighters including Guy Mollet allowed the OCM to take on a new dimension in 1942–1943. Despite some sharp blows dealt by the Gestapo, including the dismantling of the CND in November 1943 and Touny's arrest in February 1944, the OCM stood up, particularly thanks to Jacques Piette].

In total, 4,000 OCM members were killed, shot, assassinated or died following deportation.

== Principal members ==
- Jacques Arthuys
- Roger Souchère, first Chief of Staff
- Maxime Blocq-Mascart
- Roland Farjon, chief of the Northern area
- Moreau Girard, head of the Bretagne and Normandy area
- André Grandclément, head of region B (south-west)
- Georges Izard, who would become secretary-general of the OCM in 1945
- Véra Obolensky
- Marc O'Neill, head of region P (Île-de-France and Orléans)
- Jacques Piette
- Jacques-Henri Simon
- Alfred Touny
- Charles Verny, head of the youth wing OCM jeune

== Bibliography ==
- (in French) Arthur Calmette, L'Organisation civile et militaire. Histoire d'un mouvement de Résistance, de 1940 à 1946, Presses universitaires de France, 1961
- (in French) Daniel Cordier, Jean Moulin, la République des catacombes, éd. Gallimard, 1999
- (in French) Denis Lefebvre, Guy Mollet. Le mal aimé, éd. Plon, 1992
- (in French) Guillaume Piketty, « Organisation civile et militaire », dans François Marcot (dir.), Dictionnaire historique de la Résistance, éd. Robert Laffont, 2006
- (in French) Marc Sadoun, Les Socialistes sous l'Occupation, Presses de la Fondation nationale des sciences politiques, 1982 (ouvrage issu d'une thèse de doctorat d'État dirigée par Maurice Duverger)
- (in French) Daniel Grandclément, L’Énigme Grandclément, Balland, 2003.
