= Integral nationalism =

Type of nationalism that originated in 19th century France

Integral nationalism (French: nationalisme intégral) is a type of nationalism that originated in 19th-century France, was theorized by Charles Maurras and mainly expressed in the ultra-royalist circles of the Action Française. Integral nationalism holds the nation as the highest absolute value to which all individual, class, and humanitarian interests are subordinated, with willpower prioritised over reason. The doctrine is also called Maurrassisme.

== Foundations ==
=== National decline and decadence ===
Integral nationalism sought to be a counter-revolutionary doctrine, providing a national doctrine that could ensure the territorial cohesion and grandeur of the French nation. Its worldview was based on several precepts. Firstly, method: the principle of "Politics first!", that is, that the nationalist, political Catholic and monarchist movements must focus their efforts on changing the political and constitutional order, rather than accepting the victory of radical republicanism and displacing their activity into social or cultural pursuits. Secondly, the belief that the Enlightenment in general and French Revolution in particular had broken a traditional social contract: Maurras held that, by stressing allegiance to the cultural and political nation-state, they had erased an older patriotism based on allegiance to more 'organic' units such as family, petit pays and monarchy. Finally, a moral component: Maurras regarded French society, as of the turn of the twentieth century, as having slid from a Golden Age into a period of decadence and corruption incarnated by the military defeat of 1870–71 and the cultural clash of the Dreyfus affair.

To his mind, the French national community had seen its period of geopolitical grandeur under the absolutist regime of Louis XIV where religion and politics were merged under the absolute authority of the monarch. Maurras blamed French national decline on the overthrow of the cultural and political system of the Ancien Régime, its replacement with the revolutionary and romantic form of liberalism born of the French Revolution (known as Radicalism), and the century of political and constitutional conflict that followed after 1789. Thus Maurras imagined that the introduction of such ideas into the body politic could only have come from outside influences: Freemasons, Protestants, Jews and foreigners (whom he labelled 'Metics'). Together these four communities represented, to Maurras, 'Anti-France' and could never be integrated into the French nation.

=== Order, reason, classicism, authority and liberty ===
In this search for a restoration of the constitutional, political and cultural order of the Ancien Régime, Maurras advocated a political system based on strong authority, a belief in the innate reason of natural law, and a rejection of chaotic romanticism and modernism in favour of orderly classical aesthetic values. His philosophical influences included Plato and Aristotle, Dante and Thomas Aquinas, Auguste Comte and Joseph de Maistre. His historical influences range from Sainte-Beuve to Fustel de Coulanges through Hippolyte Taine and Ernest Renan. But the Jacobin centralism of the French state also aggrieved him: as a Provençal regionalist, he advocated a central state that would yield before traditional local or regional privileges, arguing that only the old monarchy could find this balance.

In its search for the cohesion of an idealised national community, Maurras's political project thus revolved around three major axes:

- Politically: the exaltation of national interest, and with it the exclusion from the national community of the Protestants, Jews, Freemasons and foreigners held to be intrinsically 'un-French' ("France alone");
- Institutionally, a system designed to balance respect for local cultural particularities and political liberties (the pays réel, or 'true country') with the overarching interest of the state (that is, the monarchy);
- Morally, a preponderant role to be granted to the Catholic Church, as a unifying cultural element, a source of social order, and an ideological agent of the central state.

== Characteristics ==
=== Positivist nationalism ===
Integral nationalism seeks to recover natural laws by observing facts and drawing upon historical experiences, even if it cannot contradict the metaphysical justifications which constitutes the true foundation for Christians; for the Action Française, positivism was by no means a doctrine of explanation, merely a method of ascertainment. Maurras's monarchism was a result of his belief that the monarchy was held in conformity with the natural, historical, geographical, and psychological conditions of France: "Natural laws exist," he wrote; "a believer must therefore consider forgetting these laws as impious negligence. He respects them all the more because he calls them the work of eternal Providence and goodness."

=== Counter-revolutionary nationalism ===
Maurras's nationalism is meant to be integral in that the monarchy is, according to him, part of the essence of the French nation and tradition. Royalism is integral nationalism because without a king, all that the nationalists want to keep will weaken first and then perish.

=== Decentralizing nationalism ===
Maurras is an opponent of Napoleonic centralization. He believes that this centralization, which results in statism and bureaucracy—thus joining the ideas of Joseph Proudhon—is inherent in the democratic system. He asserts that republics last only through centralization, with only monarchies strong enough to decentralize. Maurras denounces the insidious use of the word decentralization by the state, which allows it to deconcentrate its power while giving itself a prestige of freedom. What good is it to create universities in the provinces if the state centrally controls them anyway?

=== A social nationalism ===
Despite the measured and cautious support he gave to the Proudhon Circle, a circle of intellectuals launched by young monarchists hostile to liberal capitalism and calling for union with the revolutionary syndicalist movement inspired by Georges Sorel, Charles Maurras defended a social policy closer to that of René de La Tour du Pin; Unlike Sorel and Édouard Berth, Maurras does not systematically condemn the bourgeoisie, in which he sees a potential source of support. In the class struggle, Maurras prefers to propose, as in England, a form of national solidarity of which the king can constitute the keystone.

=== Non-expansionist nationalism ===
Maurras is hostile to the colonial expansion impelled by republican governments that diverts from revenge against Germany and disperses its forces; moreover, it is hostile to the Jacobin and Republican assimilation policy which aims at imposing French culture on peoples with their own culture. Like Lyautey, he thinks that France must be made to love France and not to impose French culture in the name of an abstract universalism.

This last conception attracts him favors in the elites of the colonized peoples; Ferhat Abbas, for example, is an Algerian maurassian: he is the founder of L'Action Algerienne, an organ claiming integral nationalism. This movement fights for the adoption of concrete proposals: all are in the direction of local democracy and organized, the only form of democracy for which Maurras advocated, because in his opinion it is the only truly real one: autonomy of local and regional indigenous corporations, autonomy in social and economic regulation, universal suffrage in municipal elections, wide representation of corporations, communes, notables and native chiefs, constituting an assembly with the French government.

If he was hostile to colonial expansion, Maurras was then hostile to the brutal liquidation of the French colonial empire after World War II, prejudicial to him as much to the interests of France as those of the colonized peoples.

=== Cultural nationalism and rejection of ethnic nationalism ===
Maurras's national theory rejects the messianism and ethnicism that can be found in the German nationalists who inherit Fichte. The nation he describes corresponds to Renan's political and historical meaning in What is a nation?, to the living hierarchies that Taine describes in The Origins of Contemporary France, to the friendships described by Bossuet. In essence, Maurras proposed a form of civic nationalism that was aggressively exclusionist: like the republican civic nationalism of the left, it sought to forge a national community out of the disparate linguistic and regional ethnicities of the French state - Bretons and Alsatians, Basques and Corsicans, Occitans and Flemings, et cetera; it differed from that of the republicans by establishing the criteria for the national community on traditionalist grounds: Catholicism, agrarianism and historic rule under the French monarchy. Thus it took a different direction than the racial or ethno-linguistic nationalism of the German radical right but ended up with a similar degree of vehement xenophobia and antisemitism, as it considered some ethnic, linguistic or religious communities as belonging to the French nation but not others.

== Influence in other countries ==
Maurras and the Action française have influenced different thinkers claiming a counterrevolutionary, anti-Enlightenment and Christian (mainly Catholic) nationalism worldwide.

In Britain, Maurras was followed and admired by writers and philosophers and by several British correspondents, academics and journal editors. In 1917, he was contracted by Huntley Carter of the New Age and The Egoist.

His poems were translated and published in Britain, where Maurras has many readers among the High Church of Anglicanism and conservative circles. Among his reader, there is T.S. Eliot. Eliot found the reasons for his antifascism in Maurras, whose anti-liberalism is traditionalist, to benefit a certain idea of monarchy and hierarchy. Music within me, which takes up in translation the main pieces of La Musique intérieure will be published in 1946, under the leadership of Count G.W.V. Potocki of Montalk, director and founder of The Right Review.

The Ukrainian nationalism of the 19th and early 20th centuries had mainly been liberal or socialist, combining Ukrainian national consciousness with patriotism and humanist values. In contrast, the nationalists who emerged in Galicia following the First World War, much as in the rest of Europe, adopted the form of nationalism known as "Integral nationalism". (Note: From page 523: "The term "integral nationalism" has emerged as the most accurate and least tendentious label for "active nationalism" in the scholarly literature on Dontsov and the OUN") According to this ideology, the nation was held to be of the highest absolute value, more important than social class, regions, the individual, religion, etc. To this end, members of the Organization of Ukrainian Nationalists (OUN) were urged to "force their way into all areas of national life", such as institutions, societies, villages and families. Politics was seen as a Darwinian struggle between nations for survival, rendering conflict unavoidable and justifying any means that would lead to the victory of one's nation over that of others. In this context, willpower was seen as more important than reason, and warfare was glorified as an expression of national vitality.

Integral nationalism became a powerful force in much of Europe during the 1920s and 1930s. The OUN's conceptualization of this idea was particular in several ways. Because Ukraine was stateless and surrounded by more powerful neighbours, the emphasis on force and warfare was to be expressed in acts of terrorism rather than open warfare, and illegality was glorified. Because Ukrainians did not have a state to worship or serve, the emphasis was placed on a "pure" national language and culture rather than a State. There was a strain of fantastic romanticism, in which the unsophisticated Ukrainian rejection of reason was more spontaneous and genuine than the cynical rejection of reason by German or Italian integral nationalists.

The OUN viewed the Ukrainian Greek Catholic Church as a rival and condemned Catholic leaders as police informers or potential informers; the Church rejected integral nationalism as incompatible with Christian ethics. The conflict between the OUN and the Church eased in the late 1930s.

In Portugal, António de Oliveira Salazar ruled the country from 1932 to 1968 and admired Maurras. Even though he was not a monarchist, he condoned Maurras's death in 1952. Integral nationalism has sometimes been considered one of the sources of inspiration for Salazar's regime in Portugal and Francisco Franco's in Spain. Both leaders respected Maurras but did not claim him by setting up a federalist or royalist system. In Spain, Maurras and his integral nationalism were highly influential upon the nationalist and Catholic right during the first half of the twentieth century. That was initially the case for the political current known as 'Maurism' (after the conservative leader Antonio Maura) in the 1910s and early 1920s. Under the Second Spanish Republic, Maurras's integral nationalism was the chief influence upon the ultra monarchists, led by José Calvo Sotelo, who founded the counter-revolutionary journal Acción Española (1931–36) and its party-political emanation, Renovación Española (1933–37). Maurras's ideas were also influential in Franco's National Catholicism.

In the Kingdom of Yugoslavia, Dimitrije Ljotić and his Yugoslav National Movement (Zbor) were heavily influenced by Maurras's ideas. Ljotić was influenced when he was studying in France and attended various meetings.

In Mexico, Jesús Guiza y Acevedo, nicknamed "Little Maurras", and the historian Carlos Pereyra were influenced by Maurras.

In Peru, José de la Riva-Agüero y Osma was influenced by Maurras. The great Peruvian reactionary thinker admired his monarchical doctrine and met him in 1913.

In Argentina, the Argentine military Juan Carlos Onganía, just like Alejandro Agustín Lanusse, had participated in the "Cursillos de la Cristiandad", as well as the Dominicans Antonio Imbert Barrera and Elías Wessin y Wessin, military opponents to the restoration of the 1963 Constitution.

In Guinea, the President of Guinea Ahmed Sékou Touré, embraced Integral nationalism.

== See also ==
- French nationalism
- Integralism
- Monarchism in France
- Royalist
- State nationalism
