= Alfred Touny =

French soldier, lawyer, and businessman

- Born: 24 October 1886; Paris, France
- Died: April 1944 (aged 57); Arras, Pas-de-Calais, German-occupied France
- Cause of death: Execution by firing squad
- Occupations: Soldier, lawyer and businessman
- Known for: Resistance hero

Alfred Touny (24 October 1886 – April 1944) was a French soldier, lawyer and businessman who became one of the leaders of the French Resistance during World War II (1939–45). He was arrested by the Gestapo towards the end of the war and shot.

== Early years ==
Alfred Touny was born on 24 October 1886 in Paris, son of the Director of the Paris municipal police. He studied at the Lycée Henri-IV in Paris, where he was a brilliant pupil, then attended the Ecole Spéciale Militaire de Saint-Cyr (1904–06).

He was made a sub-lieutenant and served in succession with the 11th, 9th and 1st Regiments of Cuirassiers. In 1910 he was promoted to lieutenant and in parallel obtained a bachelor of arts degree and a bachelor of law. In 1913 he was granted leave of absence without pay for three years.

With the outbreak of World War I (1914–18), Touny was recalled to the army in August 1914 and assigned to the General Staff of the Cavalry Corps. On 9 September he was wounded by a bullet at Nanteuil-le-Haudouin. He was appointed captain in 1917, and was awarded the Legion of Honour at the end of the war, with six citations.

He resigned from the army in 1920 and joined the bar of Paris. In 1923 he left the bar and entered industry.

In 1938 Touny was a lieutenant-colonel of the reserve.

== World War II ==
With the start of World War II (1939–45), Touny was recalled in August 1939 to again serve on the 2nd Bureau of the General Staff of the Cavalry Corps in Saint-Quentin. In January 1940 he was assigned to the General Staff of the Fourth Army on the Lorraine front. In July, after the armistice, he was demobilized in Tulle and returned to Paris. His eldest son, Roger Touny, went to England in June 1940 and would later receive the Cross of Liberation.

Alfred Touny refused to accept defeat and in November 1940 began to establish contacts and seek information. He soon met the industrialist Jacques Arthuys and helped him create the Organisation civile et militaire (OCM). The OCM was formed in December 1940 through the merger of the group headed by Arthuys and Colonels Alfred Heurtaux and Touny with the group headed by the economic consultant and lobbyist Maxime Blocq-Mascart. Arthuys led the movement and was assisted by Roger Souchère as Chief of Staff, Jean Mayer in charge of the first and third Bureaus, Touny for the 2nd Bureau, and Blocq-Mascart for Civil matters. Arthuys and Heurtaux were arrested at the end of 1941, and Blocq-Mascart and Touny took over leadership of the OCM. The OCM drew its recruits from senior industrialists, civil servants and professionals. The first priorities were the collection of intelligence and organization of fighting units. The group also published Cahiers, which discussed the post-war economy and politics, which gave it the reputation of being elitist and technocratic. Touny personally recruited many agents covering the north and west of the occupied zone. He organized communications through which the reports of the agents were collected and synthesized centrally.

In 1942 Touny met Gilbert Renault, alias Colonel Rémy, founder of the Confrérie Notre-Dame network, through which OCM information was transmitted to the secret services of Free France, the Bureau Central de Renseignements et d'Action (BCRA). On 20 April 1942 Touny became a member of the Free French Forces, and with the support of the Confrérie Notre-Dame saw his network, which became the Centurie network, expand considerably. Through London and the Bureau des opérations aériennes (BOA) the members of his network were armed through parachute drops.

In 1942 Colonel Rémy was charged with establishing the État-major pour la zone occupée (EMZO). Rémy proposed to name Touny head of EMZO, but General de Gaulle refused. EMZO was to unite all the paramilitary groups in the occupied zone, so it should not be headed by the leader of any one group.

Under the code name "Langlois", Touny sat on the Central Council of the Resistance and then the National Council of the Resistance (CNR) as president of the military commission, where he helped realize the projects of General "Vidal" (Charles Delestraint), first head of the Armée secrète (AS) in the northern zone.

In June 1943 Vidal was arrested in Paris. Touny maintained contacts between the regional leaders of the AS and the regional military delegates sent to London. In the fall of 1943 there were growing numbers of arrests of OCM members, but Touny would not accept advice to move to Algiers or London. He was arrested at his home in Paris on 25 February 1944 and taken to Gestapo headquarters on Avenue Foch. Soon after he was transferred to the prison of Saint-Nicaise in Arras, where he was shot by the Germans at the end of April 1944.

== Honors ==
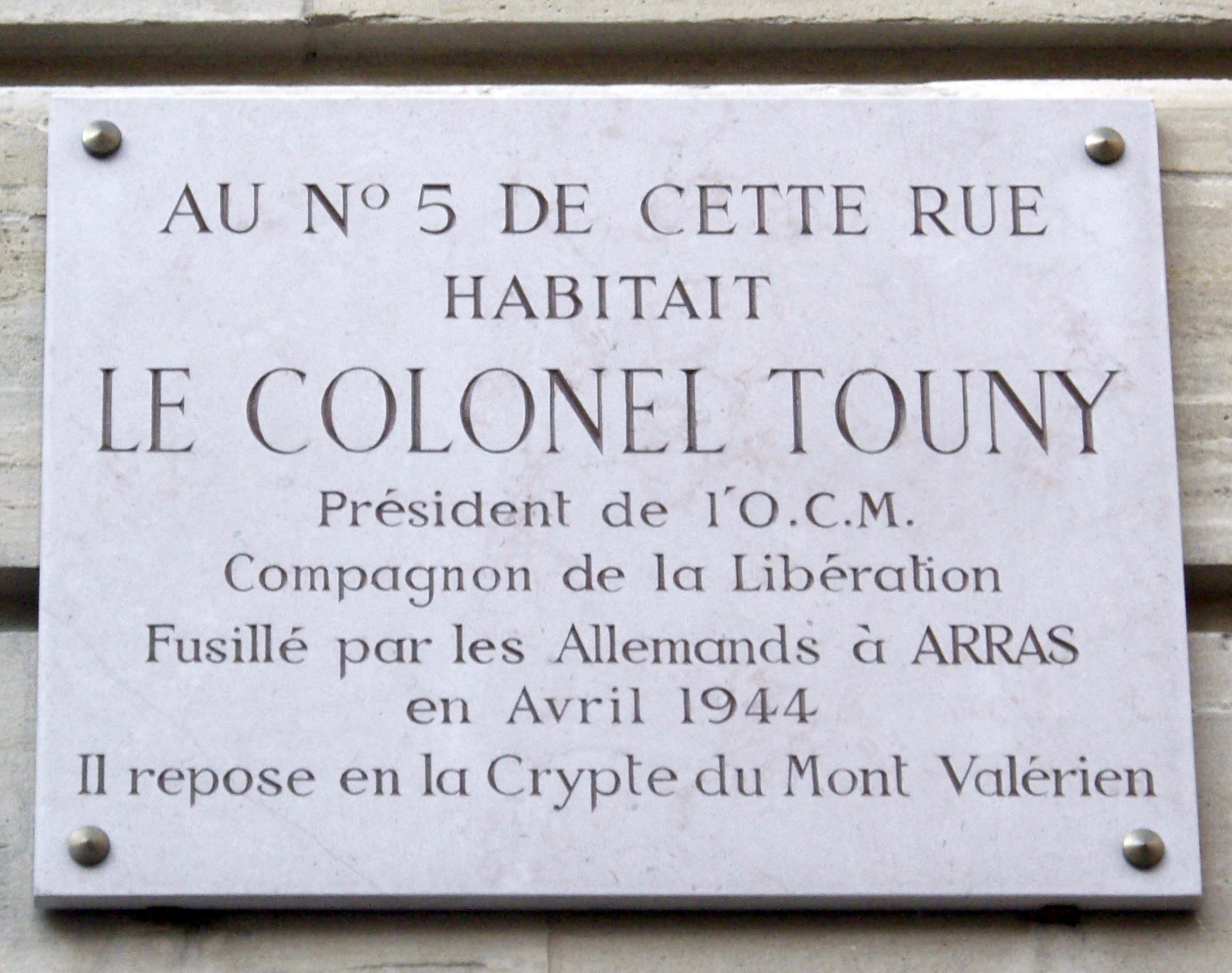
Plaque on Touny's house at 1 rue du Général-Langlois, Paris 16e

Touny's body was found and identified in January 1945, and returned to Paris on 11 November 1945, where he was chosen to represent the men of the Resistance who had been killed by the enemy, among 15 French heroes taken solemnly to the Dôme des Invalides in Paris, then to the Arc de Triomphe, before being buried at Fort Mont-Valérien. His body is now entombed in the crypt of the Mémorial de la France combattante at Mont-Valérien.

Touny was decorated for his service in both World Wars. He received:

- Officier de la Légion d'Honneur
- Croix de Guerre 14/18 (6 citations)
- Croix de guerre 14/18 (Belgium)
- Compagnon de la Libération - decree of 13 November 1945
- Croix de Guerre 39/45 (2 citations)
- Médaille de la Résistance

== Sources ==
- "Brassard de l'OCM, Paris XE", Musee de la Resistance
- Jackson, Julian (2001-04-26). France: The Dark Years, 1940-1944. Oxford University Press. ISBN 978-0-19-162288-5.
- Langlois, Alfred (2005-11-21). "Alfred Touny". L'Ordre de la Libération. Archived from the original on 2014-01-12.
- "Les seize morts pour la France"". La crypte du mémorial de la France combattante. Le Mont-Valérien.
- Passy, Colonel (2000). Mémoires du chef des services secrets de la France libre. Odile Jacob. ISBN 978-2-7381-0870-8.
