= Agostino Lanzillo =

Italian syndicalist and fascist (1886–1952)

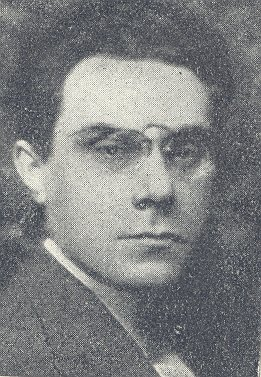

Member of the Italian Parliament for Lombardy
- In office 24 May 1924 – 21 January 1929

Personal details
- Born: 31 October 1886 Reggio Calabria, Italy
- Died: 3 March 1952 (aged 65) Milan
- Party: National Fascist Party
- Education: University of Rome

Agostino Lanzillo (31 October 1886 – 3 March 1952) was an Italian revolutionary syndicalist leader who later became a member of Benito Mussolini's fascist movement.

== Early life ==
Agostino Lanzillo was born in Reggio Calabria on 31 October 1886 to Salvatore and Giuseppina (Cosile) Lanzillo. Agostino attended primary school and secondary school in his hometown. He acquired a law degree from the University of Rome and wrote his thesis on the socialist Pierre-Joseph Proudhon.

== Political career ==
=== Revolutionary syndicalist period ===
Lanzillo was drawn to revolutionary syndicalism and became a follower of Georges Sorel. Lanzillo wrote:

The importance of Sorel in socialist historiography is in my opinion close to that of Marx and Engels

— Agostino Lanzillo, Giorgio Sorel nella storiografia, Il divenire sociale

Lanzillo corresponded personally with Sorel, and published in 1910 the first biography of Sorel. Lanzillo also contributed to the syndicalist journals Avanguardia Socialista and Il divenire sociale.

=== National syndicalist period ===
In 1909, Georges Sorel started collaborating with the French nationalist-monarchist movement Action Française, creating national syndicalism. While many in the Italian Left attacked Sorel and reproached him for his close links with Action Française, Italian revolutionary syndicalists supported Sorel. Lanzillo, for example, defended his master in a series of articles published in Il divenire sociale. Later, Lanzillo wrote to the national syndicalist journal La lupa. From 1912, Lanzillo published under Benito Mussolini editorship, contributing to Avanti!, Utopia and Il Popolo d'Italia.

=== Fascist period ===
Lanzillo was among the founders of the fascist movement, and was a member of National Fascist Party.

Lanzillo was a member of Italian Chamber of Deputies (a house of Italian Parliament), in the 27th parliamentary session (24 May 1924 – 21 January 1929).

Lanzillo was also a member of the one-party National Council of Corporations in 1931.

== Academic career ==
In 1921 Lanzillo was a lecturer in political economy at University of Rome. In 1922 he became a professor of political economy at the Royal University of Milan and in 1923 he became a professor at the University of Cagliari. Later, Lanzillo was appointed rector of Royal Advanced Institute of Economics and Commerce in Venice.

== Writings ==
- La disfatta del socialismo: Critica della guerra e del socialismo. Florence: Libreria della Voce, 1919.
- Le Mouvement ouvrier en Italie. Paris: Revière, n. d. [1910].
