= Maxime Blocq-Mascart =

French banker and lobbyist

- Born: 17 November 1894; Paris, France
- Died: 14 July 1965 (aged 70); Saint-Cloud, France
- Occupations: Banker, economist
- Known for: French Resistance leader

Maxime Blocq-Mascart (17 November 1894 – 14 July 1965) was a French banker, economist and lobbyist who became a leader of the French Resistance during World War II (1939–45). He had antisemitic sympathies. He headed the conservative Organisation civile et militaire (OCM) in the later part of the war. After the war he was involved in various organizations to assist resistance members and families who had been disrupted by deportations. He supported eugenic approaches to revive the falling birthrate. He was a Conseller d'Etat from 1951 to 1962.

== Early years ==
Maxime Blocq-Mascart was born in Paris on 17 November 1894 to an old banking family from Lorraine. He would himself become a banker. He was orphaned when a child, and was adopted by his uncle, a marine officer. During World War I (1914–18) he joined the army on 2 September 1914 and was assigned to the 10th engineering regiment. On 18 March 1915 he was transferred to the 13th artillery regiment as a sergeant. In 1916 he was transferred to the 1st aviation group in Dijon, and in August 1917 graduated as a military pilot from the Avord school and was assigned to the 231 squadron. He was discharged in September 1919.

== Inter-war period ==
Blocq-Mascart returned to Paris and studied at the Ecole libre des sciences politiques. He worked in various banks and industrial companies, worked for the Paris Chamber of Commerce and then was head economist for a Paris-based industrial group. He was both economic consultant and lobbyist. At the start of World War II (1939–45) he was also general secretary of the Europe nouvelle (New Europe) review and vice-president of the Confédération des Travailleurs Intellectuels (CTI, Confederation of Intellectual Workers). Blocq-Mascart was a founder of the Service Social des Travailleurs Intellectuels.

== World War II ==
On 30 October 1939 Blocq-Mascart was assigned to the Mareil-sur-Mauldre chemical works. After the fall of France he was discharged in August 1940. He returned to Paris and formed a resistance unit with his friends from the CTI. In December 1940 this unit merged with the Mouvement des classes moyennes. The latter group was headed by the industrialist Jacques Arthuys and the professional officers Colonels Alfred Heurtaux and Alfred Touny. In the spring of 1941 the movement became the Organisation civile et militaire (OCM). The OCM was a group of anti-Vichy officers and professionals, particularly strong in Paris and the northern industrial regions. Arthuys led the movement and was assisted by Roger Souchère as Chief of Staff, Jean Mayer in charge of the first and third Bureaus, Touny for the 2nd Bureau, and Blocq-Mascart for Civil matters. The OCM drew its recruits from senior industrialists, civil servants and professionals. The first priorities were collection of intelligence and organization of fighting units. The group also published Cahiers that discussed the post-war economy and politics, which gave it the reputation of being elitist and technocratic.

Blocq-Mascart was made head of the OCM civil office and a member of the OCM executive. He supported giving the OCM a political program and assisted with a project for constitutional and administrative reform that recommended a presidential system. Blocq-Mascart and Pierre Lefaucheux (Note: Lefaucheux became the first director of the nationalized Renault works after the war.) developed the OCM doctrine and program, and presumably expressed the view of many businessmen in their constitution project and in their studies in the Cahiers de l'OCM, although these views may not have been shared by all members. In 1941 Blocq-Mascart made contact with Jean Cavaillès of Libération-Nord and with the clandestine Communist Party. Arthuys and Heurtaux were arrested at the end of 1941, and Blocq-Mascart and Touny took over leadership of the OCM. The OCM had several thousand members by 1942.

In 1942 Blocq-Mascart published a 50-page discussion of the "problem of minorities" in the OCM Cahiers. In it he traced the historical roots of antisemitism and its development in prewar in France, taking a position that could be taken as justification for the view. He identified the Jews as a group that caused "ongoing controversies". He concluded that members of national minorities or non-Christian background should be banned from various occupations and places of residence unless they could prove they had been assimilated for several generations. He did not mention recent legislation against the Jews by the Vichy or Nazi regimes. Although some Resistance leaders denounced the article, it reflected the views of most French people at the time.

In April–May 1942 Blocq-Mascart joined the Centurie network that Gilbert Renault ("Colonel Remy") had formed with the OCM. On 26 March 1943 Blocq-Masart attended the first meeting of the Comité de coordination de zone Nord (Coordinating Committee for the Northern Zone). In May 1943 he refused to join the Conseil national de la Résistance (CNR) due to the OCM's opposition to including political parties in the CNR. On 28 August 1943 Blocq-Mascart went underground to avoid the Gestapo. He was vice-president of the OCM until Alfred Touny was arrested in February 1944, then headed the OCM until the Liberation of France. Until the end of 1943 he opposed the CNR structure defined by Jean Moulin. However, he joined the CNR in 1944 in place of Jacques-Henri Simon, and in June 1944 became CNR vice-president. As a member of the CNR executive he represented the OCM, Ceux de la Libération and Ceux de la Résistance, the three main movement in the Zone Nord. He supported the truce during the Paris insurrection.

Blocq-Mascart was a delegate to the Algiers Provisional Consultative Assembly. He proposed that the provisional government issue a provisional constitution at once, with later revisions to be enacted by plebiscite or by an elected body. General Charles de Gaulle rejected this proposal as dangerous and illegal, and took a jaundiced view of the other OCM constitutional proposals, which he associated with an ambitious technocracy that was perhaps anti-democratic. After the Liberation Blocq-Mascart played important roles on the juries of honor and the committees of recognition of the Resistance.

== Later career ==
Blocq-Mascart became vice-president of the Service Social des Travailleurs Intellectuels. He criticized the French Third Republic from a right-wing corporatist viewpoint. He was one of the founders of the OCM organ Parisien Libéré, which he directed until 1947. The journal took a centrist position. He was president of the National Federation of support centers for internees and political prisoners, then of Entr'aide française (French Mutual Assistance). This was a republican version of the Secours National social work organization of Vichy France. He was active in supporting the families of deportees. He was a co-founder of the National Confederation of volunteer fighters of the Resistance.

Blocq-Mascart joined de Gaulle's Haut Comité Consultatif de la Population et de la Famille (HCCPF, Higher Consultative Committee on Population and the Family) in 1945. Blocq-Mascart supported eugenics as a way to address the low birth rate in post-war France, which he blamed on the casual view being taken of town hall marriages. He thought that couples should be trained before being married, and the examiner should be able to require a couple to undertake "additional research" if he thought they were unprepared for marriage. He was opposed to the family vote, but was generally overruled on this by the right-wing majority.

After 1951 Blocq-Mascart represented the interests of France in its African colonies as a Conseller d'Etat during the transition to independence. In 1958 he supported the return to power of de Gaulle. That year he was a member of the Constitutional Advisory Committee. He was a councilor of state until 1962. He did not support de Gaulle's policy on Algeria.

Maxime Blocq-Mascart died in Saint-Cloud in 1965.

== Publications ==
- Maxime Blocq-Mascart (1936), Illusions capitalistes (in French), Paris: les Oeuvres françaises, p. 221
- Maxime Blocq-Mascart (1939), Les Biens de ce monde (in French), Daniel-Rops, preface, Paris: Corrêa, p. 157
- Maxime Blocq-Mascart (1945), Chroniques de la Résistance (in French), Paris: Corrêa (impr. de Curial-Archereau), p. 640
- Maxime Blocq-Mascart (1945), La République en marche (in French), Paris: 'Le Parisien libéré' (impr. de G. Dangon), p. 32
- Maxime Blocq-Mascart, La Crise et les renflouements (in French), Nancy: les éditions du Nouveau journal de l'Est, p. 12
- Maxime Blocq-Mascart (1957), La République française, état fédéral (in French), Paris: la Fédération (Impr. du Palais), p. 48
- Maxime Blocq-Mascart (1958), La prochaine République sera-t-elle républicaine ? (in French), Michel Debré, preface, Paris: Plon, p. 90

== Sources ==
- Adler, K. H. (2003-08-07), Jews and Gender in Liberation France, Cambridge University Press, ISBN 978-1-139-43550-5
- Bourrée, Fabrice (2004), "Maxime Blocq-Mascart", La Résistance en Ile-de-France (in French), AERI
- "Brassard de l'OCM, Paris XE", Musee de la Resistance
- Ehrmann, Henry Walter (2015-12-08), Organized Business in France, Princeton University Press, ISBN 978-1-4008-7832-1
- Hayes, Peter (2015-04-01), How Was It Possible?: A Holocaust Reader, U of Nebraska Press, ISBN 978-0-8032-7491-4
- Jackson, Julian (2001-04-26). France: The Dark Years, 1940-1944. Oxford University Press. ISBN 978-0-19-162288-5.
