= Cercle Proudhon =

Proudhon Circle Cercle Proudhon
- Leader: Georges Valois
- Founder: Georges Valois; Édouard Berth
- Founded: December 16, 1911
- Dissolved: 1925
- Succeeded by: Faisceau
- Headquarters: Paris, France
- Newspaper: Cahiers du cercle Proudhon
- Ideology: National syndicalism Integral nationalism Proto-fascism; Sorelianism
- Political position: Far-right

Cercle Proudhon (French pronunciation: [sɛʁkl(ə) pʁudɔ̃]; French for Proudhon Circle) was a national syndicalist political group in France. The group was inspired by Georges Sorel, Charles Maurras and a selective reading of anarchist theorist Pierre-Joseph Proudhon.

== History ==
Founded on December 16, 1911, by national syndicalist disciples of Georges Sorel, Georges Valois and Édouard Berth, the group was described as "founded by nationalists, and initially addressed only to them". The organisation began as informal meetings consisting of about twenty people on average, mainly monarchists and syndicalists who were associated with the right-wing monarchist group Action Française. The main speakers at these meetings were Valois, Berth, monarchist militant Henri Lagrange and nationalist philosopher Gilbert Mayor. French historian Géraud Poumarède describes the Circle's ambition as to "convert trade unionists to the monarchy".

Despite the group's close association to Sorel, he was initially hostile to the group. Stating that he feared the Circle would make "young people less able to understand Proudhon". Charles Maurras was also wary of the group describing them in his book, L’Action française et la religion catholique (1913): "The French who met to found the Circle Proudhon are all nationalists. The boss they chose for their assembly made them meet other French, who are not nationalists, who are not royalists, and who join them to participate in the life of the Circle and the writing of Cahiers. The initial group includes men of different origins, different conditions, who have no political aspirations in common, and who will freely expose their views in the Cahiers."

The Circle published a bulletin entitled Cahiers du Cercle Proudhon, and operated a bookstore owned by Valois named the La Nouvelle Librairie. A successor briefly operated in the twenty first century.

== Ideology ==
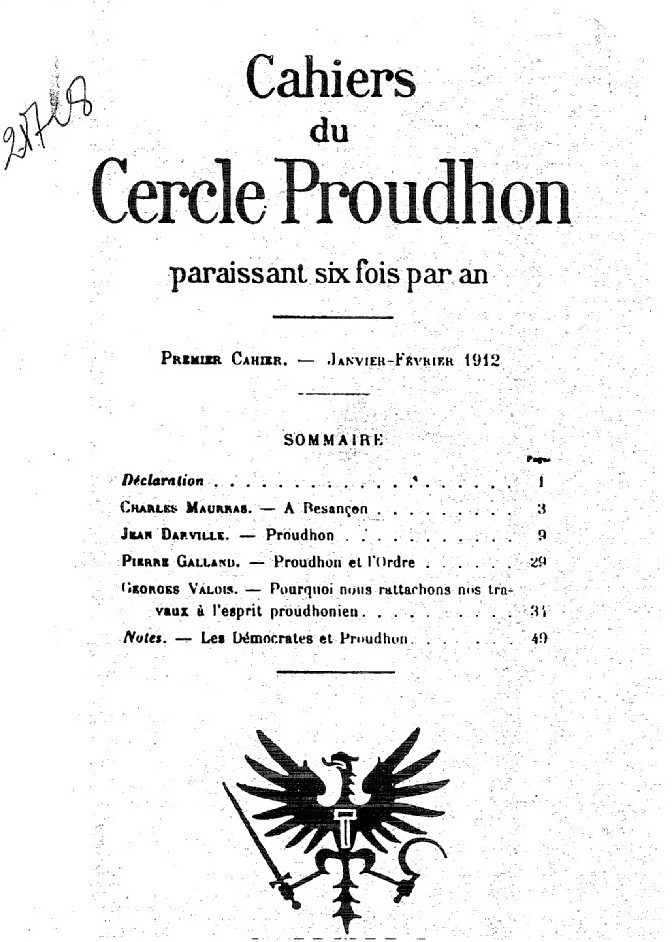
Cover of the first issue of Cahiers du Cercle Proudhon. The logo is not the logo of the circle but this of the publisher of this anastatic new edition

The first issue of Cahiers du cercle Proudhon appeared in January – February 1912 and included a Déclaration:

The founders – republicans, federalists, integral nationalists, and syndicalists – having resolved the political problem or dismissed it from their minds, are all enthusiastically in favour of an organisation of French society in accordance with principles taken from the French tradition which they find in Proudhon's works and in the contemporary syndicalist movement, and they are all completely in agreement on the following points:

Democracy is the greatest error of the past century. If one wishes to live, if one wishes to work, if one wishes in social life to possess the greatest human guarantees for production and culture, if one wishes to preserve and increase the moral, intellectual and material capital of civilisation, it is absolutely necessary to destroy all democratic institutions.

Berth and Valois had been brought together by Georges Sorel when he was planning a Nationalist and socialist-leaning journal La Cité française in 1910. This journal never appeared, except as heralded in a flyer entitled Déclaration de la Cité francaise signed by Sorel, Valois, Berth, Jean Variot, and Pierre Gilbert. However Variot quarrelled with Valois and went on to publish material with Sorel's support in L'Indépendance.

A controversial but influential book by Zeev Sternhell, Neither Right nor Left: Fascist Ideology in France, points to the Cercle Proudhon as a pre-existing laboratory for fascist ideas that would provide a bulwark for Nazi collaboration in Vichy.

In place of the bourgeois ideology and as an alternative to democratic socialism, the Cercle Proudhon propounded a new ethic suited to the alliance of nationalism and syndicalism, those "two synthesizing and convergent movements, one at the extreme right and the other at the extreme left, that have begun the siege and assault on democracy." Their solution was thus intended as a complete replacement of the liberal order. They wished to create a new world — virile, heroic, pessimistic, and puritanical — based on the sense of duty and sacrifice: a world where a morality of warriors and monks would prevail. They wanted a society dominated by a powerful avant-garde, a proletarian elite, an aristocracy of producers, joined in alliance against the decadent bourgeoisie with an intellectual youth avid for action. When the time came, it would not be difficult for a synthesis of this kind to take on the name of fascism.

== Critique ==
Many anarchists rejected the Cercle Proudhon interpretation of Proudhon's works. In the October 1st, 1913 issue of The New Freewoman, American Individualist Anarchist Benjamin Tucker argued that Cercle Proudhon purposely misrepresented Proudhon's views:

Democracy is an easy mark for this new party, and it finds its chief delight in pounding the philosopher of democracy, Rousseau. Now, nobody ever pounded Rousseau as effectively as Proudhon did, and in that fact the Cercle Proudhon finds its excuse. But it is not to be inferred that, because Proudhon destroyed Rousseau's theory of the social contract, he did not believe in the advisability of a social contract, or would uphold a monarchy in exacting an oath of allegiance.

== See also ==
- National syndicalism
