= National syndicalism =

Far-right adaptation of syndicalism

National syndicalism is a nationalist adaptation of syndicalism within the broader agenda of integral nationalism that developed during the French Third Republic and spread to other romance regions such as Italy and the Iberian Peninsula. National syndicalism advocates for militant trade unionism to combat the corrupting influence of party politics.

This approach to syndicalism is based on the work of Georges Sorel and further iteration by Charles Maurras and Action Française, leading up to the founding of the Cercle Proudhon, a nationalist and syndicalist party, in France in 1911. Under Benito Mussolini and Francisco Franco, both nationalist projects explicitly used the model developed in France for their fascist movements.

== Background ==
=== Georges Sorel ===
Georges Sorel is sometimes described as the father of revolutionary syndicalism. He supported militant trade unionism to combat the corrupting influences of parliamentary parties and politics, even if the legislators were distinctly socialist. As a French Marxist who supported Lenin, Bolshevism and Mussolini concurrently in the early 1920s, Sorel promoted the cause of the proletariat in class struggle, and the "catastrophic polarization" that would arise through social myth-making of general strikes. The intention of syndicalism was to organize strikes to abolish capitalism; not to supplant it with State socialism, but rather to build a society of worker-class producers. This Sorel regarded as "truly true" Marxism.

Georges Sorel developed his thought based on Henri Bergson's irrationalist philosophy and his conception of "social myths". According to him, parties, parliamentary democracy and state are all abstractions that rest on centralism. He argued that these abstractions are "enslaving" humanity, while only direct action and individualism are close to "immediacy of life". He considered every direct action to be based on "mythical image", which serves as a motive force that pushes the group's energy forward and gives it the "strength for martyrdom" for the action. The myth is "identical with the convictions of a group, being the expression of these convictions in the language of movement". Sorel argued that, upon engaging in the direct action for the liberatory purposes, the agent of the action has no experience of this liberation before action, therefore it is an epistemological obscurity since it is an "event from the future". For this purpose, the direct action can be only driven by "myth", "a memory from the future". Therefore, the myth is a "representation of the unrepresentable" and allows intelligibility with the future liberation, and thus direct action must be based on myth. The action itself brings the "framing of the future, in some indeterminate time". Sorel saw decentralized trade unions and their means of struggle, general strikes, as expressing direct action. For Sorel, the "myth of general strike" served as a "true impulse of an intensive life". Sorel thought that only proletariat possessed the militant energy needed for direct, revolutionary action to revitalize the degenerate and sick soul of Europe. The self-realization of proletariat with liberatory action is accompanied by the conflict, and therefore, violence, because it juxtapositions old order with the new – social refoundation involves destruction of old and the creation of new. The general strike expresses direct action for Sorel because it possesses this structural, epoch-making character – it gives its agents focus and direction for radical transformation, it totally destroys the structural and institutional status quo. The form of general strike is actually non-violent, but the transformation it brings entails the "phenomenal violence" of "life against life". According to Sorel, the general strike would be very general and extending to the whole country, thereby paralyzing the system by making any repression impossible. The general strike would lead to "a release of the individualistic forces within the rebelling mass".

But later on, along with class struggle, Sorel elaborated on nationalism or "national myth" as another "myth" inspiring direct action. He saw the myth of "great nation to be created" and the "national enemy" as an inspiring mythical image, as well as the syndicalist myth of struggle against the bourgeois order and the class enemy.

From 1900 onward, Charles Maurras had presented that "a pure socialist system would be devoid of any element of democratism", one that questioned neither private property nor a liberal economy, but only liberal democracy and its philosophical foundations. In 1909, the integral nationalists Action Française began to work with Sorel. The connection was formed after Sorel read the second edition of Maurras' book, Enquête sur la monarchie. Maurras favorably mentioned Sorel and revolutionary syndicalism in the book, and even sent a copy of the new edition to Sorel. Sorel read the book, and in April 1909 wrote a praising letter to Maurras. Three months later, on 10 July, Sorel published in Il Divenire sociale (the leading journal of Italian revolutionary syndicalism) an essay admiring Maurras and Action Française. Sorel based his support on his anti-democratic thought. For example, he claimed that Action Française was the only force capable to fight against democracy. Action Française reprinted the essay in its newspaper on 22 August, titled "Anti-parliamentary Socialists".

=== Cercle Proudhon ===
During the preparations for launching La Cité française, Sorel encouraged Berth and Valois to work together. In March 1911, Henri Lagrange (a member of Action Française) suggested to Valois that they found an economic and social study group for nationalists. Valois persuaded Lagrange to open the group to non-nationalists who were anti-democratic and syndicalists. Valois wrote later that the aim of the group was to provide "a common platform for nationalists and leftist anti-democrats".

The new political group, called Cercle Proudhon, was founded on 16 December 1911. It included Berth, Valois, Lagrange, the syndicalist Albert Vincent and the royalists Gilbert Maire, René de Marans, André Pascalon, and Marius Riquier.

== Italy ==
In the early 20th century, nationalists and syndicalists were increasingly influencing each other in Italy. From 1902 to 1910, a number of Italian revolutionary syndicalists including Arturo Labriola, Agostino Lanzillo, Angelo Oliviero Olivetti, Alceste De Ambris, Filippo Corridoni and Sergio Panunzio sought to unify the Italian nationalist cause with the syndicalist cause and had entered into contact with Italian nationalist figures such as Enrico Corradini. These Italian national syndicalists held a common set of principles: the rejection of bourgeois values, democracy, liberalism, Marxism, internationalism, and pacifism while promoting heroism, vitalism, and violence. Not all Italian revolutionary syndicalists joined the Fascist cause, but most syndicalist leaders eventually embraced nationalism and "were among the founders of the Fascist movement," where "many even held key posts" in Mussolini's regime. Benito Mussolini declared in 1909 that he had converted over to revolutionary syndicalism by 1904 during a general strike.

Enrico Corradini promoted a form of national syndicalism that utilized Maurassian nationalism alongside the syndicalism of Georges Sorel. Corradini spoke of the need for a national syndicalist movement that would be able to solve Italy's problems, led by elitist aristocrats and anti-democrats who shared a revolutionary syndicalist commitment to direct action through a willingness to fight. Corradini spoke of Italy as being a "proletarian nation" that needed to pursue imperialism in order to challenge the "plutocratic" nations of France and the United Kingdom. Corradini's views were part of a wider set of perceptions within the right-wing Italian Nationalist Association (ANI) that claimed that Italy's economic backwardness was caused by corruption within its political class, liberalism, and division caused by "ignoble socialism". The ANI held ties and influence amongst conservatives, Catholics, and the business community.

A number of Italian fascist leaders began to relabel national syndicalism as Fascist syndicalism. Mussolini was one of the first to disseminate this term, explaining that "Fascist syndicalism is national and productivistic… in a national society in which labor becomes a joy, an object of pride and a title to nobility." By the time Edmondo Rossoni became secretary-general of the General Confederation of Fascist Syndical Corporations in December 1922, other Italian national syndicalists were adopting the "Fascist syndicalism" phrase in their aim at "building and reorganizing political structures… through a synthesis of State and labor". An early leader in Italian trade unionism, Rossoni and other fascist syndicalists not only took the position of radical nationalism, but favored "class struggle". Seen at the time as "radical or leftist elements," Rossoni and his syndicalist cadre had "served to some extent to protect the immediate economic interests of the workers and to preserve their class consciousness". Rossoni was dismissed from his post in 1928, which could have been due to his powerful leadership position in the Fascist unions, and his hostilities to the business community, occasionally referring to industrialists as "vampires" and "profiteers".

With the outbreak of World War I, Sergio Panunzio noted the national solidarity within France and Germany that suddenly arose in response to the war and claimed that should Italy enter the war, the Italian nation would become united and would emerge from the war as a new nation in a "Fascio nazionale" (national union) that would be led by an aristocracy of warrior-producers that would unite Italians of all classes, factions, and regions into a disciplined socialism.

In November 1918, Mussolini defined national syndicalism as a doctrine that would unite economic classes into a program of national development and growth.

== See also ==
- Corporatism
- Fascism
- National Trade Union Confederation of Finland
- National Anarchism
- Economics of Fascism
- Faisceau
- Syndicalism
- Proto-fascism
- Spanish Trade Union Organisation
- Falangism
- Strasserism
- National Bolshevism
- State capitalism
- Third Position
- Juntas de Ofensiva Nacional-Sindicalista
- National Syndicalists (Portugal)

== Sources ==
- Vahabzadeh, Peyman (2019). Violence and Nonviolence: Conceptual Excursions Into Phantom Opposites (PDF). University of Toronto Press. ISBN 9781487523183.
