= Georges Valois =

French journalist and politician (1878–1945)

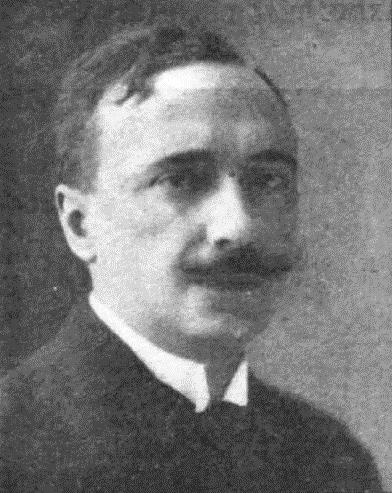
- Valois in 1925
- Born: Alfred-Georges Gressent; 7 October 1878; Paris, France
- Died: February 1945 (aged 66); Bergen-Belsen concentration camp, Nazi Germany
- Cause of death: Typhus
- Occupations: Journalist, politician
- Political party: Faisceau (1925–1928); Republican Syndicalist Party (from 1928)

Georges Valois (French: [ʒɔʁʒ valwa]; born Alfred-Georges Gressent; 7 October 1878 – February 1945) was a French journalist and national syndicalist politician. He was a member of the French Resistance and died in the Bergen-Belsen concentration camp.

== Life and career ==
Born in a working-class and peasant family in Paris, Georges Valois went to Singapore at the age of 17, returning to Paris in 1898. In his early years, he was an anarcho-syndicalist. He found work as a secretary at L'Humanité Nouvelle where he met Georges Sorel. Later, after a stay in Imperial Russia (1903), he worked as secretary at Armand Colin publishing house.

After having written his first book, L'Homme Qui Vient (The Coming Man), he met the nationalist and monarchist writer Charles Maurras and became a member of his Action Française, where he continued to follow the workers' movement. As his employment would have been compromised by an involvement in the far-right monarchist league, he took the pseudonym of Georges Valois.

In 1911, he created the Cercle Proudhon, a national syndicalist group, and took direction of the publishing house of the Action française, the Nouvelle librairie nationale, in 1912. The Cercle mixed Sorel's influence with the integralism favoured by Charles Maurras and was overtly anti-Semitic. According to the historian Zeev Sternhell, that ideology was the prefiguration of Italian fascism.

In 1925, Valois founded the weekly Le Nouveau Siècle (The New Century), which was seen by Maurras as a potential rival. As a result, he lost his job at La Nouvelle librairie nationale. The rupture with Maurras became even more serious after his creation the same year of the Faisceau league.

His long-term collaborator Jacques Arthuys was one of the leaders of the new league. It was assisted by major entrepreneurs in their fight against the agitation of the French Communist Party (PCF). After some initial success (it was joined by such extremist figures as Hubert Lagardelle and Marcel Bucard), it disappeared in 1928, when Valois had already been excluded from the party. The middle class may have withdrawn its support because of its lack of confidence in fascism as a plausible solution for France or because it considered, following a trend established by the Roman Catholic Church (which in 1926 excommunicated the Action française), that the best solution was to infiltrate the Third Republic's institutions.

Valois lost financial support, the Faisceau was dissolved, he founded the Republican Syndicalist Party (PRS). Jacques Arthuys was also a leader of the party. During the second Cartel des gauches (Left-wing Coalition), the party published the Cahiers bleus (1928–1932), which hosted essays by widely-different personalities, including Marcel Déat (a future neo-socialist who had been excluded from the French Section of the Workers' International (SFIO) who would later be a collaborationist), Bertrand de Jouvenel (co-founder of the Mont Pelerin Society, a liberal organisation that still exists), Pierre Mendès France (one of the young guards, or jeunes loups, of the Radical-Socialist Party who would become French Prime Minister during the Fourth Republic), and Édouard Berth.

After the 6 February 1934 crisis, Valois founded Le Nouvel Âge ("The New Era"), which he presented as a left-wing review, along with the Cahiers bleus. However, Le Nouvel Âge promoted a post-capitalist economy using a corporatist economy. In 1935, he attempted to join the SFIO, but was turned down although he was backed by Marceau Pivert.

Valois took part in the French Resistance during Vichy France. During World War II, he moved near Lyon, where he launched a cultural co-operative project.

Valois was finally arrested by the Nazis on 18 May 1944, and died in February 1945 of typhus at the Bergen-Belsen concentration camp.

== Works ==
- La Monarchie et la classe ouvrière, 1914
- L'Économie Nouvelle, 1919
- La révolution nationale, 1924
- L'État syndical et la représentation corporative, les semaines économiques et la campagne pour les états généraux 1920-1924, 1927
- Basile ou la politique de la calomnie, 1927
- L'Homme contre l'argent, 1928
- Un Nouvel âge de l'humanité, 1929
- Finances italiennes, 1930
- Économique, 1931
- Guerre ou révolution, 1931
- Journée d'Europe, 1932
- 1917-1941 : fin du bolchevisme, conséquences européennes de l'événement, 1941
- L'Homme devant l'éternel (published posthumously), 1947

== See also ==
- Faisceau league
- 6 February 1934 crisis
