= Édouard Berth =

French theorist (1875–1939)

- Born: Camille Berth; July 1, 1875; Jeumont
- Died: January 25, 1939 (aged 63); Neuilly-sur-Seine
- Other name: Jean Darville
- Citizenship: French
- Occupations: Philosopher, translator, socialist activist, essayist, trade unionist, sociologist
- Political party: Cercle Proudhon; French Communist Party (1920–1935)

Édouard Berth (1 July 1875 – 25 January 1939) was a theorist of French syndicalism and disciple of Georges Sorel. In 1911, he co-founded the Cercle Proudhon with Georges Valois.

Berth tried to unify the materialism of Marx and the metaphysics of Bergson through his articulation of revolutionary self-organization of the proletariat.

== Life and career ==
From 1899, Édouard Berth became a regular contributor to Le Mouvement socialiste before breaking with this review in 1909. An active defender of Alexandre Millerand's reformist positions until 1902, he then gradually evolved towards revolutionary syndicalism, while showing a mystical inclination.

From 1909, Berth, starting from a common aversion for “bourgeois” parliamentary democracy, moved closer to the monarchist movement and founded with Georges Valois and wrote for Cahiers du Cercle Proudhon in 1911. He then tried to propose a synthesis of revolutionary syndicalism and corporatism.

In 1917 was enthusiastic about the Bolshevik Revolution and saw in it a new expression of the class struggle. A contributor to the review Clarté, he joined the French Communist Party in 1920. Disillusioned with communism, he became a vehement critic of Stalin's policies in the Soviet Union and the Stalinist PCF, and later once again joined the ranks of revolutionary syndicalism from 1935.

Becoming increasingly marginalized by the labor movement in France, Berth died mostly forgotten of angina pectoris in Neuilly-sur-Seine.
