= Le Faisceau =

The Fasces Le Faisceau
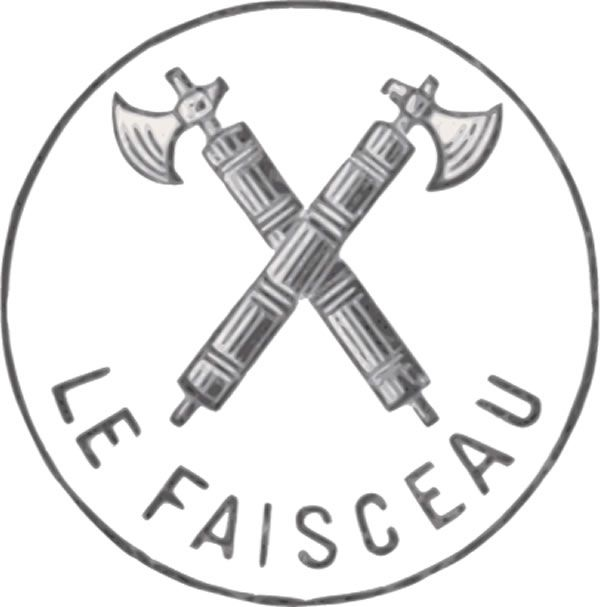
- Leader: Georges Valois
- Founder: Georges Valois
- Founded: 11 November 1925
- Dissolved: 1928
- Preceded by: Cercle Proudhon
- Succeeded by: Republican Syndicalist Party
- Newspaper: Le Nouveau Siècle
- Paramilitary Wing: Légions
- Ideology: Fascism (French)
- Political position: Far-right

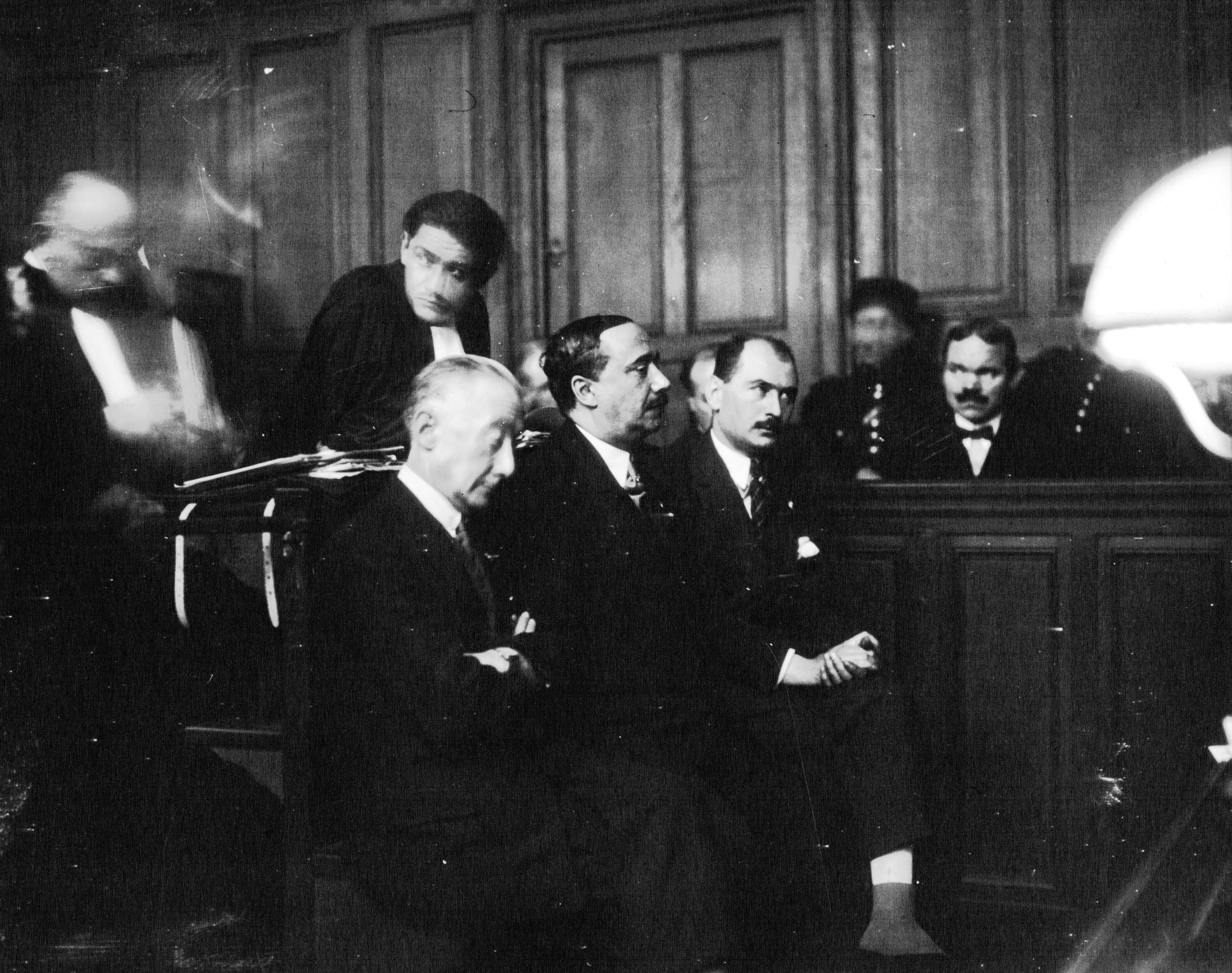
Leaders of the Faisceau; Maurice Langlois-Longueville, Georges Valois and Jacques Arthuys, before the XI Criminal Chamber (1927).

Le Faisceau (French pronunciation: [lə fɛso], "The Fasces") was a short-lived French fascist political party. It was founded on 11 November 1925 as a far right league by Georges Valois. It was preceded by its newspaper, Le Nouveau Siècle, which had been founded as a weekly on February 26 but became a daily after the party's creation.

== Creation ==
Contributors to Le Nouveau Siècle originally included Valois, Jacques Arthuys, Philippe Barrès, Hubert Bourgin, Eugène Mathon, Henri Massis and Xavier Vallat. After the foundation of the party it was the object of bitter attacks from the Action Française, who considered it a potential rival, and most well-known names were intimidated. Arthuys, Barrès and Mathon were among those who remained.

The Faisceau had borrowed its name from the Italian Fasci and the National Fascist Party (PNF), and also adopted their paramilitary style - with uniforms, staged ceremonies and parades; it also expressed admiration for Benito Mussolini. Even extensive investigations by the French police failed to reveal any links, official or unofficial with the PNF and Italy. Many of its ideas were ones already established in the French far right milieu, deriving mostly from the work of Maurice Barrès. Valois claimed that Barrès' Le Cocarde had been the first Fascist newspaper.

== Authoritarianism and corporatism ==
They included a "national" state (i.e. for the benefit of all social classes, rather than the existing "bourgeois" state or the Marxist proletarian state) with a strong, authoritarian leader. Thus, its stated aims included a coup d'état and a dictatorship, although it never took any concrete steps towards achieving these ends. Nor was it clear who the dictator was to be — Valois himself did not indicate a willingness to occupy the position, and Maxime Weygand may have been the preferred candidate of some members of the Faisceau.

The Faisceau ran into serious problems almost as soon as it was founded. Valois — a former anarcho-syndicalist who had converted to Orléanism and joined the Action Française (leaving the group after the World War I) — and the industrialists who financed the party, such as Eugène Mathon (the owner of a large textile firm) and the perfume manufacturer François Coty all claimed to favour corporatism as the basis for economic organisation. Nonetheless, it soon became clear that they had rather different ideas about what the term meant. For Valois, it arguably meant a form of producerism, with an economy to be run by the producers (everyone involved in manufacturing goods), whereas Mathon interpreted it as an amended laissez-faire capitalism, where businessmen like himself should be in charge, with no interference by the state.

These differences led to Mathon and Coty leaving shortly after the foundation of the party, placing it in a precarious financial situation, made worse by the commercial failure of Le Nouveau Siècle following the Action Française's attacks.

== Valois's version of fascism ==
Valois considered fascism to be a revolt against "bourgeois rule", and as such it had much in common with Marxism — he described them as "brother enemies". The Faisceau never questioned the existence of private property, but Valois nonetheless felt that socialism was not his main enemy; he stated that fascism had "exactly the same object as socialism", even if he viewed the latter as flawed in its means of achieving that end.

The party tried to place itself above the left-right division, but this particular outlook turned out to be a source of further problems. Most of its militants came from the right, particularly the far-right (this serves to explain the Action Française's hostility: many Action Française militants joined Faisceau, being disillusioned with the lack of dynamism maintained by Charles Maurras, the group's acute Roman Catholic and Orléanist conservatism, and its primary functioning as a literary society). It worked hard to recruit people from the left, with some success: notably, Marcel Delagrange, former French Communist Party (PCF) mayor of Périgueux, and the anarcho-syndicalist (and future Vichy Régime minister) Hubert Lagardelle. One notable member was Marcel Bucard, who would later found the Mouvement Franciste and collaborate extensively with the Nazi authorities during the German occupation of France.

These minor victories were never proportionate to the effort invested by the Faisceau, and the group failed to expand at the left's expense, while becoming the enemy of the right - unlike in Italy, the latter was strong and confident enough not to rely on Fascists against the left.

The Faisceau's aims were indeed radical, but its actions did not live up to them. The party did form paramilitary "Légions" — but they usually functioned as self-defence against attacks by the Action Française's Camelots du Roi. They rarely clashed with police forces, and their only major engagement with the PCF was at the party's meeting in Rheims on 27 June 1926. Those who had joined hoping for revolutionary action began to leave, and, by the end of 1926, the party was losing militants fast - a decline was hastened by the formation of a right-wing government under Raymond Poincaré, and the stabilisation of the franc.

The Faisceau ceased to exist in 1928. Valois himself, whose politics were becoming more left-wing, was excluded from the party, the remains of which founded the Parti Fasciste Révolutionnaire.

== Bibliography ==
- Arnold, Edward, editor (2000). The Development of the Radical Right in France: From Boulanger to le Pen. London: Macmillan.
- Carsten, Francis (1980). The Rise of Fascism. Berkeley: University of California Press.
- Halls, W. D. (1995). Politics, Society, and Christianity in Vichy France. Oxford: Berg.
- Morgan, Philip (2002). Fascism in Europe, 1919-1945. London: Routledge.
- Payne, Stanley (1996). A History of Fascism, 1914-1945. London: Routledge.
