= L'Action française et le Vatican =

1927 book by Charles Maurras

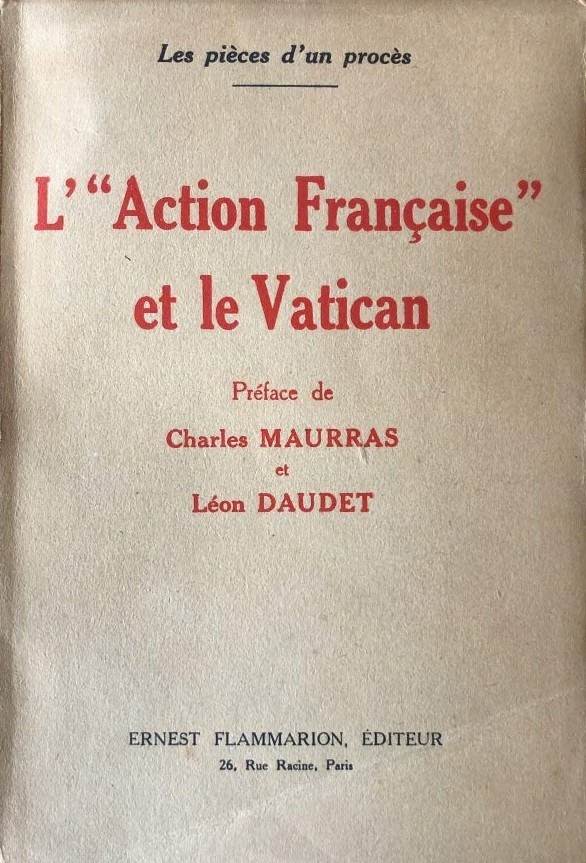
- Editor: Ernest Flammarion
- Author: Charles Maurras
- Publication date: 1927
- Publication place: France

L'Action française et le Vatican is a book by the French journalist and politician Charles Maurras, director of L'Action française, published in 1927. The text is a collection of letters, articles and statements relating to the condemnation of Action Française by Pope Pius XI.

== Context ==
On August 25, 1926, Cardinal Andrieu, hostile to the theses of Charles Maurras, launched a warning approved by the papacy against the French Action demanding its submission. On December 20, 1926, the Pope ordered the Catholics to break with Action Française and published the decree of the Congregation of Index of January 29, 1914 which condemns seven works by Maurras : Le Chemin de Paradis, Anthinéa, Les Amants de Venise, Trois Idées politiques, L'Avenir de l'intelligence, La Politique religieuse and Si le coup de force est possible. Through the decree of the Roman inquisition dated December 29, 1926 Pope Pius XI confirms the condemnation of his predecessor Benedict XV and extends it to the daily L'Action française. Catholics who remained loyal to Action Française were not excommunicated "but treated with the greatest severity as public sinners, deprived of the sacraments and religious funerals".

== Presentation ==
Considered the "yellow book" of Action Française, this work is introduced by a preface by Charles Maurras and Léon Daudet. According to historian Olivier Dard, it is a "major printed source for understanding the crisis" with the papacy but it is also a "weapon of combat and conquest of public opinion".

== Around the book ==
In parallel with this publication, Charles Maurras republished Le Chemin de Paradis redacted and commented on to respond to Catholic objections.

Antonio Gramsci cites Action française and the Vatican for its study of the condemnation of Action française in its Prison Noteboks.

== Bibliography ==
- Suarez, Georges (1 October 1927). "L'Action française et le Vatican". Mercure de France: 237-243.
- Guy-Grand, Georges (February 1928). "Les Livres jaunes du conflit de l'Action française". La Grande revue: 669-677.
- Guy-Grand, Georges (April 1927). "L'Action française, le Vatican et la République". La Grande revue: 187-205.
- Guy-Grand, Georges (May 1927). "L'Action française, le Vatican et la République". La Grande revue: 374-388.
- Poulat, Émile (2010). "Le Saint-Siège et l'Action française, retour sur une condamnation". Revue française d'histoire des idées politiques (31): 141-159.
- Dansette, Adrien (1951). "L'Eglise et l'Action française: I: Jusqu'à la condamnation". Esprit (182): 275–299. ISSN 0014-0759. JSTOR 24252374.
- Magali Della Sudda (11 November 2021). "Condamner et soumettre : Sanctions spirituelles à l'épreuve des résistances à la condamnation de l'Action française (France 1926-1939)". Colloque International FULMEN 2. École Française de Rome.
- Jacques Prévotat, « Les milieux catholiques d’Action française », dans L'Action française : culture, société, politique, Presses universitaires du Septentrion, coll. « Histoire et civilisations », 10 mai 2019 (ISBN 978-2-7574-2123-9, lire en ligne), p. 157–172
- Prévotat, Jacques (1996). "La condamnation de l'Action française par Pie XI". Publications de l'École Française de Rome. 223 (1): 359–395.
- Prévost, Philippe (2008). Autopsie d'une crise politico-religieuse: la condamnation de l'Action française, 1926-1939 (in French). Librairie canadienne. ISBN 978-2-912023-01-8.
- Thomas, Lucien (1965). L'Action française l'Église : de Pie X à Pie XII (in French). Nouvelles Editions Latines.
