= L'Allemagne et nous =

1945 book by Charles Maurras

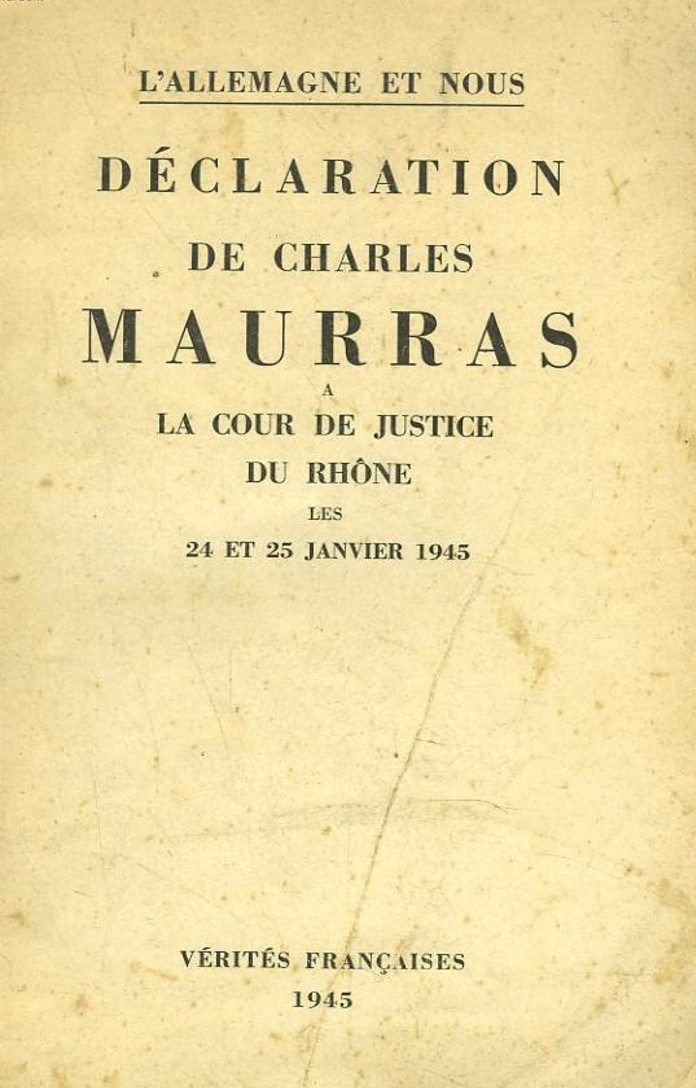
- Editor: Vérités françaises
- Author: Charles Maurras
- Publication date: 1945
- Publication place: France

L'Allemagne et nous (Germany and us) is a book by French journalist and politician Charles Maurras, director of L'Action française, published in 1945. The text takes up the defense of the Cour de Justice du Rhône held between January 24 and 27, 1945 after the Liberation of France. The statement retrospectively explores the position of Action Française vis-à-vis Germany during the first half of the 20th century.

== Presentation ==
=== Context ===
On September 8, 1944, Maurras was arrested in Lyon during a press conference, at the instigation of the resistant and commissioner of the republic Yves Farge, close to the Communist Party. After two months of incarceration, Maurras learns of the date of his trial set for January 24, 1945 and receives the reason for his indictment: « intelligence with the enemy ». During his incarceration, Charles Maurras refuses interrogations because of his deafness and receives permission to explain himself in writing. Germany and therefore takes back from us the one hundred and twenty-five pages of defense "which the accused forced the jurors of the court to read for seven hours". He finishes his reading on the morning of Thursday, January 25. In his defense, Charles Maurras highlights his visceral and constant anti-Germanism throughout his life since the Franco-Prussian War of 1870. On January 27, 1945, the Lyon Court of Justice declares Charles Maurras guilty of high treason and intelligence with the enemy and condemns him to life imprisonment and national degradation. Maurras commented on his conviction with a famous exclamation: "It's Dreyfus's revenge !".

=== Structure ===
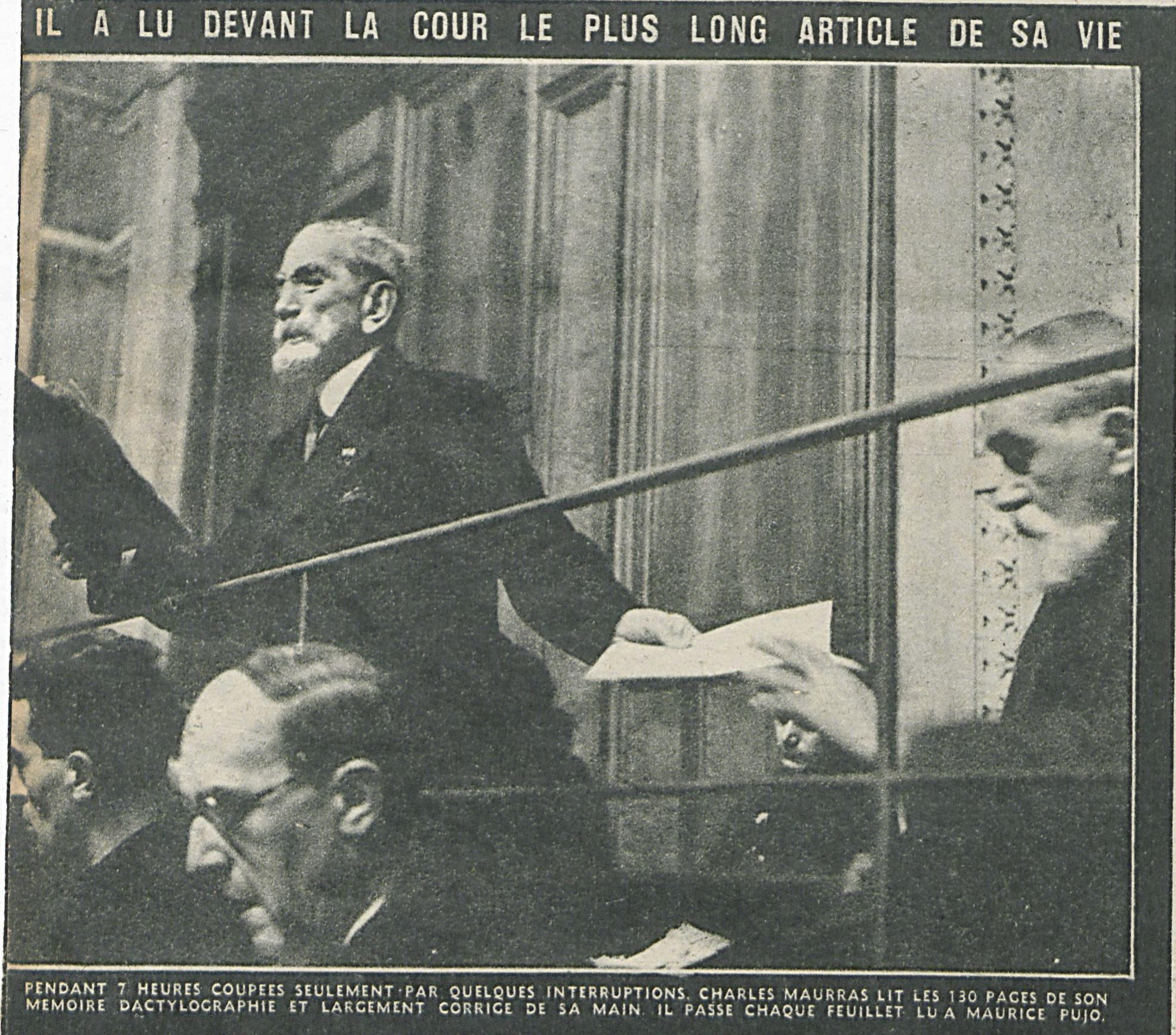
Charles Maurras reads his argument in Lyon during his trial opened on January 24 in Lyon. He hands his leaves to Maurice Pujo.

The text is a veritable historical fresco divided into six parts, on the relationship maintained by Action Française with Germany during the first half of the 20th century. Charles Maurras quotes extensively from old publications or articles from L'Action française. The first part entitled "Intellectual Germany and French Action" evokes the intellectual foundations and the historical analysis of French Action on Germany until 1904. The second part "L'Action française et l'autre war" discusses Maurras's warning in his book Kiel et Tanger in 1905, the sacred union of 1914 till armistice of 11 November 1918. The third part "Twenty years of alarm from Warsaw to Munich" addresses the positions of Action Française during the interwar period. The fourth part "Position in the aftermath of our disasters" explains the position of "France alone" defended by Maurras after the defeat of June 1940. The fifth part "The Laval party - the German party. The armistice to deliver everything" denounces the collaboration and particularly Pierre Laval. The sixth part "The "perfect agreement with the Marshal"" allows Maurras to attack more vigorously the strategies of influence of Marcel Déat and Pierre Laval within the Vichy regime.

=== Analysis ===
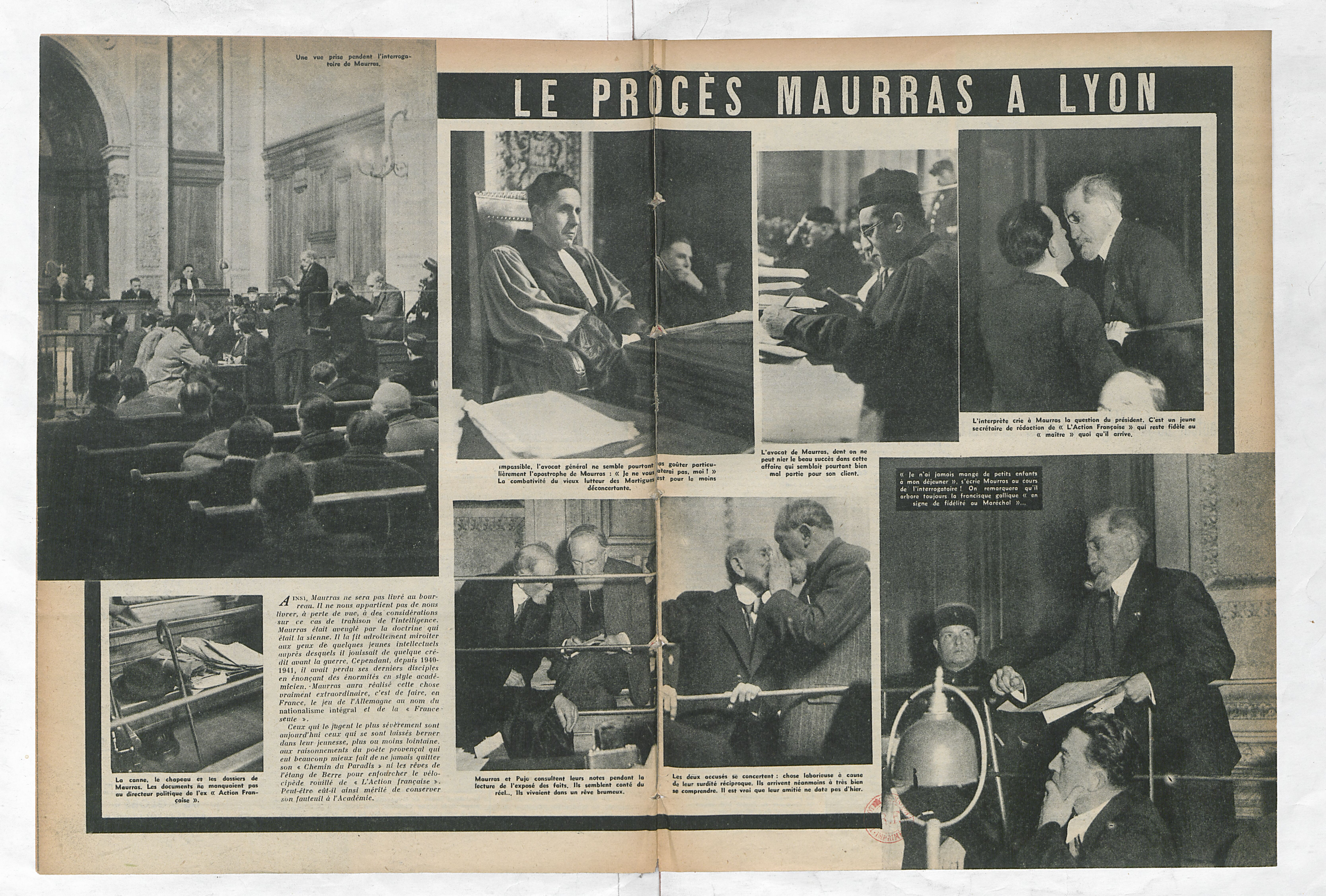
The trial of Charles Maurras and Maurice Pujo in Globe of February 8, 1945.

Maurras strives to "demonstrate the consistency of his attitude throughout his life and during the war". Sociologist Gisèle Sapiro shows that Maurras in no way denies his state anti-Semitism throughout his defense. He downplays his verbal abuse of Jews on the grounds that they "were only responses in self-defense to attacks and slander".

According to American historian Eugen Weber, the trial, which lasted only three days, was a political trial: the jurors were chosen from a list drawn up by political enemies of Maurras, there were numerous defects in form and special effects, the motive chosen is the most infamous and the most contradictory with the meaning of his life. For its supporters, the regime condemns the one who has constantly made it face up to its responsibilities and makes it pay the price for its own mistakes.

For the legal historian Catherine Fillon, the initial charge of intelligence with the enemy was not appropriate because it would have been better to "put Vichy on trial and show how the unwavering loyalty Maurras had shown to the place of politics and especially of the person of Marshal Pétain had ended up serving the German goals".

Historian Stéphane Giocanti calls the charge of intelligence with the enemy "extravagant" which "visibly embarrassed the accuser Thomas during his own indictment".

== Bibliography ==
- Chandet, Henriette (1945-01-01). Le procès Maurras (in French). FeniXX réédition numérique. ISBN 978-2-307-18812-4.
- Fillon, Catherine (2008). "Le procès de Charles Maurras (24-27 janvier 1945)". Histoire de la justice (in French). 18 (1): 59. doi:10.3917/rhj.018.0059. ISSN 1639-4399. S2CID 191559144.
- Stéphane Giocanti (dir.), chap. 7 « Le procès Maurras », dans Charles Maurras : le chaos et l'ordre, Paris, Flammarion, 2008, 575 p. (ISBN 978-2-08-122110-9, lire en ligne), p. 458-473
- Maudhuy, Roger (2011). "5: Charles Maurras ou l'homme qui s'est trompé d'époque". Vichy, les procès de la collaboration (in French). Ixelles Editions. ISBN 978-2-87515-379-1.
- Mège, Philippe (2003). Charles Maurras et le germanisme (in French). L'Æncre. ISBN 978-2-911202-59-9.
- Sanders, Alain (25–28 January 1995). "Le procès de Charles Maurras" (PDF). Présent.
- Sapiro, Gisèle (2010). "Punir la violence des mots: les procès des intellectuels français au sortir de la deuxième guerre mondiale". L'Esprit Créateur. 50 (4): 4–19. doi:10.1353/esp.2010.a407012. JSTOR 26289675. S2CID 161633467.
