= L'Événement (1872) =

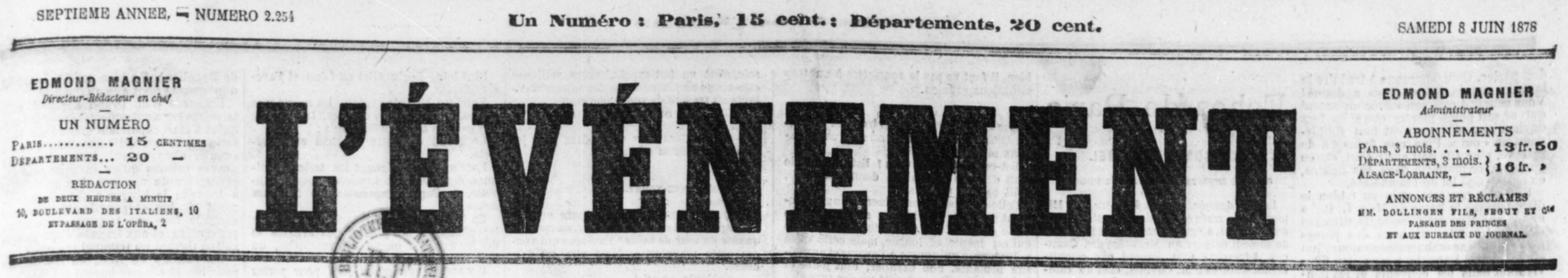
- Founder(s): Edmond Magnier and Auguste Dumont
- Editor: Edmond Magnier (1872–1895)
- Founded: 1872
- Ceased publication: 1966
- Language: French
- Headquarters: Paris
- Country: France
- Price: 15 centimes
- ISSN: 1256-0006

L'Événement was a French daily newspaper focused on politics and literature, established in 1872.

== History ==
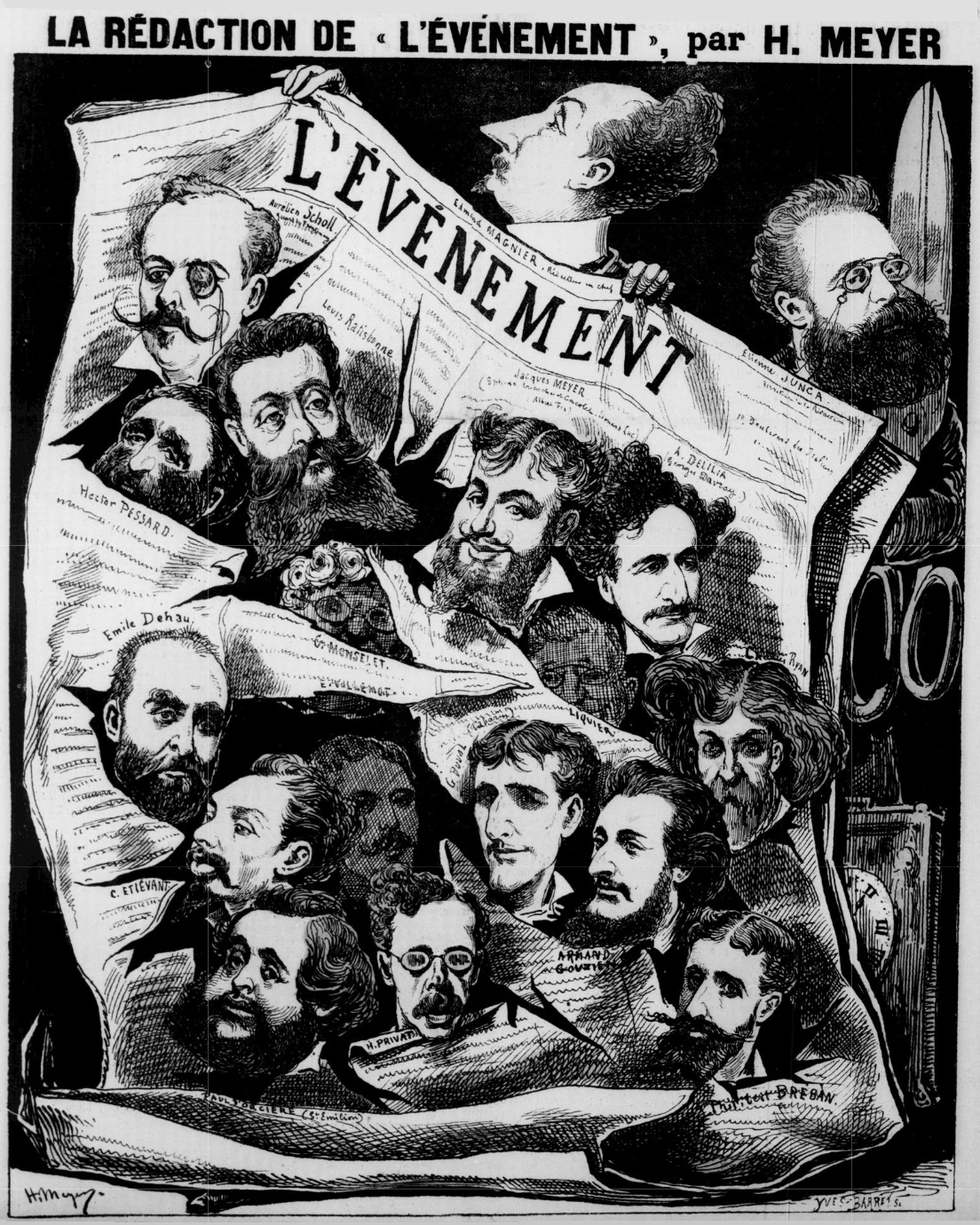
Caricature of the editors of L'Événement by Henri Meyer (1875).

The idea for L'Événement was conceived in the autumn of 1870 but was delayed due to the upheavals of the Franco-Prussian War and the Paris Commune. The newspaper was launched on 7 April 1872. Its founders, Edmond Magnier and Auguste Dumont, were former contributors to Le Figaro. Magnier initially took on the role of editor-in-chief and later also became the administrative director, a position relinquished by Dumont in December of that year.

The newspaper's headquarters were located at 10 Boulevard des Italiens.

In its inaugural issue, L'Événement declared its support for the French Third Republic, differentiating itself from its inspirations, Le Figaro and Le Gaulois. Magnier described the newspaper as a "republican 'Figaro'".

Initially moderate and supportive of President Adolphe Thiers' centre-left policies, the paper soon shifted leftward, notably endorsing Désiré Barodet in the 1873 by-election for the Seine constituency.

By the late 1870s, L'Événement reached its peak influence and served as a platform for the Union républicaine, the parliamentary group associated with Léon Gambetta. Financially, it was regarded as an unofficial outlet for the Crédit Foncier de France, headed at the time by Albert Christophle.

In 1895, L'Événement was purchased by Gustave Laplace, and while Magnier initially retained his positions, he was forced to resign a few months later due to his involvement in the Southern Railways scandal.

After ceasing daily publication during World War I, the newspaper eventually closed in 1966.

== Contributors ==
Prominent contributors to L'Événement included:

- Arsène Alexandre
- Paul Arène
- Philibert Audebrand
- Charles Maurras
