= Charles Maurras =

French political philosopher (1868–1952)

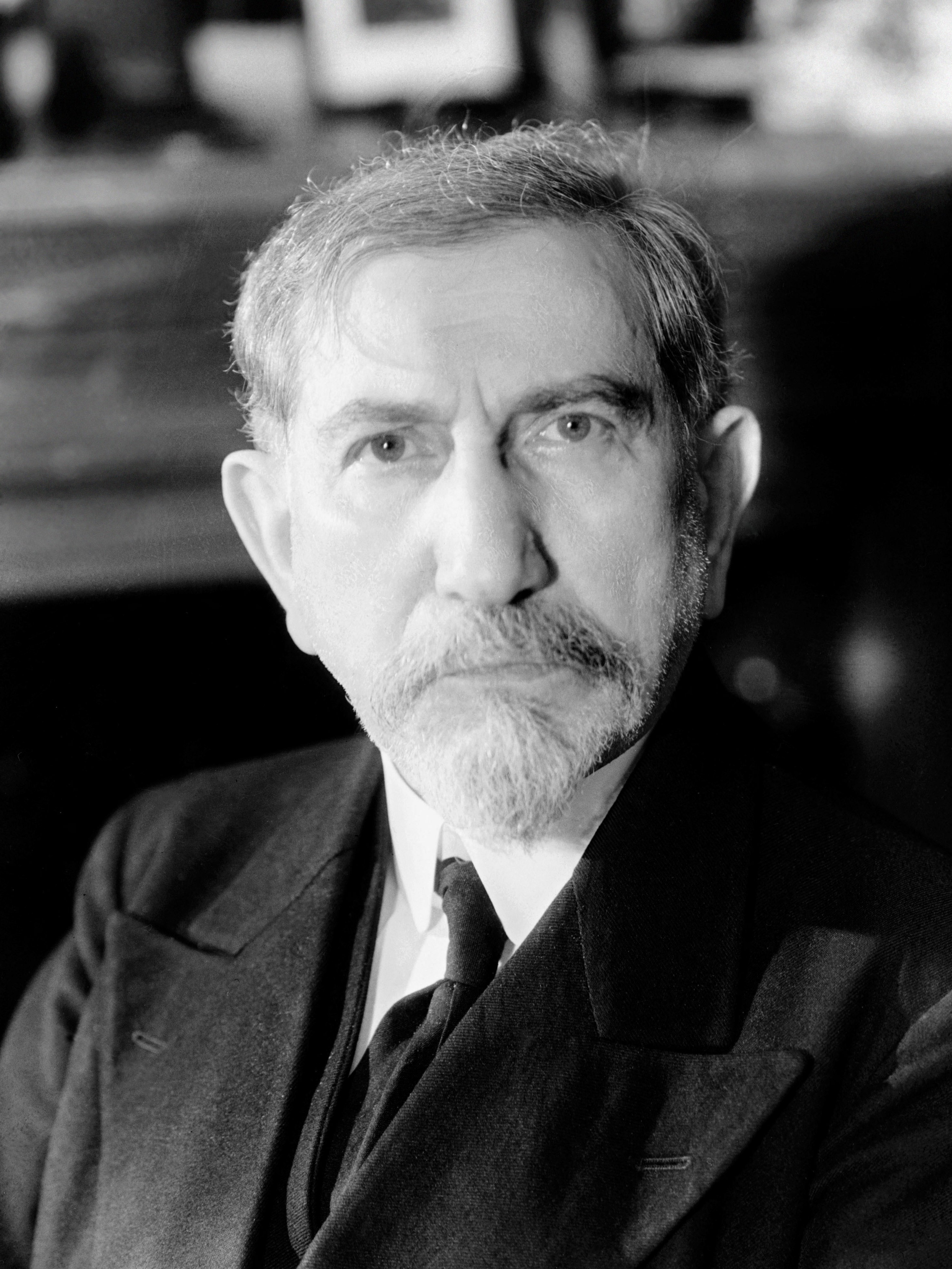
- Maurras in 1937
- Born: Charles-Marie-Photius Maurras; 20 April 1868; Martigues, Bouches-du-Rhône, Second French Empire
- Died: 16 November 1952 (aged 84); Tours, French Fourth Republic
- Awards: Order of the Francisque

Philosophical work
- Era: 20th century philosophy
- Region: Western philosophy
- School: Maurrassisme; Positivism; Royalism; Integral nationalism; Reactionism
- Main interests: Political philosophy
- Notable works: Enquête sur la monarchie; L'Avenir de l'intelligence; Kiel et Tanger; Devant l'Allemagne éternelle

Signature
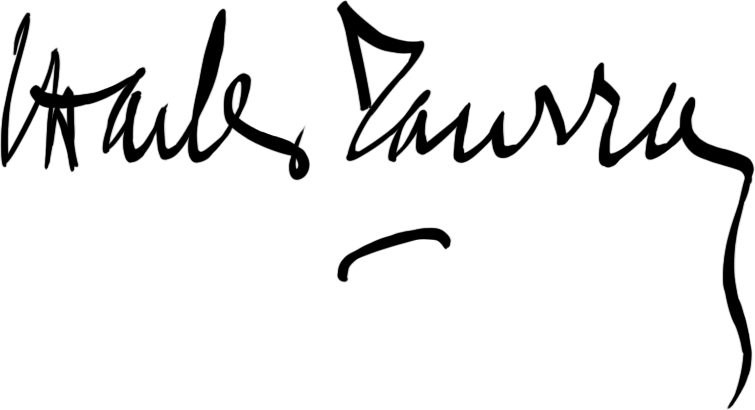

Charles-Marie-Photius Maurras (/mɔːˈrɑːs/; French: [ʃaʁl moʁas]; 20 April 1868 – 16 November 1952) was a French author, politician, poet and critic. He was an organiser and principal philosopher of Action Française, a political movement that was monarchist, medievalist, conservative, corporatist, integralist, nationalist and counter-revolutionary. Maurras was staunchly against capitalism, communism, Freemasonry, liberalism, Islam, Jews, Nazism and Protestantism. His ideas greatly influenced National Catholicism and integral nationalism, and led to the political doctrine of Maurrassisme.

While raised Roman Catholic, Maurras went deaf and became an agnostic in his youth, but remained anti-secularist and supported the Catholic Church solely for political reasons. An Orléanist, he began his career by writing literary criticism and became politically active as a leading anti-Dreyfusard. In 1926, Pope Pius XI issued a papal condemnation of Action Française. In 1927, several of Maurras's works were put in the Index of Forbidden Books, Action Française became the first newspaper ever to be placed on the Catholic Church's list of banned books, and AF members were forbidden from receiving the sacraments; the ban would later be lifted by Pope Pius XII in 1939.

In 1936, after voicing death threats against the socialist politician Léon Blum, Maurras was sentenced to eight months in La Santé. Maurras was elected to the Académie Française in 1938 and later expelled in 1945. During the World War II Maurras opposed Nazi Germany and Fascist Italy, but supported Vichy France, believing that Free France was a puppet state of the Soviet Union. He explained his support for Vichy, writing: "As a royalist I never lost sight of the necessity of monarchy. But to enthrone the royal heir, the heritage had to be saved." After Vichy's collapse he was arrested and accused of complicity with the enemy. Following a political trial he was convicted of incitement to murder, and received Indignité nationale and a life sentence. In 1951, after falling ill, he was transferred to a hospital and subsequently received a medical pardon. In his final days he reverted to Catholicism and received the last rites shortly before his death.

As a political theorist and major right-wing intellectual of 20th-century Europe, Maurras significantly influenced right-wing and far-right ideologies, anticipating some of the ideas of fascism. He has been described as the most important French conservative intellectual, and has directly influenced a large number of politicians, theorists, and writers on both the left and right. Maurras' legacy has remained controversial to this day. Critics have derided him as a "fascist icon", while supporters, including Georges Pompidou, have praised him as a prophet. Others, including Emmanuel Macron, have taken a nuanced approach, with Macron stating: "I fight all the antisemitic ideas of Maurras, but I find it absurd to say that Maurras must no longer exist."

== Biography ==
=== Before the First World War ===
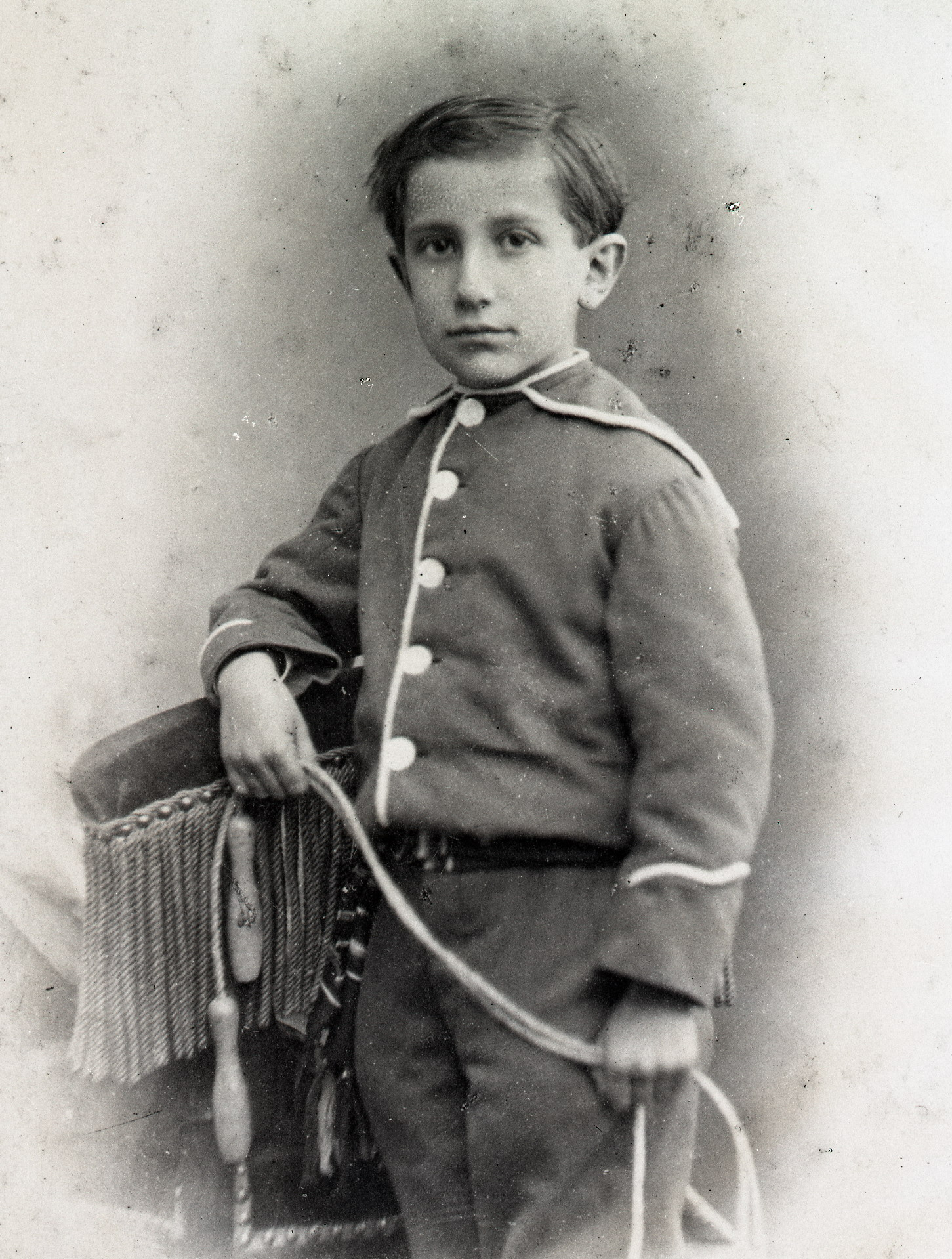
A young Maurras in 1877

Maurras was born into a Provençal family, brought up by his mother and grandmother in a Catholic and monarchist environment. In his early teens, he became deaf. Like many other French politicians, he was affected greatly by France's defeat in the 1870 Franco-Prussian War. After the 1871 Commune of Paris and the 1879 defeat of Patrice de MacMahon's Moral Order government, French society slowly found a consensus for the French Third Republic, symbolised by the rallying of the monarchist Orleanists to the Republic. Maurras published his first article at the age of 17 years in the review Annales de philosophie chrétienne. He then collaborated on various reviews, including L'Événement, La Revue bleue, La Gazette de France and La Revue encyclopédique, in which he praised Classicism and attacked Romanticism.

At some point during his youth Maurras lost his Catholic faith and became an agnostic. In 1887, at the age of seventeen, he came to Paris and began writing literary criticism in the Catholic and Orleanist Observateur. At this time Maurras was influenced by Orleanism, as well as German philosophy reviewed by Catholic thinker Léon Ollé-Laprune, an influence of Henri Bergson, and by the philosopher Maurice Blondel, one of the inspirations of Christian "modernists", who would later become his greatest opponents. He became acquainted with the Provençal poet Frédéric Mistral in 1888 and shared the federalist thesis of Mistral's Félibrige movement (see Maurras and Félibrige). The same year he met the nationalist writer Maurice Barrès.

In 1890 Maurras approved Cardinal Lavigerie's call for the rallying of Catholics to the Republic, thus making his opposition not to the Republic in itself, but to "sectarian Republicanism".

Beside this Orleanist affiliation, Maurras shared some traits with Bonapartism. In December 1887 he demonstrated to the cry of "Down with the robbers!" during the military decorations trafficking scandal, which had involved Daniel Wilson, the son-in-law of President Jules Grévy. Despite this, he initially opposed the nationalist-populist Boulangist philosophy. But in 1889, after a visit to Maurice Barrès, Barrès voted for the Boulangist candidate; despite his "anti-Semitism of the heart" ("anti-sémitisme de coeur"), he decided to vote for a Jew.

During 1894–1895, Maurras briefly worked for Barrès' newspaper La Cocarde (The Cockade), although he sometimes opposed Barrès' opinions concerning the French Revolution. La Cocarde supported General Georges Ernest Boulanger, who had become a threat to the parliamentary Republic in the late 1880s.

During a trip to Athens for the first modern Olympic Games in 1896, Maurras came to criticise the Greek democratic system of the polis, which he considered doomed because of its internal divisions and its openness towards métèques (foreigners).

==== Political involvement ====
Maurras became involved in politics at the time of the Dreyfus affair, becoming an anti-Dreyfusard. He endorsed Hubert-Joseph Henry's forgery, blaming Alfred Dreyfus, as he considered that defending Dreyfus weakened the Army and the justice system. According to Maurras, Dreyfus was to be sacrificed on the altar of national interest. But while the Republican nationalist thinker Barrès accused Dreyfus of being guilty because of his Jewishness, Maurras went a step further, vilifying the "Jewish Republic". While Barrès' anti-Semitism originated both in pseudo-scientific racist contemporary theories and Biblical exegesis, Maurras decried "scientific racism" in favor of a more radical "state anti-Semitism." Maurras assisted with the foundation of the nationalist and anti-Dreyfusard Ligue de la patrie française at the end of 1898, along with Maurice Barrès, the geographer Marcel Dubois, the poet François Coppée and the critic and literature professor Jules Lemaître.

In 1899, Maurras founded the review Action Française (AF), an offshoot of the newspaper created by Maurice Pujo and Henri Vaugeois the year preceding. Maurras quickly became influential in the movement, and converted Pujo and Vaugeois to monarchism, which became the movement's principal cause. With Léon Daudet, he edited the movement's review, La Revue de l'Action Française, which during 1908 became a daily newspaper with the shorter title L'Action Française. The AF mixed integral nationalism with reactionary themes, shifting the nationalist ideology, previously supported by left-wing Republicans, to the political right. It had a wide readership during the implementation of the 1905 law on the separation of Church and State. In 1899 he wrote a short notice in favour of monarchy, "Dictateur et roi" ("Dictator and King"), and then in 1900 his Enquête sur la monarchie (Investigations on Monarchy), published in the Legitimist mouthpiece La Gazette de France, which made him famous. Maurras also published thirteen articles in the newspaper Le Figaro during 1901 and 1902, as well as six articles between November 1902 and January 1903 in Edouard Drumont's anti-Semitic newspaper, La Libre Parole.

Between 1905 and 1908, when the Camelots du Roi monarchist league was initiated, Maurras introduced the concept of political activism through extra-parliamentary leagues, theorising the possibility of a coup d'état. Maurras also founded the Ligue d'Action Française in 1905, whose mission was to recruit members for the Action Française. Members pledged to fight the republican regime and to support restoration of the monarchy under Prince Philippe, Duke of Orléans.

Many early members of the Action Française were practising Catholics, including Bernard de Vésins, the art historian Louis Dimier and the essayist Léon de Montesquiou. They helped Maurras develop the royalist league's pro-Catholic policies.

Maurras entered into a conflict with Paul Granier de Cassagnac editor of L'Autorite, and his brother Guy. The affair ended with a sword duel between Paul de Cassagnac and Charles Maurras which took place in Neuilly on 26 February 1912. Maurras was struck in the forearm, and his arm was seriously injured, which brought the combat to a close.

=== From the First World War to the end of the 1930s ===
Maurras then endorsed France's entry into the First World War (even to the extent of supporting the thoroughly republican Georges Clemenceau) against the German Empire. During the war the Jewish businessman Emile Ullman was forced to resign from the board of directors of the Comptoir d'Escompte bank after Maurras accused him of being a German agent. He then criticised the Treaty of Versailles for not being harsh enough on the Germans and condemned Aristide Briand's policy of cooperation with Germany. In 1923 Germaine Berton carried out the assassination of his fellow Action Française member Marius Plateau. Berton had planned to also assassinate Léon Daudet and Maurras but was unsuccessful.

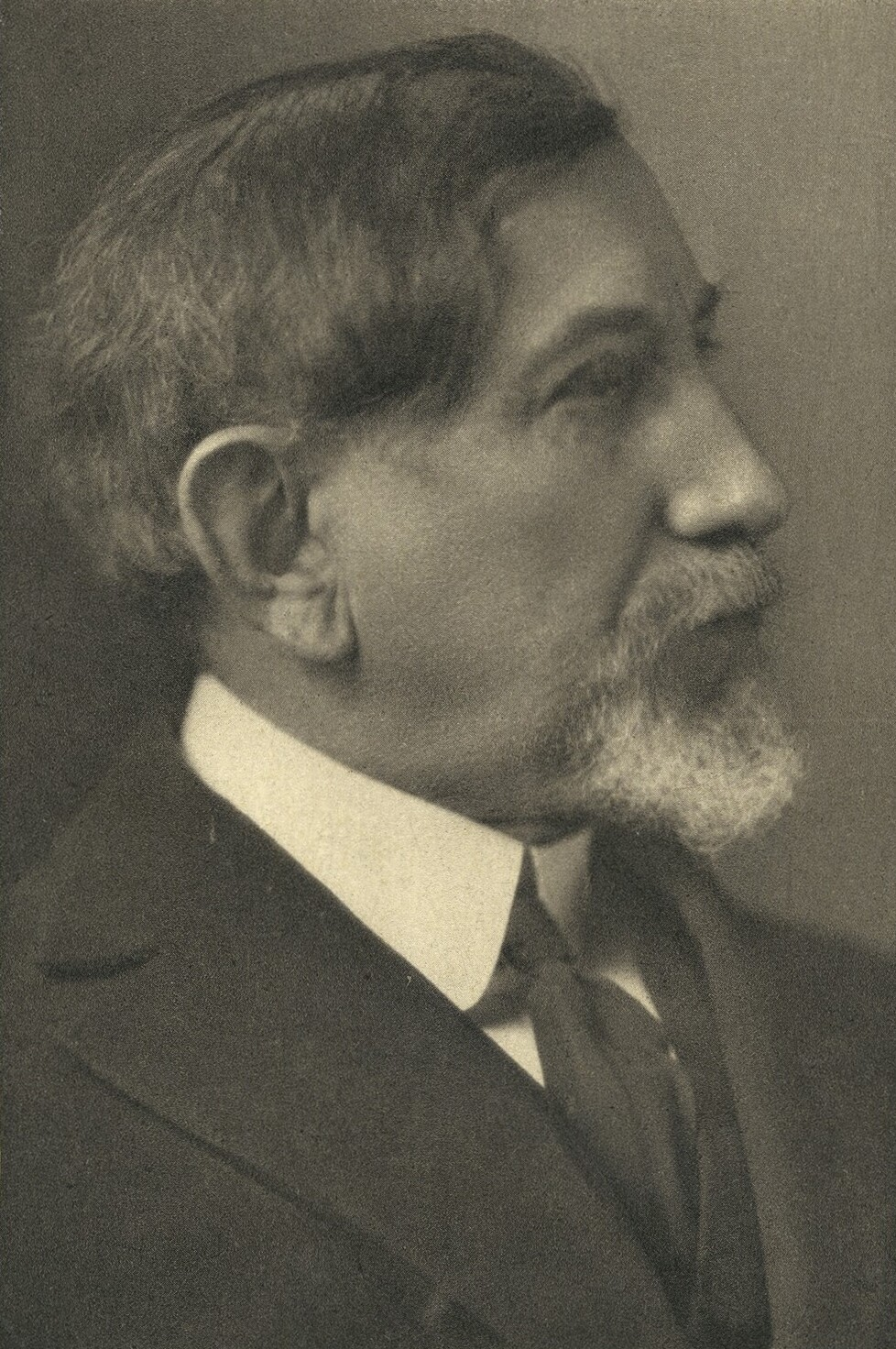
Maurras in 1925

In 1925, he called for the murder of Abraham Schrameck, the Interior Minister of Paul Painlevé's Cartel des Gauches's (left-wing coalition) government, who had ordered the disarming of the far-right leagues. For this death threat, he was sentenced to a fine and a year in jail (suspended).

In 1929, Pope Pius XI condemned the Action Française, which until then was supported by a large number of Catholics, clergy, and laity alike. Several of the works of the Maurras, the movement's founder, were placed into the Index Librorum Prohibitorum, alongside the movement's official newspaper. This was a devastating blow to the movement. On 8 March 1927, AF members were prohibited from receiving the sacraments. Many of its members left (two Catholics who were forced to look for a different path in politics and life were the writers François Mauriac and Georges Bernanos) and it entered a period of decline.

Maurras again voiced death threats against the President of the Council (prime minister) Léon Blum, organiser of the Popular Front, in the Action Française of 15 May 1936, emphasising his Jewish origins (he once called him an "old semitic camel"). This other death threat earned him eight months in prison, from 29 October 1936 to 6 July 1937. While imprisoned, he received the support of Marie-Pauline Martin, Henry Bordeaux, Pius XI and up to 60,000 sympathetic citizens. Fearing communism, he joined the pacifists and praised the Munich Agreement of 1938, which the President of the Council Édouard Daladier had signed without any illusions. He also wrote in Action Française:

There are certain conservatives in France who fill us with disgust. Why? Because of their stupidity. What kind of stupidity? Hitlerism. These French "conservatives" crawl on their bellies before Hitler. These former nationalists cringe before him. A few zealots wallow in dirt, in their own dirt, with endless Heils. The wealthier they are, the more they own, the more important it is to make them understand that if Hitler invaded us he would skin them much more thoroughly than Blum, Thorez and Stalin combined. This "conservative" error is suicidal. We must appeal to our friends not to let themselves be befogged. We must tell them: Be on your guard! What is now at stake is not anti-democracy or anti-Semitism. France above all!

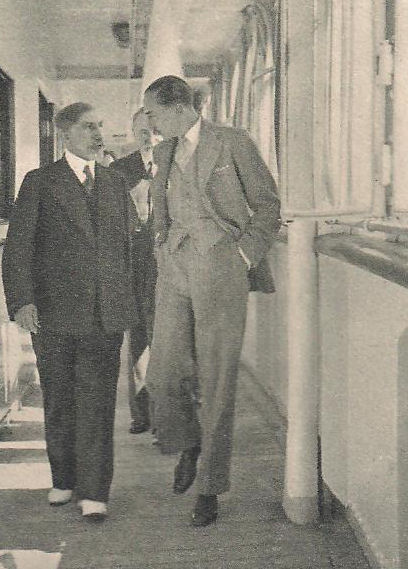
Maurras with Henri, Count of Paris in 1934

During the 1930s – especially after the 6 February 1934 crisis—many of Action Française members turned to fascism, including Robert Brasillach, Lucien Rebatet, Abel Bonnard, Paul Chack and Claude Jeantet. Most of them belonged to the staff of the fascist newspaper Je suis partout (I am everywhere).

Influencing António de Oliveira Salazar's Estado Novo regime in Portugal, Maurras also supported Francisco Franco and, until spring 1939, Benito Mussolini's Fascist regime. Opposing Adolf Hitler because he was anti-German, Maurras himself criticised the racist policies of Nazism in 1936, and requested a complete translation of Mein Kampf – some passages had been censored in the French edition.

After his failure against Charles Jonnart in 1924 to be elected to the Académie française, he succeeded in entering the ranks of the "Immortals" on 9 June 1938, replacing Henri-Robert, winning by 20 votes against 12 to Fernand Gregh. He was received into the Academy on 8 June 1939 by the Catholic writer Henry Bordeaux. In the same year, Pope Pius XII repealed his predecessor's condemnation of the Action Française.

=== Vichy France, arrest and death ===
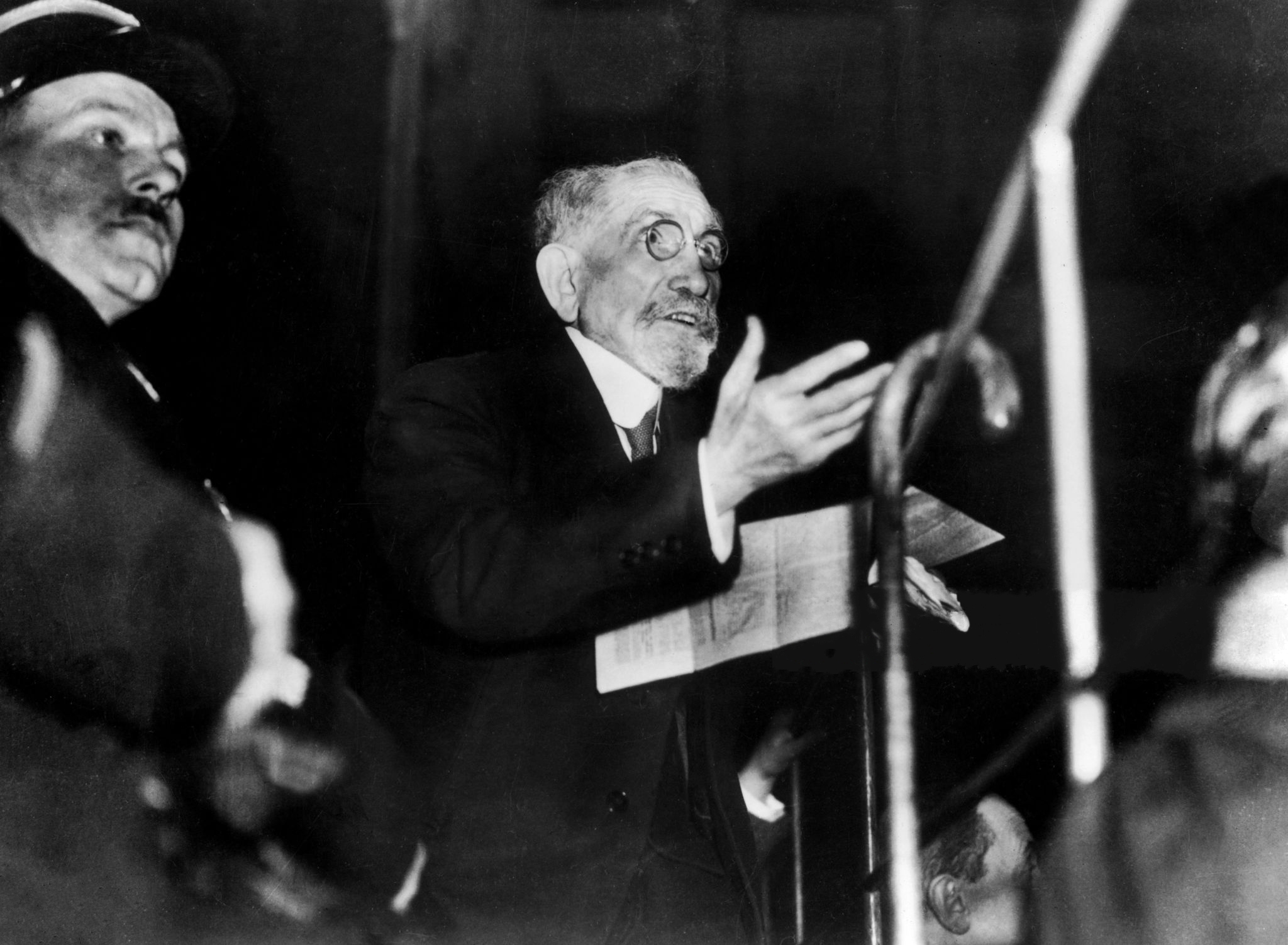
Maurras on trial in 1945

In June 1940, articles in Action Française signed by Maurras, Léon Daudet, and Maurice Pujo praised General Charles de Gaulle. While Maurras described Marshal Philippe Pétain as a "divine surprise", the statement is usually quoted without context; Maurras was referring specifically to Pétain having political talent as well as being a symbol of France, and there is no evidence of the remark until February 1941.

Vichy France's reactionary program of a Révolution Nationale (National Revolution) was fully approved of by Maurras, who inspired large parts of it. The monarchist newspaper was forbidden in the Occupied Zone and under Vichy censorship in the Southern Zone from November 1942. In La Seule France (1941) Maurras argued for a policy of France d'abord ("France First"), whereby France would restore itself politically and morally under Pétain, resolving what Maurras saw as the causes of France's defeat in 1940, before dealing with the issue of the foreign occupation. This position was contrasted to the attitude of the Gaullists, who fled France and continued the military struggle. Maurras savaged the pre-war French governments for taking an increasingly bellicose position vis-à-vis Germany at precisely the same time that these governments were weakening France, militarily, socially and politically, thereby making France's defeat during 1940 all but inevitable. Maurras also criticised the 1940 Law on the status of Jews for being too moderate. At the same time, he continued to express elements of his longstanding antipathy towards Germany by arguing in La Seule France that Frenchmen must not be drawn to that country's model and by hosting anti-German conferences, and he opposed both the "dissidents" in London and the collaborators in Paris and Vichy (such as Lucien Rebatet, Robert Brasillach, Pierre Laval or Marcel Déat). In 1943 the Germans planned to arrest Maurras.

A pre-war admirer of de Gaulle, who himself had been influenced by Maurras' integralism, Maurras then harshly criticised the General in exile. He later claimed he believed that Pétain was playing a "double game", working for an Allied victory in secret.

After the liberation of France, Maurras was arrested in September 1944 together with his right-hand man Maurice Pujo, and indicted before the High Court of Lyon for "complicity with the enemy" on the basis of the articles he had published since the beginning of the war. At the end of the trial, during which there were many irregularities such as false dating or truncated quotations, Maurras was sentenced to life imprisonment and deprivation of civil liberties. He was automatically dismissed from the Académie française (a measure included in the ordinance of 26 December 1944). His response to his conviction was to exclaim C'est la revanche de Dreyfus! ("It's Dreyfus's revenge!")

According to the historian Eugen Weber the trial against Maurras was political and was rigged against him. Weber writes that the jurors who were chosen for Maurras' case were taken from a list drawn up by his political enemies.

Meanwhile, the Académie française declared his seat vacant, as it had for Pétain's, instead of expelling him as it did for Abel Hermant and Abel Bonnard. (The academy waited until his death to elect his successor, and chose Antoine de Lévis-Mirepoix, who was himself influenced by Action Française and collaborated with Pierre Boutang's monarchist review La Nation Française.)

After being imprisoned in Riom and then Clairvaux, Maurras was released in March 1952 to be hospitalised. He was supported by Henry Bordeaux, who repeatedly asked the President of the Republic, Vincent Auriol, to pardon Maurras. Although weakened, Maurras collaborated with Aspects de la France, which had replaced the outlawed review Action Française in 1947. He was transferred to a clinic in Tours, where he died soon afterwards. In his last days, he readopted the Catholic faith of his childhood and received the last rites.

== Work ==
=== Félibrige ===
A Provence-born author, Maurras joined Félibrige, a literary and cultural association founded by Frédéric Mistral and other Provençal writers to defend and promote Occitan languages and literature. The name of the association was derived from félibre, a Provençal word meaning pupil or follower.

=== Political thought ===
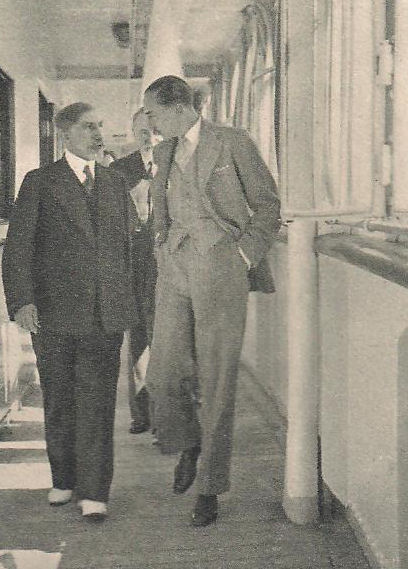
Maurras with Henri of Orléans in 1934

Maurras' political ideas were based on intense nationalism (what he described as "integral nationalism") and a belief in an ordered society based on strong government. These were the bases of his endorsement for both the French monarchy and the Roman Catholic Church.

He formulated an aggressive political strategy, which contrasted with the Legitimists' apathy for political action. He managed to combine the paradox of a reactionary thought which would actively change history, a form of Counter-revolution opposed to simple conservatism. His "integral nationalism" rejected all democratic principles which he judged contrary to "natural inequality", criticising all evolution since the 1789 French Revolution, and advocated the return to a hereditary monarchy.

Like many people in Europe at the time, he was haunted by the idea of "decadence", partly inspired by his reading of the publications of Hippolyte Taine and Ernest Renan, and admired classicism. He felt that France had lost its grandeur during the French Revolution in 1789, a grandeur inherited from its origins as a province of the Roman Empire and forged by, as he put it, "forty kings who in a thousand years made France." The French Revolution, he wrote in the Observateur Français, was negative and destructive.

Maurras traced this decline further back, to the Enlightenment and the Reformation; he described the source of the evil as "Swiss ideas", a reference to the adopted nation of John Calvin and the birth nation of Jean-Jacques Rousseau. Maurras further blamed France's decline on "Anti-France", which he defined as the "four confederate states of Protestants, Jews, Freemasons and foreigners" (his actual word for the latter being the xenophobic term métèques). Indeed, to him the first three were all "internal foreigners."

Antisemitism and anti-Protestantism were common themes in his writings. He believed that the Reformation, the Enlightenment and the eventual outcome of the French Revolution and Napoleonic Wars had all contributed to individuals valuing themselves more than the nation, with consequent negative effects on the latter, and that democracy, modernism and secular liberalism were only making matters worse.

Although Maurras advocated the revival of monarchy, in many ways, Maurras did not typify the French monarchist tradition. His endorsement of the monarchy and Catholicism was explicitly pragmatic, as he alleged that a state religion was the only way of maintaining public order. By contrast with Maurice Barrès, a theorist of a kind of Romantic nationalism based on the Ego, Maurras claimed to base his opinions on reason rather than on sentiment, loyalty, and faith.

Paradoxically, he admired the positivist philosopher Auguste Comte, like many of the Third Republic politicians he detested, with which he opposed German idealism. Whereas the Legitimist monarchists refused to engage in political action, retreating into an intransigently conservative Catholicism and a relative indifference to a modern world they believed was irredeemably wicked and apostate, Maurras was prepared to engage in political action, both orthodox and unorthodox (the Action Française's Camelots du Roi league frequently engaged in street violence with left-wing opponents, as well as Marc Sangnier's socialist Catholic Le Sillon). Maurras was twice convicted of inciting violence against Jewish politicians, and Léon Blum, the first Jewish French prime minister, nearly died from the injuries inflicted by associates of Maurras. His slogan was the phrase "La politique d'abord!" ("Politics first!"). Other influences included Frédéric Le Play, British empiricism, which allowed him to reconcile Cartesian rationalism with empiricism, and René de La Tour du Pin.

Maurras' religious views were likewise less than orthodox. He supported the political Catholic Church both because it was intimately involved with French history and because its hierarchical structure and clerical elite mirrored his image of an ideal society. He considered the Church to be the mortar which held France together, and the association linking all Frenchmen together. However, he distrusted the Gospels, written, as he put it, "by four obscure Jews", but admired the Catholic Church for having allegedly concealed much of the Bible's "dangerous teachings". Maurras' interpretation of the Gospels and integralist teachings were fiercely criticised by many Catholic clergy. However, towards the end of his life, Maurras eventually converted from agnosticism to Catholicism.

Notwithstanding his religious unorthodoxy, Maurras gained a large following among French monarchists and Catholics, including the Assumptionists and the Orleanist pretender to the French throne, the comte de Paris, Philippe. Nonetheless, his agnosticism worried parts of the Catholic hierarchy, and in 1926 Pope Pius XI placed some of Maurras's writings on the Index of Forbidden Books and condemned the Action Française philosophy as a whole. Seven of Maurras' books had already been placed on this list in 1914 and a dossier on Maurras had been submitted to Pius X.

It was not just his agnosticism which worried the Catholic hierarchy, but that by insisting upon politiques d'abord he questioned the primacy of the spiritual and thus the teaching authority of the Church and the authority of the Pope himself. That this was the basis of the matter is shown by Jacques Maritain's book Primauté du Spirituel. Maritain was associated with L'Action Française and knew Maurras. While his unease with the movement pre-dates the 1926 crisis, it was this which occasioned his alienation from Maurras and L'Action Française. This papal condemnation was a great surprise to many of his devotees, who included a considerable number of French clergy, and caused great damage to the movement. The papal ban was later ended by Pope Pius XII in 1939, a year after Maurras was elected to the Académie française.

=== Legacy ===
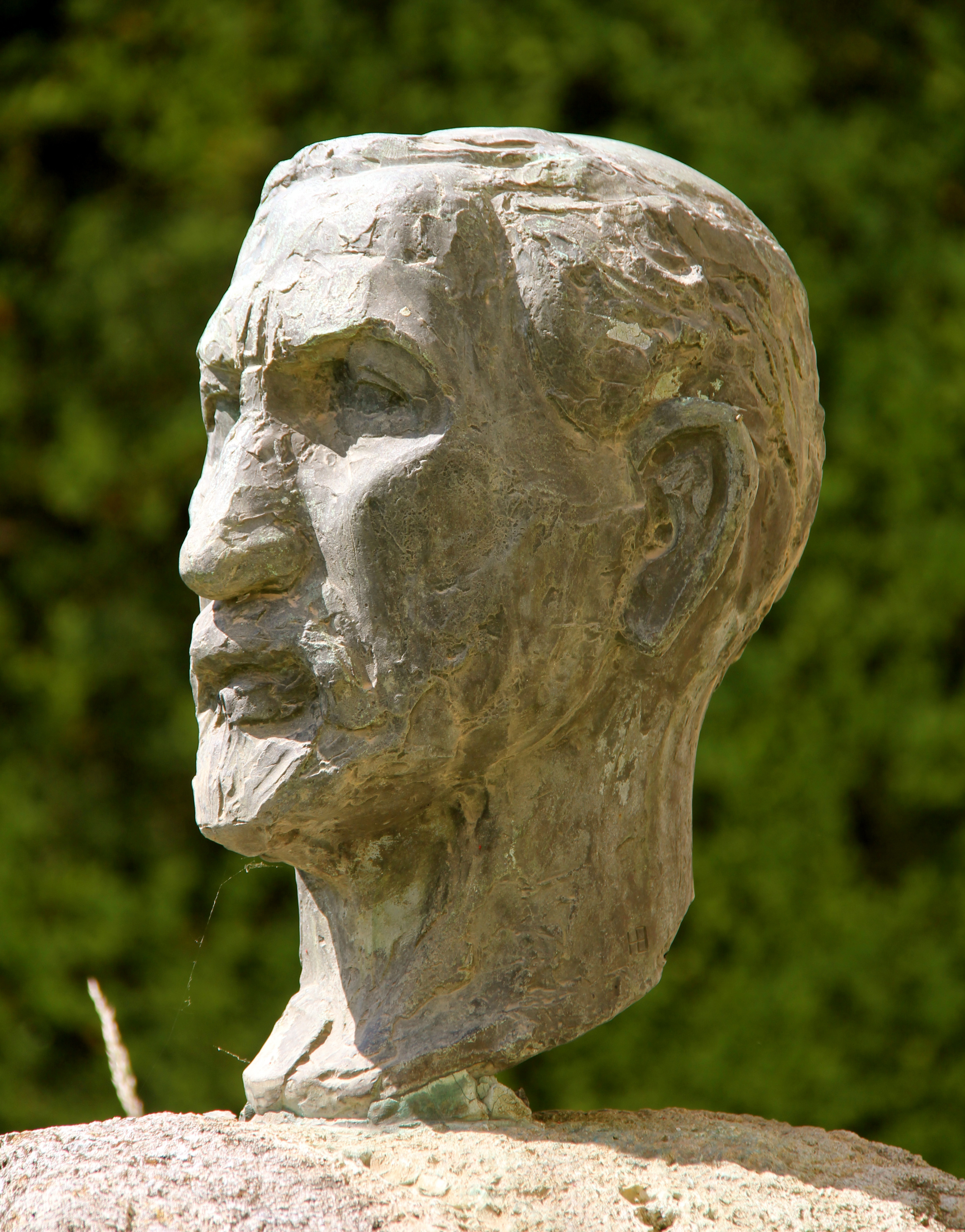
Bust of Maurras' head in Martigues

Maurras was a major intellectual influence of integral nationalism, national Catholicism, Latin conservatism, and far-right movements. He and the Action Française influenced many people and movements including General Francisco Franco, José Antonio Primo de Rivera, António Sardinha, Leon Degrelle, the historian and journalist Álvaro Alcalá-Galiano y Osma and autonomist movements in Europe. The Christian Democrat Jacques Maritain was also close to Maurras before the papal condemnation of the AF in 1927, and criticised democracy in one of his early writings, Une opinion sur Charles Maurras ou le devoir des catholiques. Furthermore, Maurrassism also influenced many writings from members of the Organisation armée secrète who theorised "counter-revolutionary warfare". In Spain, the far-right Acción Española was strongly influenced by Maurras's movement both in its monarchism and name.

The influence extended to Latin America, as in Mexico where Jesús Guiza y Acevedo was nicknamed "the little Maurras", as well as the historian Carlos Pereyra or the Venezuelan author Laureano Vallenilla Lanz, who wrote a book titled Cesarismo democrático (Democratic Caesarism). Maurras' thought also influenced Catholic fundamentalist supporters of the Brazilian dictatorship (1964–85) as well as the Cursillos de la Cristiandad (Christendom Courses), similar to the Cité Catholique group, which were initiated during 1950 by the bishop of Ciudad Real, Mgr. Hervé. The Argentine militarist Juan Carlos Onganía, who overthrew Arturo Illia in a military putsch in 1966, as well as Alejandro Agustín Lanusse, who succeeded Onganía after another coup, had participated in the Cursillos de la Cristiandad, as did also the Dominican militarists Antonio Imbert Barrera and Elías Wessin y Wessin, chief of staff of the military and an opponent of the restoration of the 1963 Constitution after Rafael Trujillo was deposed. In Argentina he also influenced the nationalist writers of the 1920s and 1930s such as Rodolfo Irazusta and Juan Carulla.

In 2017, Michael Crowley wrote that Steve Bannon, then chief strategist to U.S. President Donald Trump, "has also expressed admiration for the reactionary French philosopher Charles Maurras, according to French media reports confirmed by Politico."

== Works ==
- 1889 : Théodore Aubanel
- 1891 : Jean Moréas
- 1894 : Le Chemin du Paradis, mythes et fabliaux
- 1896–1899 : Le voyage d'Athènes
- 1898 : L'Idée de la décentralisation
- 1899 : Trois idées politiques : Chateaubriand, Michelet, Sainte-Beuve
- 1900 : Enquête sur la monarchie
- 1901 : Anthinéa : d'Athènes à Florence (with Lettres des Jeux olympiques)
- 1902 : Les Amants de Venise, George Sand et Musset
- 1905 : L'Avenir de l'intelligence
- 1906 : Le Dilemme de Marc Sangnier
- 1910 : Si le coup de force est possible
- 1910 : Kiel et Tanger
- 1912 : La Politique religieuse
- 1914 : L'Action Française et la Religion Catholique
- 1915 : L'Étang de Berre
- 1916 : Quand les Français ne s'aimaient pas
- 1916–1918 : Les Conditions de la victoire, 4 volumes
- 1921 : Tombeaux
- 1922 : Inscriptions
- 1923 : Poètes
- 1924 : L'Allée des philosophes
- 1925 : La Musique intérieure
- 1925 : Barbarie et poésie
- 1927 : L'Action française et le Vatican
- 1927 : Lorsque Hugo eut les cent ans
- 1928 : Le prince des nuées
- 1928 : Un débat sur le romantisme
- 1928 : Vers un art intellectuel
- 1928 : L'Anglais qui a connu la France
- 1929 : Corps glorieux ou Vertu de la perfection
- 1929 : Promenade italienne
- 1929 : Napoléon pour ou contre la France
- 1930 : De Démos à César
- 1930 : Corse et Provence
- 1930 : Quatre nuits de Provence
- 1931 : Triptyque de Paul Bourget
- 1931 : Le Quadrilatère
- 1931 : Au signe de Flore
- 1932 : Heures immortelles
- 1932–1933 : Dictionnaire politique et critique, 5 volumes
- 1935 : Prologue d'un essai sur la critique
- 1937 : Quatre poèmes d'Eurydice
- 1937 : L'amitié de Platon
- 1937 : Jacques Bainville et Paul Bourget
- 1937 : Les vergers sur la mer
- 1937 : Jeanne d'Arc, Louis XIV, Napoléon
- 1937 : Devant l'Allemagne éternelle
- 1937 : Mes idées politiques
- 1937 : La Dentelle du Rempart
- 1940 : Pages africaines
- 1941 : Sous la muraille des cyprès
- 1941 : Mistral
- 1941 : La Seule France
- 1942 : De la colère à la justice
- 1943 : Pour un réveil français
- 1944 : Poésie et vérité
- 1944 : Paysages mistraliens
- 1944 : Le Pain et le Vin
- 1945 : Au-devant de la nuit
- 1945 : L'Allemagne et nous
- 1947 : Les Deux Justices ou Notre J'accuse
- 1948 : L'Ordre et le Désordre
- 1948 : Maurice Barrès
- 1948 : Une promotion de Judas
- 1948 : Réponse à André Gide
- 1949 : Au Grand Juge de France
- 1949 : Le Cintre de Riom
- 1950 : Mon jardin qui s'est souvenu
- 1950 : Le Mont de Saturne
- 1951 : Tragi-comédie de ma surdité
- 1951 : Vérité, justice, patrie (with Maurice Pujo)
- 1952 : À mes vieux oliviers
- 1952 : La Balance intérieure
- 1952 : Le Beau Jeu des reviviscences
- 1952 : Le Bienheureux Pie X, sauveur de la France
- 1953 : Pascal puni (published posthumously)
- 1958: Lettres de prison (1944–1952) (published posthumously)
- 1966: Lettres passe-murailles, correspondance échangée avec Xavier Vallat (1950–1952) (published posthumously)

English translations

- 2016: The Future of the Intelligentsia & For a French Awakening, Arktos Media. ISBN 978-1910524985
