= Le Mont de Saturne =

1950 book by Charles Maurras

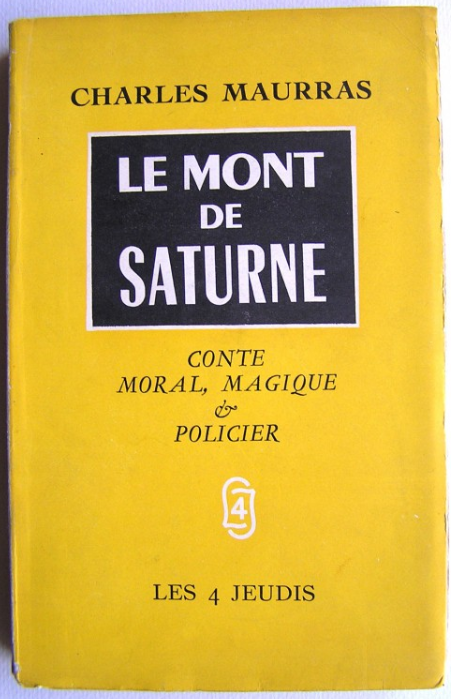
- Editor: Les Quatre Jeudis
- Author: Charles Maurras
- Publication date: 1950
- Publication place: France

Le Mont de Saturne is a novel intertwining fictional and autobiographic narrative of French journalist and politician Charles Maurras, director of L'Action française, published on 1950. The story follows the imagined life of famous author Denys Talon, who commits suicide at the age of forty.

== Presentation ==
=== Context ===
Maurras wrote this text during his incarceration in Lyon between September 11 and 29, 1944 and dedicated it to his friend Maurice Pujo. It is followed by an "Afterword and Critique of the Mount of Saturn". However, the idea of Le Mont de Saturne would go back to the beginning of the century according to Georges Meunier who questioned Charles Maurras in his book Ce qu'ils pensent du Merveilleux published in 1911.

=== Synopsis ===
The story is presented as the one-act autobiography of a talented writer named Denys Talon who commits suicide at the age of forty "but whose corpse looks like a worn-out octogenarian". The text therefore serves as a testament. There palmistry is employed in the narrative as a "satire of Bergsonism through a policeman who followed Bergson's lectures". The story intertwines "romantic lyricism [and] memories of Provence [...] in this tale full of the unexpected".

=== Analysis ===
Le Mont de Saturne is a "kind of cookie-cutter romantic autobiography" whose main character Denys Talon embodies an "alter ego" of Maurras according to Professor Ivan Peter Barko. Martin Motte compares him to "a Maurras who would have given in to his inner demons". This book makes it possible to apprehend "the occultist side, a certain penchant for the fantastic, [and] the supernatural" in Maurras.

Le Mont de Saturne is all the more interesting because of the irony that the author demonstrates at the reader's expense, but above all thanks to "the self-irony of the poet". Maurras amuses himself by confusing the reader through his "Postface et Critique du Mont de Saturne" by warning "that he does not refute [not] the autobiographical interpretation"..

He also uses the duplication process: he stages himself, a Maurras in the third person, an episodic character, a Maurras in silhouette, no doubt to better hide the autobiographical character of the hero, Denys Talon. The biographical allusions to the man whom the author calls Maurras are of only mediocre interest: they are trivial. It is Denys Talon who holds all our attention and whose secret can only be deciphered by an allegorical reading. Because Le Mont de Saturne can be read on several levels: at the philosophical, satirical, anecdotal and allegorical levels.

— Ivan Peter Barko

The hero commits a suicide attempt often transposed to the author's own suicide attempt when he was fifteen. It would actually be an "allegorical suicide" to illustrate the "great spiritual conflict of his existence". Historian Bruno Goyet agrees with this analysis by considering that this text "directly refers to one of the deepest crises of his inner life".

== Bibliography ==
- Goyet, Bruno (2002). "Récits d'enfance et de jeunesse dans l'œuvre de Charles Maurras, entre stigmatisation et revendication". Genèses. 47 (2): 62. doi:10.3917/gen.047.0062. ISSN 1155-3219.
- Barko, Ivan Peter (1973). "La signification autobiographique du Mystère d'Ulysse et du Mont de Saturne". Études maurrassiennes. Aix-en-Provence: 31-40.
