= La Seule France =

1941 book by Charles Maurras

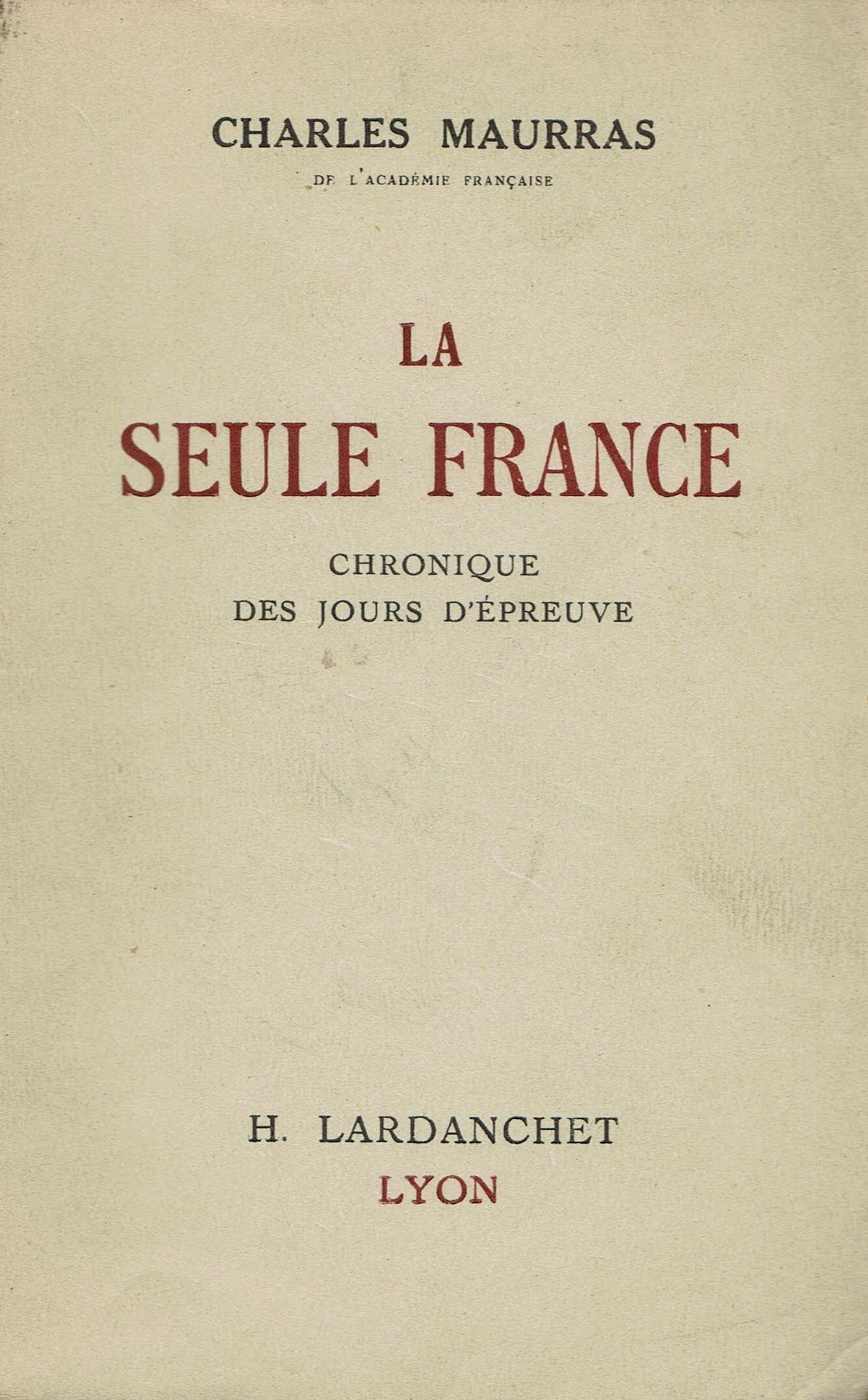
- Editor: H. Lardanchet
- Author: Charles Maurras
- Publication date: 1941
- Publication place: France

La Seule France (France Alone) is a book published in 1941 by the journalist and French politician Charles Maurras, director of L'Action française. Maurras supports an isolationist position between Nazi Germany and Great Britain during World War II, and was resolutely opposed to collaborationism.

== Presentation ==
=== Context ===
On June 22, 1940, the armistice was concluded between Nazi Germany and the last government of the French Third Republic. As early as June 26, 1940, Maurras recognized the competence of Marshal Pétain and General Weygand to request the Armistice in a declaration made at Villefranche-de-Rouergue.

"French Unity first !" In unity everything can live again. But if we had the misfortune to divide ourselves - even with the illusion of facing the victorious adversary - this division would never benefit anyone but him. We have no other chance than in the proud and strong maintenance of the national unity embodied by Marshal Pétain and his collaborators. However sad and hard the situation may be, one thing can make it worse : and that is the tearing of the tunic of the Fatherland. Now, those who tend to this crime are precisely those responsible for this ill-prepared war, those who have caused us to lose in ten months the effort of ten centuries.

— Charles Maurras, La seule France : chronique des jours d'épreuve, H. Lardanchet, 1941.

For Maurras, the armistice offered "the substantial possibility of a reorganization from within" with a view to defeating Germany.

In the spring of 1941, Maurras published La Seul France. Chronicle of the days of trial, first book of reflection since the collapse of June 1940. The book is dedicated to Marshal Pétain and proclaims his support for the Révolution nationale, judged as the country's only hope for recovery.

=== The reasons for the defeat ===
In relation to the defeat of 1940, Charles Maurras advances three explanations: the Treaty of Versailles which precipitated Germany into revanchism, the strategy of Great Britain which had constantly weakened the position of France since 1919 and the game of anti-national minorities which had precipitated France into a conflict which was not its own.

=== Isolationism and anti-Germanism ===
As a visceral anti-Germanist, Maurras categorically rejects fraternization with Germany:

I am not European, I am French, French of the only clan of France. Germany has won, that's up to her, England has thrown us in the face of catastrophe, so much the better for her if she escapes, we have no more to pull her out of it than she does. took the trouble to get out of it ourselves. France ! France ! It is to the salvation of France that we have the duty and the right to devote ourselves exclusively.

— Charles Maurras, La seule France : chronique des jours d'épreuve, H. Lardanchet, 1941.

Maurras refuses to choose between Germany and England and therefore defends an isolationist position hostile to collaborationism. Ultimately, it's about "staying 'equidistant' from other states". Historian Michel Grünewald points to a manifest contradiction in this position. Indeed, Maurras would have renounced any critical approach and realism because of an almost blind confidence in Pétain. The academic Frédéric Rouvillois believes that this is "an attitude that goes against the one he has always defended and practiced". This drift was already inscribed by Henri Massis, a disciple of Maurras, who wrote in La Morale de Kant in the University of France in 1917:

France alone is the leaven that animates the human mass in a human and divine sense; and this is why we have the duty to subordinate our opinion and... our thought, to the existence of France, minister of God.

— Stephen Wilson, La France et l'étranger. Aspects du nationalisme de l'Action française (traduction de Malvine Evenson), Revue d'histoire moderne et contemporaine, Vol. 20, n°3, 1973.

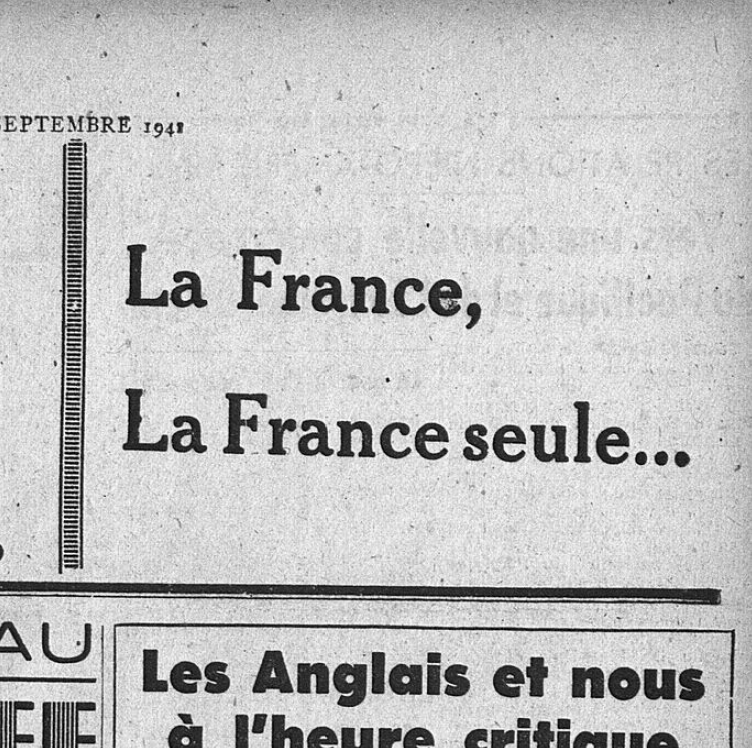
Ear of L'Action française added from August 26, 1940.

Maurras therefore had the newspaper L'Action française inscribed "The France, The France alone..." from August 26, 1940 until the end of the war. « The France alone » became the watchword of Action Française throughout the conflict.

We only have one motto : France. France alone or, if you prefer, France alone, such is the fundamental axiom.

— Charles Maurras, La seule France : chronique des jours d'épreuve, H. Lardanchet, 1941.

Isolated by "age and a stroke", Charles Maurras was condemned in 1945 for intellectual collaboration with Germany, partly because of this logic of neither nor.

== Posterity ==
Historian Jacques Julliard detects a Maurrassian influence in the sovereignism of Michel Onfray on the pretext of the defense of "France alone" against the European Union.

== Bibliography ==
- Olivier Dard, « « La France seule » », dans Charles Maurras, le maître et l'action, Paris, Armand Colin, coll. « Nouvelles biographies historiques », 2013, 352 p. (ISBN 978-2-200-24347-0, présentation en ligne), p. 210-217
- Grunewald, Michel (2019). De la "France d'abord" à la "France seule": l'Action française face au national-socialisme et au Troisième Reich (in French). Pierre-Guillaume de Roux. ISBN 978-2-36371-310-0.
- Rodolphe Lachat, « Les seules France », dans Axel Tisserand, Stéphane Giocanti, Maurras, Paris, L'Herne, 2011, 392 p. (ISBN 978-2-85197-163-0, lire en ligne), p. 363-369
- Bénédicte Vergez-Chaignon, « Charles Maurras et Vichy : les vicissitudes de la France seule », dans Axel Tisserand, Stéphane Giocanti, Maurras, Paris, L'Herne, 2011, 392 p. (ISBN 978-2-85197-163-0, lire en ligne), p. 338-345
- Roger Télib, Charles Maurras ou la seule France, Paris, La Restauration Nationale, 1986, 146 p.
