= Antisémitisme d'État =

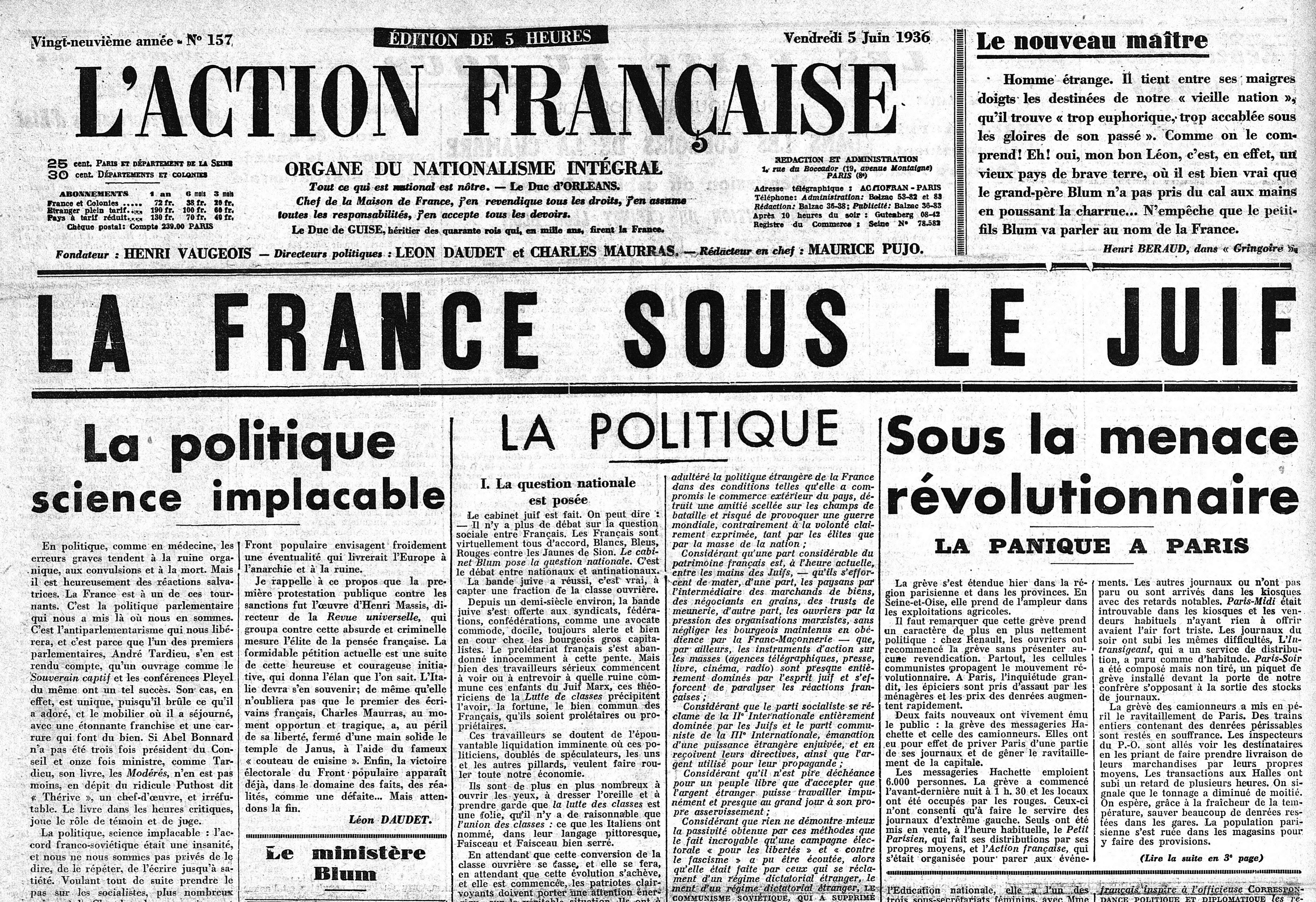
"France under the Jew", an antisemitic headline from L'Action française on June 5, 1936.

State antisemitism is a concept promoted by Charles Maurras, who claimed that this type of antisemitism was distinct from "racial antisemitism". Maurras defined it as a political rather than biological or religious antisemitism.

== The concept of "state within a state" ==
Charles Maurras inherited the notion of combating "states within a state" from thinkers like René de La Tour du Pin. He identified four "confederated states" within France—Jewish, Protestant, Freemason, and foreign—and sought to curtail their perceived influence.

For Maurras, the "Jewish problem" stemmed from what he saw as an inevitable conflict between Jewish and French interests. He argued that Jews, lacking a homeland in France, inherently maintained an allegiance to Palestine.

== The role of state antisemitism in Maurrassian thought ==
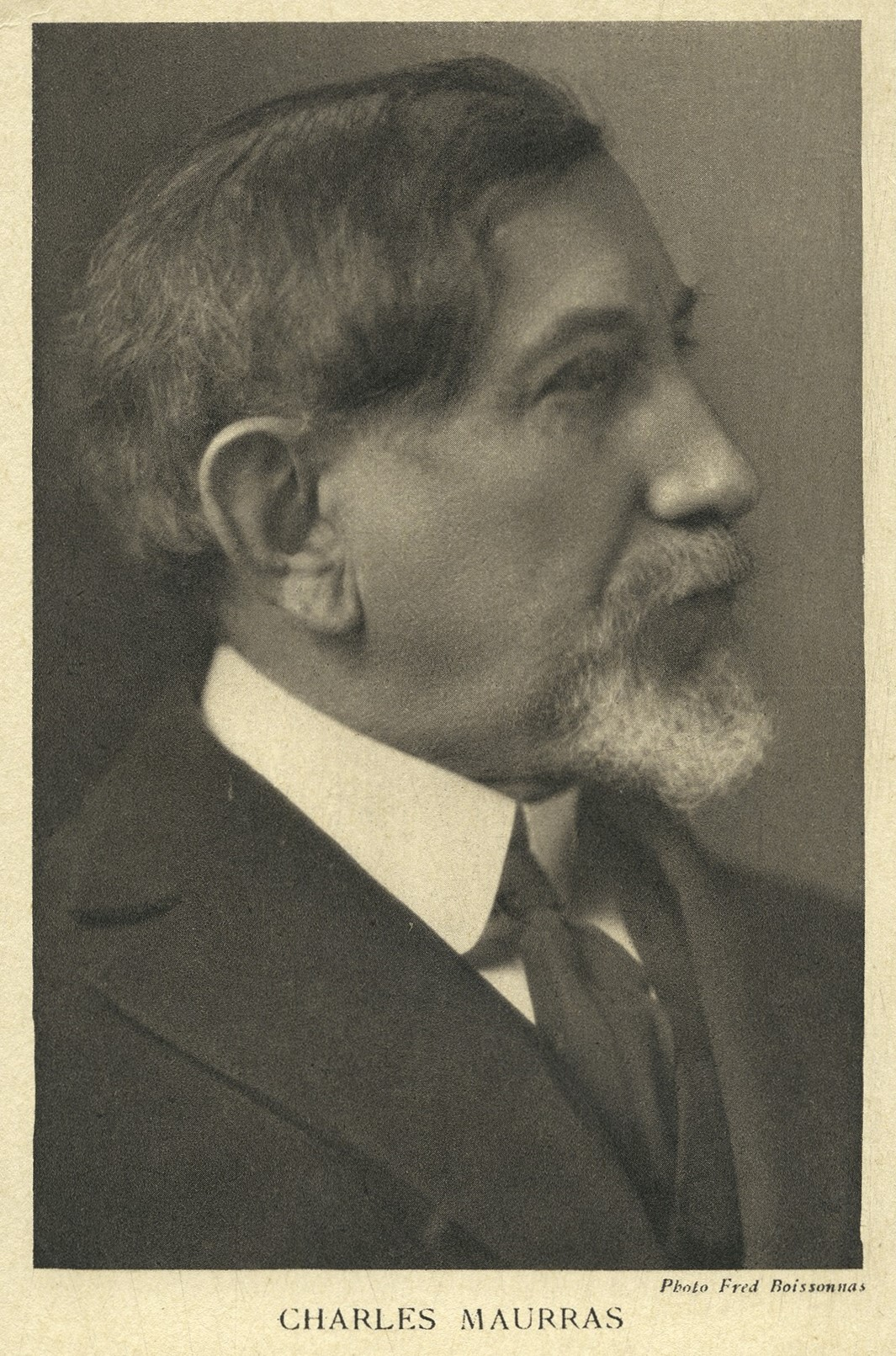
Charles Maurras in 1925.

While Maurras's state antisemitism is often considered a secondary element of his work, it played a significant role in Action Française ideology. Maurras distinguished "good Jews"—those who fought for France in World War I—from those he deemed harmful to national interests.

Maurras rejected racial antisemitism, viewing it as contrary to Catholic teachings and incompatible with French nationalism. He believed the state should limit Jewish influence in key sectors like public administration and education without persecuting them physically or religiously.

== Relationship to Nazi antisemitism ==
Maurras himself condemned biological antisemitism, denouncing it as "a moral evil". He criticized the Nazi focus on racial purity and argued for a distinction between political antisemitism and racist ideologies.

Following the Holocaust, Maurras continued to advocate for state antisemitism, albeit with modifications. He recognized the atrocities of the Nazi regime and argued that France should have protected its Jewish citizens.

== State antisemitism and French Jews ==
Despite his antisemitism, Maurras received support from certain Jewish members of Action française, including René Groos and Louis Latzarus. He distinguished between "well-born Jews"—those assimilated into French culture—and foreign Jews, whom he saw as problematic.

Maurras, though agnostic, admired Catholicism as a stabilizing force in society. His antisemitism did not advocate conversion or religious persecution but instead focused on limiting Jewish influence in secular domains.

== Intellectual context ==
The current approach in the field of intellectual history often privileges a scholarly perspective. However, historian Laurent Joly criticizes this methodology in his book Naissance de l'Action française, arguing that it focuses excessively on reading "printed and periodical sources" without proper context. Joly accuses some historians, including François Huguenin, of attempting to "neutralize the problem of antisemitism" in Maurras's thought.

Huguenin suggests that antisemitic discourse in France predated the founding of Action française and existed within nationalist and reactionary movements, as well as among socialists. He highlights earlier instances of antisemitism on both the political left and right, citing figures like Voltaire, Karl Marx (in On the Jewish Question), Jean Jaurès, and Georges Clemenceau. This view supports the argument that antisemitism was pervasive across the political spectrum in 19th-century France.

Historian Michel Dreyfus points to works like Alphonse Toussenel's Les Juifs, rois de l'époque (1845) as foundational in linking Jews to stereotypes of banking and capitalism. This antisemitism, Dreyfus notes, was equally present in socialist and anarchist thought.

== See also ==
- Antisemitism in France
  - Dreyfus affair
- Dual loyalty

== Bibliography ==
- Michel Dreyfus, L'antisémitisme à gauche. Histoire d'un paradoxe de 1830 à nos jours. Ed. La Découverte, 2011.
- Huguenin, François (2011), L'Action française, Perrin
- Giocanti, Stéphane (2006), Charles Maurras: Chaos and Order, Flammarion
- Joly, Laurent (2015), Naissance de l'Action française: Maurice Barrès, Charles Maurras et l'extrême droite nationaliste au tournant du XXe siècle, Paris: Grasset, ISBN 978-2-246-81160-2
- Michaël Bar Zvi, Philosophie de l'antisémitisme. PUF, 1985.
