= Lettres des Jeux olympiques =

1901 book by Charles Maurras

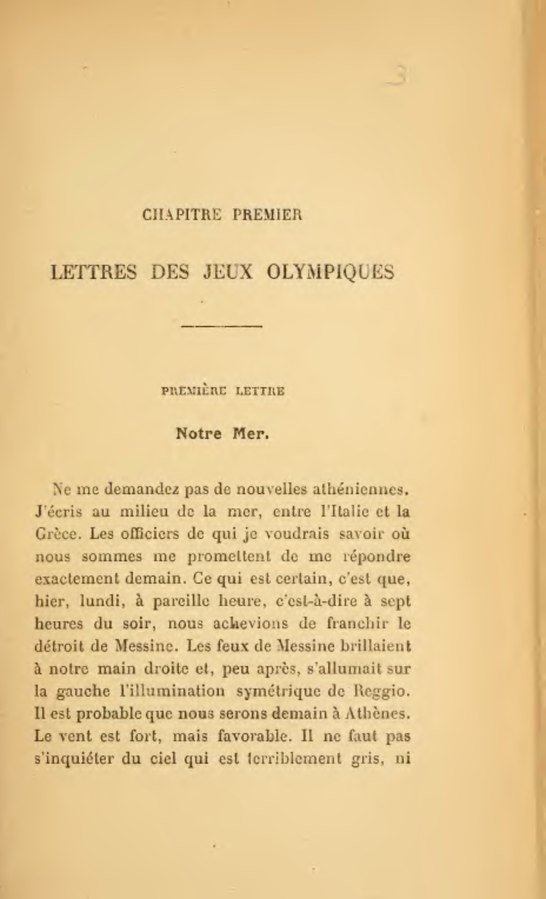
- Editor: Juven
- Author: Charles Maurras
- Language: French
- Genre: Politique
- Publication date: 1901
- Publication place: France

Lettres des Jeux olympiques (Letters from the Olympic Games) is a correspondence between the French journalist and politician Charles Maurras and Gustave Janicot, editor-in-chief of La Gazette de France written between April 8 and May 3, 1896. The letters are then collected on 1901 in the book Anthinéa.

== Presentation ==
=== Context ===
From April 6 to 15, 1896, the first modern Olympic Games took place in Athens, at the initiative of Pierre de Coubertin. From April 8 to May 3, 1896, La Gazette de France commissioned the young journalist Charles Maurras to cover the event. The letters were published in the newspaper from April 15 to 22, 1896.

=== Composition ===
The Lettres des Jeux olympiques contain six missives. The first is written from the Ionian Sea, the other five from Athens.

=== Analysis ===
After the Olympic Games had already started, Charles Maurras sent a first letter to Paris, written on the ship he boarded from Marseille. The letter, entitled “Our Sea”, is a tribute to the Mediterranean Sea, cradle of Greco-Roman civilization.

Fascinated by the azure blue of the Mediterranean, his heart beats faster as he approaches the epicenter of the classical world; the wind that blew around the boat could have no other name than Zephyr. Finally, the Peloponnese stood out on the horizon: “Dear friends of France, if you only knew how fraternal this is to us! » Thus ended this first letter dated April 15.

— Wolf Lepenies

As soon as he arrived at the Games, Charles Maurras put the success of the German athletes into perspective: "It was because they had no French competitors in front of them." Maurras is not so interested in sport, which he considers "too Anglo-Saxon for his taste". Maurras feared the Games would be hijacked into a "sporting cosmopolitanism" but his fears fade when he notices "the enthusiasm of the Greek people for the shepherd Spiridon Louïs, winner in the marathon event, as well as the good-natured and noisy patriotism of the Yankees".

== Consequences ==
Maurras returns deeply shaken by his trip to Greece, from which he draws several lessons reported in Anthinéa and Les Vergers de la mer. According to him, nothing surpasses “the harmony established in the arts by classical Greece (6th-4th century BC)” which would have been reproduced during the Grand Siècle in France. However, this harmony remains fragile due to "the state of decadence into which Greece has fallen", a product of democracy. Maurras extends this observation to France, which would have "continued to retreat on land and sea since the Old Regime was swept away and, with it, the balanced and sovereign foreign policy of the Capetians, which did not depend on this or that parliamentary majority to choose their allies and their wars. He concludes that neighboring monarchical regimes are doing much better, including Victorian England, the Austro-Hungarian Empire, the United Reich, Italy and Spain. Based on these examples, he comes away convinced that the monarchical regime makes the nations that adopt it stronger.

Charles Maurras published his letters in his work Anthinéa in 1901.

== Bibliography ==
- Besson, Patrick (2012). "Maurras aux JO". Au point: Journal d'un Français sous l'empire de la pensée unique (in French). Fayard. ISBN 978-2-213-66952-6.
- Baptiste Rappin (2017). "Heidegger et Maurras à Athènes". Nouvelle École (66): 63–68.
- Robert Jouanny (1974). "À propos du premier voyage de Maurras en Grèce". Études maurrassiennes. 3. Aix-en-Provence: 81–96.
- Axel Tisserand (September 2003). "Les Lettres des Jeux olympiques". Bulletin Charles Maurras (23). Niherne.

== Externals links ==
- Full text of Lettres des Jeux olympiques on maurras.net
