= Enquête sur la monarchie =

1900 book by Charles Maurras

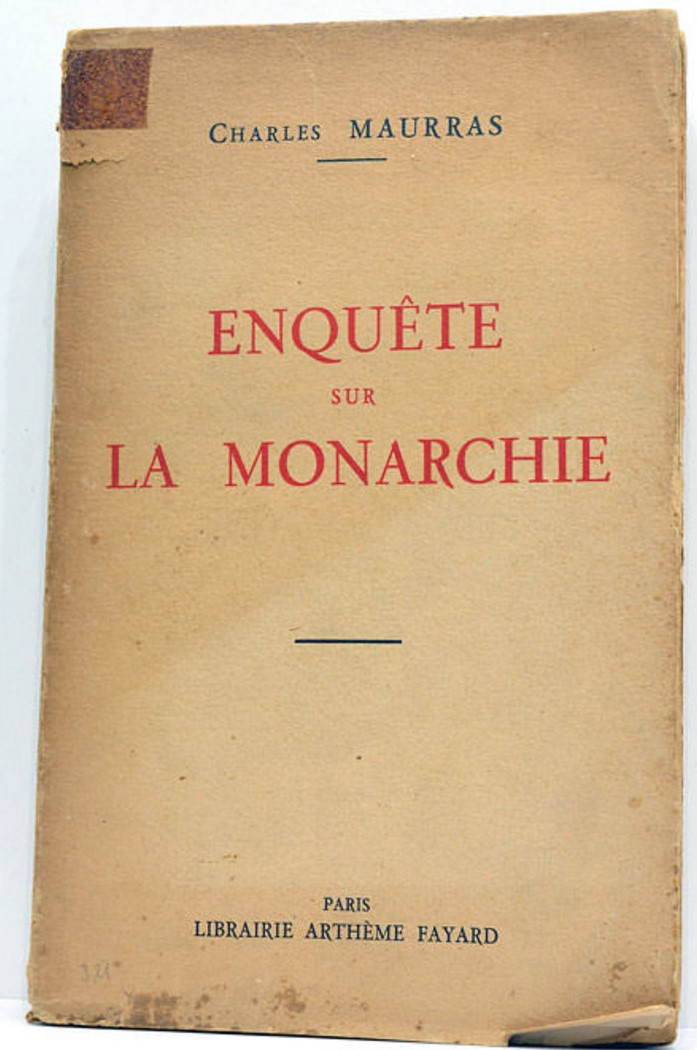
- Editor: Gazette de France
- Author: Charles Maurras
- Publication date: 1900
- Publication place: France

Enquête sur la monarchie (Inquiry into the Monarchy) is a book by the French politician Charles Maurras, journalist at the Revue d'Action française then director of L'Action française, first published in 1900 in the Gazette de France. Enquête sur la monarchie is the starting point for a renewal of the royalist movement in France. A revival based on the development of a new doctrine "which replaces the old parliamentary and conservative royalism with a conception of monarchy that aims to be traditional and nationalist", and the symmetrical development of the Action française born in 1899.

== Presentation ==
=== Composition ===
The first two editions were published in the Gazette de France in 1900.

The first book, entitled "Chez nos exilés", relates the interviews conducted by Maurras with André Buffet, head of the political office of the Duke of Orléans and Count Eugène de Lur-Saluces, president of the royalist committees of the South-West.

The second book, entitled "Les réponses", compiles the letters received from well-known and unknown personalities following the publication of the previous book, to which Charles Maurras responds.

The third book titled "Jules Lemaître et son ami", dated 1903, brings together 7 articles written by the eponymous French playwright and critic. These texts are followed in the appendix by a rallying letter from Octave Tauxier and an unpublished manuscript "Dictateur et roi". This journalistic work was brought together in a single volume in 1909. In 1925, the new edition included a "Discours préliminaire" which clarified certain elements.

Guillaume Bacot, former director of the French Review of the History of Political Ideas, sees in it a "rather disparate, not to say frankly disordered" set but still discerns a guideline: the restoration of the monarchy.

=== The design of the monarchy ===
==== An unparliamentary and temperate monarchy ====
Maurras promotes an anti-parliamentary monarchy contrary to the two previous experiments which are the Bourbon Restauration from 1814 to 1830 and the July monarchy from 1830 to 1848. For Maurras, there must necessarily be "a king who reigns and governs" freed from the "anarchic yoke of deputies" breaking with the parliamentary monarchy where the king is confined to symbolic functions. This monarchy would be tempered by "councils and representative assemblies called even to consent to new laws and taxes." Maurras relies on the examples of cardinal Richelieu, Henri IV and Louis XIII and denounces the deviation initiated under Louis XIV and the absolutism.

==== A scientific monarchy ====
For Maurras, the new monarchical conception is supposed to be based on a "scientific monarchy" whose legitimacy does not rest on "mysticisms" from the divine right or the social contract.

To others, [...] the old divine right, solemn foolishness of the unintelligent courtiers of the past!

— Charles Maurras, Le Soleil, July 1, 1900

The Enquête sur la monarchie intends to demonstrate by scientific reasoning the necessity of monarchy in the manner of the positivists. Charles Maurras invokes experience and "the mathematical authority of reason" to come to the conclusion that the monarchy is the only regime that can meet the needs of France and the nationalists.

The necessity of Monarchy is demonstrated as a theorem. The desire to preserve our French homeland once posed as a postulate, everything is linked, everything is deduced from an ineluctable movement.

— Charles Maurras, Enquête sur la monarchie, 1900

Far from idealism, Maurras claims to deal with the monarchy as it was and not to rely on a biased view of past centuries.

==== A hereditary monarchy ====
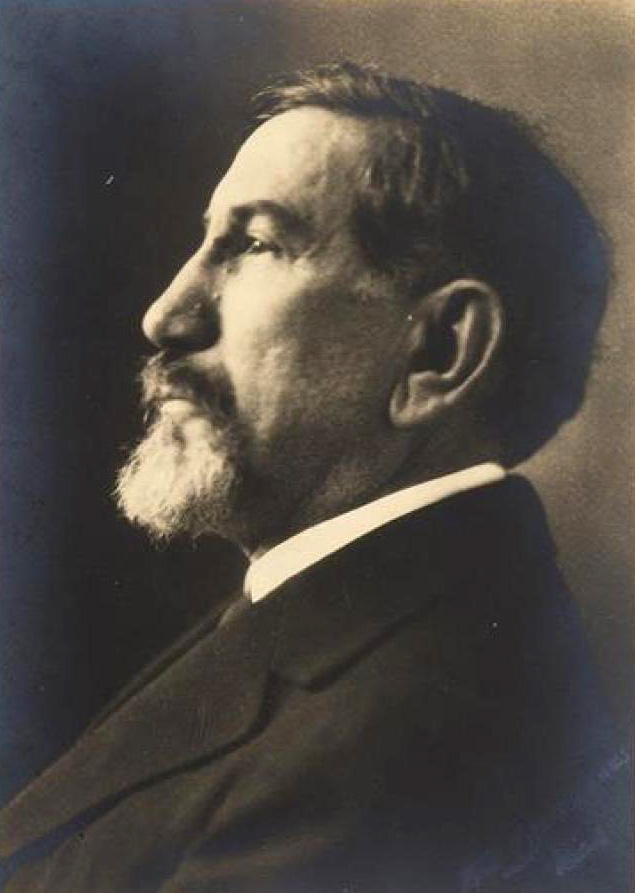
Charles Maurras (1868-1952).

For Maurras, heredity is the keystone of the monarchy. According to him, "monarchical institutions always ensure the best possible government, whatever the virtues of the heir to the throne." Independently of the qualities of the kings, who "were not more often than not exceptional men", heredity would dispose the sovereign to fortify the nation. It would therefore be the monarchical heredity itself which would guarantee the good government of the country because France would become the patrimony of a family whose king will always have "a fundamental interest in governing well". Heredity would allow a fusion of "the identity of the interests of a national dynasty with the very interests of the nation". By atavism, the king, custodian of this heritage, would thus have every interest in preserving it and making it bear fruit for his successors.

A hereditary ruler is too directly interested in the public good to rule solely according to his mood or according to a system [...]. Its deep nature, its necessary and natural function or, if you prefer to use the language of geometricians, its position oblige it to adjust itself to the necessities of public safety.

— André Buffet, quote from Enquête sur la monarchie

Heredity also predisposes Dauphins to the exercise of the "king's profession" by the education received from an early age. Moreover, heredity would also free from the political instability caused by the party system.

Heredity still frees electoral constraints and the whims of public opinion, allowing in particular this decentralization that the need to control the elections absolutely prevents the Republic from realizing...

— Guillaume Bacot

==== A decentralized monarchy ====
In the Enquête sur la monarchie, André Buffet and the Duke of Orléans are convinced that the decline of the Monarchy dates back to Louis XIV when he broke with the decentralization to which the two men attribute the longevity and success of the monarchical regime. The Duke of Orléans therefore promises decentralized institutions and to attach himself to sovereign functions and therefore to the "higher affairs of the nation".

The king would govern by councils relying on the representative assemblies which would have a role of information, grievances and control. Charles Maurras does not detail the system but enjoins reading the corporatist writings of René de La Tour du Pin on the same subject.

=== The three types of bad king ===
The Enquête sur la monarchie considers three problematic hypotheses: "that of an incapable king, that of a fallible king and that of a malevolent king".

If the king is incapable or mad, Maurras brushes aside this hypothesis by proposing the institution of a regency as is customary for minor kings. However, Maurras does not inquire "whether these regents will be as accountable to the public good as hereditary monarchs".

If the king is fallible, in other words that he can make mistakes, Maurras recognizes that a monarch is not exempt from making mistakes. However, in his position as dynastic ruler, the king would be "more interested than anyone in avoiding error or, if he makes it, in sensing it, and, when he has sensed it, in correcting it". In addition, the king could compensate for his shortcomings by surrounding himself with competent servants of the state. In the event that the king was still wrong with bad advisers, the king would remain "always anxious to detect the faults committed and to repair the resulting damage as quickly as possible" while in democracy "vigilant concern for the public interest is cruelly dispersed in democracy."

Finally, if the king is malevolent i.e. "only concerned with his immediate enjoyments and pleasures", Maurras relativizes the nuisances caused by the sovereign. Despite his mistresses and his setbacks, the king continued to embody the unity and continuity of the state, in addition to being held back by the fear of losing his throne.

It is easy to realize that a bad king, conscious, responsible and nominative, trembling at least for his days if he does not tremble for the future of his dynasty, finds himself, by force of circumstance, infinitely more limited. In its whims only a collective and unconscious power, where the responsibilities, always divided, are very easily scattered over a very large number of heads.

— Charles Maurras, Enquête sur la monarchie

Thus, however disastrous the rule of a malevolent king might be, it would be less disastrous than "the parliamentary or dictatorial whims of national sovereignty". Maurras points to this as proof that even under the reign of Louis XV from 1715 to 1774, France did not experience "disasters comparable to the three invasions of 1814, 1815 and 1870". This reasoning will be further reinforced by the two other Germanic invasions during the two world wars in 1914 and 1940.

== Critics ==
Ultimately, Maurras concludes that "the restoration of monarchical institutions alone [...] is supposed to be sufficient to guarantee the best government." The analysis drawn up by Guillaume Bacot criticizes Maurras for not conceiving the restoration of the monarchy solely on this basis.

== Around the book ==
Jean-Paul Sartre, aged twenty, read the Enquête sur la monarchie by borrowing a copy from the Library of Letters of the École Normale Supérieure.

== Bibliography ==
- Bacot, Guillaume (2021). "L'Enquête sur la monarchie, miroir sans tain. Du reflet idéal à la réalité positive". Revue Française d'Histoire des Idées Politiques (53): 187–198. doi:10.3917/rfhip1.053.0187. ISSN 1266-7862. S2CID 236601606.
- Stéphane Giocanti (dir.), chap. 4 « L'Enquête sur la monarchie », dans Charles Maurras : le chaos et l'ordre, Paris, Flammarion, 2006, 575 p. (ISBN 978-2-08-122110-9, lire en ligne), p. 185-195
