= Kiel et Tanger =

1910 book by Charles Maurras

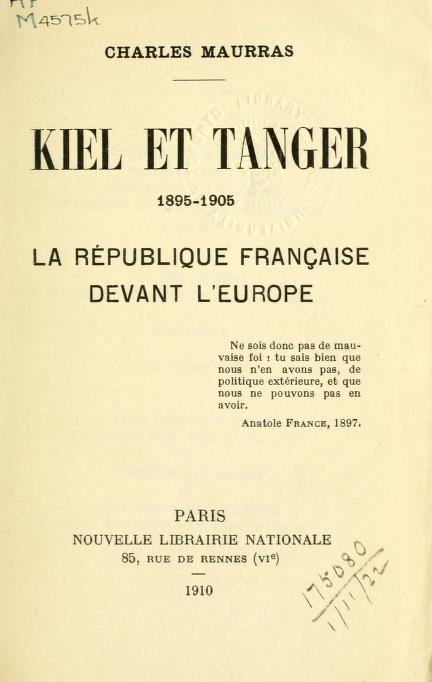
- Editor: Nouvelle Librairie nationale
- Author: Charles Maurras
- Publication date: 1910
- Publication place: France

Kiel et Tanger (Kiel and Tanger) is a book written by the French journalist and politician Charles Maurras, director of L'Action française. This essay, written in 1905 and completed until its first publication in 1910, describes the military weaknesses of France linked to "the inertia of the republican system". The book is based on articles by Charles Maurras published in the Gazette de France and L'Action française. The book was reissued in 1913 and 1921, then in 2018.

== Presentation ==
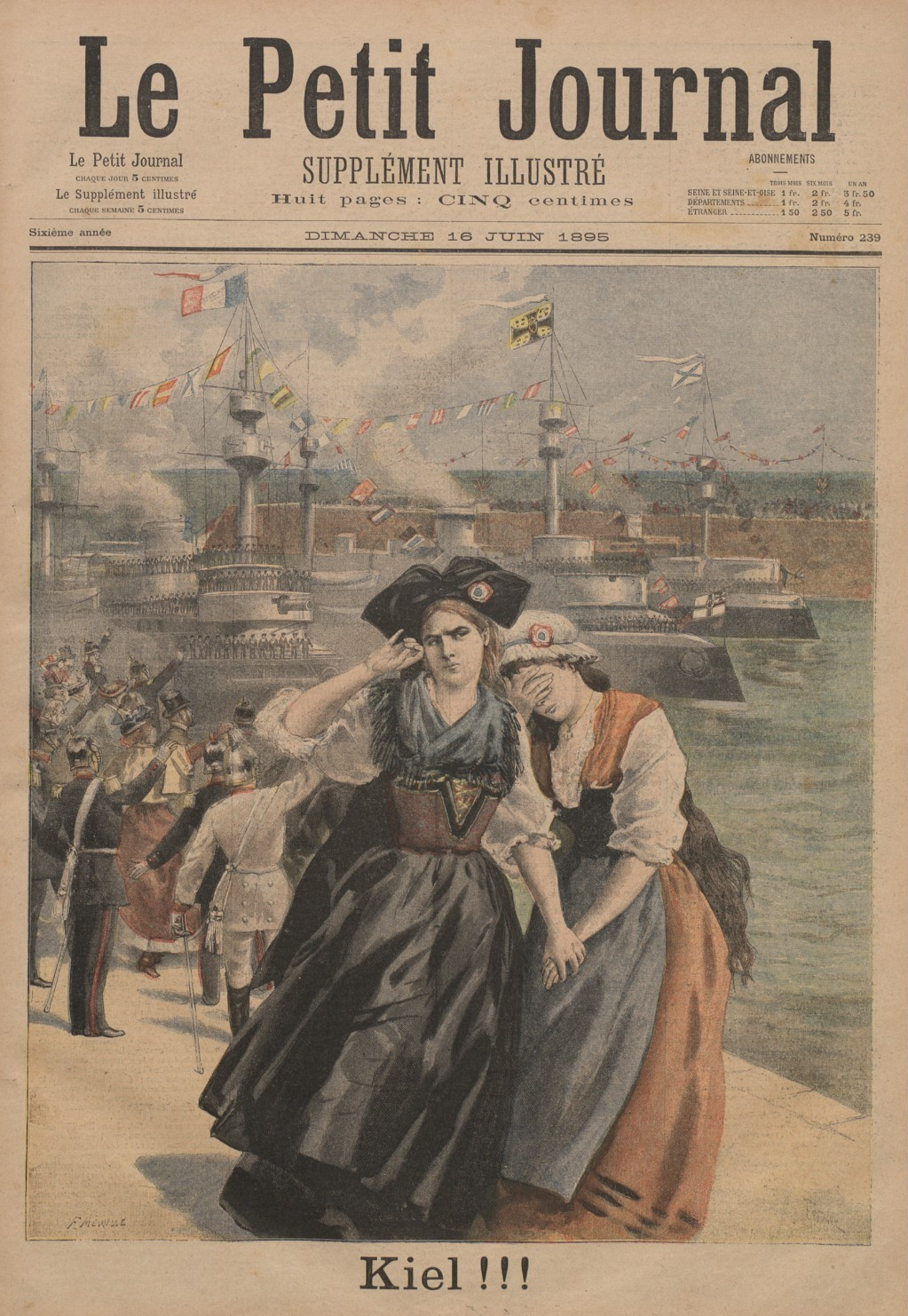
The French military navy in the direction of Kiel in Le Petit Journal of June 18, 1895.

The title of the work draws its origin from two events: the naval review of Kiel on June 18, 1895 where the French military navy takes part alongside German and Russian ships in an anti-British demonstration and the first Moroccan Crisis of March 31, 1905, triggered by the German Emperor Wilhelm II opposing the creation of a French protectorate over Morocco. The French government of the time is destabilized and put at odds on the diplomatic scene.

Kiel and Tanger is a critique of French foreign policy between 1895 and 1905, a period during which the ministry of foreign affairs explores two paths: "the alliance with Germany against an England which thwarted the colonial ambitions of Paris, then the alliance with England against a Germany to which French opinion had not forgiven the annexation of Paris. Alsace-Lorraine".

The integral nationalism of Maurras is nourished by the spirit of revenge against Germany to the point of establishing "a systematic anti-Germanist doctrine, capable of rallying an ideologically consenting military society". However, Maurras' integral nationalism must be understood strictly as defensive nationalism because "Action française was not a warmonger, since the fear that a war would lead to the disappearance of France, if it was still ruled by a republic, was the basis of its existence." Opposite, the German Empire deployed "permanent secret means, both police and military, against France before 1914".

Faced with the accentuation of Franco-Germanic tensions, cuts in military budgets since 1890 and the unpreparedness of France, Maurras predicts 500,000 deaths during the next conflict: “At the very least, in concrete terms, the weakness of the regime must represent to us 500,000 young French people lying cold and bloody, on their poorly defended land”. The human toll of the Great War is ultimately heavier with 1,400,000 French losses.

Maurras concludes that "the Republic is by nature incapable of coherence, because the State is delivered there as food to factions too busy with 'the little civil war, that is to say the electoral and parliamentary game'".

Several times in the book, Charles Maurras likes to quote Marcel Sembat, "the socialist who predicted, according to Maurras, the fortunes of monarchism if the Republic did not succeed in imposing itself".

== Reception ==
Maurras' work met with great success at the outset. Albert Thibaudet, literary critic of the interwar period, summarizes Kiel and Tanger as "an attempt to demonstrate that foreign policy is forbidden to a republican state and that the wisest thing for it will be not to do it at all." From August to November 1910, L'Action française published "almost daily, in its section on the life of the league, extracts from the various reports of the Parisian and provincial press" about the book.

== Posterity ==
Kiel and Tanger is a work hailed for its quality of anticipation of international relations. In 1972, during a lecture given at the Institute of Political Studies in Paris, Georges Pompidou quotes a passage from Kiel and Tanger:

The world will therefore have the chance to represent itself for a long time... as a compound of two systems: several empires, with a number of nationalities, small or medium, in between. The world thus formed will not be the most peaceful. The weak will be too weak there, the powerful too powerful and the peace of one and the other will only rest on the terror that the colossi will have been able to inspire reciprocally. Mutual fear society, alternating bullying company, organized cannibalism !

He adds "someone who has never been my mentor, far from it, Charles Maurras has, in Kiel and Tanger, from 1910, foreseen the current world".

Éric Zemmour stated that he discovered Maurras very late in his life, only when he was 40-years-old, and that Kiel et Tanger was the first, and for a long time, only, work of Maurras he read, before discovering much later Devant l'Allemagne éternelle.

== Bibliography ==
- Georges-Henri Soutou (2010). Entre la vieille Europe et la seule France. Economica. ISBN 978-2-7178-5790-0.
- Martin Motte (2017). "Kiel et Tanger ou la géopolitique maurrassienne". Nouvelle École (66): 77–86.
- Martin Motte, « Maurras géopoliticien ? », dans Axel Tisserand, Stéphane Giocanti, Maurras, Paris, L'Herne, 2011, 392 p. (ISBN 978-2-85197-163-0, lire en ligne), p. 246-252

== Links ==
- Kiel et Tanger on Gallica, the BnF digital library.
