= Devant l'Allemagne éternelle =

1937 book by Charles Maurras

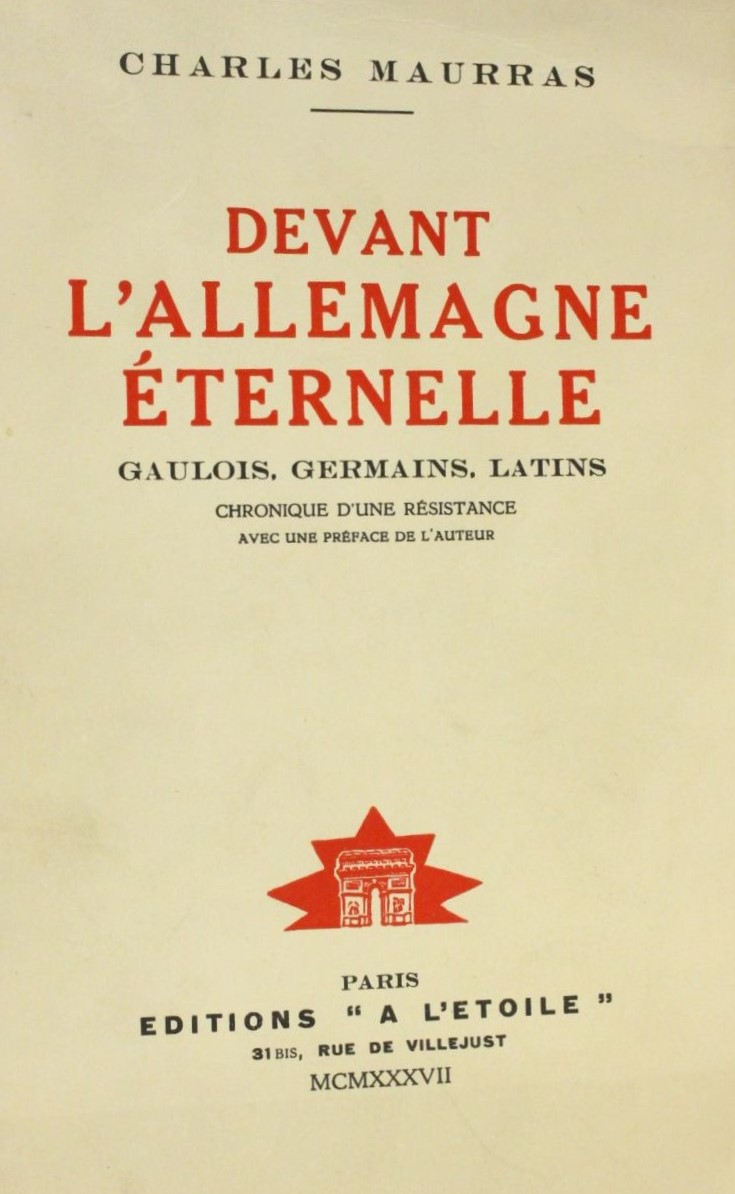
- Editor: À l'Etoile
- Author: Charles Maurras
- Publication date: 1937
- Publication place: France

Devant l'Allemagne éternelle (In front of eternal Germany) is a book by the French journalist and politician Charles Maurras, director of L'Action française published in 1937. The work was composed during the author's period of detention in La Santé prison from October 20, 1936, to July 6, 1937, for death threats against Léon Blum. He compiles "texts written for forty years on Germany, pan-Germanism and German influence in France".

== Presentation ==
=== Anti-germanism ===
Devant l'Allemagne éternelle is a deeply germanophobic text. Charles Maurras's Germanophobia is essentialist on the grounds that "the cultural characteristics of Germans are innate, they have been perpetuated for centuries". He attacks the "evil of eternal Germany, that which was peculiar to all the German peoples, at all periods of their history, this "shady and heavy race, of personal and jealous spirit, fills the Middle Age of struggles against the most august expression of Christian unity", this "brute force", this "innate savagery" which comes from "the instincts of German flesh and blood". He adheres to the idea of a "national and native character [...] inscribed in all of us".

Nevertheless, he qualifies his Germanophobia with a critique of "too biologizing" approaches as exhibited by Arthur de Gobineau. Faced with these theories, Maurras intends to want to "destroy the prejudice which consists in explaining" all the historico-political facts by the soul and the genius of the races "". For the historian Stéphane Giocanti, it is imperative to relate Devant l'Allemagne éternelle with the articles of the newspaper which combine both state anti-Semitism and a criticism of "racial antisemites" with scientific and populist claims.

Yes, there are many races! Certainly each has its own soul, its genius, but race is not everything, there are many other factors, and the constitution of human nature, its essential traits and its outlines, are perhaps not the most insignificant of these neglected factors. It is a marvel, indeed, to see man, of whatever type, once placed in a certain situation, react uniformly, whatever be the time, the place, the color of the skin and achieve with perfect constancy much the same type of social constitution! In the past, European feudalism was believed to be a unique fact, as it is moreover an original fact, in history. But not at all. The principal airs of feudal life have been found in ancient Greece, in modern India, in Japan.

— Charles Maurras, Devant l'Allemagne éternelle

The categorical denunciation of the Germans serves a precise and coherent purpose in relation to his way of envisaging civilization.

For Maurras, civilization embodies the "concretization of the principle of order" while Germany would be the example of "radical disorder". The two countries would therefore be radically opposed and France would be the only "authentic and legitimate depositary of the values of the civilization of which Athens was the founder". The history of the Germans is summed up as "a long anarchy, indeterminate [...] and interminable anarchy" while the "Western Franks" were "founders and organizers". Due to their supposedly 'anarchist' temperament, the Germans were reportedly unable to 'autonomously endow themselves with a 'rule' based on reason and when they achieve sovereignty they only follow the path of '[ their] fancy or [of their] interest"". From then on, it becomes legitimate for Maurras "to consider them as inferior to the French who, themselves, allowed the only real culture, classicism, to develop". Armed with these considerations, Maurras strives to demonstrate from Luther to Fichte, via Kant, Germany has distinguished itself by "the triumph of individualism opposed to the founding principle of all civilization, adherence to a universal system of values transcending any particular aim". In short, Germany remains "eternally enemy of the classical order of which France is the heir, and of which Nazism would therefore only be the ultimate, paroxysmal and caricatural form".

The book also focuses on the debates around Fustel de Coulanges and the nationalism of Fichte.

During World War II, Maurras does not change his opinions about Germany, especially "with officials who would like to see him contradict himself about his book Devant l'Allemagne éternelle".

In 1941, at the meal offered by Mr. Goirand, someone came to tell him that, perhaps, he would be tempted to change something in his book Before Germany Eternal. He replied, "well, you'll see, give me this book" and at the bottom of the dedication he had made to his host long before, he added: "Without it being necessary for me to strike out from this volume the least of the words which it contains".

— Bruno Goyet, Charles Maurras

=== Imminence of a new war ===
Faced with the rise of Hitler and the accentuation of international tensions, Charles Maurras launched a paradoxical call for resistance:

France no longer wants war, noted Maurras, and yet it must run to arms. Defeated, she would suffer a fate worthy of ancient times, when the victor had control over everything and everyone.

— Philippe Burrin, La France à l'heure allemande (1940-1944)

According to the historian Philippe Burin, this call would have had more weight "if Maurras did not support, at the same time, a policy of conciliation justified by the dilapidation in which democracy had placed the country". Indeed, Maurras no longer conceived the national security on the condition of a general reform of the regime. An altogether ambiguous position because Maurras found himself denouncing the same enemies as Nazism, in particular the Communists, the Jews and the foreigners.

It is therefore vital for Maurras to overthrow the Republic in order to protect France from pan-Germanism. In accordance with the requirements of Jacques Bainville in dans Conséquences politiques de la paix, Maurras argues that the German Empire must be dismembered. "This weakness which would have civilized Germany" is a bedrock of Maurrassism. Maurras is convinced that after this: "The Germans then become good people again".

== Bibliography ==
- Stéphane Giocanti (dir.), chap. 6 « Devant l'Allemagne éternelle », dans Charles Maurras : le chaos et l'ordre, Paris, Flammarion, 2006, 575 p. (ISBN 978-2-08-122110-9, lire en ligne), p. 351–414
- Michel Grunewald (dir.), « De Luther à Hitler. Maurras et l'« Allemagne éternelle » », dans Olivier Dard, L'Action française : culture, société, politique, vol. 2 : Charles Maurras et l'étranger – L'étranger et Charles Maurras, Villeneuve-d'Ascq, Peter Lang, 2009, 427 p. (ISBN 978-3-0343-0039-1, présentation en ligne), p. 339-358
