= Si le coup de force est possible =

1910 book by Charles Maurras

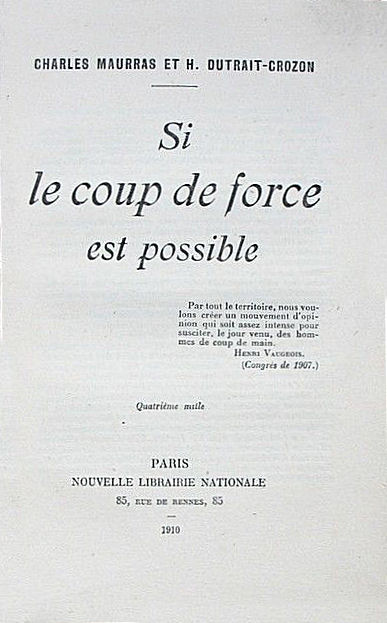
- Editor: Nouvelle Librairie nationale
- Author: Charles Maurras
- Publication date: 1910
- Publication place: France

Si le coup de force est possible (If the coup is possible) is a pamphlet by French journalist and politician Charles Maurras, director of L'Action française, and Henri Dutrait-Crozon, a pseudonym borrowed by two officers and polytechnicians: Georges Larpent and Frédéric Delebecque. Published in 1910, this booklet is a collection of articles published in the Revue d'Action française between January and March 1908. The authors review "the different possible scenarios of a return to the monarchy in France".

== Presentation ==
In the aftermath of the French Revolution and the Napoleonic Empire, Charles Maurras confided that he was wary of theories and preferred to refer to organizing empiricism. It is therefore from experience that he sets out the different types of coup de force.

The book is dedicated to the authors of Comment nous ferons la révolution sociale Émile Pataud and Émile Pouget, two revolutionary trade unionists with whom the Action française attempted a rapprochement before the World War I. Both men promoted the use of sabotage and direct action in their revolutionary prose.

The introduction lays the groundwork for the conception of the Maurrassian coup de force:

Anyone who reads L'Action française constantly encounters two ideas that can only be found there. It is necessary, she says, to build up a royalist state of mind. And as soon as this public spirit is formed, a coup de force will be struck to establish the monarchy.

The authors of the booklet rely on the failure of the Ligue de la patrie française of General Boulanger and in particular of "the electoral impasse in which it had been misled" to propose an "open-air conspiracy".

== The coup tactic ==
Historian Martin Motte notices in the Maurrassian coup de force tactic an analogical reduction similar to that developed by Frédéric Mistral in his Écrits politiques of 1869 :

Hope and aspire. Isn't the aspiration worth the conspiracy?

—

In 1907, Action française identified itself as follows:

What we are is a conspiracy. We conspire to determine a state of mind. This state of mind, we intend it essentially to suggest, to arouse, to support […] a coup […] directed against the regime which is killing France.

—

For Maurras and Henri Dutrait-Crozon, it is a question of establishing the intellectual and moral conditions favorable to the overthrow of the Republic and to bring about a "revolution operated from above". This strategy is modeled on the 1851 French coup d'État "prepared by decades of Napoleonic legend", despite Maurras's aversion for the bonapartism. In their book, the authors set out two types of conceivable acts of force.

Historian Olivier Dard analyzes the brochure as follows: "While the reasons for the fight and the stages of the process are identified, nothing specific is said about the organization and the methods: this breviary of the militants is not the equivalent nationalist of the What Is to Be Done? of Lenin."

=== The examples of Monk and Talleyrand ===
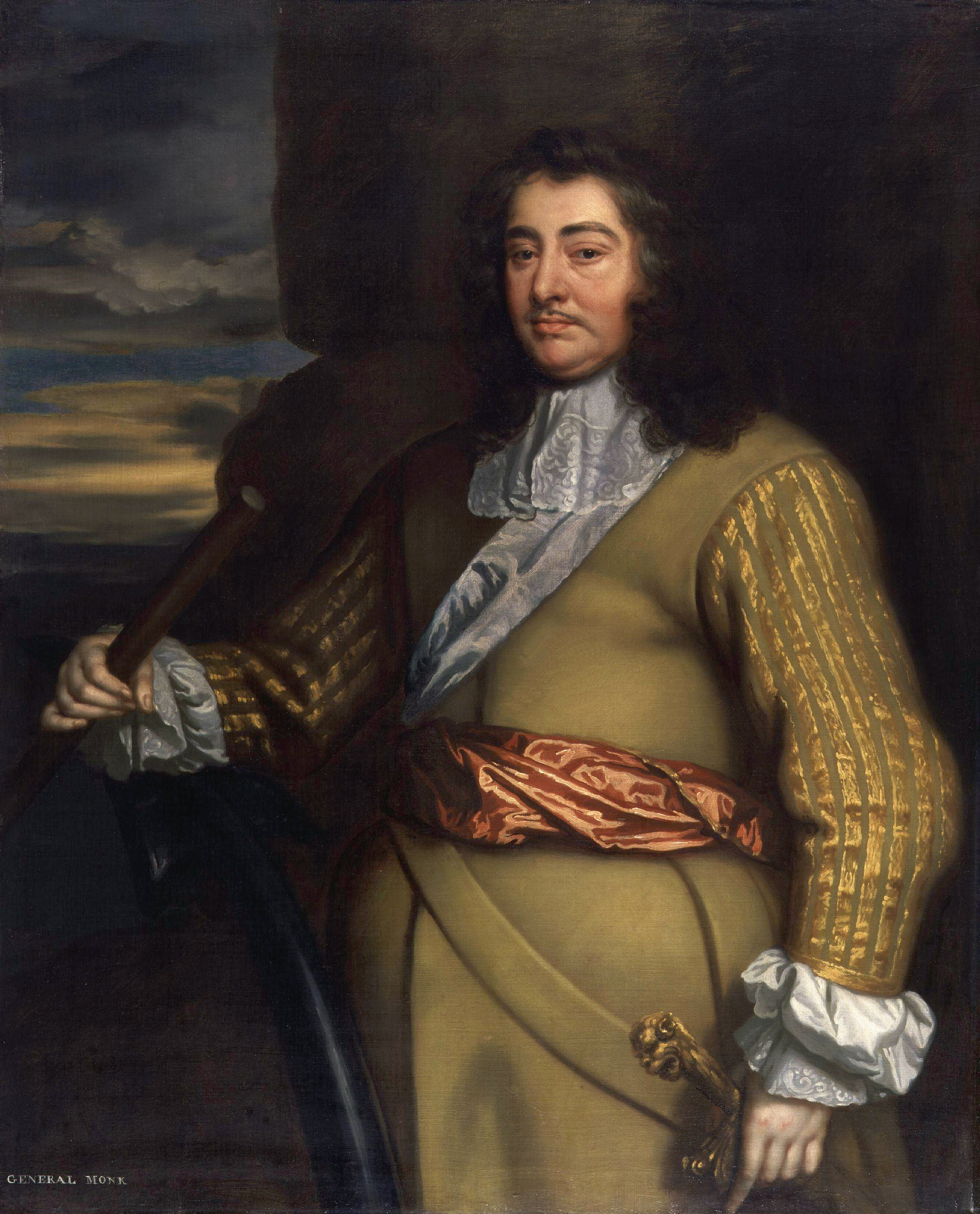
George Monck (1608-1670)

The authors refer to general Monck who restored Charles II in 1660 and to Talleyrand who placed Louis XVIII on the throne of France in 1814. May 1, 1660, after the death of the Lord Protector Olivier Cromwell, General Monck achieves the feat of restoring King Charles II to the English throne without shedding a single drop of blood. Maurras already invoked this reference in his Mademoiselle Monk published in 1902. Talleyrand is held up as a model of the "gloved revolution", by allowing through a subtle game of negotiations with the Tsar and the King of Prussia, the Restoration of the Bourbons as a pledge of peace in Europe against a Napoleon going to war.

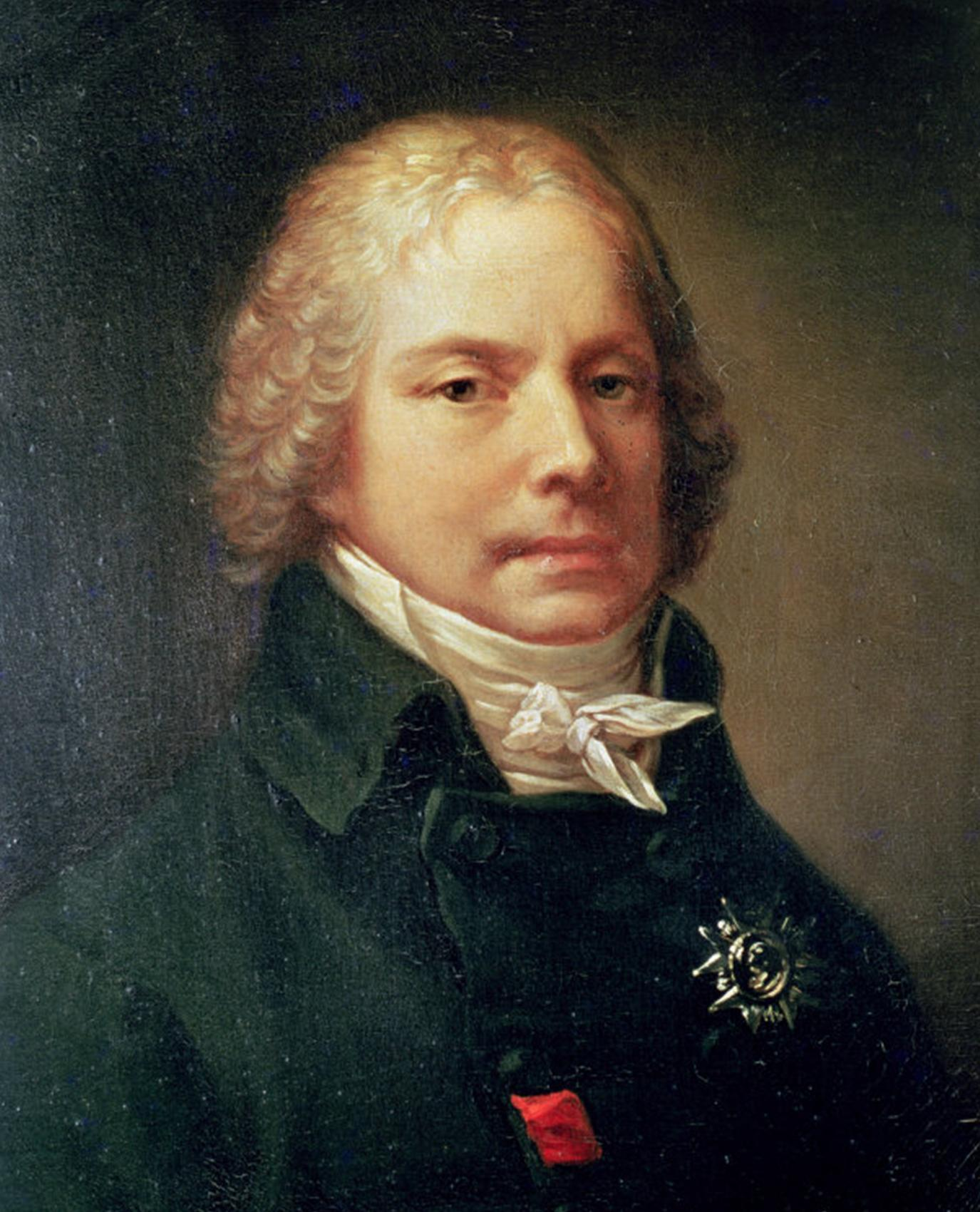
Talleyrand (1754-1838)

Maurras had previously studied the Bourbon Restauration through the Mémoires of Aimée de Coigny in an edition compiled by Étienne Lamy. This study led to the publication of Mademoiselle Monk ou la génération des événements in 1905. However, if Maurras relies on the Restoration of 1814, "the monarchy restored to the benefit of Louis XVIII […] differs too much from that which he aspires to establish in France" because Maurras is opposed to the parliamentary monarchy.

For Maurras, these two patterns of moves presuppose "maximum covert action" led by a dignitary who would ensure a monarchical transition. This dignitary, this key man in the coup, is nicknamed "Monk" in honor of the general Monck.

=== The "opportunity" coup d'Etat ===
For Charles Maurras and Henri Dutrait-Crozon, the "opportunity" coup is based on the exploitation of a military mutiny, a popular riot or a conspiracy. These opportunities "which show up from time to time" must enable an organized group of men to overthrow the Republic. The authors nevertheless advance two additional conditions for the realization of this coup. First, that of convincing as many French people as possible "to the Royal Cause through effective propaganda" in order to give the "desirable impetus" and consequently to shape "a movement of opinion which is intense enough to arouse, when the day comes, men of help." The second condition is to believe yourself in the plausibility of this coup de force:

Either one believes in this “Coup”, where one believes in nothing, and one hopes for nothing, and France is lost.

—

Maurras therefore relies on painstaking propaganda work to convert the population and particularly the civilian and military elites. This coup would rely on "brains, hearts and arms" i.e. trained men of action. For the historian Martin Motte, "this way of posing the relationship between culture and politics heralds Gramsci."

== Around the book ==
On December 20, 1926, the Pope Pie XI ordered Catholics to break with Action Française and published the decree of the Congregation of the Index of January 29, 1914, which condemned seven works by Maurras, including Si le coup de force est possible.

During the trial that led to the administrative case law dissolving the Action française League in 1936, the government commissioner Andrieux supported his argument by quoting the brochure Si le coup de force est possible.

== Bibliography ==
- Georgin, Éric (2015). "Entre volonté et renoncement : la Restauration jugée par Charles Maurras". Napoleonica. La Revue: 52-69.
- Jean-Christophe Buisson (2020). "Charles Maurras ou la contre-révolution permanente". Les grandes figures de la droite. De la Révolution française à nos jours. Paris: Perrin. p. 237-255.
