= L'Avenir de l'intelligence =

1905 essay by Charles Maurras

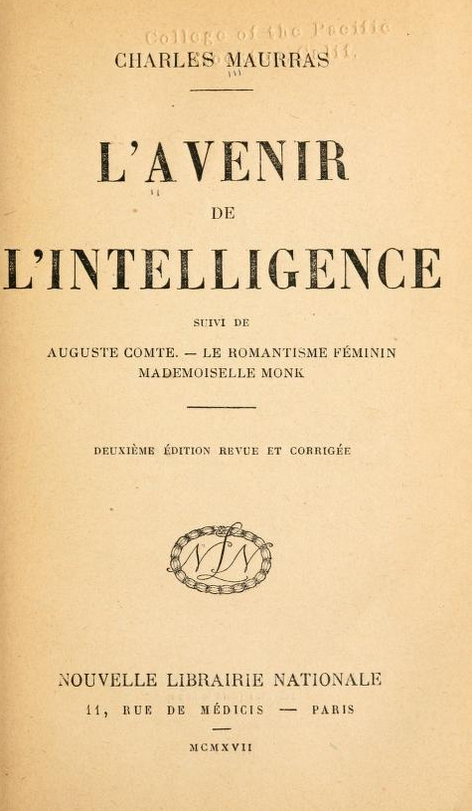
- Editor: Albert Fontemoing
- Author: Charles Maurras
- Publication date: 1905
- Publication place: France

L'Avenir de l'intelligence (The Future of the Intelligentsia) is a philosophical and political essay by the French journalist and politician Charles Maurras, director of L'Action française, published in 1905. This text was published in 1902 in the review Minerva led by journalist René-Marc Ferry. Charles Maurras offers a critique "of the evolution of the status of Intelligence in contact with modernity, of its progressive submission to Gold".

== Presentation ==
=== Critique of plutocracy ===
In this text, Maurras develops "all the intransigence of his intellectualism" for André Lagarde and Laurent Michard. Charles Maurras denounces "the historical destitution of the artistic elites, passing from an enlightened prince's patronage to the purely interested and speculative power, more vulgar and tinged with "cosmopolitanism", of the rich owners of the press organs, thus denouncing a de facto monopoly of the "Gold" on Thought and Aesthetics". The essay is imbued with "a social anti-capitalism that would be equally well received and applauded by intellectual and political figures on the right as well as on the left and far left" like Édouard Berth, disciple of Georges Sorel. Julien Cohen detects in it the expression of a "Maurrassian anti-capitalism" which is defined by the denunciation of "the corruption of national civil society but it is above all a refusal of cosmopolitanism, that is to say of immigration of mass implied by the new market society". According to Pierre Boutang, this text was composed during the period when Maurras paid "most attention to economic reality".

Those who hold the only real power in a world where grace has disappeared, where the Sacred has been methodically denied. This plutocratic power, this economic power is certainly not uniquely Jewish; they are not even Jews at all if we consider them in their origin and development; the Jewish fact, the Jewish idiosyncrasy appear in the zone of exchange and mutations of the constituent forces of the new power, in their financial expression; they reveal themselves even better in the global, unitary conception of these forces, under the name of political economy.

— Pierre Boutang,

Boutang notes a similarity of analysis between Marx and Maurras who agree that "the physics of forces matters and punishes those who misunderstand it". However, the two authors oppose on Hegelianism and historical materialism.

Maurras promotes "the essential harmony between the writer and the social forces that order the nation".

=== Influence ===
Maurras has frequented Parisian intellectual circles since his arrival in Paris on the Decembre 2, 1885, particularly the Roman School and the Félibrige. L'Avenir de l'intelligence enabled Maurras to extend his sphere of influence, particularly among young people "which was to manifest itself in the famous 1912 survey, Young people today, published jointly by the young Henri Massis and Alfred Tarde under the pseudonym of Agathon." This book contributes to the foundation of the "intellectual magisterium exercised by Maurras in the 1910s and 1920s, resulting in a revival of the monarchist idea after decades of decline".

In his dedication to his friend René-Marc Ferry at the beginning of the book, Charles Maurras writes this famous formula:

Any desperation in politics is absolute folly.

— Charles Maurras, L'Avenir de l'Intelligence

== Around the book ==
On 20 December 1926, Pope Pius XI ordered Catholics to break with Action Française and published the decree of the congregation of the Index of 29 January 1914, which condemned seven works by Maurras, including L'Avenir de l'intelligence.

The poet and playwright Thomas Stearns Eliot insert a quote in French from L’Avenir de l’intelligence in his poem Coriolan, "which he regards as a master book whose influences are largely found in his For Lancelot Andrewes".

== Bibliography ==
- Antoine de Crémiers (2023). "Quel avenir pour... " L'Avenir de l'intelligence " ?". Nouvelle Revue universelle. 4 (71): 127–142.
