= Barres =

Barres may refer to:

== People ==
=== Barrès ===
- Maurice Barrès (1862–1923), French novelist
- Philippe Barrès (1896–1975), French journalist (son of Maurice)
- Claude Barrès (1925–1959), French Army officer (son of Philippe & grandson of Maurice)

=== Barres ===
- Ben Barres (1954–2017), an American neurobiologist
- John Barres (b. 1960), U.S. Catholic priest, appointed Bishop of Allentown in 2009 (later appointed to Rockville Centre)

=== Des Barres ===
- Everard des Barres (also Eberhard von Barres or De Bären; died 1174), the third Grand Master of the Knights Templar
- Michael Des Barres (b. 1948), 26th Marquis Des Barres, British actor and rock singer
- Pamela Des Barres (born Pamela Ann Miller in 1948), an American former rock and roll groupie, author, and magazine writer (wife of Michael)

== Places ==
France

- Boulay-les-Barres, a commune in the Loiret department
- Cours-les-Barres, a commune in the Cher department
- Lacapelle-Barrès, a commune in the Cantal department
- Saint-Vincent-de-Barrès, a commune in the Ardèche department

Spain

- Barres (Castropol), a civil parish in Asturias

== Other uses ==
- Barres (film), a 1984 film by Luc Moullet
