= L'Idée de la décentralisation =

1898 book by Charles Maurras

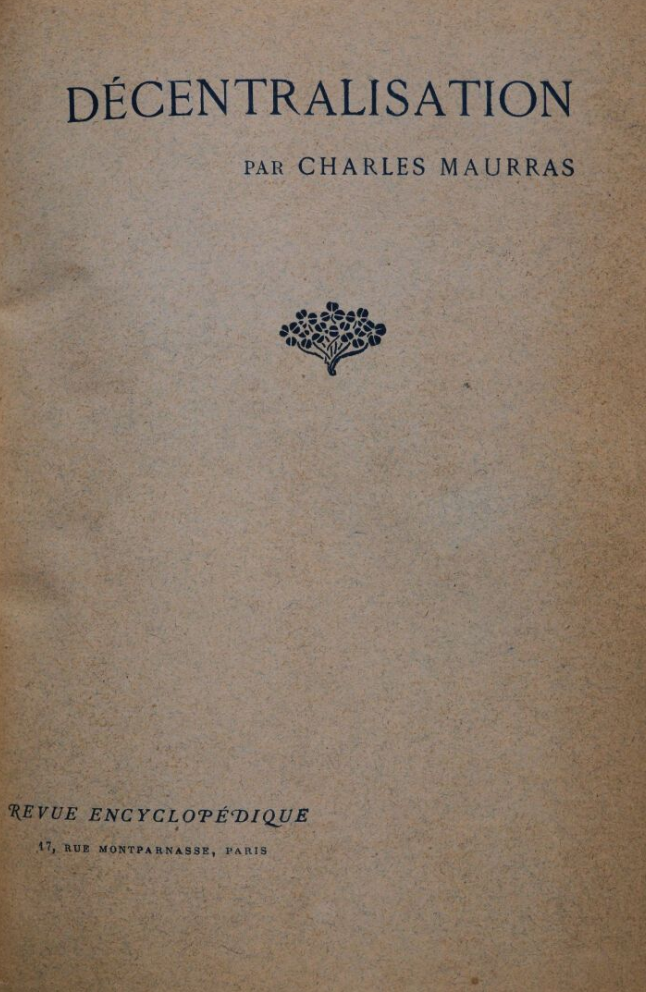
- Editor: Librairie de la Revue encyclopédique
- Author: Charles Maurras
- Publication date: 1898
- Publication place: France

L'Idée de la décentralisation (The Idea of decentralization) is a political booklet by the French journalist and politician Charles Maurras, member of the Félibrige then journalist and director of L'Action française, published in February 1898.

== Presentation ==
In this book, Maurras establishes the synonymy of « decentralization » with the « federalism » without confusing the two because decentralization is only the means to achieve a federal situation.

The book is specifically dedicated to Auguste Comte, Frédéric Le Play, Ernest Renan and Hippolyte Taine. He also greets the officers of the French army engaged with the Dreyfus affair. Maurras endorses the thesis developed by Maurice Barrès in Les Déracinés in 1897 by linking it to the Dreyfus affair on the grounds that the Jews would be in favor of centralism to weaken France.

In the first pages, Maurras takes stock of the previous defenders of decentralization, including Tocqueville, Proudhon, Louis-Xavier de Ricard or Maurice Barrès.

Since its participation in the Déclaration des Jeunes Félibres fédéralistes of 1892, the criticism of the jacobinism has matured. Historian Martin Motte observes that the author approaches the problem of Jacobinism no longer "from the point of view of Provençal identity, but from the point of view of French nationalism".

Maurras intends to deconstruct the received idea that centralization would guarantee stability and political efficiency. Indeed, despite centralism, France in the 19th century experienced five changes of regime and was crushed in 1870 by a Confederate Germany. Moreover, centralism has as its corollary a cosmopolitan conception of education which would consist in uprooting the child from his family, ethnic, social and intellectual determinisms. This results in particular in the language policy in France.

Maurras affirms that a State which takes care of everything ends up abandoning its sovereign functions and that a people who are denied the right to administer their daily life end up getting involved in discussions of high politics to which he hears nothing. Maurras prefers the synergy of a "sustainable central power" and "extensive local liberties". These are considered "essential to the moral and mental health of French society" on the grounds that they would give him "a taste for initiative, a sense of responsibility and pride in himself". The individual is the nucleus of the first community circle. Historian Stéphane Giocanti detects in his definition of decentralization a "properly Mistralian originality of his idea, which is that it cannot be reduced to a project of planned division, and that it evokes a dynamic applicable both to region, municipality or district, going beyond the legal definition of administrative territoriality to focus on the political reality of the citizen". However, decentralization is not a simple deconcentration of state powers.

Finally, Maurras does not exclude openness to the world in a "universalism respectful of diversity".

To dream of universal monarchy and to rise to the metaphysical sphere of the city of God, Dante is none the less the exact citizen of Florence; Sophocles the Athenian and Sophocles the universal are not two opposing figures that exclude each other, but the same character. And so with Goethe in Weimar, insofar as he attained classical genius.

— Charles Maurras

Maurras opposes the notion of rootedness to the cosmopolitan belief that the universe tends to unify. According to Martin Motte, history has given Maurras a reason so far because the world has gone from 53 independent states in 1914, to 74 in 1945 to more than 190 today.: "In this case, Maurras saw more accurately than the great geopoliticians of his time, the Ratzel, the Kjellén, Mahan and Haushofer, which all counted on the continuation of the process of spatial concentration".

The desired harmony of the world can only consist in a better order of existing varieties, not in their suppression.

— Charles Maurras

== Posterity ==
According to Frédéric Rouvillois, Maurras appears "as the one who synthesized, ordered, and basically invented that conservative neo-federalism which, Dean Vedel noted, is one of the deepest there is".

This booklet is one of the masterful references of Jean Charles-Brun in Le Régionalisme published in 1911 and for Maurice Barrès in Scènes et doctrines du nationalisme published in 1902.

== Links ==
Full text of L'Idée de la décentralisation on maurras.net

== Bibliography ==
- Rémi Soulié (2017). "Le jeune Maurras, félibre et fédéraliste". Nouvelle École (66): 49–54.
- René Jouveau (1972). "L'itinéraire félibréen de Charles Maurras avant l'Action française". Études maurrassiennes. 1. Aix-en-Provence: 81–88.
- Henri Morel (1972). "Charles Maurras et l'idée de décentralisation". Études maurrassiennes. 1. Aix-en-Provence: 115–144.
