= Louis Ménard =

French intellectual (1822–1901)

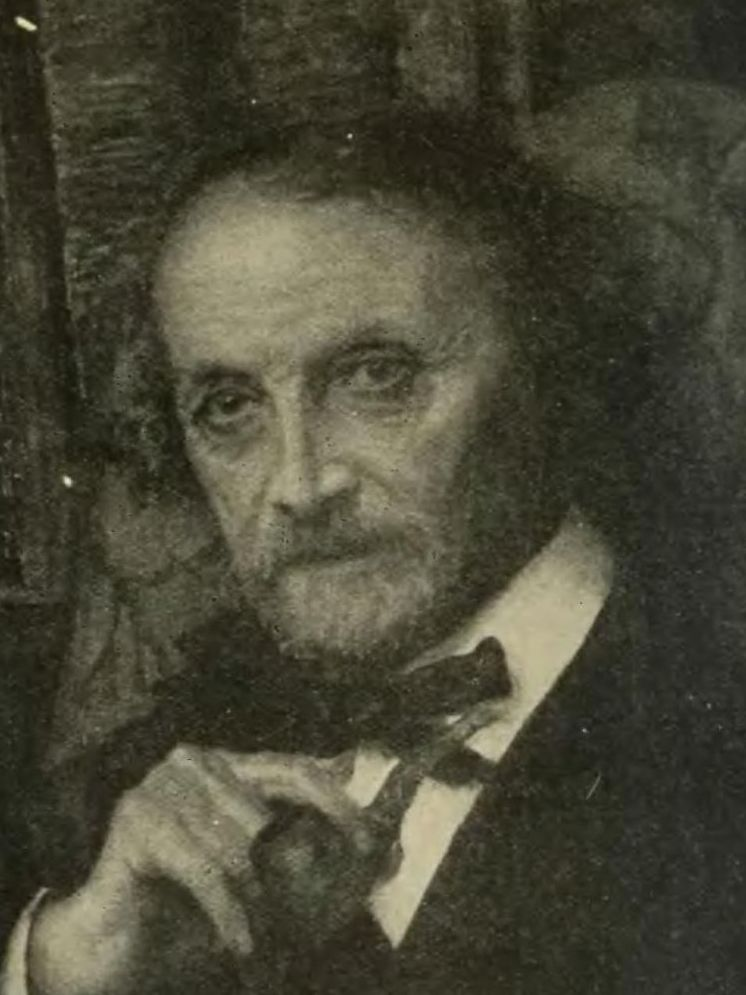
Louis Ménard

Louis-Nicolas Ménard (French pronunciation: [lwi nikɔla menaʁ]; 19 October 1822 – 9 February 1901) was a French man of letters also known for his early discoveries on collodion.

== Biography ==
He was born in Paris. His versatile genius occupied itself in turn with chemistry, poetry, painting and history. In 1843 he published, under the pseudonym of L. de Senneville, a translation of Prométhée délivré. Turning to chemistry, he discovered collodion in 1846, but its value was not recognized at the time; and its application later to surgery and photography brought him no advantage.

Ménard was a socialist, always in advance of the reform movements of his time. After 1848 he was condemned to imprisonment for his Prologue d'une révolution. He escaped to London, returning to Paris only in 1852. Until 1860 he occupied himself with classical studies, the fruits of which are to be seen in his Poèmes (1855), Polythéisme hellénique (1863), and two academic theses, De sacra poesi graecorum and La Morale avant les philosophes (1860).

The next ten years Ménard spent chiefly among the Barbizon artists, and he exhibited several pictures. He was in London at the time of the Paris Commune, and defended it with his pen. In 1887 he became professor at the École des Arts décoratifs, and in 1895 professor of universal history at the Hôtel de Ville in Paris. Ménard died in Paris on 9 February 1901.

His works include: Histoire des anciens peuples de l'Orient (1882); Histoire des Israélites d'après l'exégèse biblique (1883), and Histoire des Grecs (1884-1886).

== Mystical paganism ==
A free-thinker and critic of both Christianity and attempts to overcome religion through reason and science, Ménard described his religious views as "mystical paganism", which he expounded through his poetry and prose works. His Du polythéisme hellénique (1863) lays out his understanding of ancient Greek religion. Rêveries d'un paien mystique (1876), which contained sonnets, philosophical dialogues and some stories, was followed in 1896 by Poèmes et rêveries d'un paien mystique. With his neopaganism and hellenism, which was similar to what earlier had been expressed by Gérard de Nerval, he had an impact on the Parnassian movement of poetry. There is an appreciation of Ménard in the opening chapter of Maurice Barrès' Le Voyage de Sparte.

== List of works ==
- 1844. Prométhée délivré (under the pseudonym L. de Senneville)
- 1848. Prologue d'une révolution, février-juin 1848 (under the pseudonym Louis de Senneville)
- 1855. Poëmes, E. Dentu.
- 1860. De sacra poesi Graecorum.
- 1860. De la morale avant les philosophes.
- 1863. Du polythéisme hellénique, Charpentier.
- 1866. Hermès Trismégiste. Paris : Didier.
- 1872. Éros : étude sur la symbolique du désir, J. Claye.
- 1875. Catéchisme religieux des libres-penseurs, Hurtau.
- 1876. Rêveries d'un païen mystique, Lemerre.
- 1882. Histoire des anciens peuples de l'Orient, Delagrave.
- 1883. Histoire des Israélites d'après l'exégèse biblique, Delagrave.
- 1893. Études sur les origines du christianisme, Librairie de l'Art indépendant.
- 1894. Histoire des Grecs, Delagrave.
- 1895. Lettres d’un mort: opinions d'un païen sur la société moderne, Librairie de l'Art indépendant.
- 1895. Poèmes et Rèveries d'un paien mistiqe [sic], Librairie de l'Art indépendant.
- 1897. Les Oracles, Librairie de l'Art indépendant.
- 1898. Les Qestions [sic] sociales dans l'Antiqité [sic] : cours d'istoire [sic] universèle [sic], Librairie de l'Art indépendant.
- 1898. La Seconde Républiqe [sic] : cours d'istoire [sic] universèle [sic], Bibliothèque de la Plume.
- 1898. Symboliqe [sic] religieuse : Cours d'istoire [sic] universèle [sic].
- 1898. Le Cours royal inédit au Grand siècle, Picard & fils.
- 1901. Lavardin à travers le temps, Imprimerie Lebert, Montoire.
