= Frances Wilson Huard =

American writer, translator and lecturer (1885–1969)

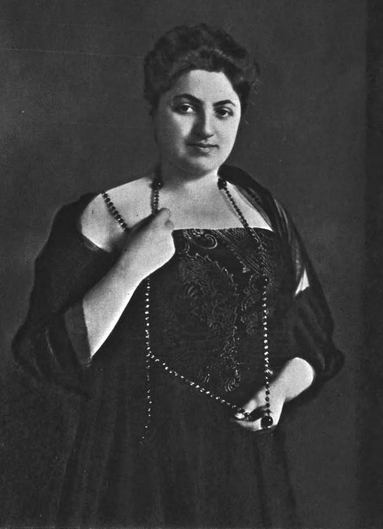
Frances Wilson Huard, from a 1918 publication

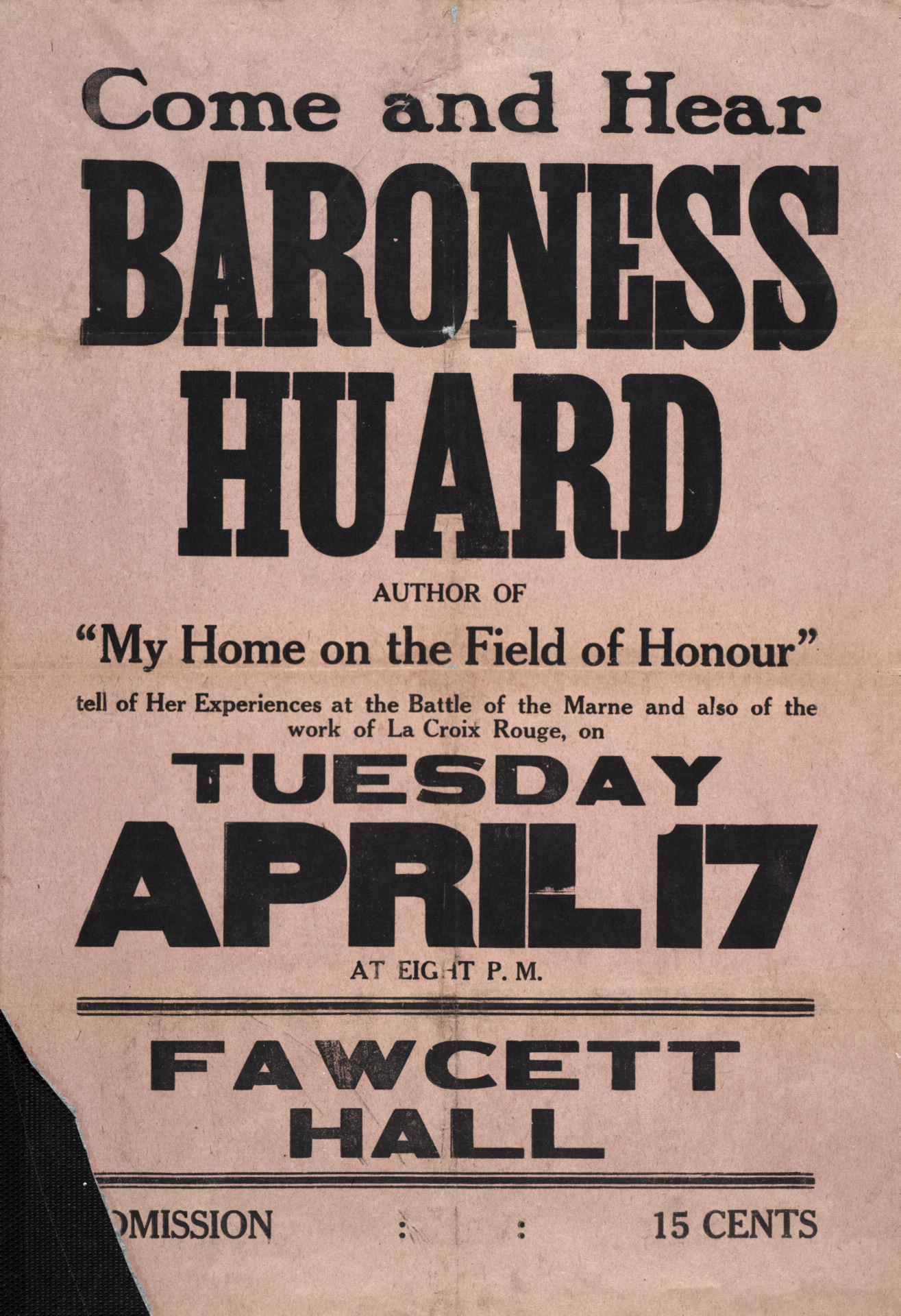
Flyer for a 1917 lecture

Frances Wilson Huard (October 2, 1885 – February 1969) was an American-born writer, translator, and lecturer who wrote memoirs of life during World War I in France.

== Early life ==
Frances Barrie Wilson was the daughter of comic actor Francis Wilson and his first wife, actress Mira Barrie.

== Career ==
Huard is best known for her memoirs, My Home in the Field of Honour (1916), and My Home in the Field of Mercy (1917), both about living in France during World War I. Her husband Charles Huard, a French artist, provided illustrations for her books. She described turning their summer estate at Villiers, near Soissons, into a hospital, riding a bicycle after her horses were requisitioned, and managing a household under wartime conditions. In one incident, rather than waking the young men assigned for late night guard duty, she (and her dogs) went in their stead:

Poor little chaps, it seemed a pity to wake them, but what was to be done? Presently an idea of replacing them myself dawned upon me: a second later it so enchanted me that I wouldn't have had them wake for anything. The whole thing was beginning to be terribly romantic. Slipping quietly away, I went to my room and got my revolver, and then going to the south front of the château, I softly whistled for my dogs... With these five as bodyguard I sauntered up the road in the brilliant moonlight, arriving in front of the town hall just as the clock was striking eleven.

Her home was damaged by bombs and occupied by German troops. Later in the war, she ran a hospital in Paris. During and after the war, she toured the United States and Canada as a lecturer and sold her husband's etchings to raise funds for post-war relief.

Other works by Huard were With Those Who Wait (1918), Lilies, White and Red (1919, a book of short fiction), American Footprints in Paris (1921, co-authored with François Boucher), and a biography of her husband, Charles Huard, 1874–1965 (1969).

She also translated Maurice Barrès' novel Colette Baudoche (1918), Marcel Nadaud's The Flying Poilu: A Story of Aerial Warfare (1918), Alfred de Vigny's Military Servitude and Grandeur (1919), and Paul Arène's The Golden Goat (1921) into English. She wrote essays from France for American publications, including The Century, The Bookman, and Scribner's Magazine.

Her American family feared for her safety in France again during World War II.

== Personal life ==
Frances Wilson married artist Charles Adolphe Huard in 1905. She was widowed when he died in 1965, at their home in Poncey-sur-l'Ignon. She died in 1969, aged 84 years.
