= Homme libre =

Un Homme libre or hommes libres may refer to:

- Un Homme libre, an 1889 book by Maurice Barrès, part of The Cult of the Self trilogy
- Un Homme libre, a 2000 solo album by Cheb Sahraoui
- Comme un homme libre French title for the 1979 film The Jericho Mile

== See also ==
- Freeman (disambiguation)
