= Henri Achille Etiévant =

Henri Etiévant
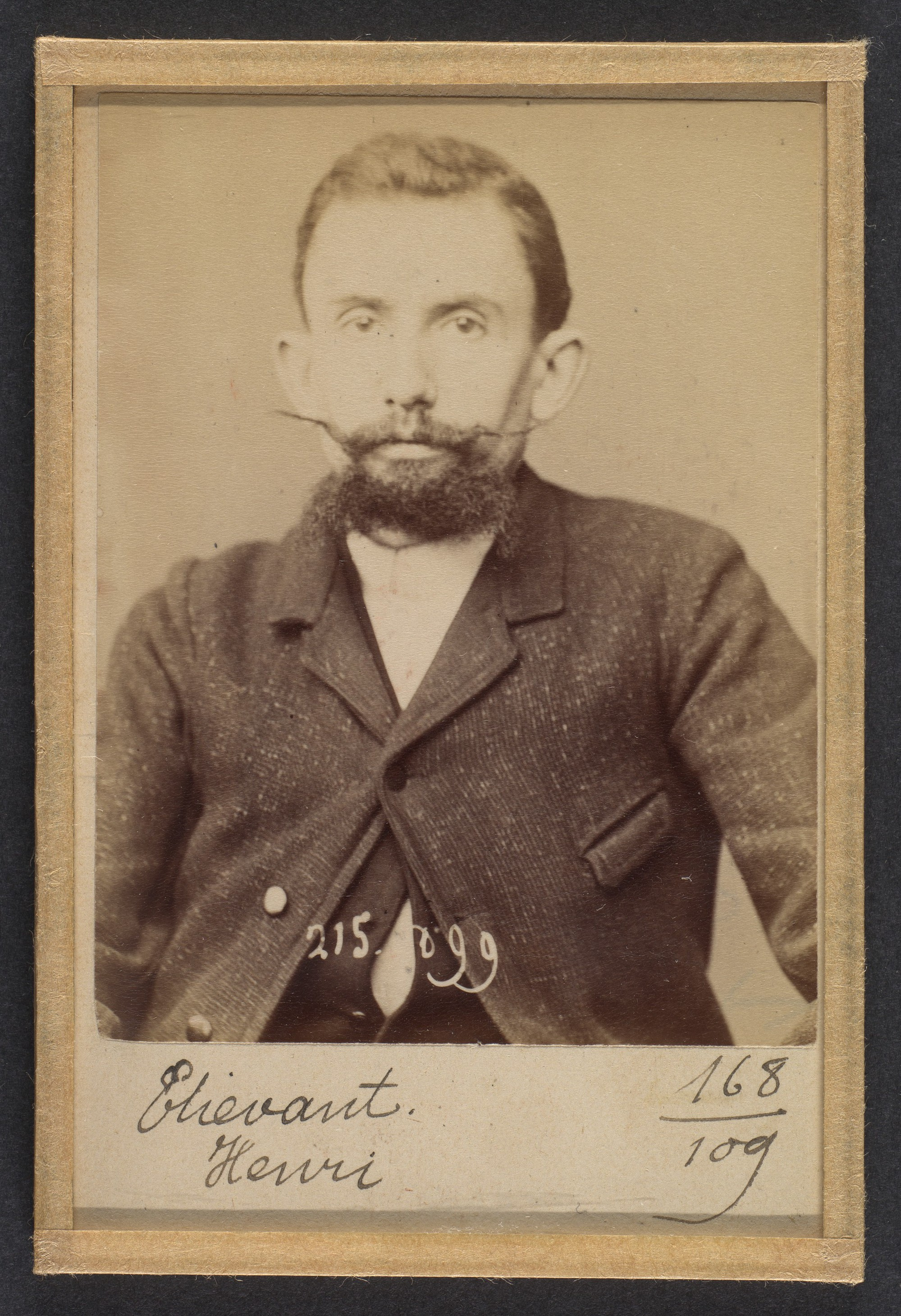
- Henri Etiévant's mugshot taken by Alphonse Bertillon (Anthropometric File of Anarchists - 1894)
- Born: June 14, 1861; Flamanville, France
- Died: 15 January 1929; Plaisir, France
- Citizenship: France
- Occupation: typographer
- Movement: Anarchism

Henri Etiévant (1861–1929), also known as 'the Boatswain', was a French typographer and anarchist. He is best known for his influence on the anarchist movement, and some historians have described him as one of the 'leading lights' of the anarchist movement in France during the 1890s.

As the older brother of Georges Etiévant, the two siblings were involved in a number of joint activities. They associated with Émile Henry, and were involved in actions to defend the protagonists of the Clichy affair. In February 1892, at the start of a period the French public called the Ère des attentats (1892–1894), both were noted as being very radical and wanting to avenge the anarchists hanged in Jerez. A few weeks later, when a group of anarchists committed the Soisy-sur-Seine theft, stealing a large amount of dynamite—some of which was later used by Ravachol's group for their attacks—Henri was involved and hid the stolen dynamite for a time. The authorities suspected him of participating in the theft, just like his brother, whose involvement was proven, but Henri was released due to a lack of evidence. He continued to associate with anarchists, becoming a notable figure in those circles, and for a while, he lived off stolen goods before returning to his job as a typographer. Despite being targeted many times by French authorities, he managed to avoid any serious convictions. He was documented as an anarchist until at least the period of 1900–1912.

His police mugshot is part of the collections of the Metropolitan Museum of Art (MET).

== Biography ==
=== Youth and integration into the anarchist movement ===
Henri Achille Etiévant was born on 14 June 1861 in Flamanville, in the department of Manche.

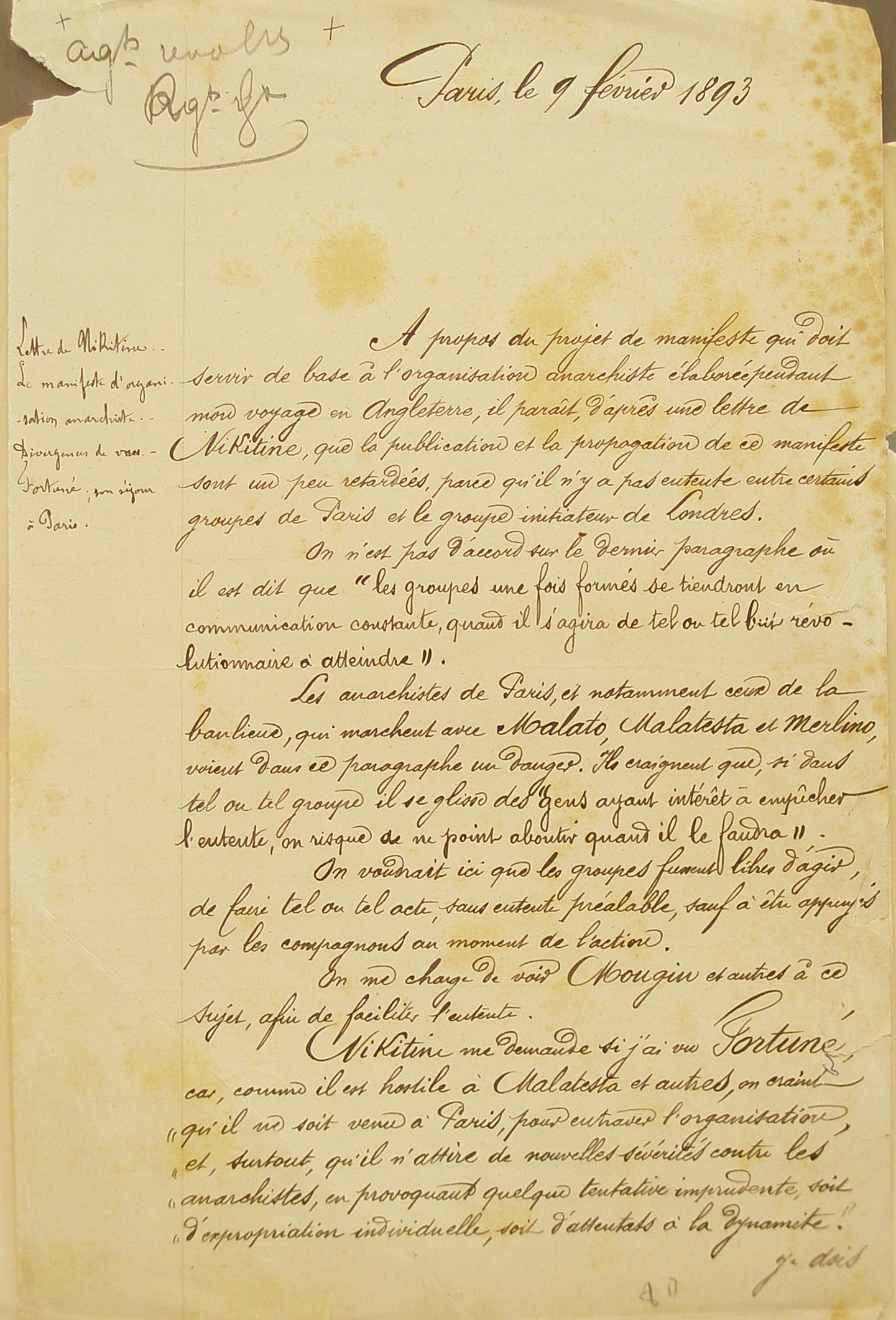
First part of a report providing information on ongoing conflicts within the anarchist movement regarding bombings, with Nikitin (police informant) and Malatesta fearing a new attack that could intensify repression against anarchists, while Fortuné Henry would support it. (courtesy of Archives anarchistes)

He lived with his father for a long time in Clichy, on rue Bac d'Asnières. He was also medically discharged from military service and deemed unfit to serve due to his build, for 'lack of height and deformity'. In the 1880s and 1890s, Etiévant joined the anarchist movement with his younger brother, Georges. He was the organizer of the 1st of May 1891 demonstration and later that year contributed to the anarchist newspaper Le Forçat with his brother, a paper on which they likely collaborated with Émile Henry. During this time, he worked as a typographer in Clichy.

In September 1891, the Etiévant brothers were noted by authorities for putting up posters in honor of Louis Léveillé, Henri Decamps, and Charles Dardare, the three anarchist protagonists of the Clichy affair.

=== Ère des attentats (1892-1894) ===
In February 1892, at the beginning of a period that public opinion called the Ère des attentats (1892–1894), the two brothers, who often acted together, announced they were seeking to avenge the anarchists hanged in Jerez, Spain, and intended to commit serious acts where they would risk their lives. The police authorities paid little attention to this information and did not act on it. A few days after these initial reports, a group of anarchists—particularly from the northern suburbs of Paris—committed a major theft of dynamite from a quarry: this was the Soisy-sur-Seine theft.

This stolen dynamite, which partly ended up in the hands of Ravachol's group and was used by him to commit his attacks in March 1892, was at least partially hidden by the Etiévant brothers in a room they rented, where a number of anarchists gathered, including Louis Galau, Louis Léveillé, Rousset, and Élisée Bastard. On 23 February, an initial raid was carried out, without success, and on 12 March 1892, the day after the Saint-Germain bombing, a new raid and arrest of the two brothers led to evidence of Georges's participation in the Soisy theft. The police did not have any elements to indict Henri, so he was released.

As soon as he was released, Etiévant, at a meeting in Levallois, called for the example set by Ravachol to be followed by other anarchists. He spent time with Émile Henry, this time at the home of the communard and companion Constant Martin and another wine merchant during the summer of 1892. He stopped working, spent time with Lucien Fétis, and openly advocated for individual reclamation as the preferred means of subsistence for anarchists. He and Fétis went on door-to-door collections to organize the soup-conferences. At the end of the year, he visited his father who had just been placed in an asylum.

He resumed work as a typographer in 1893. In June, he participated with Léveillé and Émile Spannagel in a meeting against the death sentence of Jean-Baptiste Foret.

During the repression of early 1894, he was targeted twice, once on the first day, and again on 4 March 1894. In the first instance, the police found copies of La Révolte, a pamphlet by Jules Guesde, and a letter from Léon Léauthier 'to his friend Etiévant'. In the second instance, they found nothing particularly incriminating neither, only pamphlets and letters to his imprisoned brother.

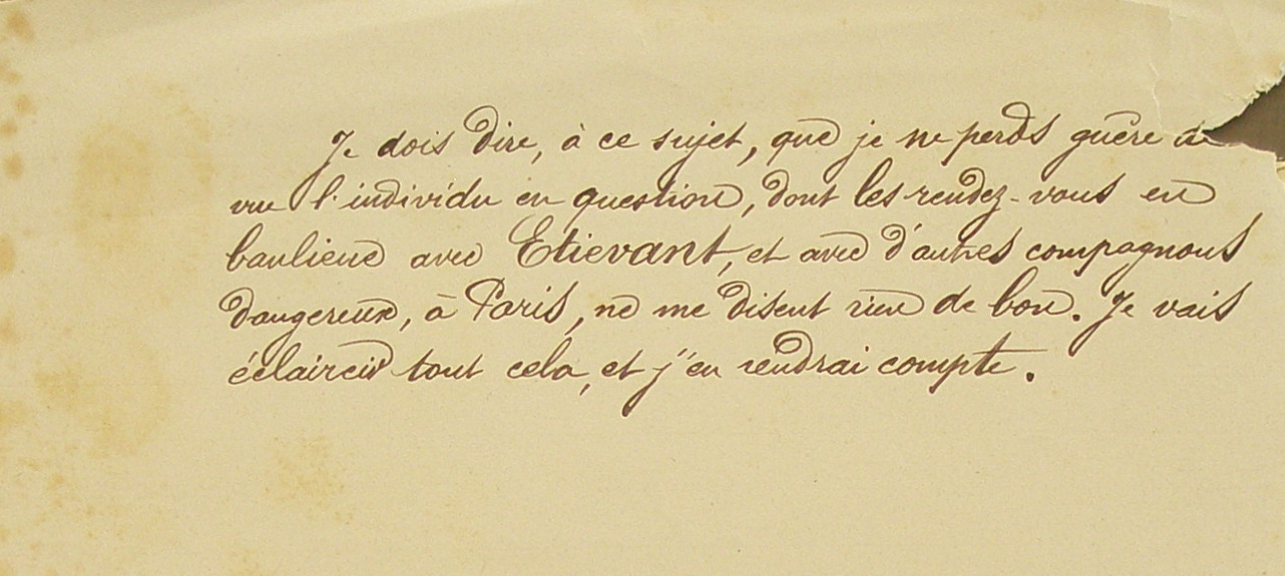
Conclusion of the previous report, noting numerous meetings between Fortuné Henry and Henri Étiévant

Arrested and taken to Mazas prison, he wrote to the investigating judge that he was afraid of being evicted, as he lived alone and had not yet paid the rent. He wrote:

I am absolutely alone, as you know, mister the judge, so no one has been able to fix the mess that was made in my home because when the search was conducted, everything was turned upside down—my family papers, my printing samples necessary for my work, the pages of a dictionary I have been working on for several years, my laundry—everything was scattered on the floor or on the furniture which was left open since I was immediately arrested.

He was released on 5 June 1894, found a job, and was then arrested again after the assassination of Sadi Carnot, on 1 July 1894, and freed on the 28th of the same month.

=== Later years ===
Henri Etiévant continued to be listed as an anarchist by the French authorities at least until 1900–1912. He died in Plaisir on 15 January 1929. In addition to receiving the nickname 'Le Bosco' (i.e. 'the Boatswain'); he is considered by historian Vivien Bouhey to be one of the 'leading lights' of the anarchist movement in France during this period. His police mugshot is part of the collections of the Metropolitan Museum of Art (MET).

== Bibliography ==
- Bouhey, Vivien (2008), Les Anarchistes contre la République [The Anarchists against the Republic] (in French), Rennes: Presses universitaires de Rennes (PUR)
- Dupuy, Rolf; Petit, Dominique (2025), "ETIEVANT, Henri, Achille "Le BOSCO"", Dictionnaire international des militants anarchistes, Paris
- Petit, Dominique (2024), ETIEVANT Henri, Achille dit LE BOSCO, Paris: Le Maitron
