= Chronique de la Grande Guerre =

Book series by Maurice Barrès

- Author: Maurice Barrès
- Country: France
- Language: French
- Genre: columns
- Publisher: Plon-Nourrit
- Published: 1920–1924
- No. of books: 14

Chronique de la Grande Guerre (lit. 'Chronicle of the Great War') is a series of books about World War I by the French writer Maurice Barrès.

== Summary ==
The books collect columns Maurice Barrès wrote for L'Écho de Paris during World War I and its immediate aftermath, providing both personal experiences and perspectives of French soldiers Barrès met. Barrès incorporated many forms of journalism in his texts, including surveys, interviews, book reviews, reports and obituaries. On occasions, Barrès complains about the wartime censorship and how he only is allowed to visit sectors of the front chosen by authorities, which prevents him from using the "method of the old Homer" and letting "the full flame of the national tragedy erupt before us".

== Publication ==
Chronique de la Grande Guerre was published in 14 volumes by Plon-Nourrit from 1920 to 1924. It followed Barrès' L'Âme française et la guerre, published in 12 volumes in 1915–1920. A selection of texts from Chronique de la Grande Guerre was republished in a 1968 volume edited by Guy Dupré.

== Reception ==
Chronique de la Grande Guerre became largely forgotten among general readers. Historians of World War I have typically read it as an expression of a particular non-combattant elite attitude toward the war.

The scholar Denis Pernot wrote in 2017 that the columns with their disparate content give the impression of a daily newspaper. He wrote that it is clear Barrès tried to make readers feel the sacrifices of the war were worth it and that there is a strong focus on efforts to create peace. Pernot characterised Barrès' self-appointed role as twofold: to produce documentation for future historians and to be a type of bard who acts as an "upholder of fraternity".

== Volumes ==
1. Chronique de la Grande Guerre: 1er février - 4 octobre 1914
2. Chronique de la Grande Guerre: 14 octobre - 31 décembre 1914
3. Chronique de la Grande Guerre: 1er janvier - 11 mars 1915
4. Chronique de la Grande Guerre: 12 mars - 31 mai 1915
5. Chronique de la Grande Guerre: 1er juin - 24 août 1915
6. Chronique de la Grande Guerre: 25 août - 11 décembre 1915
7. Chronique de la Grande Guerre: 12 décembre 1915 - 9 avril 1916
8. Chronique de la Grande Guerre: 11 avril - 24 août 1916
9. Chronique de la Grande Guerre: 3 septembre 1916 - 28 juin 1917
10. Chronique de la Grande Guerre: 1er juillet - 1er décembre 1917
11. Chronique de la Grande Guerre: 2 décembre 1917 -23 avril 1918
12. Chronique de la Grande Guerre: 24 avril - 7 août 1918
13. Chronique de la Grande Guerre: 8 août 1918 - 29 mai 1919
14. Chronique de la Grande Guerre: 1er juin 1919 - 4 juillet 1920
