= L'Intransigeant =

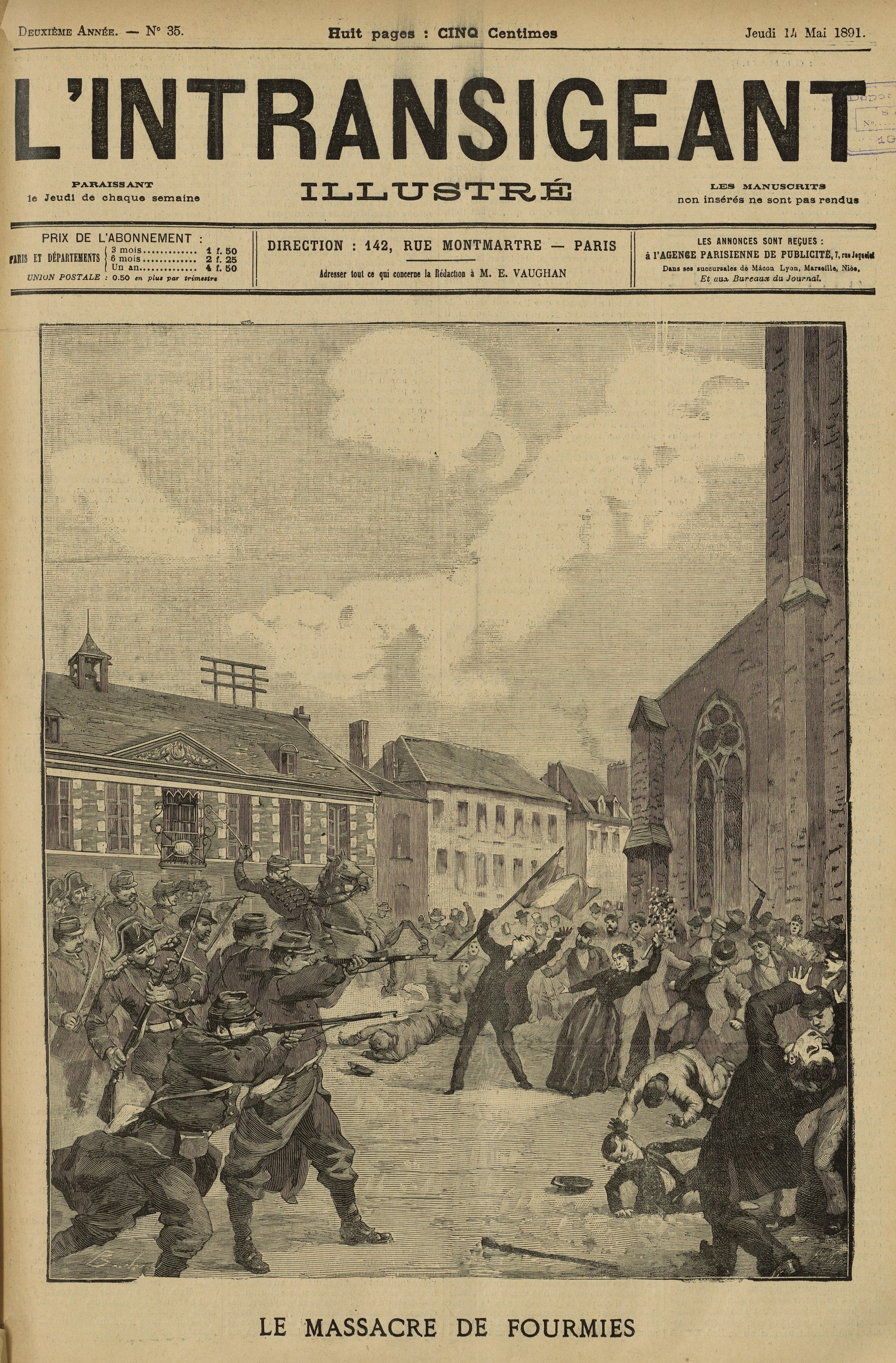
- Front page from 14 May 1891
- Type: Daily newspaper
- Founder: Henri Rochefort
- Founded: July 1880
- Ceased publication: 1940
- Language: French

L'Intransigeant was a French newspaper founded in July 1880 by Henri Rochefort. Initially representing the left-wing opposition, it moved towards the right during the Boulanger affair (Rochefort supported Boulanger) and became a major right-wing newspaper by the 1920s. The newspaper was vehemently anti-Dreyfusard, reflecting Rochefort's positions. In 1906 under the direction of Léon Bailby it reaches a circulation of 400,000 copies. It ceased publication after the French surrender in 1940. After the war it was briefly republished in 1947 under the name L'Intransigeant-Journal de Paris, before merging with Paris-Presse.
