= The Sacred Hill =

1913 novel by Maurice Barrès

- First edition title page
- Author: Maurice Barrès
- Original title: La Colline inspirée
- Translator: Malcolm Cowley
- Language: French
- Publisher: Émile-Paul Frères
- Publication date: 1913
- Publication place: France
- English publication date: 1929
- Pages: 428

The Sacred Hill (French: La colline inspirée) is a 1913 novel by the French writer Maurice Barrès. It tells the story of three monks who turn the hill colline de Saxon-Sion in Lorraine into a place of worship, which then develops into a cult inspired by the heretic Eugène Vintras. It was translated into English with a foreword by Malcolm Cowley in 1929.

In 1950 Le Figaro named the book as one of the winners of the "Grand Prix des meilleurs romans du demi-siècle", a prestigious literary competition to find the twelve best French novels of the first half of the twentieth century.
