= Émile Spannagel =

French anarchist and illegalist (1874-?)

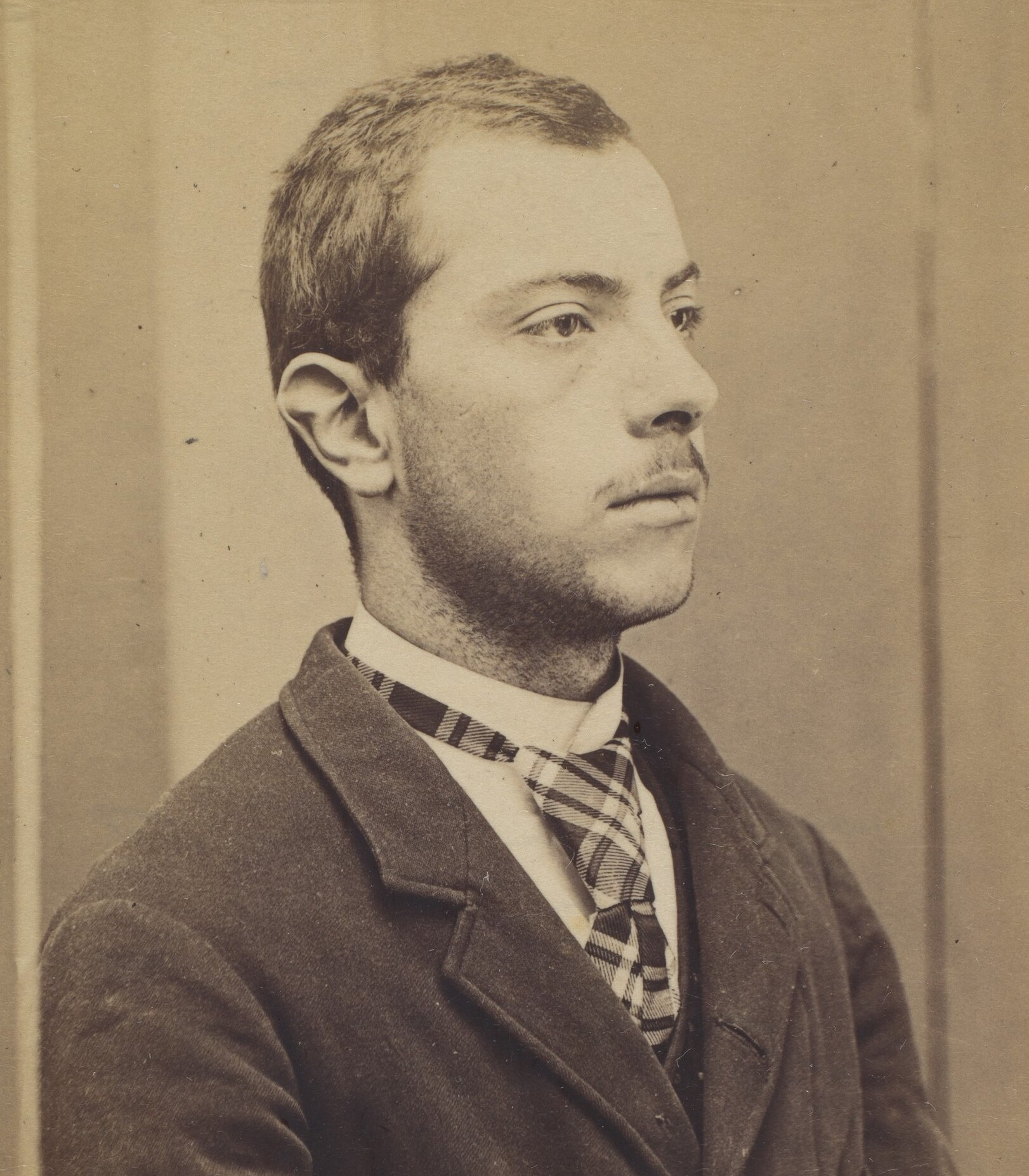
- Émile Spannagel's mugshot taken by Alphonse Bertillon (Anthropometric File of Anarchists - 1893)
- Born: February 28, 1874; Paris, France
- Citizenship: France
- Occupations: locksmith anarchist electrician
- Movement: Anarchism

Émile Spannagel (1874 – 20th century) was a French locksmith and illegalist anarchist. He is best known for his central role in the early years of illegalism, where he founded one of the first groups of this tendency, the Spannagel gang.

Born in Paris, Spannagel joined the anarchist movement before he was twenty and integrated into anarchist groups in the northern suburbs of Paris, particularly in Levallois-Perret. There he associated with other anarchists, such as Louis Léveillé and Louis Galau, and established an illegalist group with them, among others. Their gang engaged in a number of actions, burglaries, and thefts. In 1893, he was implicated in the failed burglary of the l'Urbaine company, where his anarchist companion Jean-Baptiste Foret shot a guard. Spannagel managed to escape for a time before being arrested. Two months later, Spannagel was again implicated after the discovery of bombs in a garden near one of his Levallois companions before being released. In October 1893, Spannagel participated in a violent burglary on an elderly capitalist, whom he knocked out with a knuckle duster and a revolver butt. The victim died from his injuries three months later. After being arrested, the fear he inspired allegedly deterred witnesses from speaking, and he was released. In 1894, Spannagel was arrested during a large police raid targeting a number of people in his group. Spannagel received the heaviest sentence of the twenty or so defendants during the 'sensational' trial of the gang and was sentenced to life deportation to a penal colony. He is said to have escaped from the penal colony in 1906.

His police mugshot is part of the collections of the Metropolitan Museum of Art (MET).

== Biography ==
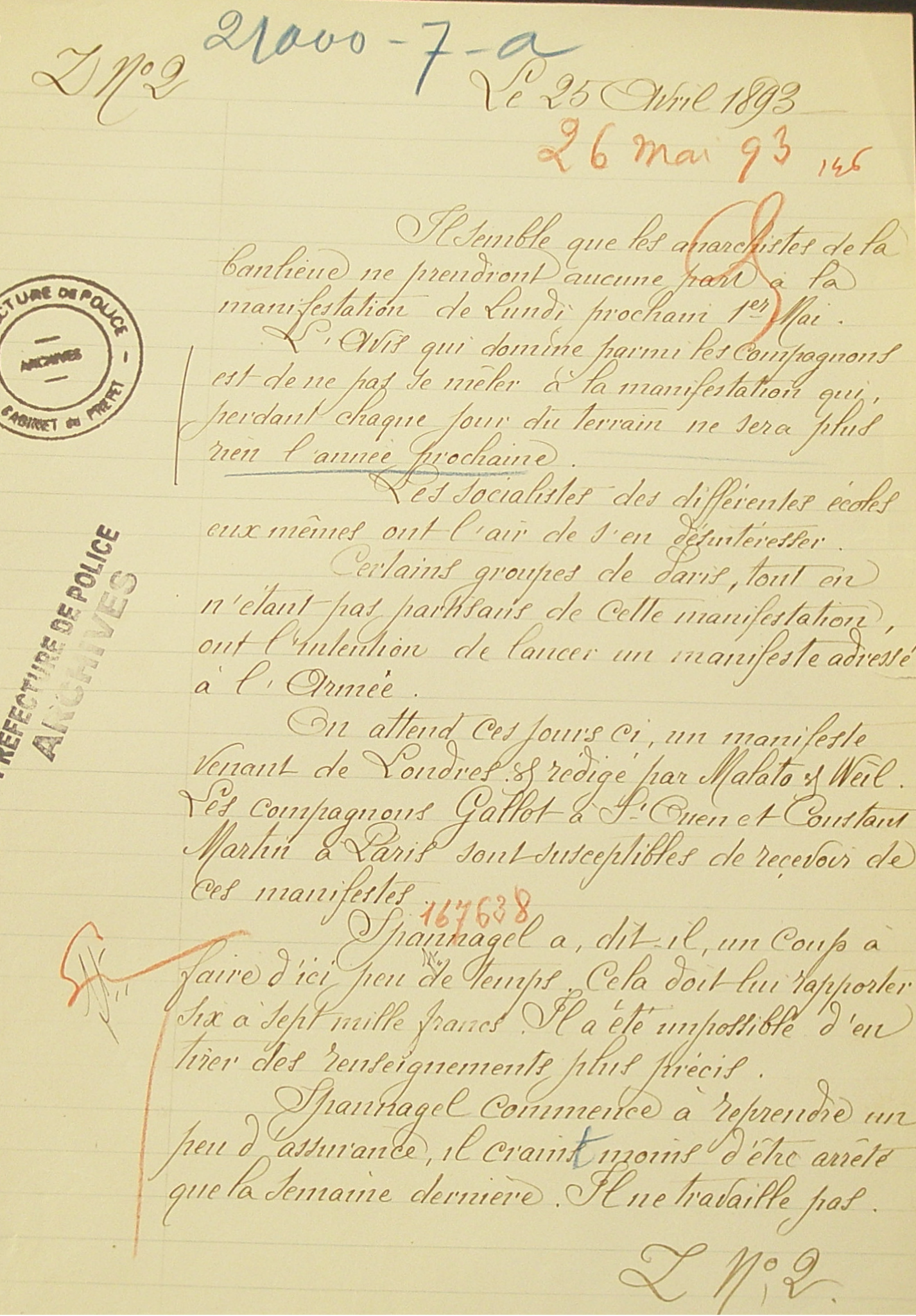
Police informant Z2 speaking about Spannagel who would be preparing an 'affair' (courtesy of Archives anarchistes)

Émile Ignace Spannagel was born on 28 February 1874, in Paris. He joined the anarchist movement in France before he was twenty; and in the early 1890s, was a member of the anarchist group of Levallois-Perret, where Gustave Bondon, Louis Léveillé, and Jules Vinchon were also present. During this period, anarchist groups in the northern suburbs of Paris were characterized by significant working-class participation and notable radicalism; they were then a radical anarchist youth and strong supporters of methods such as propaganda of the deed and individual reclamation.

In 1892, Spannagel was implicated by authorities after the strike of the Urbaine company, where he was allegedly involved in a case of 'assault and battery and obstruction of the freedom to work', but he was released.

From this period, the anarchist began to gather a gang of illegalist companions composed of about twenty people, almost all of whom were young, between 15 and 22 years old. The Spannagel gang, where he was a central figure, was very methodical in searching for places or people to burgle and participated in numerous burglaries and thefts during this period. In particular, the Galau family, composed of Louis Galau and most of his seven children, and Louis Léveillé seemed to be members of this affinity group. Their group was also directly involved in the counterfeiting of money with the stolen jewelry that was melted down.

=== The Urbaine affair ===
In early January 1892, Galau was hired by the company L'Urbaine. He allegedly spoke with a man named Jean Perrin—who may have been Spannagel—and invited him to help. They were reportedly joined by Jean-Baptiste Foret, whom Élisée Bastard had brought from Reims and who was staying with Galau. On the night of 30 January, Galau supposedly led his companions into the company's building to commit a burglary. The gang came face-to-face with a security guard, and Foret shot and wounded him in the arm before the group fled. Foret and Spannagel managed to evade the police for a time and are believed to have authored the Dynamiters' Manifesto, which was posted in Levallois during this period.

In February 1893, Spannagel was arrested for this incident with his companion Marceau as they were leaving a wine merchant's shop in Levallois-Perret. The two were in possession of letters from Henri Étiévant, tools for burglaries, and were armed with revolvers. They defended themselves by fully admitting to being friends with Étiévant and to being anarchists, but they stated they were on their way to a protest when they were arrested.

=== The Levallois bombs affair ===
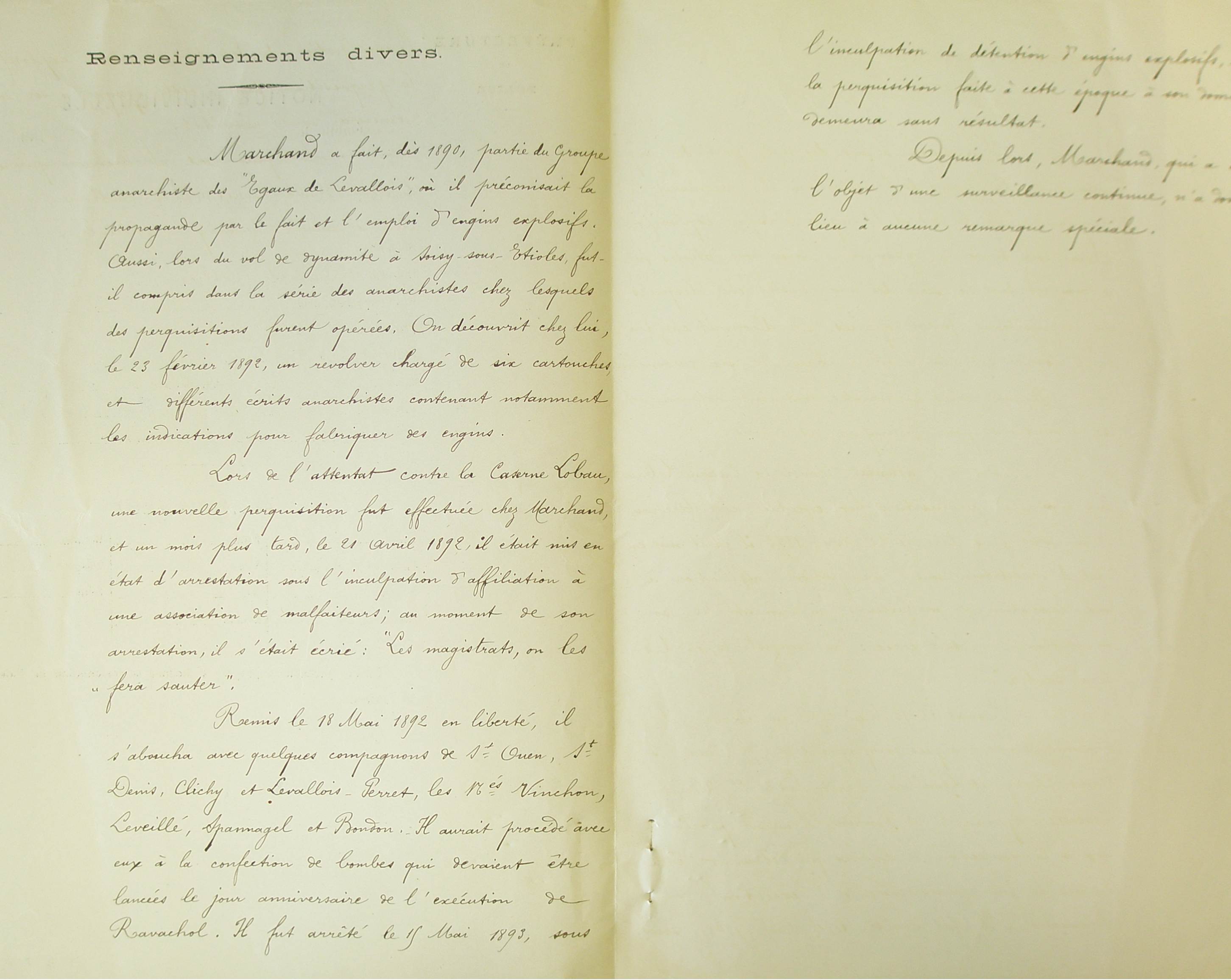
Report on Spannagel-Marchand links by French police and Spannagel who would be making explosives with Marchand (courtesy of Archives anarchistes)

In May 1893, the Levallois-Perret group to which he belonged was targeted by authorities after a basket of bombs was discovered in a garden near Vinchon's home. Spannagel was arrested but cleared and released, while Vinchon was sentenced to five years in prison in June 1893.

In June and July 1893, Spannagel and Galau made fake keys that were later used by Léveillé and Joseph Ouin in the Vienne affair—a burglary of a drapery store that yielded over fifty thousand francs. In August, he moved and fenced the goods stolen by Albert and Brunet after their arrest.

=== The Moitrier affair ===
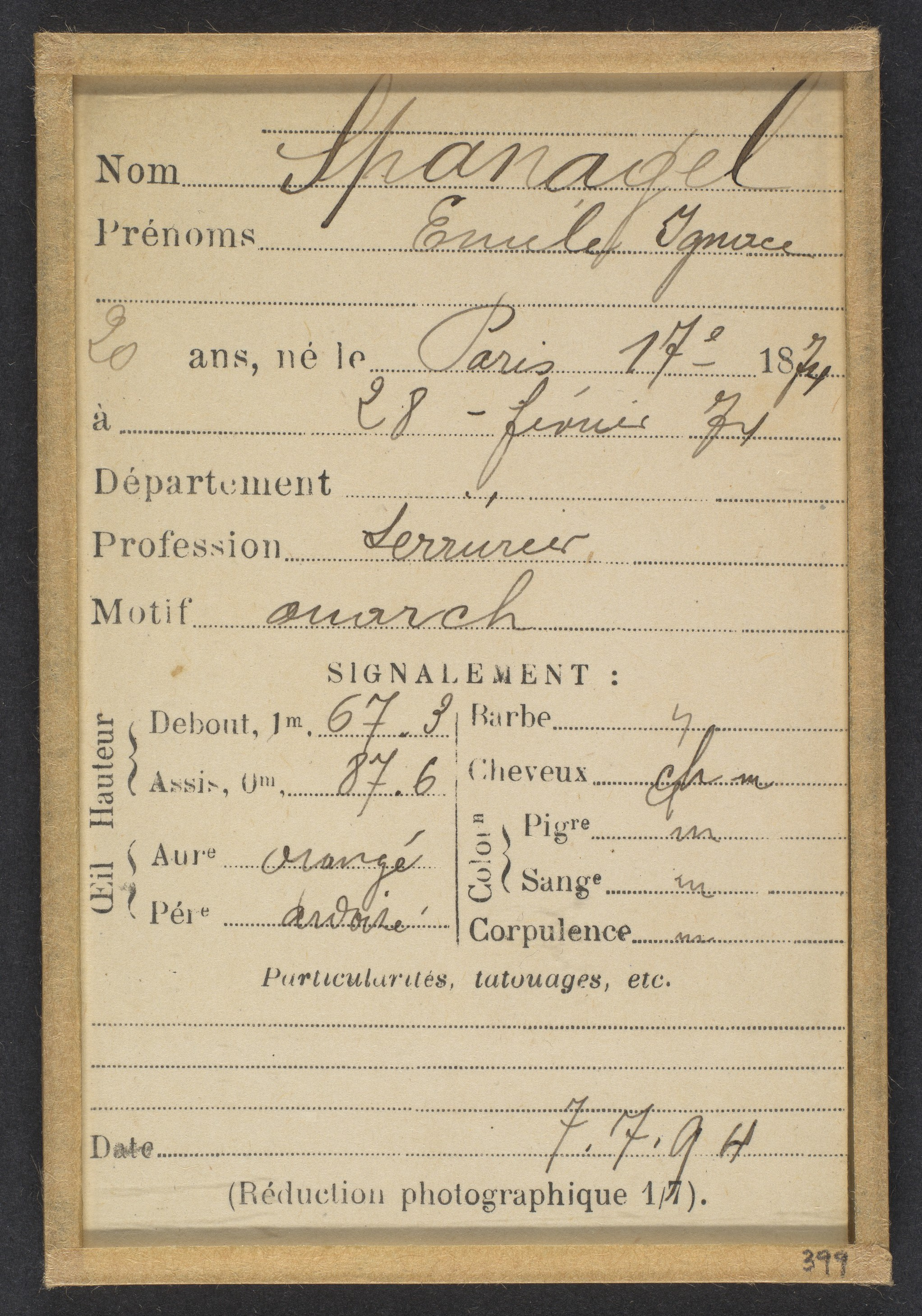
Spannagel's Bertillon file (1894)

In October 1893, a group of two or three men broke into the home of an 80-year-old capitalist named Moitrier in Levallois-Perret. Spannagel hit him on the head with a knuckle duster and a revolver butt before Moitrier was tied up, gagged, and robbed. The assailants took 500 francs in cash, 3,500 in securities, and some jewelry, after cracking his safe.

During the police investigation, they discovered that the husband of Moitrier's granddaughter, a locksmith named Fournier, was allegedly behind the operation. He had reportedly told Charles 'Charlot' Guermann, a notable anarchist of the period, that they should 'burgle' and 'delete' Moitrier. Spannagel, Guermann, and a man named Charles Pietri were in the vicinity of the robbery and were therefore suspected. Charles Pietri, Spannagel, and his partner were arrested, and the police found the stolen goods at her home. Guermann managed to escape and disappeared.

According to the press, the fear inspired by the group reportedly deterred anyone from speaking, leading to their release due to a lack of evidence and testimony. Moitrier died from his injuries three months later.

=== Trial of the Spannagel gang and later years ===
In December 1894, the following year, significant police raids led to the arrest of dozens of people, including Spannagel, his brothers Alfred and Victor, and the Galau family, which included Louis Galau and most of his seven children. Their trial, which took place in June 1895, was 'sensational', according to historian Vivien Bouhey. The 19 defendants were accused of criminal association and sentenced to heavy penalties.

Émile Spannagel received the harshest sentence, being sentenced to lifelong deportation to a penal colony.

He is believed to have escaped in 1906.

== Legacy ==
=== Police mugshot ===
His police mugshot is part of the collections of the Metropolitan Museum of Art (MET).

== Bibliography ==
- Bouhey, Vivien (2008), Les Anarchistes contre la République [The Anarchists against the Republic] (in French), Rennes: Presses universitaires de Rennes (PUR)
- Petit, Dominique (2024), SPANNAGEL Émile, Ignace, Paris: Le Maitron
- P. S. (2025), "SPANNAGEL, Emille, Ignace", Dictionnaire international des militants anarchistes, Paris
