= Colette Baudoche =

1909 novel by Maurice Barrès

- Author: Maurice Barrès
- Translator: Frances Wilson Huard
- Language: French
- Publisher: Juven
- Publication date: 1909
- Publication place: France
- English publication date: 1918
- Pages: 258

Colette Baudoche is a 1909 novel by the French writer Maurice Barrès. It has the subtitle The Story of a Young Girl of Metz (French: Histoire d'une jeune fille de Metz). The story is set in Lorraine right after the Franco-Prussian War 1870–1871, and focuses on the courtship between a young French woman and a German professor. The book was adapted into the 1994 short film Lothringen! by Straub–Huillet.
