= Claude Barrès =

French Army officer (1925–1959)

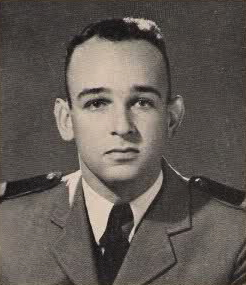
- Born: 22 March 1925; Charmes, France
- Died: 26 May 1959 (aged 34); Djebel Harraba, Algeria
- Relatives: Maurice Barrès; Philippe Barrès
- Military career
- Allegiance: France
- Branch: French Army
- Service years: 1943–1959
- Rank: Captain
- Commands: 5th Company, 9e RCP
- Conflicts: World War II; First Indochina War; Korean War; Algerian War
- Awards: Commander of the Légion d’honneur Médaille militaire Croix de guerre 1939-1945

Claude Henri Maurice Barrès (22 March 1925 – 26 May 1959) was a decorated French Army officer who served in World War II, the First Indochina War, the Korean War and the Algerian War. He was the grandson of author Maurice Barrès and son of journalist Philippe Barrès.

== Biography ==
He joined the Free French Forces in England during World War II at the age of seventeen as a paratrooper in the SAS. He then fought in the First Indochina War, Korean War and Algerian War. He was killed while leading his company, the 5th Company of the 9th Parachute Chasseur Regiment, at Djebel Harraba near the Algerian-Tunisian border.

== Decorations ==
- Commander of the Légion d’honneur
- Médaille militaire
- Croix de guerre 1939-1945 with palm

He received thirteen citations during his career.
