= Louis Galau =

French anarchist (1840-1924)

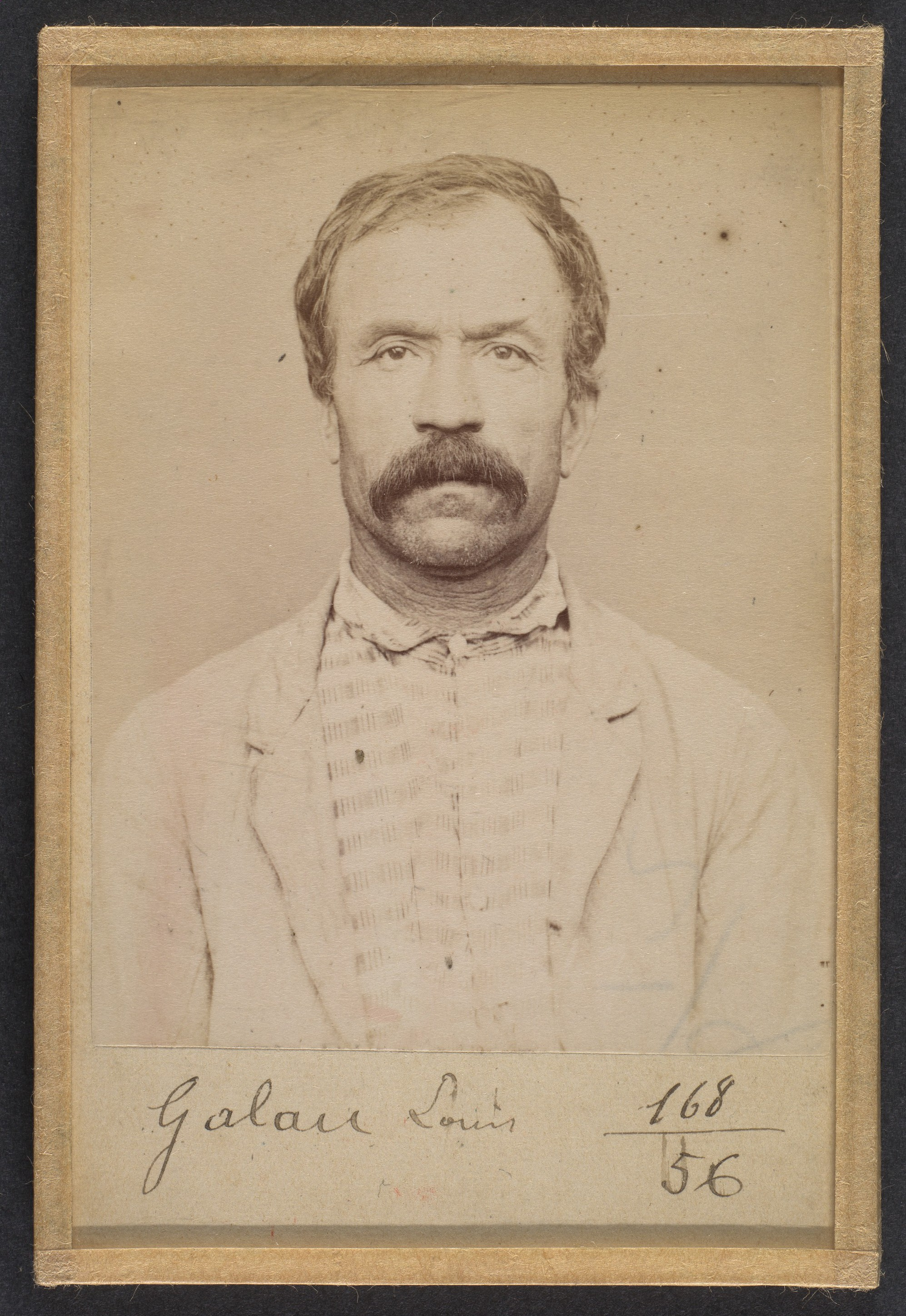
- Louis Galau's mugshot taken by Alphonse Bertillon (Anthropometric File of Anarchists - 1893)
- Born: 8 August 1840; Mouzieys-Panens, France
- Died: 31 January 1924 (aged 83); Paris, France
- Citizenship: France
- Occupations: cartwright anarchist
- Movement: Anarchism

Louis Galau, born 8 August 1840 in Mouzieys-Panens and died 31 January 1924 in Paris, was a French cartwright and anarchist. He is best known for his importance within the anarchist movement in France and for being considered one of France's 'most dangerous' anarchists during the period known as the Ère des attentats (1892-1894).

Born in the Tarn department, Galau joined anarchist groups in Saint-Ouen and the northern suburbs of Paris during the Belle Époque. He became close to a number of anarchists, such as Charles 'Cookie' Simon, and met Ravachol in Saint-Denis before the start of his bombings, which launched the period known as the Ère des attentats. With his family and seven children, Galau was a leading figure in the anarchist movement in France during this time. He was targeted by numerous arrests and raids, which were usually unsuccessful or insufficient to secure a conviction. In 1894, he was accused of participating in the opening of a safe supplied to him by the illegalists Alfred and Émile Spannagel. He was held in pre-trial detention for seven months before being acquitted. He generally avoided any heavy sentences, was sentenced to three months in prison in 1906 for heckling soldiers, and later sought to reconnect with some of his sons. He died in Paris in 1924.

His police mugshot is part of the collections of the Metropolitan Museum of Art (MET).

== Biography ==
Louis Galau was born on 8 August 1840 in Mouzieys-Panens, in the Tarn department. He later moved to the northern suburbs of Paris, specifically Saint-Ouen, and became involved in the anarchist movement. Anarchist groups in these suburbs were known for having a large working-class base and a notable radicalism, with young anarchists often supporting methods such as individual reclamation and propaganda by the deed.

In 1892, Galau and his son, Charles, attended meetings of the International Anarchist Group. The two were closely associated with other anarchists like Charles 'Cookie' Simon and Gustave Mathieu. Louis Galau also personally knew Ravachol, a prominent anarchist, who passed through Saint-Denis before beginning a series of bombings.

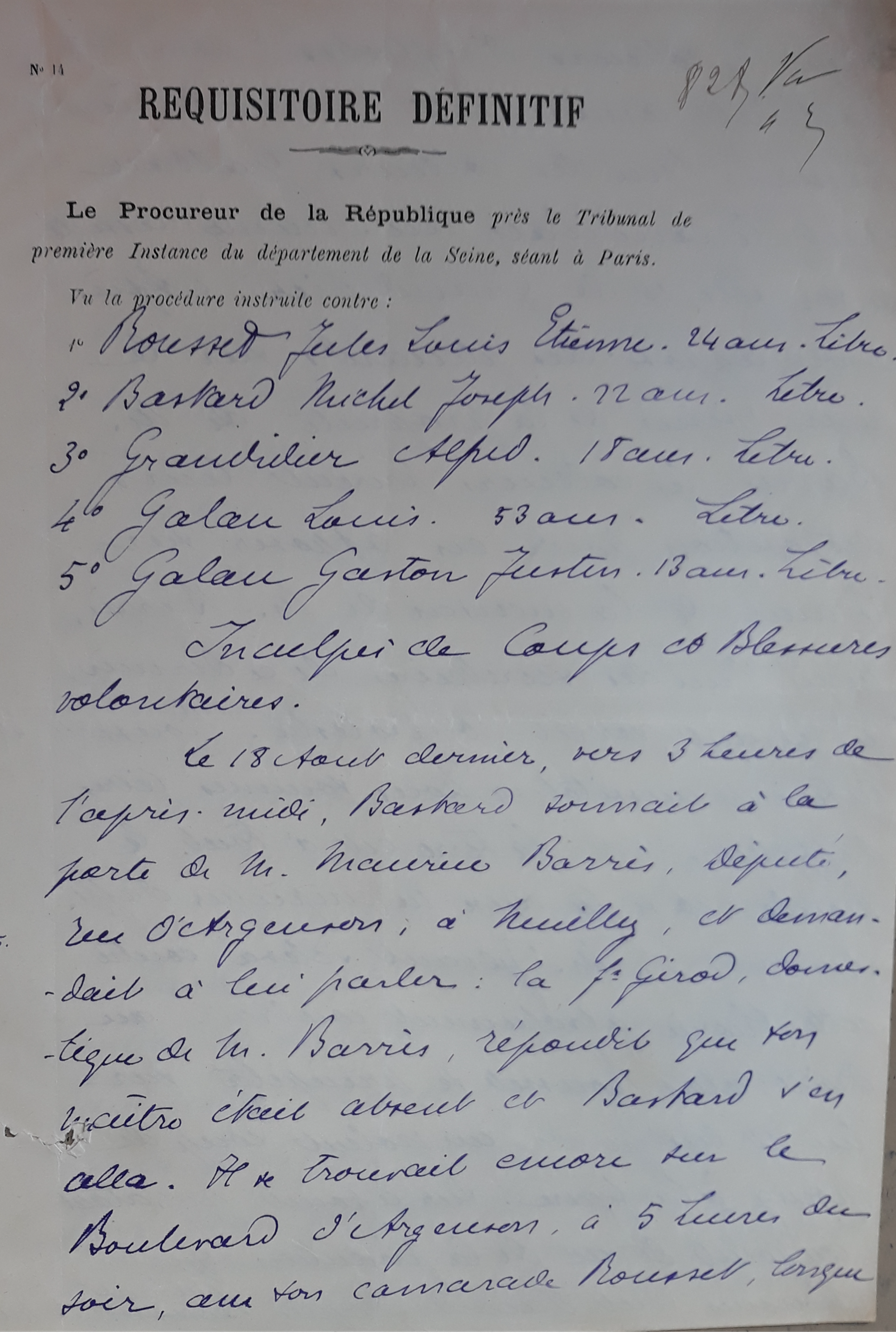
French authorities asking for the arrest of Bastard, Roussel, Galau (both), etc for attacking Maurice Barrès's home (courtesy of Archives anarchistes)

When Ravachol's group began their attacks, targeting individuals like Edmond Benoît, Galau was placed on a list of fifty anarchists considered the country's 'most dangerous'. On 22 April 1892, Galau and his son were subjected to an unsuccessful police raid and were arrested for association with the criminal group responsible for the attacks. He spent two weeks in prison before being released. Galau claimed to be an anarchist but not a member of any specific group.

The following year, Galau was still suspected of participating in bombings and was raided in February 1893, but police found nothing. The anarchist was searched again on 30 May 1893, by around twenty police officers looking for explosive devices. The raid was also motivated by the fact that Galau housed many fellow companions to protect them, including an anarchist named Blanc, who was involved in making explosives. Galau was not home during this search, as he was taking his son to the hospital, which allowed the police to operate freely. Initially, they found nothing, but later, the officers found a bucket containing his correspondence, Charles's worker's booklet, and empty tubes, all under a three-meter-high pile of clinker. No clearly explosive objects were found at his home.

The next day, Galau wrote to the press to denounce the raid. According to him, the police conducted the raid to make evidence disappear about the violence suffered by Jean-Baptiste Foret, an anarchist who was arrested, beaten, and sentenced to death. Foret had allegedly recovered his blood-stained clothing and could have used it as evidence against the police in a potential trial. Galau wrote:

What the police were probably looking for in this raid was the blood-stained linen of Foret, condemned to death, his shirt that he sent me from the [prison] where the traces of the saber blows he received at the station are evident—they wanted to make the incriminating evidence disappear. Foret, dragged to the station by the merchants who had arrested him, not wanting to give his name, was tied with his hands behind his back and atrociously beaten by the agents, with punches and saber blows while one of them held him by his sexual parts. He recounted these facts to the court, which did not take them into account.

The anarchist also stated he was ready to go to Judge Athalin to demand the return of the clothes of his seven children, which had been taken by the police. He was arrested the day after his statement appeared in the press. A few days later, Galau published a denial in the press that his son was a fugitive. At the time, his son was involved in Foret's trial but was not under arrest.

Together with Henri Étiévant and others, he organized a meeting in Saint-Ouen on 25 June 1893 to protest the death sentence of Foret.

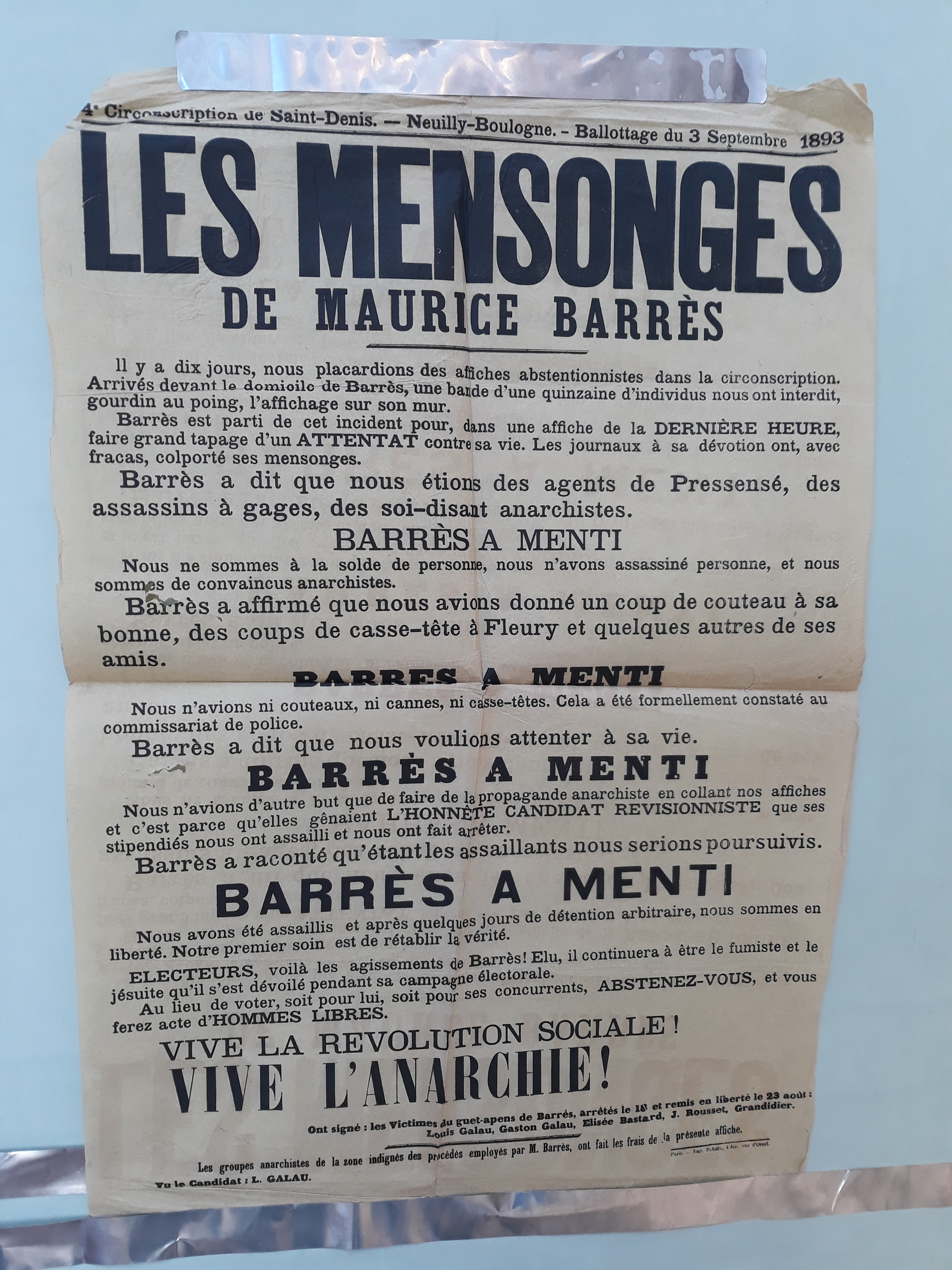
'The lies of Maurice Barrès' - Answer to the police complaint by Louis Galau and his group (courtesy of Archives anarchistes)

The following month, while running as an abstentionist candidate in the legislative elections, his son Gaston Galau was with a group of other anarchists, including Élisée Bastard, who was also an abstentionist candidate. The group went to the private mansion occupied by Maurice Barrès, a figure of the French far-right, and decided to put up posters and demand 'reparation by arms', meaning a duel, because one of the politician's posters had allegedly insulted them. When Barrès' servants came to remove the posters, they were reportedly beaten violently by the anarchists with their paste brushes and possibly a knife, though the latter point is uncertain. Gaston Galau was arrested, and his father, who was a signatory of the Le Père Peinard au populo posters that the group put up, was arrested with him. The anarchist complained that he was arrested just before the elections, which prevented him from campaigning, and asked to be released.

He was arrested during the repression of early 1894 for criminal conspiracy and remained in pre-trial detention for more than three months before being released without charges. One of his sons and his entire immediate family were arrested on 1 July 1894. Galau was arrested again on 30 November 1894, this time for a more serious matter, along with his children Gaston, Marguerite, and Maurice. They were all accused of participating in numerous burglaries. He was also accused of having been the manager of the newspaper Le Père Peinard, which turned out to be false. Galau was accused of helping the illegalists Alfred and Émile Spannagel., who had allegedly brought a safe from a burglary to his home. Galau was said to have broken it open and then thrown the safe into the Seine, the river flowing in Paris.

Galau was held in pre-trial detention for seven months while awaiting his trial. He was acquitted, while Spannagel was sentenced to life deportation to a penal colony.

In the following years, Galau's daughters and sons were noted in London and traveled between the two countries. In 1897, his son Maurice died from injuries after being beaten by the police, according to Le Père Peinard. Galau welcomed the partner of Henri Decamps and their nine-year-old daughter into his home the same year, as Jules Chauveau, who had been housing and caring for them, had died. Decamps was in prison following the Clichy affair.

=== Later years and death ===
In 1906, Galau was arrested after he had heckled soldiers guarding a depot. He was sentenced to three months in prison and a 100-franc fine for antimilitarist propaganda and insults. After his release from prison, he took a walk in the countryside with 300 companions from the northern suburbs. In 1912, he tried to find some of his sons and wrote in Le Libertaire:

Comrade Louis Galau asks for the address of his two sons, who are currently in North America. Comrade Grenier, who came to see me, knows this address. I would be obliged if he would transmit it to Le Libertaire.

Louis Galau died on 31 January 1924 in Paris.

== Legacy ==
=== Police mugshot ===
His police mugshot is part of the collections of the Metropolitan Museum of Art (MET).

== Bibliography ==
- Bouhey, Vivien (2008), Les Anarchistes contre la République [The Anarchists against the Republic] (in French), Rennes: Presses universitaires de Rennes (PUR)
- Petit, Dominique (2024), GALAU Louis, Paris: Le Maitron
- Dupuy, Rolf (2025), "GALAU (ou GALLAU), Louis", Dictionnaire international des militants anarchistes, Paris
