= Paris-Presse =

Paris Presse
- Type: Daily newspaper
- Format: Broadsheet
- Founded: 1944
- Ceased publication: 1970
- Language: French
- Country: France

Paris-Presse was a French newspaper published in Paris between 1944 and 1970, which was created by Philippe Barres (1896–1975) and Ève Curie (1904–2007), the daughter of Marie Curie, who both ran the newspaper until 1949.

== History ==
The first issue appeared on 13 November 1944. It stood in second place behind France Soir. It became the Paris-Presse-Intransigeant in 1948, and Gaston Bonheur became its editor. In 1951, suffering from competition with France Soir, it turned around under the leadership of Max Corre. In 1965, it was no longer an edition of France Soir. It lost many of its writers (including Gilbert Guilleminault L'Aurore, Philippe Bernert, Anne Manson), then it was absorbed by France Soir.

== Journalists ==
- Marcel Haedrich (1913–2003)
- Guilleminault Gilbert (1914–1990)
- Albert Ollivier (1915–1964)
- Pierre Desgraupes (1918–1993)
- Jean Lartéguy (1920–2011)
- Maurice Bernardet (1921–2008)
- Marcel Giuglaris (1922–2010)
- Pierre Rey (1930–)
- Bernard Michal (1932–)
- Kléber Haedens (1954–)
- Gérard de Villiers (1929–2013)
- Jean Vermorel (1935–)
