= Le Voyage de Sparte =

1906 book by Maurice Barrès

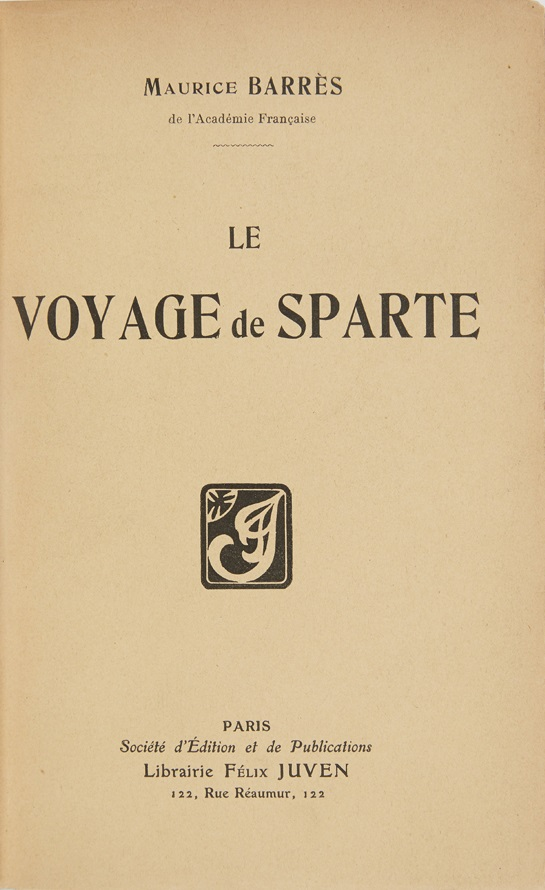
- Author: Maurice Barrès
- Language: French
- Genre: travel literature
- Publisher: Félix Juven
- Publication date: 1906
- Publication place: France
- Pages: 300

Le Voyage de Sparte (lit. 'The Journey to Sparta') is a 1906 book by the French writer Maurice Barrès. It is based on Barrès' travels in Greece from 19 April to 25 May 1900. It gathers Barrès' impressions from Athens to Olympia, with his positive assessment of Sparta as the centre of the travel narrative.
