= Philippe Barrès =

French journalist (1896–1975)

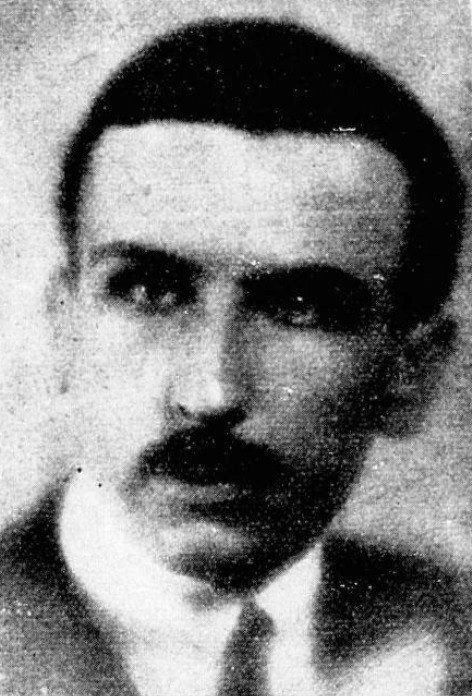
Barrès, Philippe Auguste.jpg

Philippe Barrès (8 July 1896, Neuilly-sur-Seine, Hauts-de-Seine – 14 April 1975) was a French journalist and the son of Maurice Barrès.

He fought in World War I. He was a member of the editorial staff of the right-wing newspaper Le Nouveau siècle founded on 26 February 1925, along with Georges Valois, Jacques Arthuys and Hubert Bourgin. He was a member of the short-lived Fascist party the Faisceau in the late 1920s. During World War II, he lived in the United States and wrote for French language journals. He represented the Rally of the French People (RPF) in the National Assembly from 1951 to 1955. His son Claude Barrès joined the Free French Forces.

== Biography ==
The son of a champion of nationalism, Philippe Barrès enlisted at the age of 18 in the 12th Cuirassier Regiment (France) to take part in the First World War I, before joining the 1st battalion of chasseurs à pied. At the end of the conflict, he was cited three times, awarded the Croix de Guerre 1914-1918 and made a Chevalier de la Legion of Honour. He headed the fascist group Le Faisceau for a time in the 1920s, and was also a contributing editor to the daily Le Nouveau Siècle.

In 1932, he was a correspondent in Germany for Le Matin (France), before becoming one of its editors-in-chief from 1935. In September 1938, he resigned and subsequently held a similar position at Paris-soir.

Barrès was mobilized in 1939, then assigned to the Grand Quartier Général in February 1940. He had always been hostile to National Socialism, as evidenced by his book Sous la vague hitlérienne (Under the Hitler Wave), but in June 1940 he placed himself at the service of Free France, and in 1941, while in exile in New York, he wrote the first biography of Charles de Gaulle.

Back in France, in October 1944 he founded the newspaper Paris-Presse with Ève Curie, and from 1949 he worked for Le Figaro and then for L'information financière. A political activist, he was elected deputy for Meurthe-et-Moselle on the RPF ticket in 1951, focusing mainly on foreign affairs. At the end of his term, he lost interest in political life; however, in 1958, General de Gaulle became President of the Republic, and Philippe Barrès decided to get involved again, becoming a Union for the New Republic affiliated town councillor from 1959 to 1962.

== Books ==
- La guerre à vingt ans – Plon, 1924
- Ainsi que l'Albatros Novel – Plon, 1931
- La Victoire au dernier tournant – Plon, 1931
- Sous la vague hitlérienne – Plon, 1934
- They speak for a nation Lettres from Frenchmen published in América – Doubleday Doran, New-York, 1941
- Charles de Gaulle. – Plon, 1941
- Sauvons nos prisonniers – Didier, New-York, 1942
