= The Cult of the Self =

Book trilogy by French author Maurice Barrès

Sous l'Œil des Barbares (1888)

Un Homme Libre (1889)

Le Jardin de Bérénice (1891)

The Cult of the Self (French: Le Culte du moi) is a trilogy of books by French author Maurice Barrès, sometimes called his trilogie du moi. The trilogy was influenced by Romanticism, and it also made an apology of the pleasure of the senses.

== Background ==
Barrès wrote the works while living in Italy. The first book, Under the Eyes of the Barbarians, (Sous l'œil des barbares) was published in 1888. The second work, A Free Man, (Un Homme libre), was published in 1889. The final book, The Garden of Berenice (Le Jardin de Bérénice), was published in 1891.
