= Les Déracinés =

1897 novel by Maurice Barrès

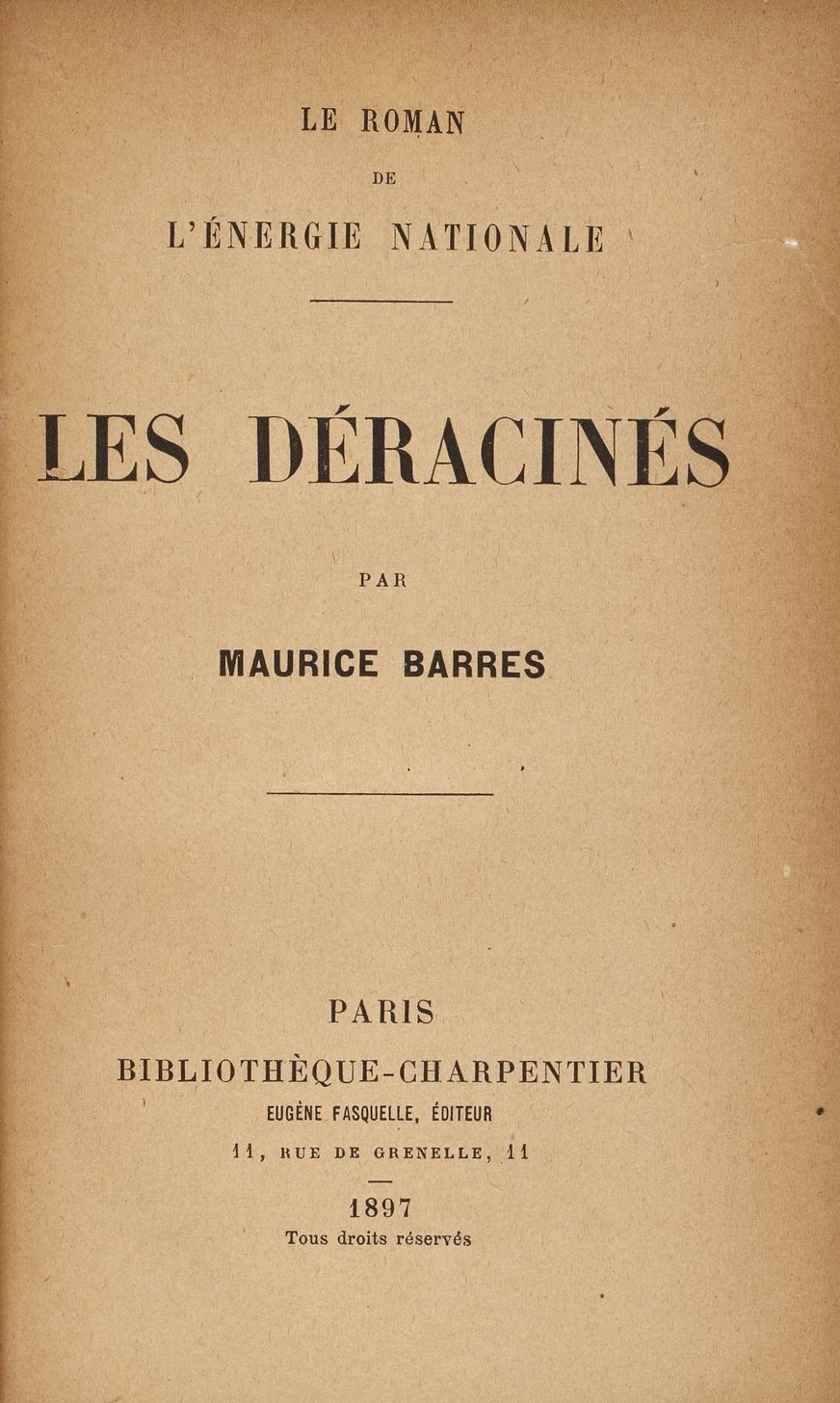
- Author: Maurice Barrès
- Language: French
- Publisher: Charpentier
- Publication date: 1897
- Publication place: France
- Pages: 497

Les Déracinés (lit. 'The Uprooted') is an 1897 novel by the French writer Maurice Barrès. It is about a group of young men from Nancy who try to make careers in Paris, inspired by and to varying degrees disappointed by their former philosophy teacher, a man strongly devoted to the French Third Republic.

It is the first novel in Barrès' trilogy Le Roman de l'énergie nationale (lit. 'The Novel of National Energy'). It was followed by L'Appel au soldat (1900) and Leurs figures (1902).
