= Louis Léveillé =

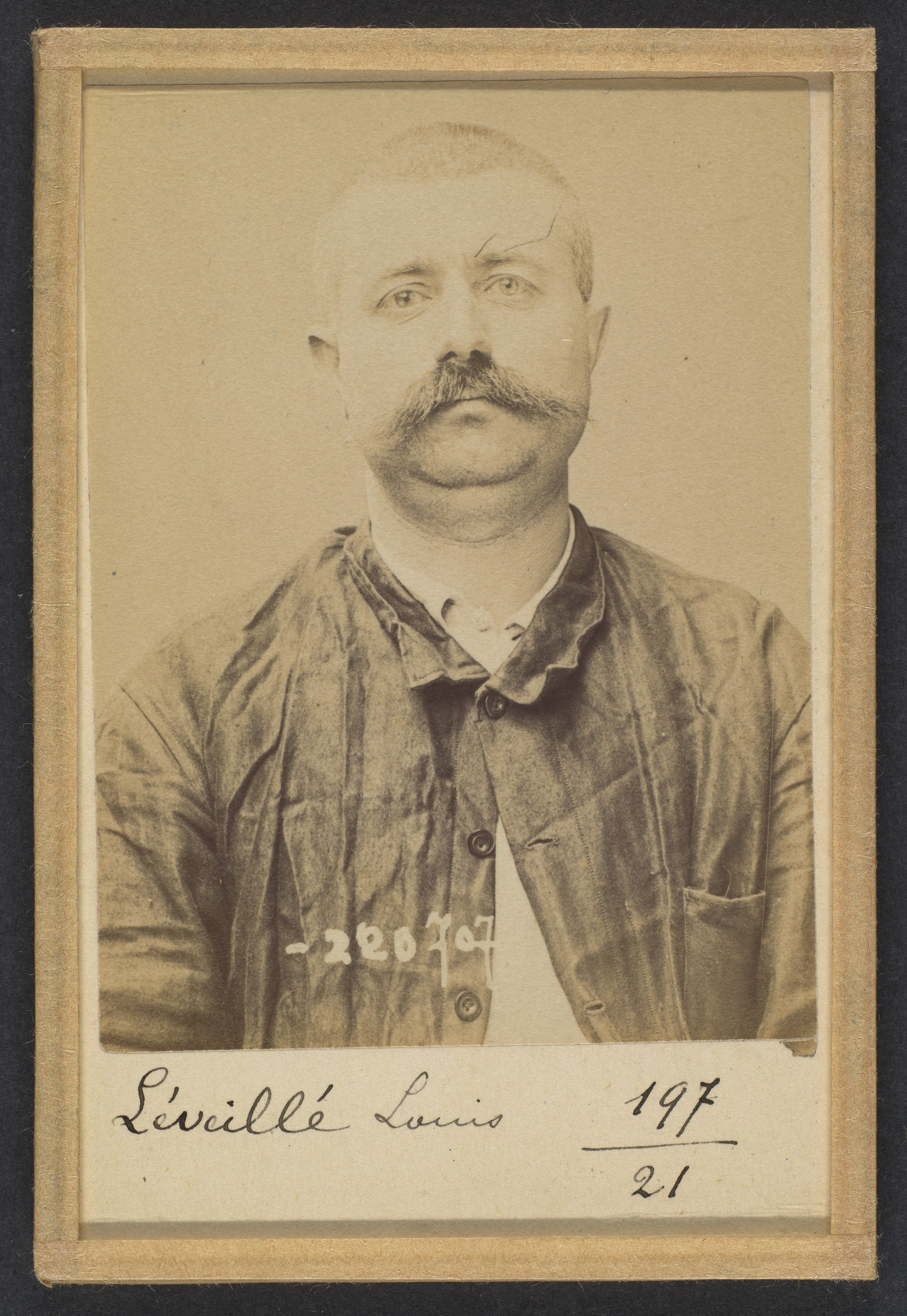
- Léveillé's mugshot taken by Alphonse Bertillon in 1894
- Born: July 29, 1857; Clichy, France
- Died: December 15, 1927; Lyon, France
- Citizenship: France
- Occupations: locksmith anarchist
- Known for: Being one of the victims of the Clichy affair
- Movement: Anarchism

Louis Léveillé (1857-1927), nicknamed 'Chasseur' ('Hunter') among others, was a French locksmith and anarchist. He is primarily known for being one of the victims of the Clichy affair, a case of police brutality that contributed to the start of the Ère des attentats (1892-1894).

Léveillé was born in Clichy and associated with anarchist groups. He married a first partner, whom he beat. A few years later, in 1891, he became one of the victims of the Clichy affair when police shot him during a peaceful demonstration. Following his arrest, he was beaten and denied treatment for his gunshot wounds. During his trial, the prosecutor sought the death penalty for him. Acquitted, he subsequently became involved in anarchist networks in France, traveled frequently, and was arrested numerous times.

His police photograph is part of the Metropolitan Museum of Art (MET) collections.

== Biography ==
=== Early life and domestic violence ===
Louis Léveillé was born on 29 July 1857, in Clichy, France. His parents, Désirée Lizon and Jules Antoine Léveillé, both worked as gardeners. Léveillé himself became a locksmith.

In the early 1880s, he gained notice for attending meetings of the La Solidarité group in Levallois-Perret. In 1881, Léveillé married Marguerite Émilie Gauthier. Their relationship was marked by his violence towards her; he repeatedly struck and beat her. For instance, in August 1884, he kicked her in the stomach while she was pregnant. He also threatened her life. In 1889, Gauthier requested him a divorce, which Léveillé sought.

=== Clichy affair and Ère des attentats (1892-1894) ===
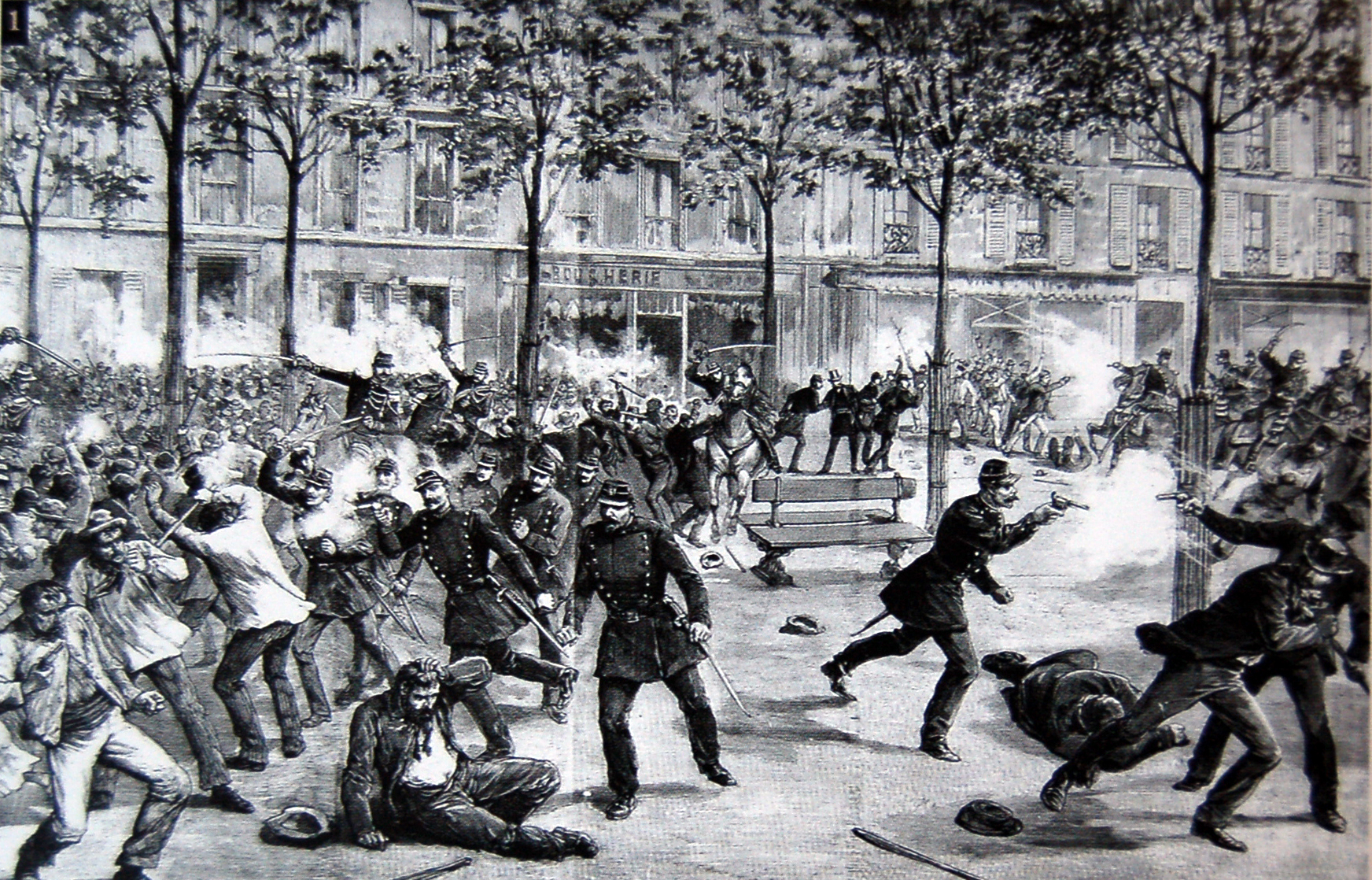
Clichy affair

During the Workers' Day celebration on 1 May 1891, a small group of about twenty anarchists gathered in Levallois-Perret. Led by a group member carrying a red flag, they began a peaceful demonstration intended to end in Clichy. The police commissaire of Levallois-Perret, informed of this demonstration in his district, decided to pursue them with his officers. Meanwhile, the commissaire of Clichy, into whose jurisdiction they had just entered, decided not to intervene, considering that the flag posed no danger and that the anarchists were withdrawing to a wine merchant's, thus ceasing the demonstration.

Meanwhile, the police commissaire of Levallois-Perret, having entered his colleague's jurisdiction, decided to seize the red flag from the wine merchant's. Police officers entered, and as they tried to grab the flag, shots were fired, pushing everyone outside. There, mounted gendarmes rushed in and began shooting at the demonstrators.

Three anarchists—Charles Dardare, Henri Decamps, and Léveillé—couldn't escape and were arrested before being taken to the station. There, all three were beaten by the police. Léveillé was shot in the leg, and the police provided no care for his wound for several days; he managed to prevent the wound from becoming infected.

On 28 August 1891, all three were brought to trial on charges of "voluntary assault resulting in bloodshed against public officers", with prosecutor Léon Bulot seeking the death penalty. They defended themselves by stating that while they were indeed anarchists, they had only defended themselves as best they could. He declared:

I shall not attempt to provoke your indignation by recounting the treatment we endured. Let it suffice, Messieurs, that with my thigh pierced by a bullet, devoured by fever and suffering cruel pain, when I asked for water, I was answered with blows from boots and rifle butts. Let it suffice for you to recall that this painful agony lasted six times 24 days, and that I remained without care until the 20th of May — that is to say, for 20 days. However, Messieurs, in wartime, even when the fiercest interests run unchecked, it is an absolute rule that the wounded who fall into the hands of the enemy must be cared for and prisoners respected. But to policemen, we are more than enemies — because we are revolutionaries, anarchists.

Léveillé, the only one of the three without a criminal record, was acquitted, while the other two received severe sentences of three and five years of strict imprisonment.

This event deeply shocked anarchists and motivated many of them, such as Ravachol, to avenge the three victims. This pushed France into what French public opinion called the Ère des attentats (1892-1894).

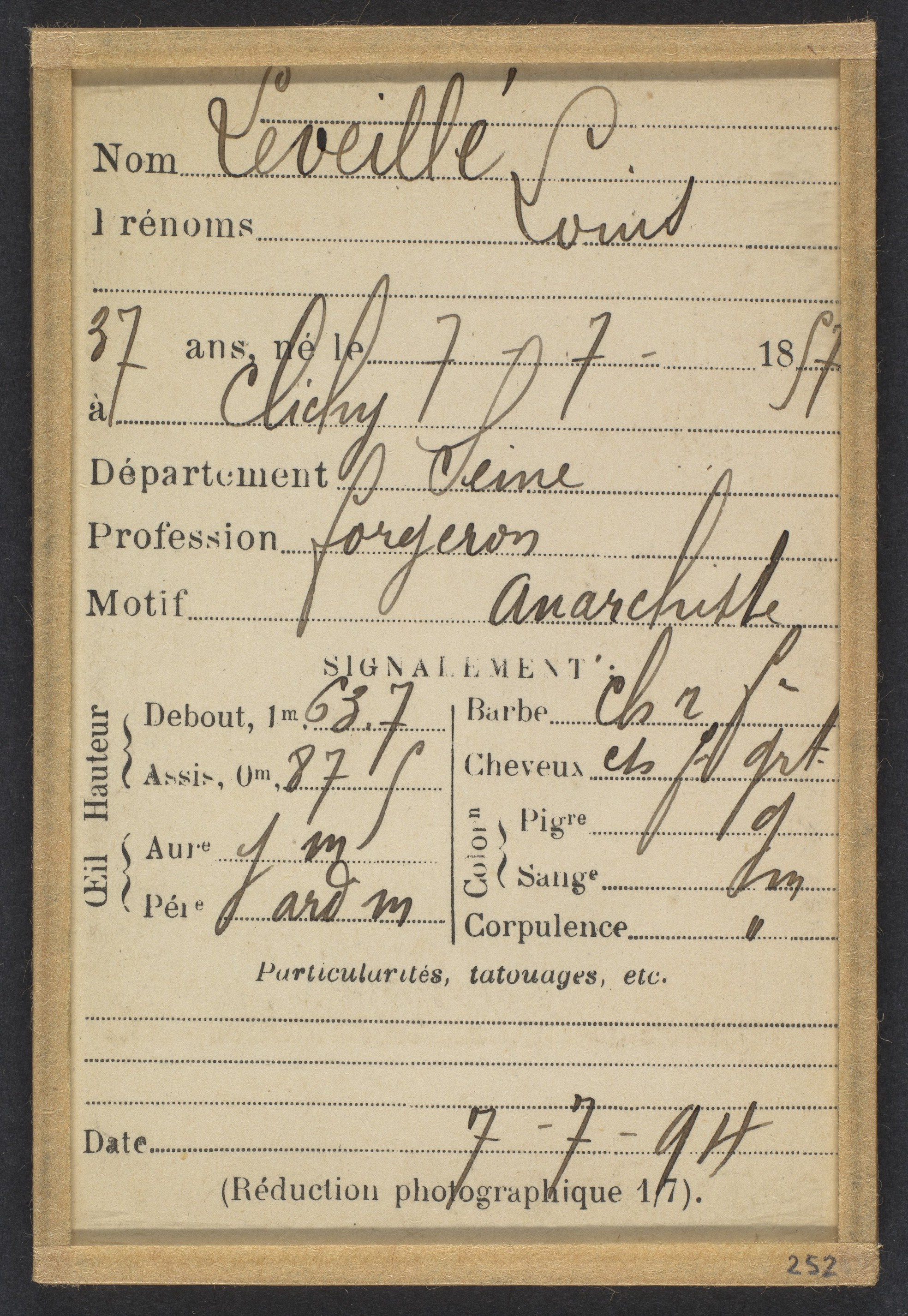
File on Léveillé by Alphonse Bertillon (1894)

Following a terrorist act of such a nature targeting the Clichy police station, he was arrested on 15 January 1892 after boasting about starting fires in Clichy, but he was acquitted. In April, he was "preventively" arrested, like many anarchists, in anticipation of 1 May, before being released. He was arrested again on 22 August 1892 for affiliation with a criminal association and acquitted once more.

He associated with other anarchists from Levallois-Perret and Clichy within a group, particularly Émile Spannagel and Victor Vinchon. This group was arrested in May 1893 after dozens of bombs were discovered in a garden in Levallois-Perret; all were acquitted except for Vinchon. During this period, Léveillé lived with the anarchist activist Berthe Moreau.

=== Later years and death ===
On 6 July 1894, he was again arrested for criminal association but acquitted. The following year, after a theft in which Spannagel was involved, Léveillé fled to London. According to French police informants in London, he allegedly received 500 francs from unknown sources in Paris to help him escape to Argentina. However, he spent some of his money and decided to take a boat from Antwerp instead, before an expulsion order was issued against him in Belgium.

Léveillé then returned to London, was arrested, and extradited to France, where he was sentenced to twenty years of deportation to a penal colony, but he was ultimately acquitted. He then left Paris to work as a locksmith in Champagne and Yonne. In Reims, he associated with anarchist groups.

The anarchist traveled throughout France during this period, settling for a time in Lyon, where the police couldn't locate his residence. He then left, only to return to Lyon. There, in 1914, he married Célestine Masino, his partner of twenty-one years his junior, with whom he had been living since 1906. Léveillé recognized her four children born before 1906.

He died in Lyon on 15 December 1927.

== Legacy ==
=== Police mugshots ===
His police mugshot is part of the collections of the Metropolitan Museum of Art (MET).

== Bibliography ==
- Bouhey, Vivien (2008), Les Anarchistes contre la République [The Anarchists against the Republic] (in French), Rennes: Presses universitaires de Rennes (PUR)
- Dupuy, Rolf; Davranche, Guillaume; Petit, Dominique (2024), LÉVEILLÉ Louis, Paris: Le Maitron
- Dupuy, Rolf (2025), "LEVEILLE, Louis "BERTRAND" ; "CHASSEUR" ; "MOREAU"", Dictionnaire international des militants anarchistes, Paris
- Goron, Marie-François (1903), Les Mémoires de M. Goron, vol. 4, Paris: Flammarion
- Merriman, John M. (2016). The dynamite club: how a bombing in fin-de-siècle Paris ignited the age of modern terror. Yale University Press. ISBN 978-0-300-21792-6.
