= Maurice Barrès =

French novelist and philosopher (1862–1923)

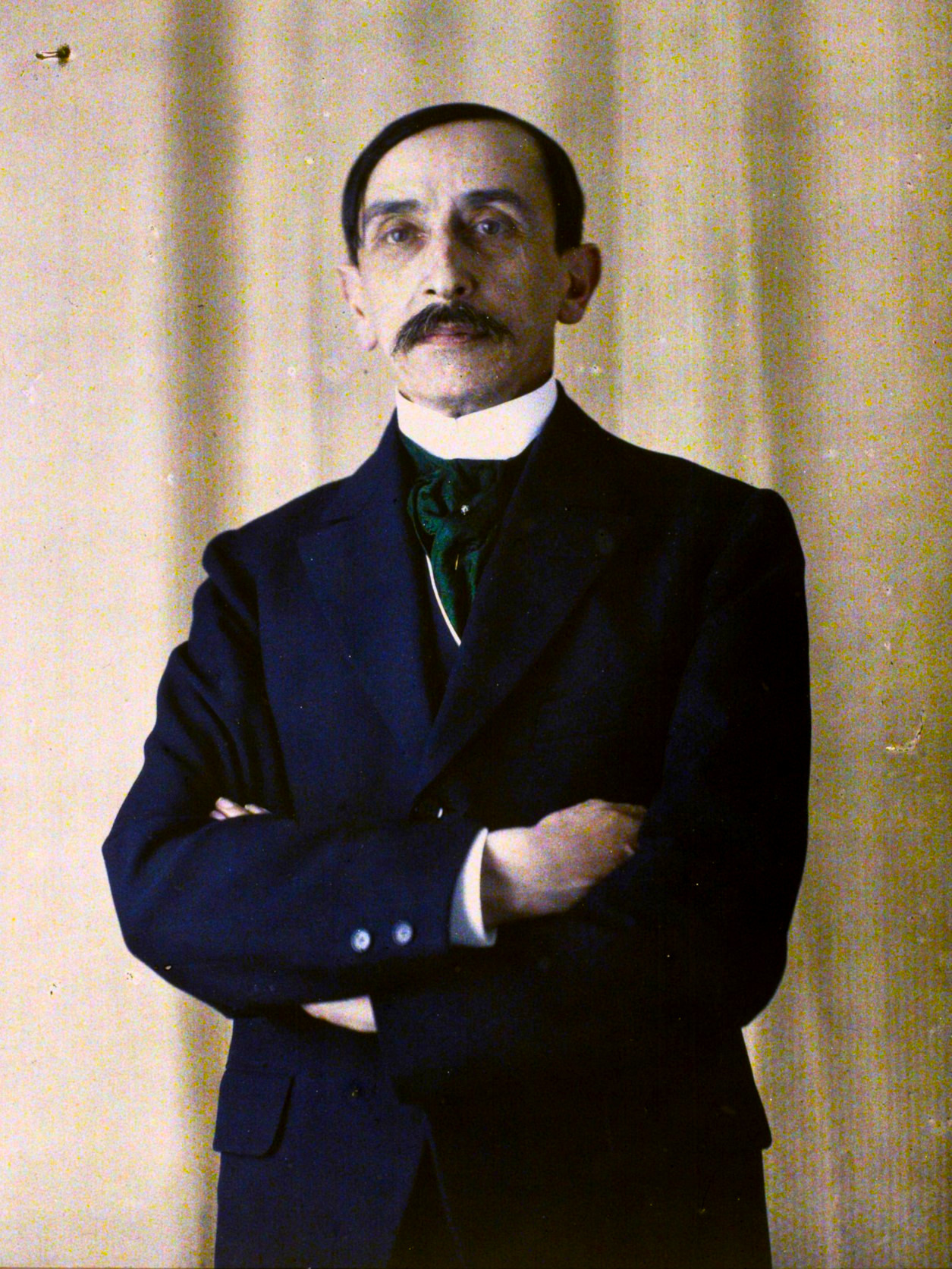
- Autochrome of Barrès, 1918
- Born: Auguste-Maurice Barrès; 19 August 1862; Charmes, Vosges, France
- Died: 4 December 1923 (aged 61); Neuilly-sur-Seine, Seine, France
- Resting place: Charmes, Vosges
- Occupations: Journalist; novelist; politician
- Writing career
- Movements: Symbolism; Nationalism

Auguste-Maurice Barrès (French: [oɡyst mɔʁis baʁɛs]; 19 August 1862 – 4 December 1923) was an anti-Semitic French novelist, journalist, philosopher, and politician. Spending some time in Italy, he became a figure in French literature with the release of his work The Cult of the Self in 1888. He was elected a member of the Académie Française in 1906.

In politics, Barrès was first elected to the Chamber of Deputies in 1889 as a Boulangist and would play a prominent political role for the rest of his life. He presided over the Ligue des Patriotes from 1914 until his death in 1923.

== Biography ==
Barrès was associated in his literary works with Symbolism, a movement which had equivalence with British Aestheticism and Italian Decadentism; indeed he was a close associate of Gabriele d'Annunzio representing the latter. As the name of his trilogy suggests, his works glorified a humanistic love of the self and he also flirted with occult mysticisms in his youth. The Dreyfus affair saw an ideological shift from a liberal individualism rooted in the French Revolution to a more organic and traditional concept of the nation. He also became a leading anti-Dreyfusard popularising the term nationalisme to describe his views. He stood on a platform of "Nationalism and Protectionism.".

Politically, he became involved with various groups such as the Ligue des Patriotes of Paul Déroulède, of which he became the leader in 1914. Barrès was close to Charles Maurras, founder of the monarchist party Action Française. Though he remained a republican, Barrès developed a strong influence on various French monarchists of his day, as well as various other figures. During the First World War, he championed the Union Sacrée political truce. In later life, Barrès returned to the Catholic faith: he was involved in a campaign to restore French church buildings and helped establish 24 June as a national day of remembrance for St. Joan of Arc.

=== Early years ===
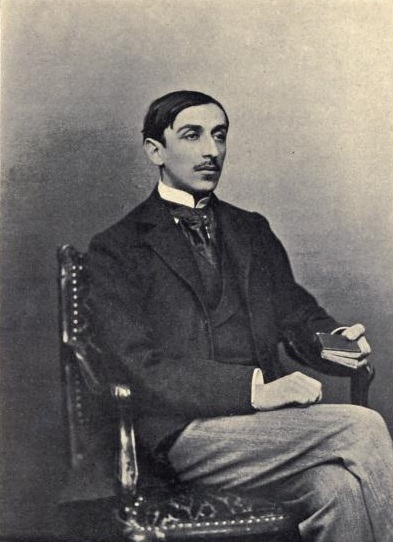
Portrait of a young Maurice Barrès

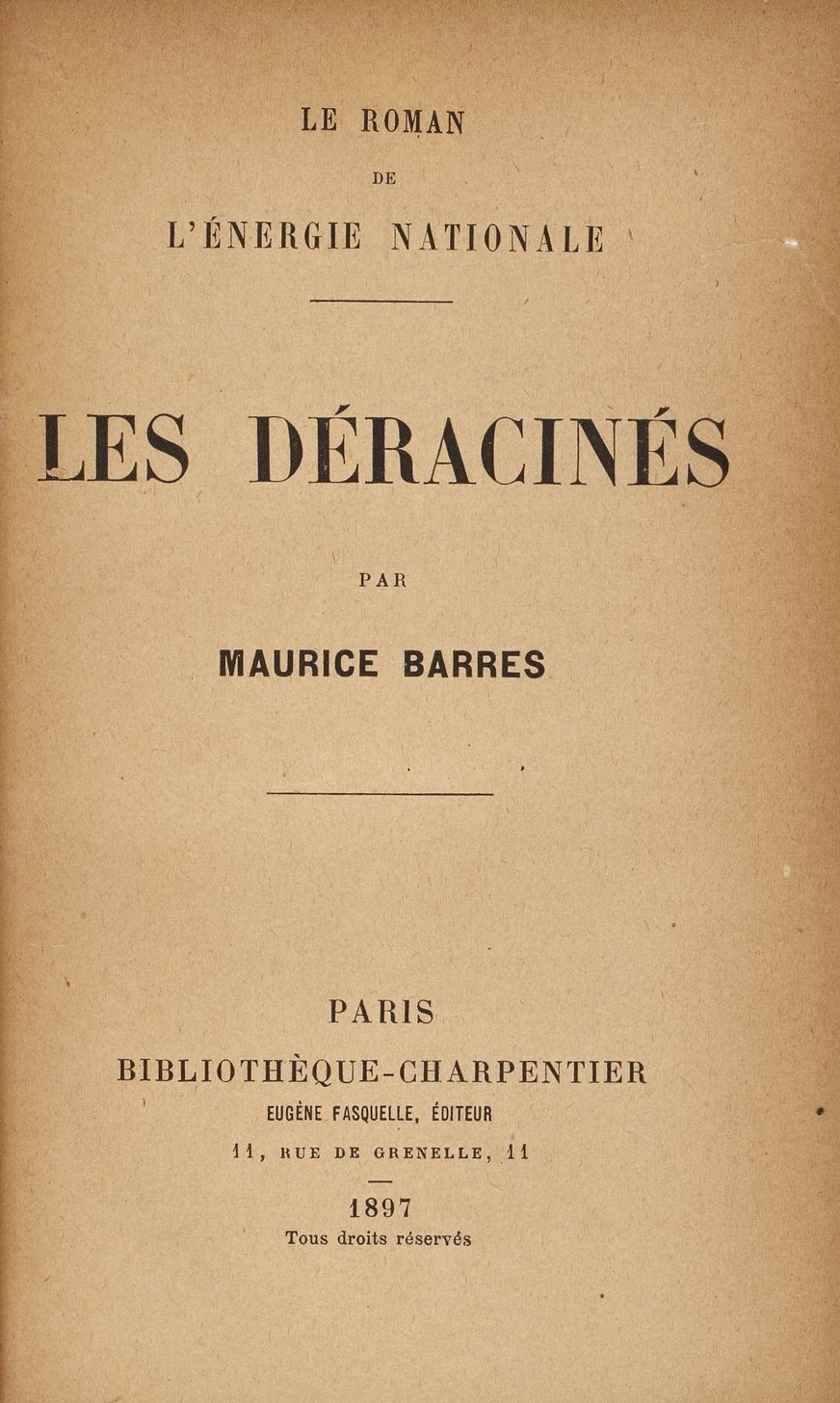
Les Déracinés, published in 1897

Born at Charmes, Vosges, he received his secondary education at the lycée of Nancy, attending there the lessons of Auguste Burdeau, later pictured as social climber Paul Bouteiller in Les Déracinés. In 1883 continued his legal studies in Paris. Establishing himself at first in the Quartier Latin, he became acquainted with Leconte de Lisle's cenacle and with the symbolists in the 1880s, even meeting Victor Hugo once. He had already started contributing to the monthly periodical, Jeune France (Young France), and he now issued a periodical of his own, Les Taches d'encre, which survived for only a few months. After four years of journalism he settled in Italy, where he wrote Sous l'œil des barbares (1888), the first volume of a trilogie du moi (also called Le Culte du moi or The Cult of the Self), completed by Un Homme libre (1889), and Le Jardin de Bérénice (1891). The Cult of the Self trilogy was influenced by Romanticism, and also made an apology of the pleasure of the senses.

He supplemented these apologies for his narcissism with L'Ennemi des lois (1892), and with a volume of impressions of travel, Du sang, de la volupté, de la mort (1893). Barrès wrote his early books in an elaborate and often very obscure style.

The Comédie Française produced his play Une Journée parlementaire in 1894. A year after establishing himself in Neuilly, he began his trilogy in 1897, Le Roman de l'énergie nationale (Novel of the National Energy), with the publication of Les Déracinés. In this second major trilogy, he superated his early individualism with a patriotic fidelity to the fatherland and an organicist conception of the nation. Affected by the Dreyfus Affair, and finding himself on the side of the Anti-Dreyfusards, Barrès played a leading role alongside Charles Maurras, which initiated his shift to the political right; Barrès oriented himself towards a lyrical form of nationalism, founded on the cult of the earth and the dead ("la terre et les morts", "earth and the dead"—see below for details).

The Roman de l'énergie nationale trilogy makes a plea for local patriotism, militarism, the faith to one's roots and to one's family, and for the preservation of the distinctive qualities of the old French provinces. Les Déracinés narrates the adventures of seven young Lorrainers who set out to conquer fortune in Paris. Six of them survive in the second novel of the trilogy, L'Appel au soldat (1900), which gives the history of Boulangism; the sequel, Leurs figures (1902), deals with the Panama scandals. Later works include:

- Scènes et doctrines du nationalisme (1902)
- Les Amitiés françaises (1903), in which he urges the inculcation of patriotism by the early study of national history
- Ce que j'ai vu à Rennes (1904)
- Le Voyage de Sparte (1906).

He presented himself in 1905 to the Académie Française, but was supplanted by Etienne Lamy. He then tried again, but inclined himself before the candidacy of the former Minister Alexandre Ribot. He was elected the next year, gaining 25 voices against 8 to Edmond Hauraucourt and one to Jean Aicart on 25 January 1906.

Barrès was also a friend since his youth of the occultist Stanislas de Guaita, and was attracted by Asia, sufism and shi'ism. But he returned in his later years to the Catholic faith, engaging in L'Echo de Paris a campaign in favour of the restoration of the churches of France. His son Philippe Barrès followed him in a journalism career.

=== Political activism ===
As a young man, Barrès carried his Romantic and individualist theory of the Ego into politics as an ardent partisan of General Boulanger, locating himself in the more populist side of the heterogenous Boulangist coalition. He directed a Boulangist paper at Nancy, and was elected deputy in 1889, at the age of 27, under a platform of "Nationalism, Protectionism, and Socialism", retaining his seat in the legislature until 1893, when he was defeated under the etiquette of "National Republican and Socialist" (Républicain nationaliste et socialiste). From 1889, Barrès's activism overshadowed his literary activities, although he tried to maintain both.

He shifted however to the right-wing during the Dreyfus Affair, becoming a leading mouthpiece, alongside Charles Maurras, of the Anti-Dreyfusard side. The Socialist leader Léon Blum tried to convince him to join the Dreyfusards, but Barrès refused and wrote several anti-Semitic pamphlets. He wrote, "That Dreyfus is guilty, I deduce not from the facts themselves, but from his race." Barrès's anti-Jewishness found its roots both in the scientific racial contemporary theories and on Biblical exegesis.

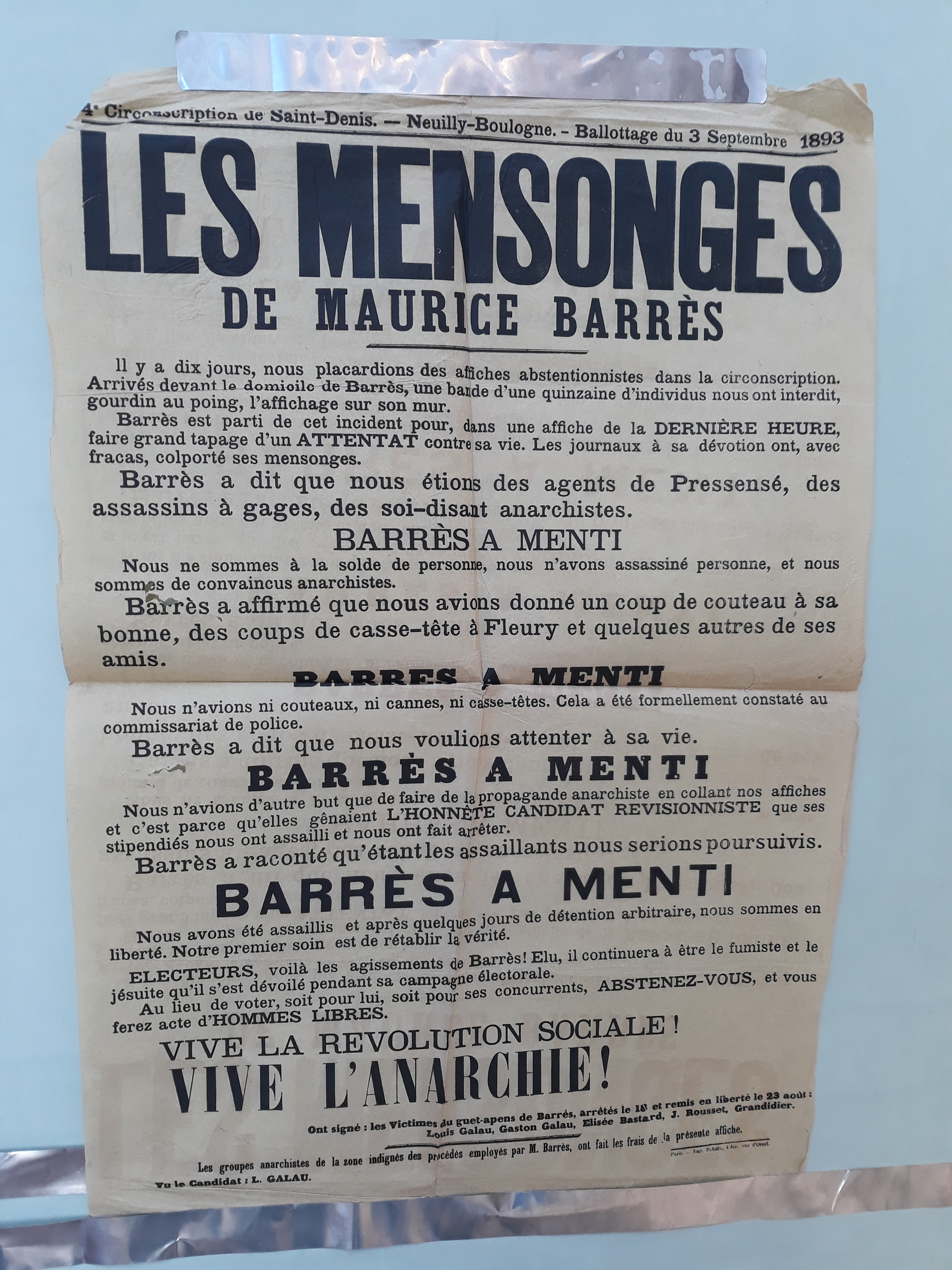
'The lies of Maurice Barrès' - Answer to the police complaint by Maurice Barrès by Louis Galau and his group (courtesy of Archives anarchistes)

In 1893, he wanted to get elected deputy in Neuilly. During this election campaign, a group of anarchist companions, including Élisée Bastard, went to his private mansion and began posting up posters supporting the candidacy of the anarchist Louis Galau. They also demanded 'reparation by arms', or a duel, so that Barrès would 'pay' for insulting them on his own campaign posters. Barrès preferred to send out his servants and did not leave his mansion. The servants and a maid went to the group of anarchists and tried to tear down the posters, but were beaten with glue brushes. The maid was reportedly stabbed in the hand by one of the anarchists, though this point is uncertain and reflects the politician's position in his complaint. Barrès filed a complaint against the anarchists, accusing them of trying to force their way into his home.

He founded the short-lived review La Cocarde (The Cockade) in 1894 (September 1894 – March 1895) to defend his ideas, attempting to bridge the gap between the far-left and the far-right. The Cocarde, nationalist, anti-parliamentarist and anti-foreign, included a diverse collection of contributors from a wide variety of backgrounds (monarchists, socialists, anarchists, Jews, Protestants), including Frédéric Amouretti, Charles Maurras, René Boylesve and Fernand Pelloutier.

He was again beaten during the 1896 elections in Neuilly, as a candidate of the Socialist leader Jean Jaurès, and then again in 1897 as a nationalist anti-Semitic candidate, having broken with the left-wing during the Dreyfus Affair.

Barrès then assumed the leadership of the Ligue de la Patrie française (League of the French Fatherland), before taking membership in the Ligue des Patriotes (Patriot League) of Paul Déroulède. In 1914, he became the leader of the Patriot League. Close to the nationalist writer Charles Maurras, founder of the monarchist Action française movement, Barrès refused however to endorse monarchist ideas, although he demonstrated sympathy throughout his life for the Action française. Most of the later monarchist theorists (Jacques Bainville, Henri Vaugeois, Léon Daudet, Henri Massis, Jacques Maritain, Georges Bernanos, Thierry Maulnier...) have recognised their debt toward Barrès, who also inspired several generations of writers (among which Montherlant, Malraux, Mauriac and Aragon).

Barrès was elected deputy of the Seine in 1906, and retained his seat until his death. He sat at that time among the Entente républicaine démocratique conservative party. In 1908, he opposed in Parliament his friend and political opponent Jean Jaurès, refusing the Socialist leader's will to Pantheonize the writer Émile Zola. Despite his political views, he was one of the first to show his respect to Jaurès' remains after his assassination on the eve of World War I.

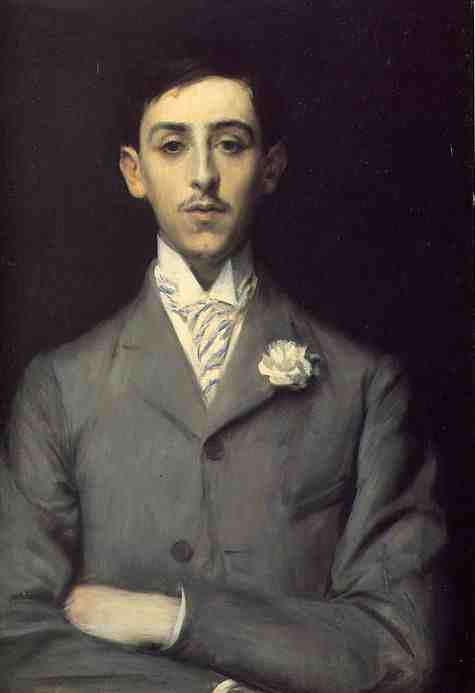
Portrait of Barrès by French artist Jacques-Émile Blanche

During World War I, Barrès was one of the proponents of the Union Sacrée, which earned him the nickname "nightingale of bloodshed" ("rossignol des carnages"). The Canard enchaîné satirical newspaper called him the "chief of the tribe of brainwashers" ("chef de la tribu des bourreurs de crâne"). His many wartime columns in L'Écho de Paris were collected in L'Âme française et la guerre (12 volumes, 1915–1920) and Chronique de la Grande Guerre (14 volumes, 1920–1924). His personal notes showed however that he himself did not always believe in his purported war optimism, being at times close to defeatism. During the war Barrès also revised his views of Jews, by paying tribute to French Jews in Les familles spirituelles de la France, where he placed them as one of the four elements of the "national genius", alongside Traditionalists, Protestants and Socialists – thus opposing himself to Maurras who placed them in the "four confederate states" of "Anti-France".

After World War I, Barrès demanded the annexation of Luxembourg into the French Republic, and also sought to increase French influence in the Rhineland. On 24 June 1920, the National Assembly adopted his draft aiming to establish a national day in remembrance of Joan of Arc.

=== Nationalism ===
Barrès is considered, alongside Charles Maurras, as one of the main thinkers of ethnic nationalism at the turn of the century in France, associated with Revanchism—the desire to reconquer the Alsace-Lorraine, annexed by the newly created German Empire at the end of the 1871 Franco-Prussian War (Barrès was aged 8 at that time). In fact, he himself popularised the word "nationalism" in French.

This has been noted by Zeev Sternhell, Michel Winock (who titled the first part of his book, Le Siècle des intellectuels, "Les Années Barrès" ("The Barrès Years"), followed by Les Années André Gide and Les Années Jean-Paul Sartre), Pierre-André Taguieff, etc. He shared as common points with Paul Bourget his disdain for utilitarianism and liberalism.

Opposed to Jean-Jacques Rousseau's theory of social contract, Barrès considered the 'Nation' (which he used to replace the 'People') as already historically founded: it did not need a "general will" to establish itself, thus also contrasting with Ernest Renan's definition of the Nation. Much closer to Herder and Fichte than to Renan in his definition of the Nation, Barrès opposed French centralism (as did Maurras), as he considered the Nation to be a multiplicity of local allegiances, first to the family, the village, the region, and ultimately to the nation-state. Barrès, for this reason, frequently visited and praised Proudhon's federalism. Influenced by Edmund Burke, Frédéric Le Play, G.W.F. Hegel, and Hippolyte Taine, he developed an organicist conception of the Nation which contrasted with the universalism of the 1789 Declaration of the Rights of Man and of the Citizen. According to Barrès, the People is not founded by an act of autonomy, but find its origins in the earth (le sol), history (institutions, life and material conditions) and traditions and inheritance ("the dead"). His early individualism was quickly superseded by an organicist theory of the social link, in which "the individual is nothing, society is everything".

Barrès feared miscegenation of modern times, represented by Paris, claiming against Michelet that it jeopardised the unity of the Nation. The Nation was to be balanced between various local nationalities (he spoke of the "Lorraine nationality" as much as of the "French nationality") through decentralisation and the call for a leader, giving a Bonapartist aspect to his thought which explained his attraction for the General Boulanger and his opposition to liberal democracy. He pleaded for a direct democracy and personalisation of power, as well as for the implementation of popular referendums as done in Switzerland. In this nationalist frame, anti-Semitism was to be the cohesive factor for a right-wing mass movement.

Contrary to popular belief, Maurice Barrès never used the term "le grand remplacement" [great replacement], either in his novel "L'appel au soldat" or anywhere else. However he did make use of the underlying concept, namely that the French national character was being harmed by immigration of certain ethnic groups.

=== Hispanophilia ===
Barrès was a noted hispanophile. Influenced by the romantic mythification of Spain, he described the country as "an Africa leaving your soul with a sort of furor so fast as chilli does in your mouth". Always passionate about the "South" and "Orient", he emphasized in his work the period of Moorish domination. He interpreted the Spain of the time as a nation refractory to the attempts of economic and bureaucratic rationalization threatening his own country. He visited Spain in 1892, 1893 and 1902, capturing his vision of the country in his writings, taking a particular interest in Toledo.

=== Dada and Barrès ===
The Dadaists organised in spring 1921 the trial of Barrès, charged with an "attack on the safety of the mind" ("attentat à la sûreté de l'esprit") and sentenced him to 20 years of forced labour. This fictitious trial also marked the dissolution of Dada - its founders, among whom was Tristan Tzara, refusing any form of justice even if organised by Dada.

=== Final years and death ===
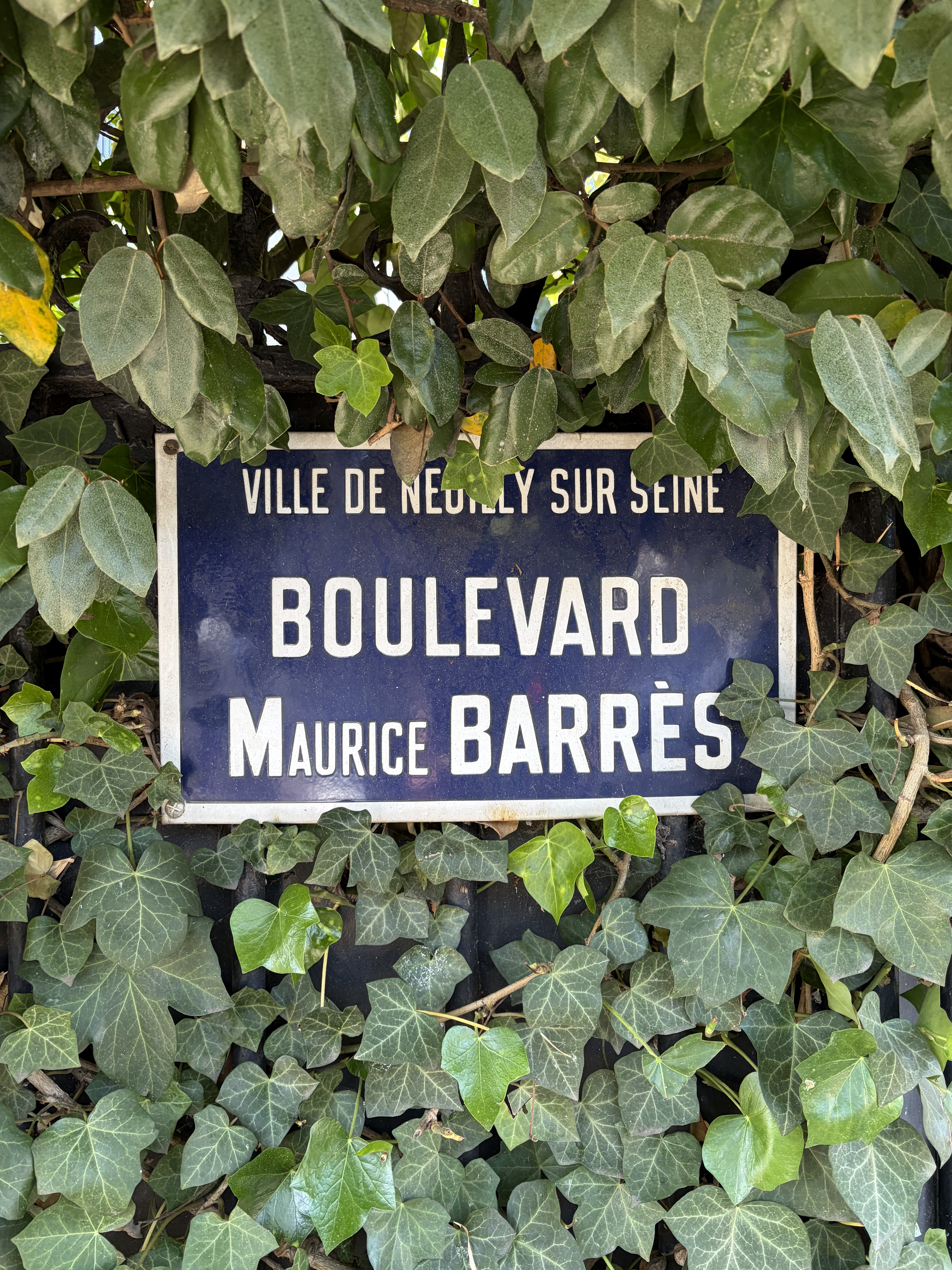
Boulevard Maurice Barrès, Neuilly-sur-Seine

An Orientalist romance, Un jardin sur l'Oronte (A Garden on the Orontes)—which would be the basis of an opera of the same name—was published in 1922, triggering what would be called la querelle de l'Oronte (the Orontes Quarrel).

Devout and sincere Catholics were shocked by the complacent, skilful, sometimes enchanting ways of Barrès in mixing the sacred and the profane. His heroine [Oriante] was both pagan and irresistible—and this provoked revolt.

Barrès died in Neuilly-sur-Seine on 4 December 1923.

== Works in English translation ==
- The Undying Spirit of France, Yale University Press, 1917.
- "Young Soldiers of France". In The War and the Spirit of Youth, Atlantic Monthly Company, 1917.
- Colette Baudoche: The Story of a Young Girl of Metz, George H. Doran Company, 1918.
- "Officers and Gentlemen", The Atlantic Monthly, Vol. CXXI, 1918.
- The Faith of France, Houghton Mifflin & Company, 1918.
- The Sacred Hill, The Macaulay Company, 1929.
- "Uprooted". In The World's Greatest Books, W. H. Wise & Co., 1941.

=== Other ===
- Massia Bibikoff, Our Indians at Marseilles, with an Introduction by Maurice Barrès, Smith, Elder and Company, 1915.
- Georges Lafond, Covered with Mud and Glory, with a Preface by Maurice Barrès, Small, Maynard & Company, 1918.
