= History of fascism (pre-1922) =

The history of fascism is the ideological, historical, and intellectual influences that culminated in the development of fascism, a far-right, authoritarian, and ultranationalist political ideology and movement that rose to prominence in early-20th-century Europe. The roots have been seen in the political culture of ancient Greece and ancient Rome, and later in Nazism and Italian Fascism.

Fascism emerged throughout the 20th century as a diverse, and an evolving synthesis of reactionary and revolutionary ideas, rather than a single, coherent system.

== Early influences (before 1880) ==
=== Background and 19th-century roots ===
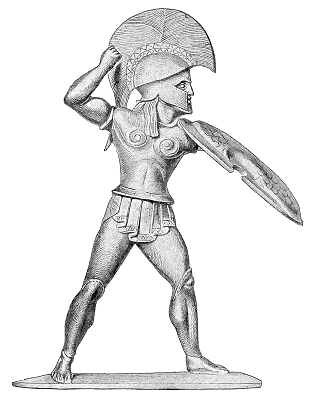
Depiction of an ancient Greek hoplite warrior. Ancient Sparta has been considered an inspiration for fascist and quasi-fascist movements, such as Nazism and quasi-fascist Metaxism.

Early influences that shaped the ideology of fascism have been dated back to Ancient Greece. The political culture of ancient Greece and specifically, the political culture of the ancient Greek city-state of Sparta under Lycurgus, with its emphasis on militarism and racial purity, were admired by the Nazis. Nazi Führer Adolf Hitler emphasised that Germany should adhere to Hellenic values and culture – particularly those of ancient Sparta. He rebuked potential criticism of Hellenic values being non-German by emphasising the common Aryan race connection with ancient Greeks, saying in Mein Kampf: "One must not allow the differences of the individual races to tear up the greater racial community". In fact, drawing racial ties to ancient Greek culture was seen as necessary to the national narrative, as Hitler was unimpressed with the cultural works of Germanic tribes at the time, saying, "if anyone asks us about our ancestors, we should continually allude to the ancient Greeks."

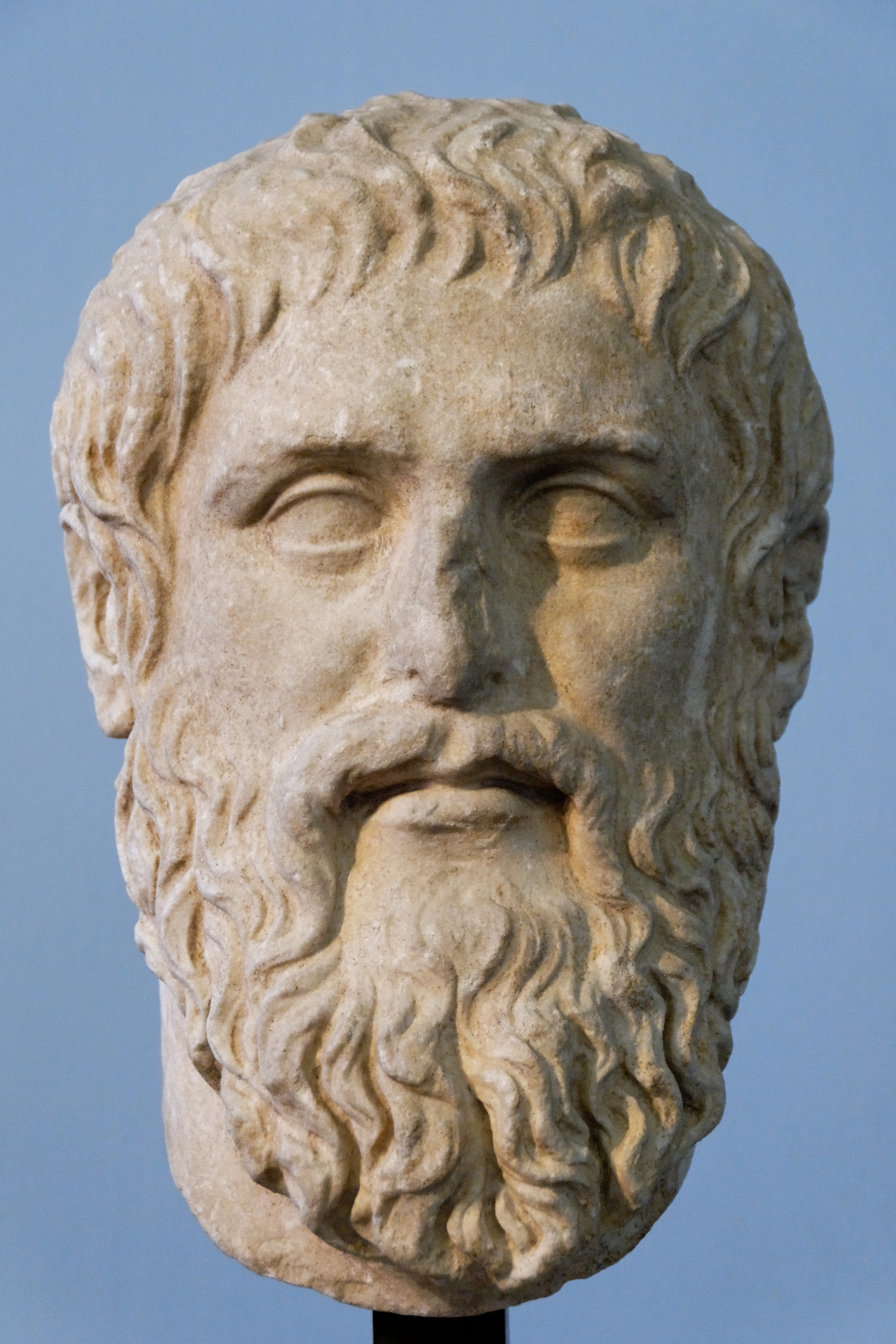
Bust of the ancient Greek philosopher Plato, whose works were admired by Mussolini

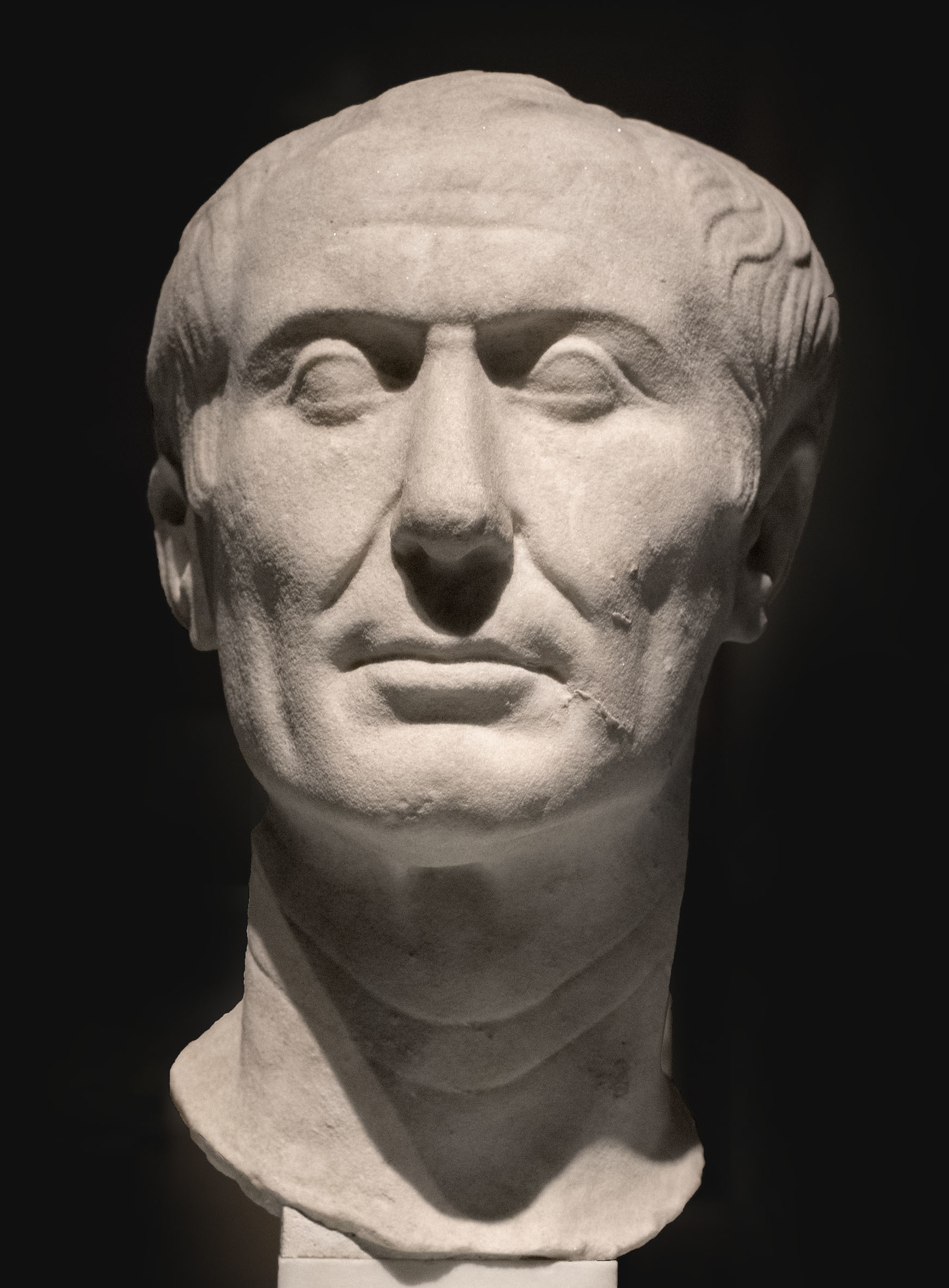
Bust of Roman Dictator Julius Caesar.

Hitler went on to say in Mein Kampf: "The struggle that rages today involves very great aims: a culture fights for its existence, which combines millenniums and embraces Hellenism and Germanity together". The Spartans were emulated by the quasi-fascist regime of Ioannis Metaxas who called for Greeks to wholly commit themselves to the nation with self-control as the Spartans had done. Supporters of the 4th of August Regime in the 1930s to 1940s justified the dictatorship of Metaxas on the basis that the "First Greek Civilization" involved an Athenian dictatorship led by Pericles who had brought ancient Greece to greatness. Italian fascist Benito Mussolini had a strong attachment to the works of the Greek philosopher Plato. In October 1943, Mussolini was reported to have kept Plato's work Republic on his desk at home, and he claimed to consult it from time to time before beginning his work each day.

Italian Fascists identified their ideology as being connected to the legacy of ancient Rome and particularly the Roman Empire: they idolised Julius Caesar and Augustus. Italian Fascism viewed the modern state of Italy as the heir of the Roman Empire and emphasised the need for Italian culture to "return to Roman values". Italian Fascists identified the Roman Empire as being an ideal organic and stable society in contrast to contemporary individualist liberal society that they saw as being chaotic in comparison. Julius Caesar was considered a role model by fascists because he led a revolution that overthrew an old order to establish a new order based on a dictatorship in which he wielded absolute power. Mussolini emphasised the need for dictatorship, activist leadership style and a leader cult like that of Julius Caesar that involved "the will to fix a unifying and balanced centre and a common will to action". Italian Fascists also idolised Augustus as the champion who built the Roman Empire. The fasces – a symbol of Roman authority – was the symbol of the Italian Fascists and was additionally adopted by many other national fascist movements formed in emulation of Italian Fascism. While a number of Nazis rejected Roman civilisation because they saw it as incompatible with Aryan Germanic culture and they also believed that Aryan Germanic culture was outside Roman culture, Adolf Hitler personally admired ancient Rome. Hitler focused on ancient Rome during its rise to dominance and at the height of its power as a model to follow, and he deeply admired the Roman Empire for its ability to forge a strong and unified civilisation. In private conversations, Hitler blamed the fall of the Roman Empire on the Roman adoption of Christianity because he claimed that Christianity authorised racial intermixing that he claimed weakened Rome and led to its destruction.

There were a number of influences on fascism from the Renaissance era in Europe. Niccolò Machiavelli is said to have influenced Italian Fascism, particularly through his promotion of the absolute authority of the state. Machiavelli rejected all existing traditional and metaphysical assumptions of the time – especially those associated with the Middle Ages – and asserted as an Italian patriot that Italy needed a strong and all-powerful state led by a vigorous and ruthless leader who would conquer and unify Italy. Mussolini saw himself as a modern-day Machiavellian and wrote an introduction to his honorary doctoral thesis for the University of Bologna – "Prelude to Machiavelli". Mussolini professed that Machiavelli's "pessimism about human nature was eternal in its acuity. Individuals simply could not be relied on voluntarily to 'obey the law, pay their taxes and serve in war'. No well-ordered society could want the people to be sovereign". Most dictators of the 20th century mimicked Mussolini's admiration for Machiavelli and "Stalin... saw himself as the embodiment of Machiavellian virtù".

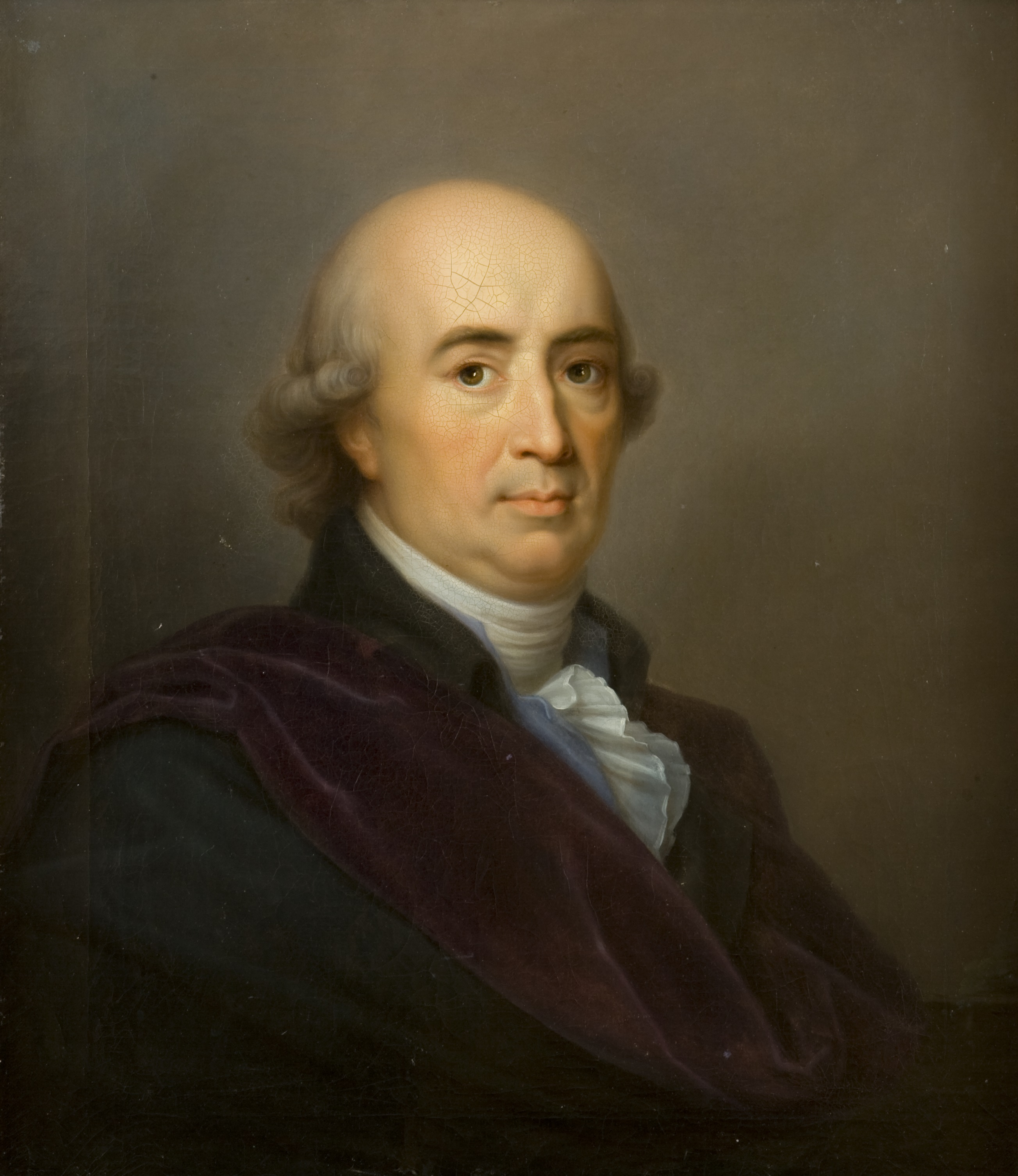
Portrait of Johann Gottfried Herder, the creator of the concept of nationalism

During the Enlightenment, a number of ideological influences arose that would shape the development of fascism. The development of the study of universal histories by Johann Gottfried Herder resulted in Herder's analysis of the development of nations. Herder developed the term Nationalismus ("nationalism") to describe this cultural phenomenon. At this time nationalism did not refer to the political ideology of nationalism that was later developed during the French Revolution. Herder also developed the theory that modern Europeans are the descendants of Proto-Indo-Europeans that were then referred to as "Aryans" based on language studies. Herder argued that the Germanic peoples held close racial connections with the ancient Indians and ancient Persians, who he claimed were advanced peoples possessing a great capacity for wisdom, nobility, restraint and science. Contemporaries of Herder used the concept of the Aryan race to draw a distinction between what they deemed "high and noble" Aryan culture versus that of "parasitic" Semitic culture and this antisemitic variant view of Europeans' Aryan roots formed the basis of Nazi racial views. Another major influence on fascism came from the political theories of Georg Wilhelm Friedrich Hegel. Hegel promoted the absolute authority of the state and said "nothing short of the state is the actualization of freedom" and that the "state is the march of God on earth".

The French Revolution and its political legacy had a major influence upon the development of fascism. Fascists view the French Revolution as a largely negative event that resulted in the entrenchment of liberal ideas such as liberal democracy, anticlericalism and rationalism. Racist nationalists in particular condemned the French Revolution for granting social equality to "inferior races" such as Jews. Mussolini condemned the French Revolution for developing liberalism, scientific socialism and liberal democracy, but also acknowledged that fascism extracted and used all the elements that had preserved those ideologies' vitality and that fascism had no desire to restore the conditions that precipitated the French Revolution. Though fascism opposed core parts of the Revolution, fascists supported other aspects of it, Mussolini declared his support for the Revolution's demolishment of remnants of the Middle Ages such as tolls and compulsory labour upon citizens and he noted that the French Revolution did have benefits in that it had been a cause of the whole French nation and not merely a political party. Most importantly, the French Revolution was responsible for the entrenchment of nationalism as a political ideology – both in its development in France as French nationalism and in the creation of nationalist movements particularly in Germany with the development of German nationalism by Johann Gottlieb Fichte as a political response to the development of French nationalism. The Nazis accused the French Revolution of being dominated by Jews and Freemasons and were deeply disturbed by the Revolution's intention to completely break France away from its history in what the Nazis claimed was a repudiation of history that they asserted to be a trait of the Enlightenment. Though the Nazis were highly critical of the Revolution, Hitler in Mein Kampf said that the French Revolution is a model for how to achieve change that he claims was caused by the rhetorical strength of demagogues. Furthermore, the Nazis idealised the levée en masse (mass mobilisation of soldiers) that was developed by French Revolutionary armies and the Nazis sought to use the system for their paramilitary movement.

Georges Valois, founder of the first non-Italian fascist party Faisceau, claimed the roots of fascism stemmed from the late 18th century Jacobin movement, seeing in its totalitarian nature a foreshadowing of the fascist state. Historian George Mosse similarly analyzed fascism as an inheritor of the mass ideology and civil religion of the French Revolution, as well as a result of the brutalisation of societies in 1914–1918.

Historians such as Irene Collins and Howard C. Payne see Napoleon III, who ran a 'police state' and suppressed the media, as a forerunner of fascism. According to David Thomson, the Italian Risorgimento of 1871 led to the 'nemesis of fascism'. William L Shirer sees a continuity from the views of Fichte and Hegel, through Bismarck, to Hitler; Robert Gerwarth speaks of a 'direct line' from Bismarck to Hitler. Julian Dierkes sees fascism as a 'particularly violent form of imperialism'.

== Fin de siècle era and the fusion of nationalism with Sorelianism (1880–1914) ==
The ideological roots of fascism have been traced to the 1880s and in particular to the fin de siècle theme of that time. The theme originated from revolt against materialism, rationalism, positivism, bourgeois society, and liberal democracy. The fin-de-siècle generation supported emotionalism, irrationalism, subjectivism, and vitalism. The fin-de-siècle mindset saw civilisation as being in a crisis that required a massive and total solution. The fin-de-siècle intellectual school of the 1890s – including Gabriele d'Annunzio and Enrico Corradini in Italy; Maurice Barrès, Edouard Drumont and Georges Sorel in France; and Paul de Lagarde, Julius Langbehn and Arthur Moeller van den Bruck in Germany – saw social and political collectivity as more important than individualism and rationalism. They considered the individual as only one part of the larger collectivity, which they did not view as an atomised numerical sum of individuals. They condemned the rationalistic individualism of liberal society and the dissolution of social links in bourgeois society. They saw modern society as one of mediocrity, materialism, instability, and corruption. They denounced big-city urban society as being merely based on instinct and animality and without heroism.

The fin-de-siècle outlook was influenced by various intellectual developments, including Darwinian biology; Wagnerian aesthetics (Gesamtkunstwerk); Arthur de Gobineau's racialism; Gustave Le Bon's psychology; and the philosophies of Friedrich Nietzsche, Fyodor Dostoyevsky and Henri Bergson. Social Darwinism, which gained widespread acceptance, made no distinction between physical and social life and viewed the human condition as being an unceasing struggle to achieve the survival of the fittest. Social Darwinism challenged positivism's claim of deliberate and rational choice as the determining behaviour of humans, with social Darwinism focusing on heredity, race and environment. Social Darwinism's emphasis on biogroup identity and the role of organic relations within societies fostered legitimacy and appeal for nationalism. New theories of social and political psychology also rejected the notion of human behaviour being governed by rational choice, and instead claimed that emotion was more influential in political issues than reason. Nietzsche's argument that "God is dead" coincided with his attack on the "herd mentality" of Christianity, democracy, and modern collectivism; his concept of the Übermensch; and his advocacy of the will to power as a primordial instinct were major influences upon many of the fin-de-siècle generation. Bergson's claim of the existence of an "élan vital" ("vital instinct") centred upon free choice and rejected the processes of materialism and determinism, thus challenging Marxism.

With the advent of the Darwinian theory of evolution came claims of evolution possibly leading to decadence. Proponents of decadence-theories claimed that contemporary Western society's decadence was the result of modern life, including urbanisation, a sedentary lifestyle, the survival of the least fit and modern culture's emphasis on egalitarianism, individualistic anomie, and nonconformity. The main work that gave rise to decadence-theories was the book Degeneration (1892) by Max Nordau that became popular in Europe; ideas of decadence helped the cause of nationalists who presented nationalism as a cure for decadence.

Gaetano Mosca in his work The Ruling Class (1896) developed the theory that claims that in all societies, an "organized minority" will dominate and rule over the "disorganized majority". Mosca claims that there are only two classes in society, "the governing" (the organised minority) and "the governed" (the disorganised majority). He claims that the organised nature of the organised minority makes it irresistible to any individual of the disorganised majority. Mosca developed this theory in 1896, arguing that the problem of the supremacy of civilian power in society is solved in part by the presence and social structural design of militaries. He claims that the social structure of the military is ideal because it includes diverse social elements that balance each other out; and more important is its inclusion of an officer class as a "power élite". Mosca presented the social structure and methods of governance by the military as a valid model of development for civilian society. Mosca's theories are known to have significantly influenced Mussolini's notion of the political process and fascism.

Related to Mosca's theory of domination of society by an organised minority over a disorganised majority, Robert Michels in 1911 propounded his theory of an iron law of oligarchy, which was a major attack on the basis of contemporary democracy. Michels argues that oligarchy is inevitable as an "iron law" within any organisation as part of the "tactical and technical necessities" of organisation. On the topic of democracy, Michels stated: "It is organisation which gives birth to the dominion of the elected over the electors, of the mandataries over the mandators, of the delegates over the delegators. Who says organisation, says oligarchy." He claims: "Historical evolution mocks all the prophylactic measures that have been adopted for the prevention of oligarchy." He states that the official goal of contemporary democracy of eliminating élite rule was impossible, that democracy is a façade which legitimises the rule of a particular élite and that élite rule (which he refers to as oligarchy) is inevitable. Michels had previously been a social democrat, but became drawn to the ideas of Georges Sorel, Édouard Berth, Arturo Labriola and Enrico Leone; he came to strongly oppose the parliamentarian, legalistic and bureaucratic socialism of social democracy. As early as 1904 he began to advocate in favor of patriotism and national interests. Later he began to support activist, voluntarist, and anti-parliamentarian concepts, and in 1911 he took a position in favor of the Italian war-effort in Libya and started moving towards Italian nationalism. Michels eventually became a supporter of fascism upon Mussolini's rise to power in 1922, viewing fascism's goal of destroying liberal democracy in a sympathetic manner.

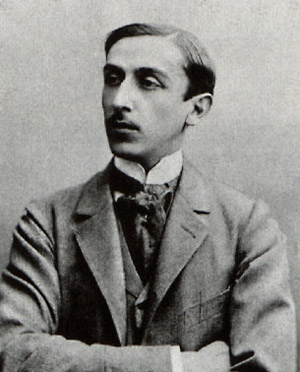
Maurice Barrès

Maurice Barrès (1862–1923), a French politician of the late-19th and early-20th centuries who influenced the later fascist movement, claimed that true democracy was authoritarian democracy, while rejecting liberal democracy as a fraud. Barrès claimed that authoritarian democracy involved a spiritual connection between a leader of a nation and the nation's people, and that true freedom did not arise from individual rights or from parliamentary restraints, but through "heroic leadership" and "national power". He emphasised a need for hero-worship and for charismatic leadership in national society. Barrès was an early member of the League for the French Fatherland (French: Ligue de la patrie française) founded in 1898, and coined the term "socialist nationalism" to describe his views during an electoral campaign in 1898. He emphasised class collaboration, the role of intuition and emotion in politics alongside racial antisemitism, and "he tried to combine the search for energy and a vital style of life with national rootedness and a sort of Darwinian racism." Later in life he returned to cultural traditionalism and parliamentary conservatism, but his ideas contributed to the development of an extremist form of nationalism in pre-1914 France. Other French nationalist intellectuals of the early 20th century also wished to "obliterate the class struggle in ideological terms", ending the threat of communism by persuading working people to identify with their nation rather than with their class.

The rise of support for anarchism in this period of time was important in influencing the politics of fascism. The anarchist Mikhail Bakunin's concept of propaganda of the deed, which stressed the importance of direct action as the primary means of politics – including revolutionary violence, became popular amongst fascists who admired the concept and adopted it as a part of fascism.

=== Syndicalism ===
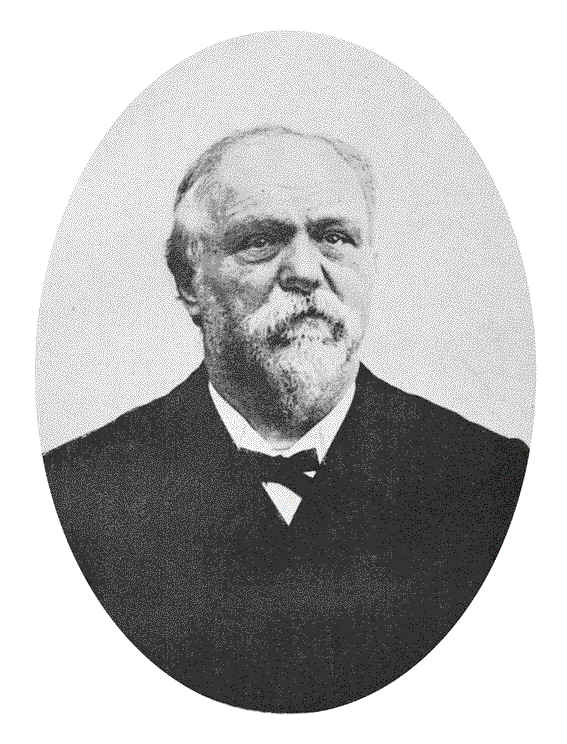
Georges Sorel

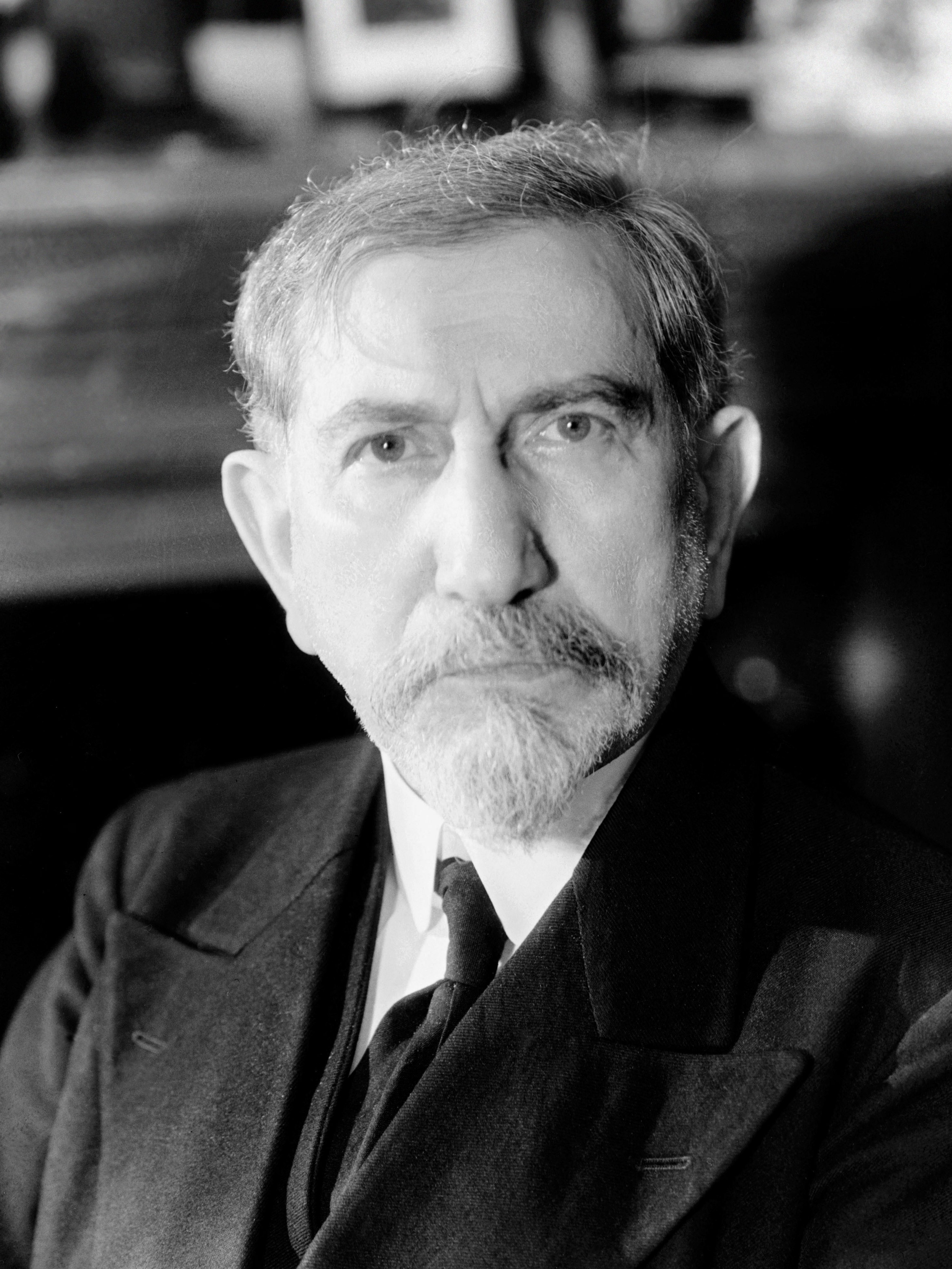
Charles Maurras.

One of the key persons who greatly influenced fascism was the French intellectual Georges Sorel (1847–1922), who "must be considered one of the least classifiable political thinkers of the twentieth century" and who supported a variety of different ideologies in the course of his life, including conservatism, socialism, revolutionary syndicalism and nationalism. Sorel also contributed to the fusion of anarchism and syndicalism together to form anarcho-syndicalism. He promoted the legitimacy of political violence in his work Reflections on Violence (French: Réflexions sur la violence, 1908), during a period in his life when he advocated radical syndicalist action to achieve a revolution which would overthrow capitalism and the bourgeoisie through a general strike. In Reflections on Violence, Sorel emphasised need for a revolutionary political religion. In his book The Illusions of Progress (1908), Sorel denounced democracy as reactionary, saying "nothing is more aristocratic than democracy". By 1909, after the failure of a syndicalist general strike in France, Sorel and his supporters abandoned the radical left and went to the radical right, where they sought to merge militant Catholicism and French patriotism with their views – advocating anti-republican Christian French patriots as ideal revolutionaries. In the early 1900s Sorel had officially been a revisionist of Marxism, but by 1910 he announced his abandonment of socialism, and in 1914 he claimed – following an aphorism of Benedetto Croce – that "socialism is dead" due to the "decomposition of Marxism". Sorel became a supporter of reactionary Maurrassian integral nationalism beginning in 1909, and this greatly influenced his works.

Sorel's political allegiances shifted constantly, influencing a variety of people across the political spectrum from Benito Mussolini to Benedetto Croce to Georg Lukács, and both sympathisers and critics of Sorel considered his political thought to be a collection of separate ideas with no coherence and no common thread linking them. In its heterogeneity, Sorelianism is considered to be a precursor to fascism, as fascist thought also drew from disparate sources and did not form a single coherent ideological system. Sorel described himself as "a self-taught man exhibiting to other people the notebooks which have served for my own instruction", and stated that his goal was to be original in all of his writings and that his apparent lack of coherence was due to an unwillingness to write down anything that had already been said elsewhere by someone else. The academic intellectual establishment did not take him seriously, but Mussolini applauded Sorel by declaring: "What I am, I owe to Sorel".

Charles Maurras (1868–1952) was a French right-wing monarchist and nationalist with an interest in merging his nationalist ideals with Sorelian syndicalism as a means to confront liberal democracy. This fusion of nationalism from the political right with Sorelian syndicalism from the left took place around the outbreak of World War I. Sorelian syndicalism, unlike other ideologies on the left, held an elitist view that the morality of the working class needed to be raised. The Sorelian concept of the positive nature of social war and its insistence on a moral revolution led some syndicalists to believe that war was the ultimate manifestation of social change and moral revolution.

The fusion of Maurrassian nationalism and Sorelian syndicalism influenced radical Italian nationalist Enrico Corradini. Corradini spoke of the need for a nationalist-syndicalist movement, led by elitist aristocrats and anti-democrats who shared a revolutionary syndicalist commitment to direct action and a willingness to fight. Corradini spoke of Italy as being a "proletarian nation" that needed to pursue imperialism to challenge the "plutocratic" French and British. Corradini's views were part of a wider set of perceptions within the right-wing Italian Nationalist Association (ANI), which claimed that Italy's economic backwardness was caused by corruption in its political class, liberalism, and division caused by "ignoble socialism". The ANI had ties and influence among conservatives, Catholics, and the business community. Italian national syndicalists held a common set of principles: the rejection of bourgeois values, democracy, liberalism, Marxism, internationalism and pacifism and the promotion of heroism, vitalism and violence.

Until 1914, Italian nationalists and revolutionary syndicalists with nationalist leanings remained apart. Such syndicalists opposed the Italo-Turkish War of 1911 as an affair of financial interests and not of the nation, but both Italian nationalists and syndicalists saw World War I (in which Italy participated from May 1915) as a national affair.

=== Futurism ===
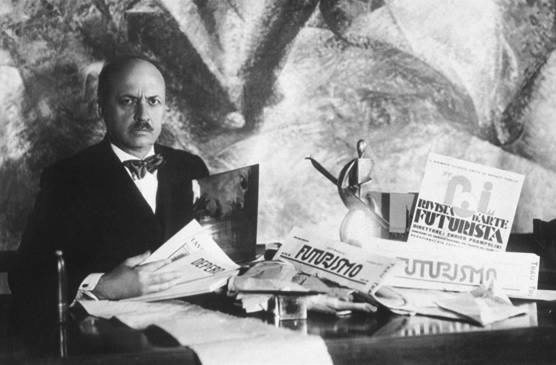
Filippo Tommaso Marinetti, author of the Futurist Manifesto (1908) and later the co-author of the Fascist Manifesto (1919)

Radical nationalism in Italy – support for expansionism and cultural revolution to create a "New Man" and a "New State" – began to grow in 1912 during the Italian conquest of Libya and was supported by Italian Futurists and by members of the ANI. Futurism was both an artistic-cultural movement and initially a political movement in Italy led by Filippo Tommaso Marinetti, the author of the Futurist Manifesto (1908), that championed the causes of modernism, action and political violence as necessary elements of politics while denouncing liberalism and parliamentary politics. Marinetti rejected conventional democracy as based on majority rule and egalitarianism, while promoting a new form of democracy, which he described in his work "The Futurist Conception of Democracy" as the following: "We are therefore able to give the directions to create and to dismantle to numbers, to quantity, to the mass, for with us number, quantity and mass will never be – as they are in Germany and Russia – the number, quantity and mass of mediocre men, incapable and indecisive". The ANI claimed that liberal democracy was no longer compatible with the modern world and advocated a strong state and imperialism, claiming that humans are naturally predatory and that nations were in a constant struggle, in which only the strongest nations could survive.

== World War I and aftermath (1914–1922) ==
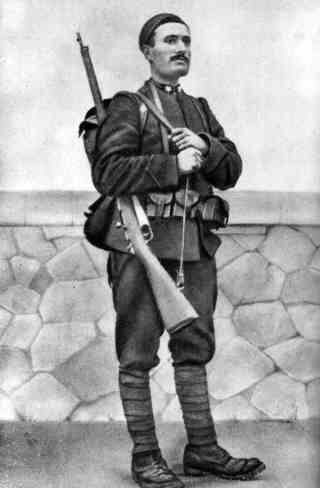
Benito Mussolini in 1917 as an Italian soldier in World War I

At the outbreak of World War I in August 1914, the Italian political left became severely split over its position on the war. The Italian Socialist Party (PSI) opposed the war on the grounds of proletarian internationalism, but a number of Italian revolutionary syndicalists supported intervention in the war against Germany and Austria-Hungary on the grounds that their reactionary regimes had to be defeated to ensure the success of socialism, with such intervention serving to mobilise the masses against the status quo, and that the national question had to be resolved before the social one. Corradini presented the need for Italy as a "proletarian nation" to defeat a reactionary Germany from a nationalist perspective. Angelo Oliviero Olivetti formed a pro-interventionist fascio called the Revolutionary Fasces of International Action in October 1914. At the same time, Benito Mussolini upon being expelled from his position as chief editor of the PSI's newspaper Avanti! for his anti-German stance, joined the interventionist cause in a separate fascio. At first, these interventionist groups were composed of disaffected syndicalists who had concluded that their attempts to promote social change through a general strike had been a failure, and became interested in the transformative potential of militarism and war. The term "fascism" was first used in 1915 by members of Mussolini's movement, the Fasces of Revolutionary Action.

This early interventionist movement was very small, and it did not advocate an integrated set of policies. The first meeting of the Fasces of Revolutionary Action was held on 24 January 1915 when Mussolini declared that it was necessary for Europe to resolve its national problems—including national borders—of Italy and elsewhere "for the ideals of justice and liberty for which oppressed peoples must acquire the right to belong to those national communities from which they descended". Its attempts to hold mass meetings were ineffective and it was regularly harassed by government authorities and socialists. Antagonism between interventionists and socialists resulted in violence. Attacks on interventionists were so violent that even democratic socialists who opposed the war, such as Anna Kuliscioff, said that the Italian Socialist Party had gone too far in its campaign to silence supporters of the war.

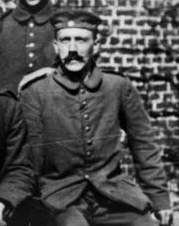
Adolf Hitler as a German soldier in World War I

Similar political ideas arose in Germany after the outbreak of the war. German sociologist Johann Plenge spoke of the rise of a "National Socialism" in Germany within what he termed the "ideas of 1914" that were a declaration of war against the "ideas of 1789" (the French Revolution). According to Plenge, the "ideas of 1789"—such as the rights of man, democracy, individualism and liberalism—were being rejected in favor of "the ideas of 1914" that included "German values" of duty, discipline, law and order. Plenge believed that racial solidarity (Volksgemeinschaft) would replace class division and that "racial comrades" would unite to create a socialist society in the struggle of "proletarian" Germany against "capitalist" Britain.

=== Impact of World War I ===
Benito Mussolini became prominent within the early pro-war movement thanks to his newspaper, Il Popolo d'Italia, which he founded in November 1914 to support the interventionist cause. The newspaper received funding from the governments of Allied powers that wanted Italy to join them in the war, particularly France and Britain. Il Popolo d'Italia was also partially funded by Italian industrialists who hoped to gain financially from the war, including Fiat, other arms manufacturers, and agrarian interests. Mussolini did not have any clear agenda in the beginning other than support for Italy's entry into the war, and as a result, he sought to appeal to diverse groups of readers. These readers ranged from dissident socialists who opposed the Socialist Party's anti-war stance, to democratic idealists who believed that the war would result in the overthrow of autocratic monarchies across Europe, to Italian patriots who wanted to recover ethnic Italian territories from Austria, to imperialists who dreamed of establishing a new Roman Empire.

By early 1915, Mussolini had moved towards the nationalist position. He began to argue that Italy should conquer Trieste and Fiume, and he also argued that Italy should expand its northeastern border to the Alps, following the ideals of Mazzini who called for the waging of a patriotic war to "secure Italy's natural frontiers of language and race". Mussolini also advocated the waging of a war of conquest in the Balkans and the Middle East, and his supporters began to call themselves fascisti. He also started to advocate a "positive attitude" towards capitalism and capitalists, as part of his transition towards supporting class collaboration and an "Italy first" position.

Italy finally entered the war on the Allied side in May 1915. Mussolini later took credit for having allegedly forced the government to declare war on Austria, although his influence on events was minimal. He enrolled into the Royal Italian Army in September 1915 and fought in the war until 1917, when he was wounded during a training exercise and discharged. Italy's use of daredevil elite shock troops known as the Arditi, beginning in 1917, was an important influence on the early Fascist movement. The Arditi were soldiers who were specifically trained for a life of violence and wore unique blackshirt uniforms and fezzes. The Arditi formed a national organisation in November 1918, the Associazione fra gli Arditi d'Italia, which by mid-1919 had about twenty thousand young men within it. Mussolini appealed to the Arditi, and the Fascist Squadristi movement that developed after the war was based upon the Arditi.

=== Impact of Revolutions of 1917–1923 ===
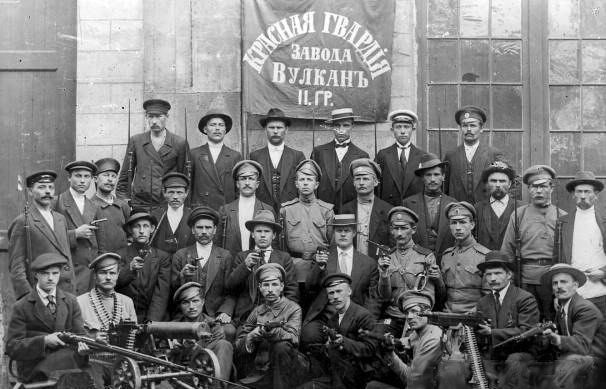
Russian Bolsheviks shortly after the October Revolution of 1917. Fascists politically benefited from fear of communist revolution by promising themselves as a radical alternative that would forcibly stop communist class revolution and resolve class differences.

A major event that greatly influenced the development of fascism was the October Revolution of 1917, in which Bolshevik communists led by Vladimir Lenin seized power in Russia and later established the Soviet Union. The revolution in Russia gave rise to a fear of communism among the elites and among society at large in several European countries, and fascist movements gained support by presenting themselves as a radical anti-communist political force, and as especially opposed to the Marxists. Anti-communism was also an expression of fascist anti-universalism, as communism insisted on international working class unity while fascism insisted on national interests. In addition, fascist anti-communism was linked to antisemitism and even anti-capitalism, because many fascists believed that communism and capitalism were both Jewish creations meant to undermine nation-states. The Nazis advocated the conspiracy theory that Jewish communists were working together with Jewish finance capital against Germany. After World War I, fascists commonly campaigned on anti-Marxist agendas and used the fear of a communist revolution.

Paxton writes that fascists profited from the failure of Lenin's plan to launch the world socialist revolution, which attempted to take form during the broader period of Revolutions of 1917–1923. The socialist project competed with the liberal and conservative ones. Liberal ideas regarding rebuilding Europe and the world were summarized in Woodrow Wilson's Fourteen Points, proposing a harmony of equal nations; the conservatives sought to make military force the base for the new order ruled by great powers. None of them were realized completely: the revolution was not suppressed only in the former Russian Empire (Russian Civil War) while being defeated in Germany (Revolution of 1918–1919) and Hungary (Revolution of 1918–1920), but the class struggle continued in Europe; the realization of Wilson's plan took a direction closer to conservatism and resulted in the hierarchy of small nations and the victorious Allied states; the Allied conservatism tried to suppress the formal Central Powers but led to revanchism. The failure of the three opened a window for a new project offered by fascists, drawing on their frustrations: they promised to overcome class struggle with authoritarian nationalism and purging the "alien" and the "impure", a world of great powers, but with greatness determined "not only by military might, but by the fervor and unity of their populations", and rejected peace in favour of the decisive victory over the weaker ones. Other than that, since the socialist struggle continued and threatened to follow the success of the Russian Revolution, primarily middle and upper classes sought a decisive answer to it which at the same time would deal with the crisis of liberal institutions. In Italy, this crisis reached its highest during the Biennio Rosso of 1919–1920, the peak of the socialist activities including massive land seizures and strikes and socialists becoming elected as mayors and parliament members, which led to the rise of fear of a revolution among the middle and conservative classes.

Mussolini's immediate reaction to the Russian Revolution was contradictory. He admired Lenin's boldness in seizing power by force and he was envious of the success of the Bolsheviks, but at the same time, he attacked them in his paper for restricting free speech and for establishing "a tyranny worse than that of the tsars." At this time, between 1917 and 1919, Mussolini and the early Fascist movement presented themselves as opponents of censorship and champions of free thought and speech, calling these "among the highest expressions of human civilisation." Mussolini wrote that "we are libertarians above all" and claimed that the Fascists were committed to "loving liberty for everyone, even for our enemies." In 1919, Mussolini consolidated control over the fascist movement, known as Sansepolcrismo, with the founding of the Italian Fasces of Combat.

=== Mussolini's consolidation of the fascist movement ===
Mussolini consolidated his control over the Fascist movement in 1919 with the founding of the Fasci Italiani di Combattimento in Milan. For a brief time in 1919, this early fascist movement tried to position itself as a radical populist alternative to the socialists, offering its own version of a revolutionary transformation of society. In a speech delivered in Milan's Piazza San Sepolcro in March 1919, Mussolini set forward the proposals of the new movement, combining ideas from nationalism, Sorelian syndicalism, the idealism of the French philosopher Henri Bergson, and the theories of Gaetano Mosca and Vilfredo Pareto. Mussolini declared his opposition to Bolshevism because "Bolshevism has ruined the economic life of Russia" and because he claimed that Bolshevism was incompatible with Western civilisation; he said that "we declare war against socialism, not because it is socialism, but because it has opposed nationalism", that "we intend to be an active minority, to attract the proletariat away from the official Socialist party" and that "we go halfway toward meeting the workers"; and he declared that "we favor national syndicalism and reject state intervention whenever it aims at throttling the creation of wealth."

In these early post-war years, the Italian Fascist movement tried to become a broad political umbrella that could include all people of all classes and political positions, united only by a desire to save Italy from the Marxist threat and to ensure the expansion of Italian territories in the post-war peace settlements. Il Popolo d'Italia wrote in March 1919 that "We allow ourselves the luxury of being aristocrats and democrats, conservatives and progressives, reactionaries and revolutionaries, legalists and antilegalists."

=== Fascist Manifesto and Charter of Carnaro ===
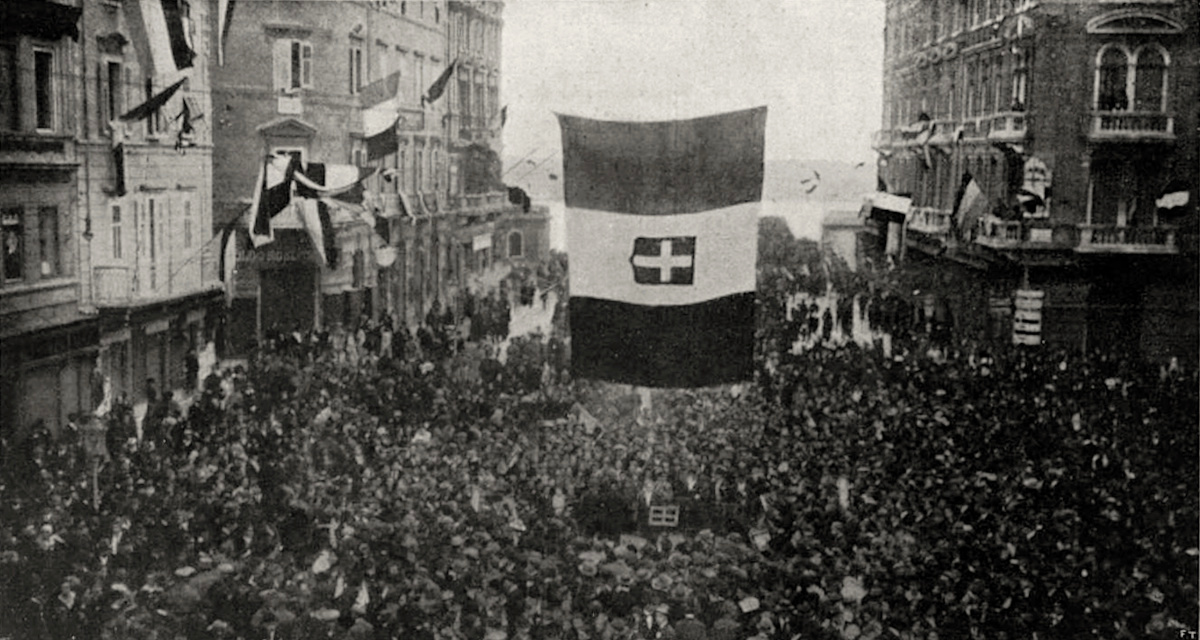
The birthday celebration of the Italian king Victor Emmanuel III in Fiume (Rijeka) on 11 November 1918

Later in 1919, Alceste De Ambris and futurist movement leader Filippo Tommaso Marinetti created The Manifesto of the Italian Fasci of Combat (also known as the Fascist Manifesto). The Manifesto was presented on 6 June 1919 in the Fascist newspaper Il Popolo d'Italia. The Manifesto supported the creation of universal suffrage for both men and women (the latter being realised only partly in late 1925, with all opposition parties banned or disbanded); proportional representation on a regional basis; government representation through a corporatist system of "National Councils" of experts, selected from professionals and tradespeople, elected to represent and hold legislative power over their respective areas, including labour, industry, transportation, public health, communications, etc.; and the abolition of the Italian Senate. The Manifesto supported the creation of an eight-hour work day for all workers, a minimum wage, worker representation in industrial management, equal confidence in labour unions as in industrial executives and public servants, reorganisation of the transportation sector, revision of the draft law on invalidity insurance, reduction of the retirement age from 65 to 55, a strong progressive tax on capital, confiscation of the property of religious institutions and abolishment of bishoprics and revision of military contracts to allow the government to seize 85% of war profits made by the armaments industry. It also called for the creation of a short-service national militia to serve defensive duties, nationalisation of the armaments industry and a foreign policy designed to be peaceful but also competitive. Nevertheless, Mussolini also demanded the expansion of Italian territories, particularly by annexing Dalmatia (which he claimed could be accomplished by peaceful means), and insisted that "the state must confine itself to directing the civil and political life of the nation," which meant taking the government out of business and transferring large segments of the economy from public to private control. The intention was to appeal to a working class electorate while also maintaining the support of business interests, even if this meant making contradictory promises.

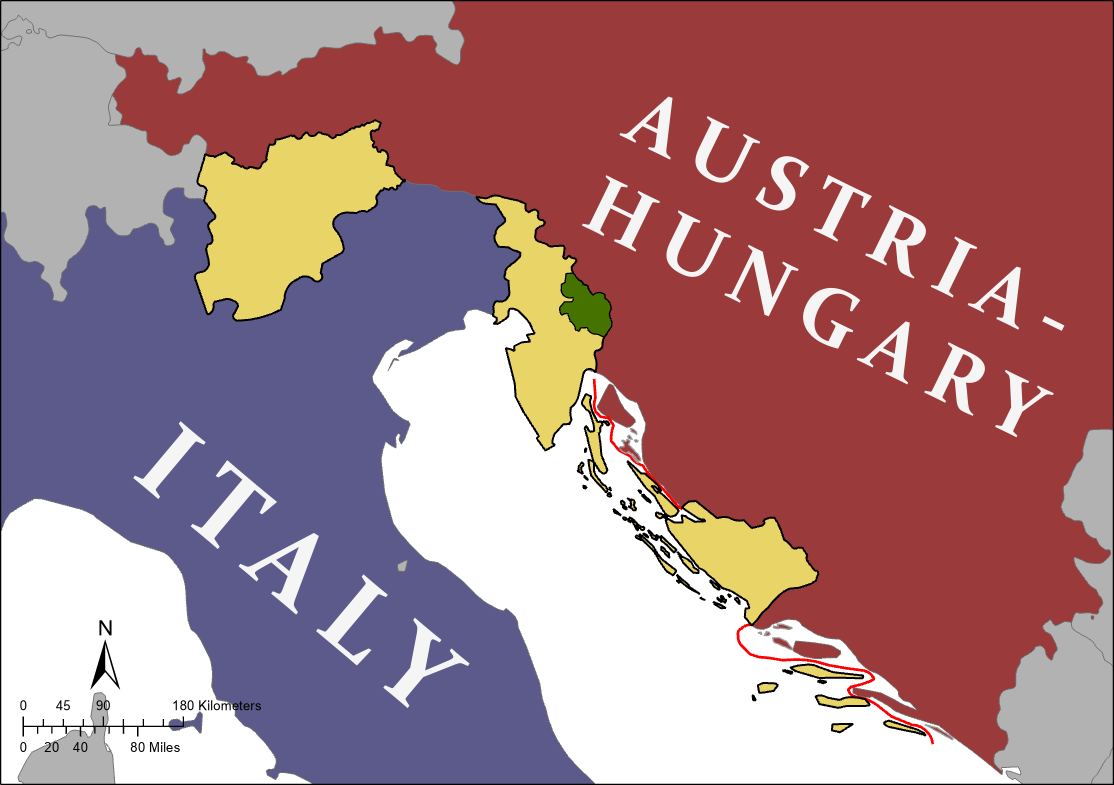
Territories promised to Italy by the Treaty of London (1915): Trentino-Alto Adige, the Julian March and Dalmatia (tan) and the Snežnik Plateau area (green). However, after World War I, while Italy annexed the capital city Zara of Dalmatia the rest of Dalmatia was not assigned to Italy but to Yugoslavia.

With this manifesto, the Fasci Italiani di Combattimento campaigned in the Italian elections of November 1919, mostly attempting to take votes away from the socialists. The results were disastrous. The fascists received less than 5,000 votes in their political heartland of Milan, compared to 190,000 for the socialists, and not a single fascist candidate was elected to any office. Mussolini's political career seemed to be over. This crippling electoral defeat was largely due to fascism's lack of ideological credibility, as the fascist movement was a mixture of many different ideas and tendencies. It contained monarchists, republicans, syndicalists and conservatives, and some candidates supported the Vatican while others wanted to expel the Pope from Italy. In response to the failure of his electoral strategy, Mussolini shifted his political movement to the right, seeking to form an alliance with the conservatives. Soon, agrarian conflicts in the region of Emilia and in the Po Valley provided an opportunity to launch a series of violent attacks against the socialists, and thus to win credibility with the conservatives and establish fascism as a paramilitary movement rather than an electoral one.

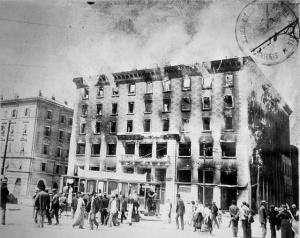
The Slovene Narodni dom ("National Home") in Trieste on fire after being burned by Fascists on 13 July 1920.

With the antagonism between anti-interventionist Marxists and pro-interventionist Fascists complete by the end of the war, the two sides became irreconcilable. The Fascists presented themselves as anti-Marxists and as opposed to the Marxists. Mussolini tried to build his popular support especially among war veterans and patriots by enthusiastically supporting Gabriele D'Annunzio, the leader of the annexationist faction in post-war Italy, who demanded the annexation of large territories as part of the peace settlement in the aftermath of the war. For D'Annunzio and other nationalists, the city of Fiume in Dalmatia (present-day Croatia) had "suddenly become the symbol of everything sacred." Fiume was a city with an ethnic Italian majority, while its suburbs were largely ethnic Croatian. Italy demanded the annexation of Fiume and the region around it as a reward for its contribution to the Allied war effort, but the Allies – and US president Woodrow Wilson in particular – intended to give the region to the newly formed Kingdom of Serbs, Croats and Slovenes (later renamed Yugoslavia).

As such, the next events that influenced the Fascists were the raid of Fiume by Italian nationalist Gabriele D'Annunzio and the founding of the Charter of Carnaro in 1920. D'Annunzio and De Ambris designed the Charter, which advocated national-syndicalist corporatist productionism alongside D'Annunzio's political views. Many Fascists saw the Charter of Carnaro as an ideal constitution for a Fascist Italy. This behaviour of aggression towards Yugoslavia and South Slavs was pursued by Italian Fascists with their persecution of South Slavs—especially Slovenes and Croats. Italy claimed Fiume on the principle of self-determination, disregarding the 50.4% of its population that were Yugoslavs.

=== Accommodating conservatives ===
In 1920, militant strike activity by industrial workers reached its peak in Italy, where 1919 and 1920 were known as the "Red Years". Mussolini first supported the strikes, but when this did not help him to gain any additional supporters, he abruptly reversed his position and began to oppose them, seeking financial support from big business and landowners. The donations he received from industrial and agrarian interest groups were unusually large, as they were very concerned about working class unrest and eager to support any political force that stood against it. Together with many smaller donations that he received from the public as part of a fund drive to support D'Annunzio, this helped to build up the Fascist movement and transform it from a small group based around Milan to a national political force. Mussolini organised his own militia, known as the "blackshirts," which started a campaign of violence against Communists, Socialists, trade unions and co-operatives under the pretense of "saving the country from bolshevism" and preserving order and internal peace in Italy. Some of the blackshirts also engaged in armed attacks against the Church, "where several priests were assassinated and churches burned by the Fascists".

At the same time, Mussolini continued to present himself as the champion of Italian national interests and territorial expansion in the Balkans. In the autumn of 1920, Fascist blackshirts in the Italian city of Trieste (located not far from Fiume, and inhabited by Italians as well as Slavs) engaged in street violence and vandalism against Slavs. Mussolini visited the city to support them and was greeted by an enthusiastic crowd – the first time in his political career that he achieved such broad popular support. He also focused his rhetoric on attacks against the liberal government of Giovanni Giolitti, who had withdrawn Italian troops from Albania and did not press the Allies to allow Italy to annex Dalmatia. This helped to draw disaffected former soldiers into the Fascist ranks.

Fascists identified their primary opponents as the socialists on the left who had opposed intervention in World War I. The Fascists and the rest of the Italian political right held common ground: both held Marxism in contempt, discounted class consciousness and believed in the rule of elites. The Fascists assisted the anti-socialist campaign by allying with the other parties and the conservative right in a mutual effort to destroy the Italian Socialist Party and labour organisations committed to class identity above national identity.

In 1921, the radical wing of the Italian Socialist Party broke away to form the Communist Party of Italy. This changed the political landscape, as the remaining Socialist Party – diminished in numbers, but still the largest party in parliament – became more moderate and was therefore seen as a potential coalition partner for Giolitti's government. Such an alliance would have secured a large majority in parliament, ending the political deadlock and making effective government possible. To prevent this from happening, Mussolini offered to ally his Fascists with Giolitti instead, and Giolitti accepted, under the assumption that the small Fascist movement would make fewer demands and would be easier to keep in check than the much larger Socialists.

Mussolini and the Fascists thus joined a coalition formed of conservatives, nationalists and liberals, which stood against the left-wing parties (the socialists and the communists) in the Italian general election of 1921. As part of this coalition, the Fascists – who had previously claimed to be neither left nor right – identified themselves for the first time as the "extreme right", and presented themselves as the most radical right-wing members of the coalition. Mussolini talked about "imperialism" and "national expansion" as his main goals, and called for Italian domination of the Mediterranean Sea basin. The elections of that year were characterised by Fascist street violence and intimidation, which they used to suppress the socialists and communists and to prevent their supporters from voting, while the police and courts (under the control of Giolitti's government) turned a blind eye and allowed the violence to continue without legal consequences. About a hundred people were killed, and some areas of Italy came fully under the control of fascist squads, which did not allow known socialist supporters to vote or hold meetings. In spite of this, the Socialist Party still won the largest share of the vote and 122 seats in parliament, followed by the Catholic popolari with 107 seats. The Fascists only picked up 7 percent of the vote and 35 seats in parliament, but this was a large improvement compared to their results only two years earlier, when they had won no seats at all. Mussolini took these electoral gains as an indication that his right-wing strategy paid off, and decided that the Fascists would sit on the extreme right side of the amphitheatre where parliament met. He also used his first speech in parliament to take a "reactionary" stance, arguing against collectivisation and nationalisation, and calling for the post office and the railways to be given to private enterprise.

Prior to Fascism's accommodation of the political right, Fascism was a small, urban, northern Italian movement that had about a thousand members. After Fascism's accommodation of the political right, the Fascist movement's membership soared to approximately 250,000 by 1921.

The other lesson which Mussolini drew from the events of 1921 was about the effectiveness of open violence and paramilitary groups. The Fascists used violence even in parliament, for example by directly assaulting the communist deputy Misiano and throwing him out of the building on the pretext of having been a deserter during the war. They also openly threatened socialists with their guns in the chamber. They were able to do this with impunity, while the government took no action against them, hoping not to offend Fascist voters. Across the country, local branches of the National Fascist Party embraced the principle of squadrismo and organised paramilitary "squads" modeled after the arditi from the war. Mussolini claimed that he had "400,000 armed and disciplined men at his command" and did not hide his intentions of seizing power by force.

== See also ==
- History of fascism (1922–1945)
- History of fascism (1945–present)
- Fascism and ideology
- List of fascist movements
  - List of fascist movements by country
