= Consent of the governed =

Consent as source of political legitimacy

In political philosophy, consent of the governed is the idea that a government's legitimacy and moral right to use state power is justified and lawful only when consented to by the people or society over which that political power is exercised. This theory of consent is often contrasted with the divine right of kings and has often been invoked against the legitimacy of colonialism. Article 21 of the United Nations' 1948 Universal Declaration of Human Rights states that, "The will of the people shall be the basis of the authority of government."

== History ==
The idea that a law derives its validity from the approval of those subject to it can already be found in early Christian author Tertullian, who in his Apologeticum claims

It is not enough that a law is just, nor that the judge should be convinced of its justice; those from whom obedience is expected should have that conviction too.

The earliest utterance of the specific term "consent of the governed" seemingly appears in the writings of Scottish Catholic priest and Franciscan friar Duns Scotus, who proposed this in his work Ordinatio in the 1290s. Scotus's lengthy writing in theology have largely overshadowed this notable contribution that he made to early political theory. It is believed these writings influenced the Declaration of Arbroath in 1320.

In his 1937 book A History of Political Theory, George Sabine collected the views of many political theorists on consent of the governed. He notes the idea mentioned in 1433 by Nicholas of Cusa in De Concordantia Catholica. In 1579 an influential Huguenot tract Vindiciae contra tyrannos was published which Sabine paraphrases: "The people lay down the conditions which the king is bound to fulfill. Hence they are bound to obedience only conditionally, namely, upon receiving the protection of just and lawful government…the power of the ruler is delegated by the people and continues only with their consent." In England, the Levellers also held to this principle of government.

John Milton wrote

The power of kings and magistrates is nothing else, but what is only derivative, transferred and committed to them in trust from the people, to the common good of them all, in whom the power yet remains fundamentally, and cannot be taken from them, without a violation of their natural birthright.

Similarly, Sabine notes the position of John Locke in An Essay Concerning Human Understanding:

[Civic power] can have no right except as this is derived from the individual right of each man to protect himself and his property. The legislative and executive power used by government to protect property is nothing except the natural power of each man resigned into the hands of the community...and it is justified merely because it is a better way of protecting natural right than the self-help to which each man is naturally entitled.

However, with David Hume a contrary voice is heard. Sabine interprets Hume's skepticism by noting

The political world over, absolute governments which do not even do lip-service to the fiction of consent are more common than free governments, and their subjects rarely question their right except when tyranny becomes too oppressive.

Sabine revived the concept from its status as a political myth after Hume, by referring to Thomas Hill Green, who wrote that government required "will not force" for administration. As put by Sabine,

Even the most powerful and the most despotic government cannot hold a society together by sheer force; to that extent there was a limited truth to the old belief that governments are produced by consent.

According to James Feibleman, compliance with law is evidence for consent of the governed:

For a legal system to be consistent, it must be applicable; and for it to be complete, it must be compatible with the fundamental convictions of a majority of citizens. To say that an established legal order exists among them means that overtly they have consented to be governed in this fashion. Such public beliefs are embodied in institutions, first and foremost in the institution of the state, with its administration of law.

Consent of the governed, within the social liberalism of T. H. Green, was also described by Paul Harris:

The conditions for the existence of a political society have less to do with force and fear of coercion than with the members' mutual recognition of a good common to themselves and others, although it may not be consciously expressed as such. Thus for the conditions for any civil combination to disappear through resistance to a despotic government or disobedience to law would require such a disastrous upheaval as to be unlikely in all but the most extreme circumstances in which we might agree with Green that the price would be too high to pay, yet sufficiently rare to allow us to acknowledge that there would ordinarily be a moral duty to act to overthrow any state that did not pursue the common good.

== In the United States of America ==
"Consent of the governed" is a phrase found in the 1776 United States Declaration of Independence, written primarily by Thomas Jefferson.

Using thinking similar to that of John Locke, the founders of the United States believed in a state built upon the consent of "free and equal" citizens; a state otherwise conceived would lack legitimacy and rational-legal authority. This was expressed, among other places, in the 2nd paragraph of the Declaration of Independence (emphasis added):

We hold these truths to be self-evident, that all men are created equal, that they are endowed by their Creator with certain unalienable Rights, that among these are Life, Liberty and the pursuit of Happiness.--That to secure these rights, Governments are instituted among Men, deriving their just powers from the consent of the governed, --That whenever any Form of Government becomes destructive of these ends, it is the Right of the People to alter or to abolish it, and to institute new Government, laying its foundation on such principles and organizing its powers in such form, as to them shall seem most likely to effect their Safety and Happiness.

In section 6 of the Virginia Declaration of Rights, written in May, 1776, and passed in June, Founding Father George Mason wrote:

That elections of members to serve as representatives of the people, in assembly, ought to be free; and that all men, having sufficient evidence of permanent common interest with, the attachment to, the community, have the right of suffrage, and cannot be taxed or deprived of their property for public uses without their own consent, or that of their representatives so elected, nor bound by any law to which they have not, in like manner, assented, for the public good."

Although the Continental Congress at the outset of the American Revolution had no explicit legal authority to govern, it was delegated by the states with all the functions of a national government, such as appointing ambassadors, signing treaties, raising armies, appointing generals, obtaining loans from Europe, issuing paper money (i.e. continentals), and disbursing funds. The Congress had no authority to levy taxes, and was required to request money, supplies, and troops from the states to support the war effort. Individual states frequently ignored these requests. According to the Cyclopædia of Political Science. New York: Maynard, Merrill, and Co., 1899, commenting on the source of the Congress' power:

The appointment of the delegates to both these congresses was generally by popular conventions, though in some instances by state assemblies. But in neither case can the appointing body be considered the original depositary of the power by which the delegates acted; for the conventions were either self-appointed "committees of safety" or hastily assembled popular gatherings, including but a small fraction of the population to be represented, and the state assemblies had no right to surrender to another body one atom of the power which had been granted to them or to create a new power which should govern the people without their will. The source of the powers of congress is to be sought solely in the acquiescence of the people, without which every congressional resolution, with or without the benediction of popular conventions or state legislatures, would have been a mere brutum fulmen; and, as the congress unquestionably exercised national powers, operating over the whole country, the conclusion is inevitable that the will of the whole people is the source of the national government in the United States, even from its first imperfect appearance in the second continental congress...

The "consent of the governed" would expand over the next century and a half after the Constitution was ratified. The individual states determined voting requirements, which at first generally limited the franchise to all white men with property, but evolved to include women and people of color and removed property requirements.

== Types of consent ==
=== Unanimous consent ===
A key question is whether the unanimous consent of the governed is required; if so, this would imply the right of secession for those who do not want to be governed by a particular collective. All democratic governments today allow decisions to be made even over the dissent of a minority of voters which, in some theorists' view, calls into question whether said governments can rightfully claim, in all circumstances, to act with the consent of the governed.

=== Hypothetical consent ===
The theory of hypothetical consent of the governed holds that one's obligation to obey government depends on whether the government is such that one ought to consent to it, or whether the people, if placed in a state of nature without government, would agree to said government. This theory has been rejected by some scholars, who argue that since government itself can commit aggression, creating a government to safeguard the people from aggression would be similar to the people, if given the choice of what animals to be attacked by, trading "polecats and foxes for a lion", a trade that they would not make.

=== Engineered consent ===
According to the propagandist Edward Bernays when discussing public relations techniques that were described in his essay and book The Engineering of Consent (1955), the public may be manipulated by its subconscious desires to render votes to a political candidate. Consent thus obtained undermines the legitimacy of government. Bernays claimed that "the basic principle involved is simple but important: If the opinions of the public are to control the government, these opinions must not be controlled by the government."

Edward S. Herman and Noam Chomsky in their book, Manufacturing Consent (1988), advanced a propaganda model for the news media in the United States in which coverage of current events was skewed by corporations and the state in order to manufacture the consent of the governed.

== See also ==
- Bay'ah
- Consent of the Networked (2012)
- Mandate
- Popular sovereignty
- Public policy
- Rule of law
- Self determination
- Self-governance
- Social choice theory
- Social contract
- Taxation as theft
- Freeman on the land movement
