= Rebecca MacKinnon =

American activist and journalist

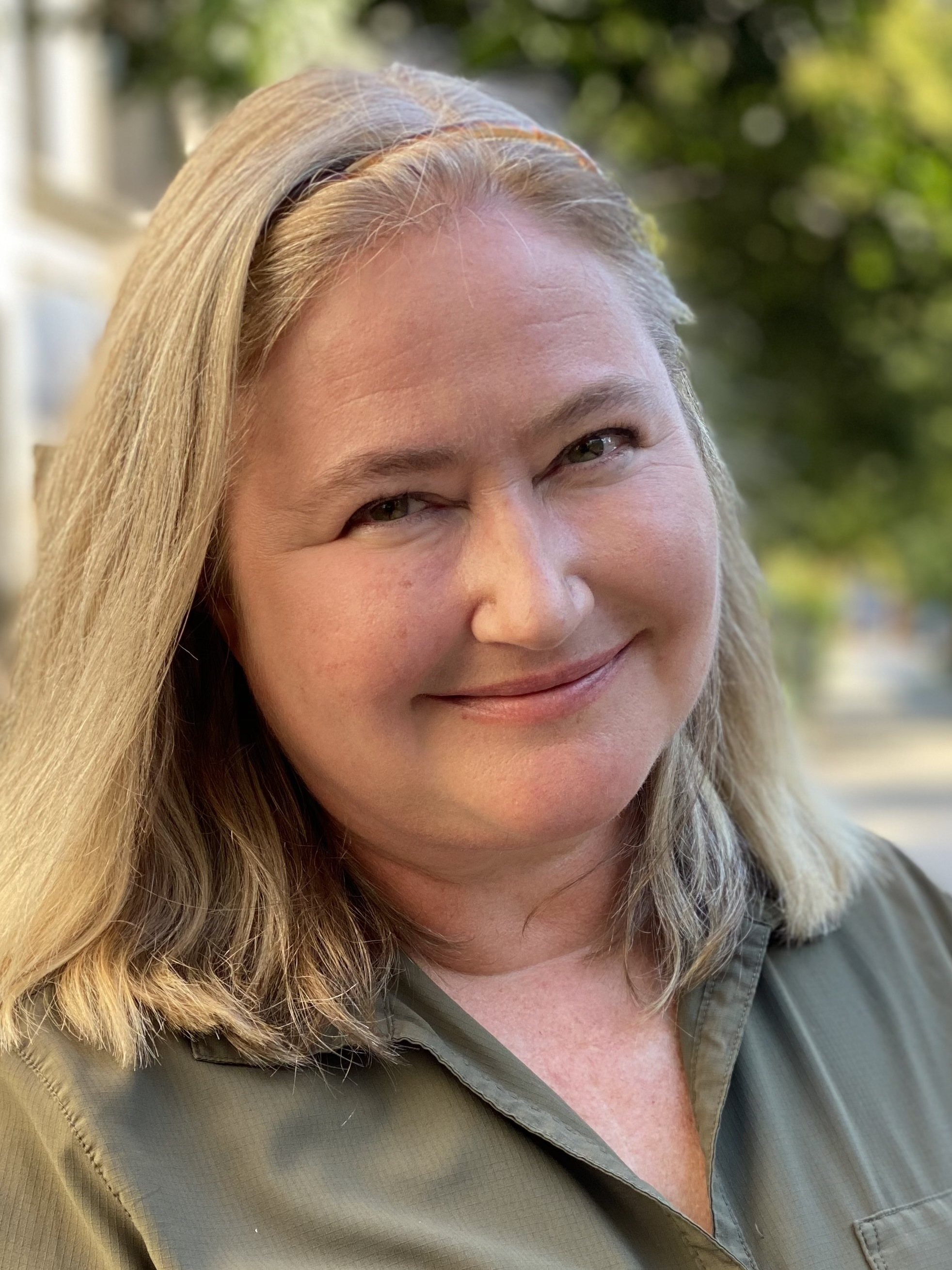
- MacKinnon in 2021
- Born: September 16, 1969 (age 57); Berkeley, California, U.S.
- Education: Harvard University (BA)
- Occupations: Journalist, author, researcher
- Awards: Goldsmith Book Prize

Rebecca MacKinnon (born September 16, 1969) is an American author, researcher, and Internet freedom advocate, and the co-founder of the citizen media network Global Voices. She is notable as a former CNN journalist who headed the CNN bureaus in Beijing and later in Tokyo. She was on the board of directors of the Committee to Protect Journalists from 2009 to 2022, a founding board member of the Global Network Initiative through 2014, the founding director of the Ranking Digital Rights project at the New America Foundation's Open Technology Institute, and was Vice President for Global Advocacy at the Wikimedia Foundation until late 2025. Since the start of 2026, she has been offering strategic consultancy and has returned to the Berkman Klein Center for Internet & Society as a research fellow; she has sat as an appointed member of the board of Wikimedia Europe since 2022 and, as of September 2026, is interim board secretary for Global Voices since its registration as a Netherlands non-profit in January 2026.

== Early life and education ==
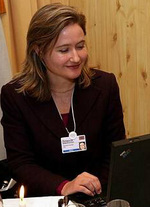
MacKinnon at the World Economic Forum, Davos, Switzerland, 2005

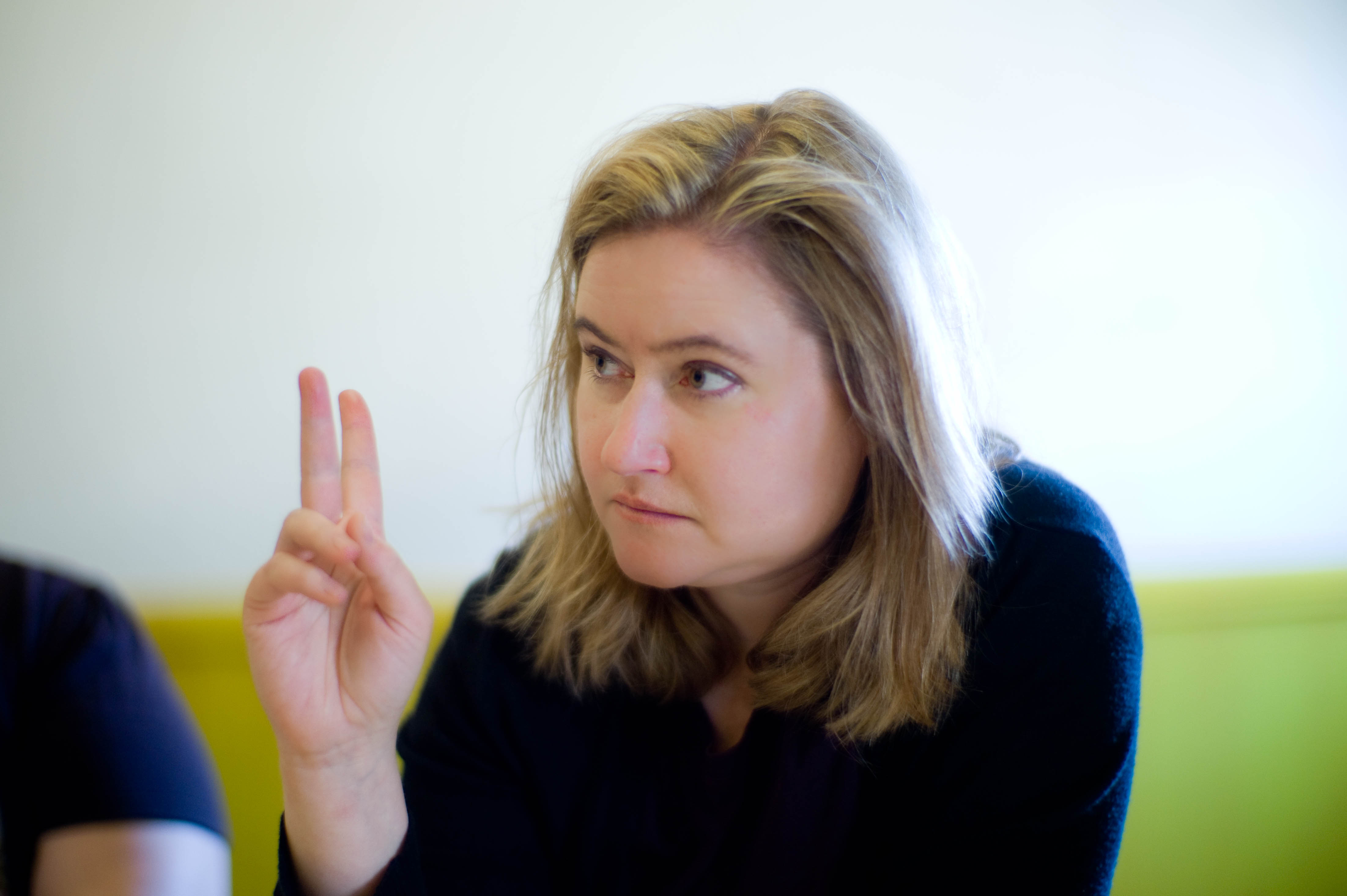
MacKinnon in 2010

MacKinnon was born in Berkeley, California. When she was three years old, MacKinnon's family moved to Tempe, Arizona, where her father, Stephen R. MacKinnon, had taken a job as Professor of Chinese History at Arizona State University. Her parents' academic research careers led her to pass most of her primary school years in Delhi, India, Hong Kong, and Beijing, China, before moving back to Arizona for middle and high school. She graduated from Tempe High in 1987.

She graduated magna cum laude from Harvard University in 1991 with a B.A. in government. After graduating, she served as a Fulbright scholar in Taiwan, where she also worked as a Newsweek stringer.

== Career ==
=== CNN ===
MacKinnon joined CNN in 1992 as Beijing Bureau Assistant and moved up to Producer/Correspondent by 1997 and Bureau Chief by 1998. In 2001 she became Tokyo Bureau Chief. During her time with CNN, she interviewed notable leaders including Junichiro Koizumi, Dalai Lama, Pervez Musharraf, and Mohammad Khatami.

=== Fellowships ===
In the spring of 2004, MacKinnon was a fellow of the Joan Shorenstein Center on the Press, Politics and Public Policy at Harvard Kennedy School. That summer, she joined Harvard Law School's Berkman Center for Internet & Society as a Research Fellow, where she remained until December 2006. Among her projects at the Berkman Center, MacKinnon founded Global Voices Online in collaboration with Ethan Zuckerman.

In January 2007, she joined the Journalism and Media Studies Center at the University of Hong Kong, where she remained until January 2009. From February 2009 to January 2010, she conducted research as an Open Society Fellow, funded by George Soros' Open Society Institute. Then in February 2010 she joined Princeton University's Center for Information Technology Policy where she was a visiting fellow, working on a book about the future of freedom in the Internet age. Regarding the Middle East, MacKinnon wrote that "the Internet empowers people and helps to bring about the peaceful changes associated with the Arab Spring".

In September 2010, MacKinnon became a Bernard L. Schwartz fellow at the New America Foundation. She is the Founding Director of the think tank's Ranking Digital Rights project which ranks the world's most powerful Internet, mobile, and telecommunications, companies on their respect for users' rights, with a focus on free expression and privacy.

=== Wikimedia ===
In January 2007, MacKinnon joined the inaugural Wikimedia Foundation Advisory Board, where she remained until December 2012.

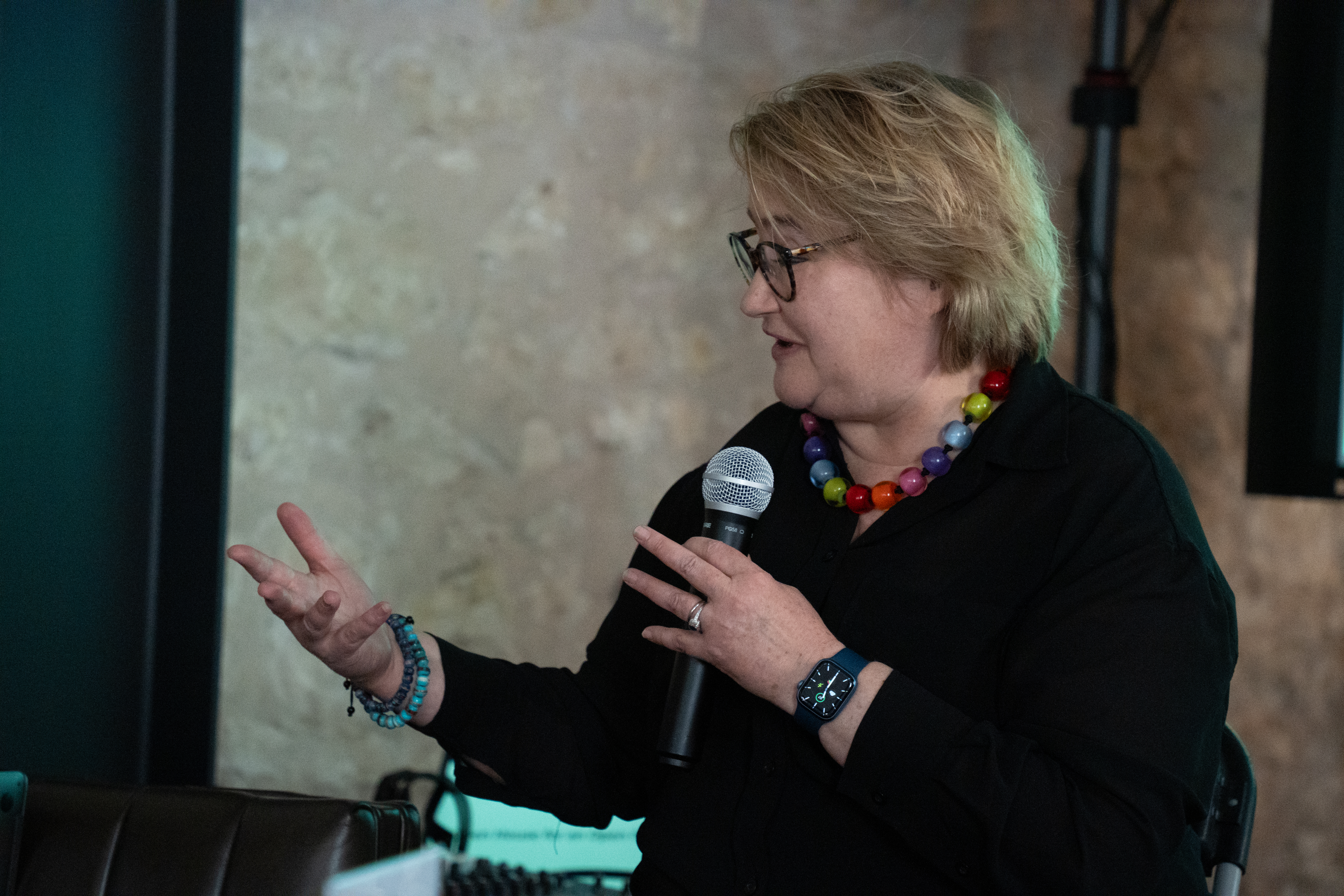
MacKinnon at SXSW 2025

In September 2021, MacKinnon joined the Foundation as its inaugural Vice President of Global Advocacy; she was compensated $290,118 in 2024 and $276,218 in 2023 for her role.

=== Consent of the Networked ===
MacKinnon's first book, Consent of the Networked: The Worldwide Struggle For Internet Freedom, was published by Basic Books in January 2012 and won the Goldsmith Book Prize. In an interview, she said that she argues in the book (among other things) that:

We cannot assume that the Internet will evolve automatically in a direction that is going to be compatible with democracy. It depends on how the technology is structured, governed, and used. Governments and corporations are working actively to shape the Internet to fit their own needs. The most insidious situations arise when both government and corporations combine their efforts to exercise power over the same people at the same time, in largely unconstrained and unaccountable ways. This is why I argue that if we the people do not wake up and fight for the protection of our own rights and interests on the Internet, we should not be surprised to wake up one day to find that they have been programmed, legislated, and sold away.
