= Consent of the Networked =

2012 book by Rebecca MacKinnon

Consent of the Networked: The Worldwide Struggle for Internet Freedom
- Author: Rebecca MacKinnon
- Subject: Internet censorship
- Publisher: Basic Books
- Publication date: 2012
- Publication place: United States
- Pages: 294
- ISBN: 978-0-465-02442-1

Consent of the Networked: The Worldwide Struggle for Internet Freedom is a book written by Rebecca MacKinnon and released in 2012. It discusses internet censorship and the ways in which companies which manage internet communication are assuming responsibilities formerly held by governments.

== Reviews ==
The review published in The Wall Street Journal described Consent of the Networked as "an excellent survey of the Internet's major fault lines". John Naughton's review in The Guardian said that the book will "find its way on to reading lists in political science" for those interested in the relationship between Internet and the government. Rachel Bridgewater's review in the Library Journal states, "She uses many real-life examples and anecdotes to illustrate the complex web of policy and technical infrastructure that allows governments and corporate interests to censor, surveil, and otherwise impede free expression and individual liberty."

== See also ==
- Consent of the governed
- Internet censorship
