= Georges Sorel =

French philosopher and sociologist (1847-1922)

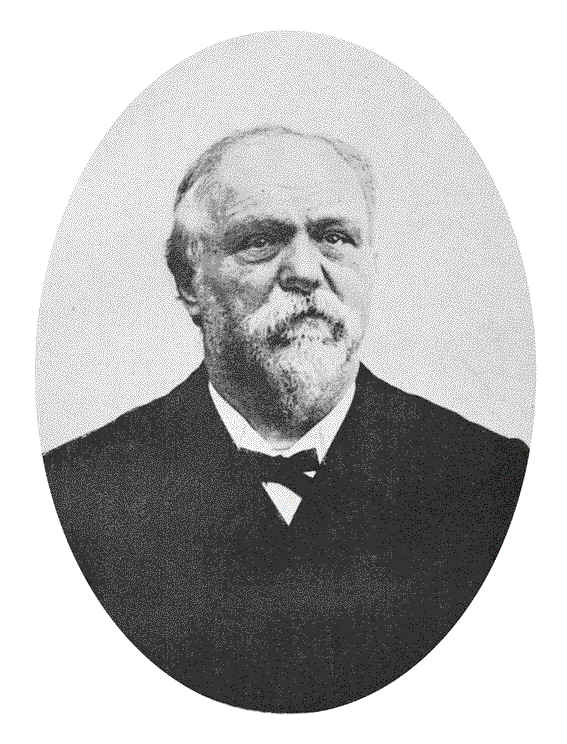
- Georges Sorel
- Born: Georges Eugène Sorel; 2 November 1847; Cherbourg, France
- Died: 29 August 1922 (aged 74); Boulogne-sur-Seine, France

Education
- Education: École Polytechnique

Philosophical work
- Era: Contemporary philosophy
- Region: Western philosophy: French philosophy
- School: Continental philosophy; Sorelianism; Revisionist Marxism; National syndicalism; Irrationalism
- Main interests: Science; Philosophy; Syndicalism; Activism
- Notable works: Reflections on Violence (1908)
- Notable ideas: Political myth; Anti-elitism

Georges Eugène Sorel (/səˈrɛl/; French: [ʒɔʁʒ øʒɛn sɔʁɛl]; 2 November 1847 – 29 August 1922) was a French social thinker, political theorist, historian, and later journalist. He has inspired theories and movements grouped under the name of Sorelianism. His social and political philosophy owed much to his reading of Proudhon, Fernand Pelloutier, Karl Marx, Giambattista Vico, Henri Bergson (whose lectures at the Collège de France he attended), and later William James. His notion of the power of myth in collective agency inspired socialists, anarchists, Marxists, and fascists. Together with his defense of violence, the power of myth is the contribution for which he is most often remembered.

Politically he evolved from his early liberal-conservative positions towards Marxism, social-democracy, and eventually syndicalism. Between 1909 and 1910 he was marginally involved with Charles Maurras' Action Française, and between 1911 and 1913 he wrote for the politically transversal L'Indépendance, established together with Édouard Berth – one of Sorel's main disciples – and Georges Valois, closer to Maurrassian circles. After a long silence during the war, Sorel came out in favour of Lenin and moved towards Bolshevist positions until his death in 1922.

His legacy in the interwar period embraced both ends of the political spectrum, as many former syndicalists welcomed the emerging fascism. According to historian Zeev Sternhell, Sorel's revision of Marxism broke the necessity of the link between revolution and working class, opening up the possibility of replacing the proletariat with the national community.

== Biography ==
Born in Cherbourg as the son of a businessman, he moved to Paris in 1864 to attend the Collège Rollin, before entering the École Polytechnique a year later. In 1869 he became chief engineer with the Department of Public Works. Stationed in Corsica until June 1871, he was subsequently posted to various places in southern France – Albi, Gap, and Draguignan. Between 1876 and 1879 he was in Mostaganem, in colonial Algeria, before moving to Perpignan, where he spent the last years of his career until his retirement in 1892. In 1891, he was awarded the Légion d'honneur. Immediately after retiring, he moved with his partner Marie David to Boulogne-sur-Seine, near Paris, where he stayed until his death in 1922.

Beginning in the second half of the 1880s, he published articles in various fields (hydrology, architecture, philosophy of science, psychophysics, political history, and philosophy) displaying the influence of Aristotle, as well as those of Hippolyte Taine and Ernest Renan. In 1893, he publicly announced his position as a Marxist and a socialist. He moved to working on some of France's first Marxist journals (L’Ère nouvelle and Le Devenir Social) and to participating, on the revisionist side, in the debate launched by Eduard Bernstein. A supporter of Alfred Dreyfus during the affaire, Sorel later was disappointed, much like his friend Charles Péguy, by the political consequences of the trial.

In the beginning of the 20th century, he began arguing for the incompatibility between socialism and parliamentary democracy, moving towards syndicalist positions. Through his writings in Enrico Leone's Il Divenire sociale and Hubert Lagardelle's Mouvement socialiste, he contributed around 1905 to the theoretical elaboration of revolutionary syndicalism. In 1905, his most famous text, Reflections on Violence, began appearing in the Divenire Sociale. It was published in book form in 1908 by Pages Libres, and was followed the same year by The Illusions of Progress.

In the years before the First World War, Sorel increasingly explored the possibility of a synthesis between revolutionary syndicalism and certain forms of nationalism. As early as 1906 he was in contact with Italian syndicalists who, alongside nationalist thinkers such as Enrico Corradini, sought to unite proletarian militancy with a project of national regeneration. Sorel acknowledged that Corradini had drawn upon his ideas in developing a doctrine of “national syndicalism,” writing to Benedetto Croce in 1909 that Corradini “understands exceedingly well the value of my ideas.”

By 1910 Sorel also expressed admiration for aspects of the nationalist thought of Charles Maurras and Charles Péguy, interpreting the national idea as a potential “myth” capable of mobilizing collective energies toward moral and social renewal. This led him to a brief and ambivalent involvement with circles around Action Française and publications such as the Cité Française, though he did not adopt Maurras’s monarchism or integral nationalism.

Ferociously opposed to the 1914 Union sacrée political truce, Sorel denounced the war and in 1917 praised the Russian Revolution. He wrote for an official Soviet Union publication, Russian Soviet Government Bureau, calling Lenin "the greatest theoretician of socialism since Marx and a statesman whose genius recalls that of Peter the Great." He wrote numerous small pieces for Italian newspapers defending the Bolsheviks. Sorel also spoke of Mussolini in strikingly heroic terms, describing him as a "leader of a consecrated battalion, saluting the flags of Italy with his sword. He is an Italian of the fifteenth century, a condottiere. He is the only man with the strength to correct the weakness of the government."

== Sorel's Marxism ==
Though Sorel engaged with Marxism for almost his entire time as an active intellectual, his belonging to the Marxist tradition is contested. Often associated with an heroic, apocalyptic, and ultimately aesthetic Marxism, Sorel is by some (for example, Hannah Arendt, 'On Violence') thought more as a thinker of decadence. Nonetheless, analysis of his engagement with Marx show him to be preoccupied more with the epistemological subtleties of historical materialism than with an impending moral collapse. Absorbing the twin influences of Henri Bergson and Italian idealists, Sorel elaborated a Marxism rejecting economic and historical determinism, and seeing itself not as social science but as a historically-situated ideology.

=== Anti-determinism ===
Though Sorel had been a moderate conservative before turning to Marxism in the 1890s, his interest in the doctrine was dictated by scientific more than by political motivations. In a context in which Marx's work remained relatively unknown and obscure, Sorel sought to develop the theory in order to prove that, as he wrote to Benedetto Croce in 1895, "socialism is worthy of belonging to the modern scientific movement". This involved rejecting the standard French objections to Marxism: historical and economic determinism.

Through readings of Giambattista Vico and exchanges with Antonio Labriola and Benedetto Croce, Sorel came to an understanding of Marxism as a theory of class agency embedded in institutions. Given the essential creativity of the collective agency at the heart of historical development, it followed that Marxism was unable to formulate predictions based on supposed laws of historical development: "History," wrote Sorel in 1897, "is entirely in the past; there is no way of transforming it into a logical combination allowing us to predict the future." Moreover, the unfolding of this collective creative agency could not be entirely deduced by the material conditions in which it took place, but had to take into account legal, ideological, and cultural factors. As he wrote in 1898:

Nor do I believe that it is in conformity with a Marxist spirit to decompose facts into various elements: economic ones first, subsequently juridical and political ones. ... It is in the form that the distinction can be established, but only for our intellectual necessities; in history, as well as in reason, we have unity; but in order to carry on a scientific study, it is necessary to establish classifications.

=== Reformism and syndicalism ===
These theoretical preferences yielded a mildly voluntaristic Marxism. While rejecting, first on scientific and later on political grounds, the inevitability of capitalist collapse, and arguing against the possibility of laws of history in virtue of his agency-based view of social development, he nonetheless tendentially rejected insurrectionary politics. He insisted, instead, on the institutional development of the proletariat, on the capacity of unions to become not only sites of resistance to capital, but more importantly spaces in which new, post-capitalist social relations could emerge.

To reduce unions to being mere associations of resistance means opposing a formidable barrier to the development of the proletariat; it means putting it at the mercy of the influence of bourgeois demagogues; it means preventing it from elaborating the principles of a new right in line with its way of life; it is, in one word, to deny to the proletariat the possibility of becoming a class for itself.

While until 1900 he had believed that this path of institutional development was best served through political engagement in parliamentary democracy, his ideas changed in the beginning of the century. Partly in reaction to the republican triumph in the 1902 French elections, and partly in virtue of new analyses on the emergence of welfare capitalism, he now believed that prolonged involvement in bourgeois parliamentarism would spell the death of the revolutionary working class. He thus elaborated a change of strategy, linked to the new circumstances. Since class is not produced by the evolution of capitalist economy, then a sustained practice of highly ideologically-charged social conflict—the grève prolétarienne—can maybe restore the conditions ideal for a revolutionary working class to thrive. As he explained in the Reflections on Violence:

Marx supposed that the bourgeoisie had no need to be incited to employ force; but we are faced with a new and very unforeseen fact: a bourgeoisie which seeks to weaken its own strength. Must we believe that the Marxist conception is dead? By no means, because proletarian violence comes upon the scene at the very moment when the conception of social peace claims to moderate disputes; proletarian violence confines employers to their role as producers and tends to restore the class structure just when they seemed on the point of intermingling in the democratic morass.

== Sorel's epistemology ==
Generally seen as a representative of fin de siècle irrationalism, Sorel's epistemological thinking is more accurately characterized as anti-positivist and increasingly moving towards a proto-pragmatist position.

=== Early epistemology ===
Though always extremely critical of mechanistic explanations and conflicted over the implications of deterministic approaches, Sorel, until the mid-1890s, was a scientific realist. As such, he argued against a conventionalist reading of the implications of non-Euclidean geometries, suggesting that geometry is an empirical and cumulative science. His early epistemological thought can be seen as an attempt to balance this scientific realism with the doubts over determinism and the desire to vindicate human agency. This act of balancing was achieved in his 1894 "Ancienne et Nouvelle Métaphysique". In this text, Sorel established a dualism between a deterministic natural milieu and an essentially free artificial milieu. Science belongs to the latter, and its history testifies it: all the numerous conceptual and material tools developed by scientists to enquire upon nature, all the changes that occurred in the history of science demonstrate the human creativity and historical situatedness which lie at the heart of science. Drawing upon Henri Bergson's Time and Free Will, he elaborated a theory of human freedom not as exemption from natural determinism but as creative capacity: "We are free in the sense that we can construct tools that have no model in the cosmic environment; we do not alter the laws of nature, but we are capable of creating sequences whose ordering is our decision"

At the same time, however, experimental practice provided to science an anchoring into the deterministic cosmic milieu, and hence could safeguard scientific realism. Experiments for Sorel do not correspond to natural conditions of observation: they are highly constructed observational settings which, nonetheless, allow a contact with nature and thus are suitable for the construction of predictive laws. Industrial practice is the initial setting of this experimental activity, which then moves on to greater refinement and abstraction in scientific laboratories. Through this conceptualisation of the experimental nature of science, Sorel can thus avoid the conventionalist implications to which his theory of the "artificial milieu" push him: "I did not only say that science is social; for one could conclude that I give the name of science to a number of widespread prejudices held by everyone; I have no intention of going back to the old mistake of universal consensus."

=== Vico and social science ===
This dualistic framework resisted until Sorel attempted to tackle the epistemological issues of the human and social sciences. As long as laws could be extracted from the deterministic natural milieu, Sorel's scientific realism was safe. But as soon as the problem of a science of society confronted him, the tensions in his epistemology reached breaking point: given that such a science must, by definition, be the science of the artificial, creatively constructed, realm, how will it be possible to extract laws from such an unpredictable environment? Sorel's initial answer is to look for pockets of deterministic behaviour inside of the social world. Thus, in his 1892 essay on Proudhon and the science of economics, Sorel argues that while individual labour is scientifically imponderable, it assumes regular, law-like, behaviour when taken collectively, and commends Proudhon for making this point: "...in the notion of value, Proudhon gets rid of all these anti-scientific elements: products are classified not according to fancies and individual claims, but according to their position in social production." He however began to express increasing uneasiness about these deterministic solutions. In his review of Émile Durkheim's Rules of Sociological Method, he expressed serious reservations about idealtypic and statistical reasonings in the social sciences, arguing that "what is striking in the human milieu is that which is human, that is to say action considered from the perspective of the agent".

To capture this collective agency in a social scientific way, Sorel had to abandon his notion of scientific explanation in terms of deterministic laws. That, he could do thanks to the reading of the work of Italian philosopher Giambattista Vico, whose epistemology of verum ipsum factum allowed Sorel to develop an alternative account of what a scientific explanation consists in. Instead of highlighting a deterministic causal nexus, explanations in the social sciences would now be concerned with accounting for how a creative agent produces. As Sorel noted, this furnishes the epistemological grounding on which a social scientific enterprise can stand, provided that it renounces notions of atemporal laws of historical development and it focuses instead on the situated, contextual, explanation of human collective agency.

=== Marxism and pragmatism ===
In the decade following the 1896 publication of his "Study on Vico", Sorel was more absorbed by political and strategic considerations than by epistemological questions. Much of the anti-deterministic force of his epistemology found a fruitful channel of expression in Sorel's efforts to revise Marxism in a more agency-oriented fashion. Nonetheless, as early as the "Study on Vico", he had become aware of the relativistic implications of his epistemology:

Thus ideal history has perished, overcome by the development of historical research. It is now nothing but a memory... In natural science as well there is a similar sort of problem that contemporary philosophy has shown itself equally powerless to resolve. Critique of the idea of divinity has shaken the foundations of all knowledge that drew its certitude from the ancient idea of “God in nature.” Science no longer seems, today, safe from contingency, the fixed point has disappeared. It is enough to read the titles of contemporary theses on understanding and contingency to understand how it preoccupies reflective minds. Neither does it seem easy to respond to those who want to know where law [droit] finds its place in materialist conceptions of history. The difficulty is the same as above: law that is immutable and rests in the divine Idea has disappeared as has science possessed totally by God. Nothing is served by denying the difficulties that result from these new principles, but this is not a reason to revive famously incorrect doctrines.

By the end of the first decade of the century, Sorel encounters American pragmatism, which he initially looked to with suspicion. In the first edition of his The Illusions of Progress, he calls pragmatism the "last term of bourgeois philosophy", adding that its popularity was due to its "flexibility, its garrulousness, and the cynicism of its success". Soon enough, however, a more in-depth acquaintance with the work of William James changed Sorel's opinion. He started calling himself a pragmatist and tried to remedy some of the relativistic consequences of James' theory of truth. His last major work in the philosophy of science was called the "Utility of Pragmatism". In it, Sorel sketched a theory of knowledge as always and irredemably situated, going close to denying the possibility of knowledge of the natural milieu.

"For some time now, a number of distinguished men of learning have observed that their studies examined not so much a world which is given to man, but that which man creates in the world. Many of those who have reflected on this situation have concluded that since it is not possible to apprehend natural nature, one must be happy with insights capable of charming the imagination, with conventions useful to give a clear exposition of facts, or with empirical rules convenient for improving the practice of the usual arts. We would thus be condemned to abandon the idea of certainty which dominated ancient science. But the pragmatist declares that artificial nature interests our life at least as much as natural nature. He admires its fecondity, which appears to him as infinitely growing. He asks himself how man can have such nonsensical ambitions to believe that artificial nature would not suffice to fully occupy his genius."

== Works ==
- Contribution à l'Étude Profane de la Bible (Paris, 1889).
- Le Procès de Socrate, Examen Critique des Thèses Socratiques (Paris: Alcan, 1889).
- Questions de Morale (Paris, 1900).
- L'avenir socialiste des syndicats (Paris, 1901).
- La Ruine du Monde Antique: Conception Matérialiste de l'Histoire (Paris, 1902).
- Introduction à l'Économie Moderne (Paris, 1903).
- La Crise de la Pensée Catholique (Paris, 1903).
- Le Système Historique de Renan (Paris, 1905–1906).
- Les Préoccupations Métaphysiques des Physiciens Modernes (Paris, 1907).
- La Décomposition du Marxisme (Paris, 1908); translation as The Decomposition of Marxism by Irving Louis Horowitz in his Radicalism and the Revolt against Reason; The Social Theories of Georges Sorel (Humanities Press, 1961; Southern Illinois University Press, 1968).
- Les Illusions du Progrès (1908); Translated as The Illusions of Progress by John and Charlotte Stanley with a foreword by Robert A. Nisbet and an introduction by John Stanley (University of California Press, 1969, ISBN 0-520-02256-4).
- Réflexions sur la Violence (1908); translated as Reflections on Violence first authorised translation by T. E. Hulme (B. W. Huebsch, 1914; P. Smith, 1941; AMS Press, 1975, ISBN 0-404-56165-9); in an unabridged republication with an introduction by Edward A. Shils, translated by T. E. Hulme and J. Roth (The Free Press, 1950; Dover Publications, 2004, ISBN 0-486-43707-8, pbk.); edited by Jeremy Jennings (Cambridge University Press, 1999, ISBN 0-521-55117-X, hb).
- La Révolution Dreyfusienne (Paris, 1909).
- Matériaux d'une Théorie du Prolétariat (Paris, 1919).
- De l'Utilité du Pragmatisme (Paris, 1921).
- Lettres à Paul Delesalle 1914-1921 (Paris, 1947).
- D'Aristote à Marx (L'Ancienne et la Nouvelle Métaphysique) (Paris: Marcel Rivière, 1935).
- From Georges Sorel: Essays in Socialism and Philosophy edited with an introduction by John L. Stanley, translated by John and Charlotte Stanley (Oxford University Press, 1976, ISBN 0-19-501715-3; Transaction Books, 1987, ISBN 0-88738-654-7, pbk.).
- From Georges Sorel: Volume 2, Hermeneutics and the Sciences edited by John L. Stanley, translated by John and Charlotte Stanley (Transaction Publishers, 1990, ISBN 0-88738-304-1).
- Commitment and Change: Georges Sorel and the idea of revolution essay and translations by Richard Vernon (University of Toronto Press, 1978, ISBN 0-8020-5400-5).
- Social Foundations of Contemporary Economics translated with an introduction by John L. Stanley from Insegnamenti Sociali dell'Economia Contemporanea (Transaction Books, 1984, ISBN 0-87855-482-3, cloth).

== See also ==
- Charter of Amiens, a 1906 cornerstone of the French workers' movement
- Fascist syndicalism
