= Habsburg myth =

Political myth in Central and Eastern Europe glorifying Habsburg rule

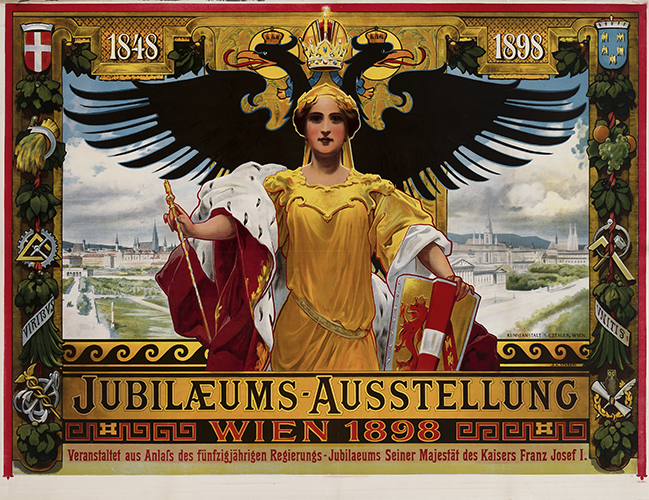
Poster announcing a Vienna exhibition for the 50 year anniversary of emperor Franz Joseph I, 1898

The Habsburg myth (German: Habsburgischer Mythos or Habsburgmythos; Italian: Mito asburgico) is a political myth or nostalgia present in the historiography and literature of some Central and Eastern European countries, particularly in Austria, which glorifies certain elements of Habsburg dynastic rule. The concept was coined by the Italian Germanist Claudio Magris in his 1963 thesis Il mito asburgico nella letteratura austriaca moderna ("The Habsburg myth in modern Austrian literature"). Magris notes three specific elements of the myth, particularly as it manifests in literature: (1) a benign, "kakanian" bureaucracy which nobly strove to maintain multi-ethnic cohesion in the empire, (2) Franz Josef as an embodiment of the "imperial ideal" nonetheless inclined towards "heroic mediocrity", and finally (3) the "sensuous and pleasure-loving hedonism" of the Viennese scene as represented in Die Fledermaus.

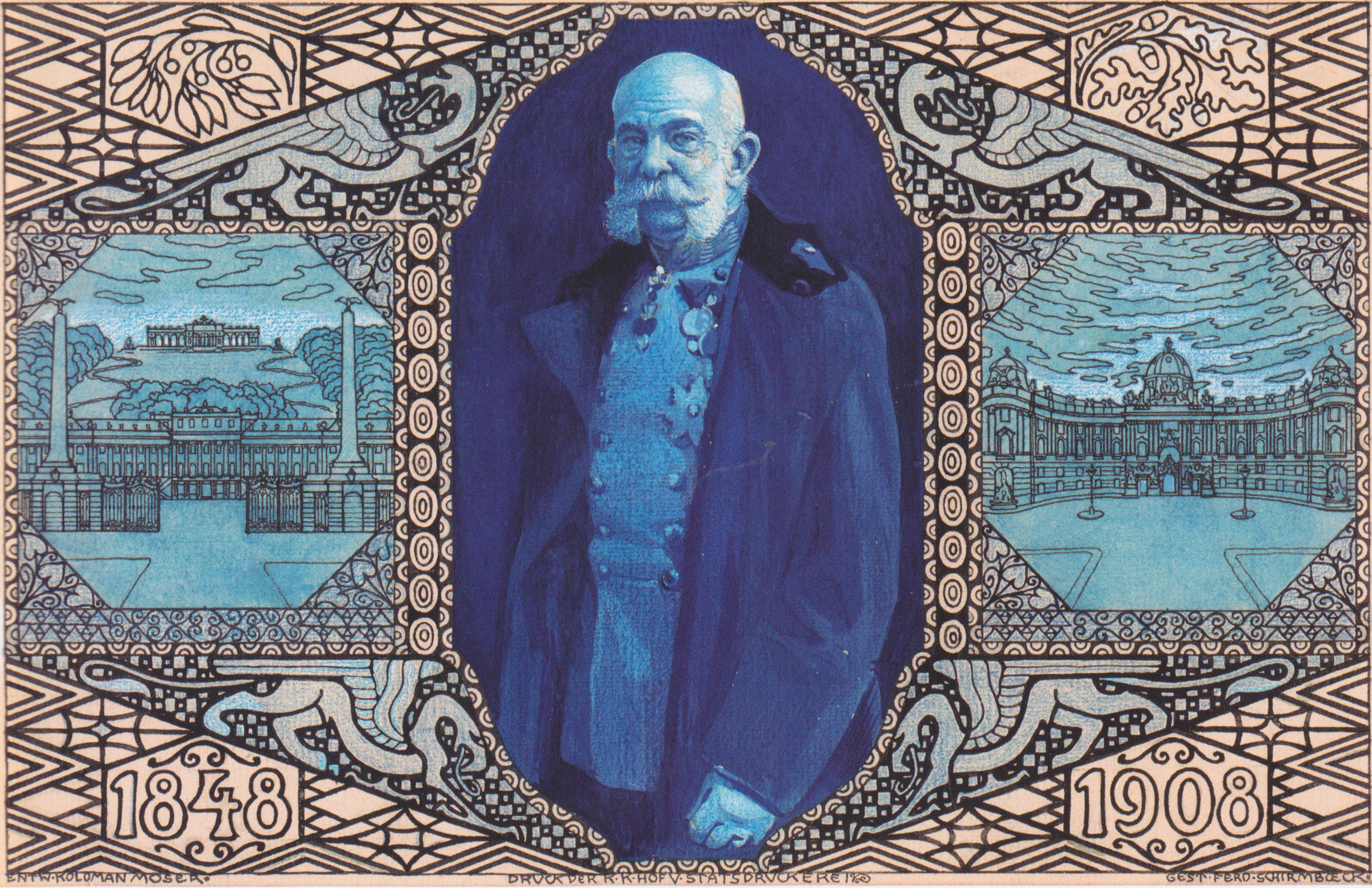
Postcard commemorating the diamond jubilee of Franz Joseph I by Koloman Moser (1908)

In his thesis, Magris identified the myth, and discussion of fin de siècle imperial culture in general, as an Austrian phenomenon, but both have spread abroad in the decades following the thesis's publication, particularly through books released in the late 1970s and 80s such as Fin-de-siècle Vienna. For his part, Magris labels Viennese modernism, a key element of the myth, as "fundamentally backwards-looking". Some important novelists that helped the emergence of what is nowadays referred to as the Habsburg myth were Stefan Zweig, Robert Musil, and Joseph Roth.

The myth or nostalgia related to the pre-1918 situation can be found among liberals as well as conservatives. The liberal tendency longed for the (perceived) multi-ethnic or non-nationalist character of the old monarchy. It has also been related to the current European Union (EU), as some early proponents of European integration and a pan-European identity were inspired in Habsburg Monarchy.

== See also ==
- Sissi (film), a 1955 movie set in the Habsburg Dynasty.
- The World of Yesterday, a book which nostalgically portrays Habsburg rule.
