= Political myth =

Ideological narrative believed by social groups

A political myth is an ideological narrative that is believed by social groups.

== Definition ==
In 1975, Henry Tudor defined it in the book Political Myth. He said that myths are believed to be true even if they may be false, and they are devices with dramatic constructions used "in order to come to grips with reality". Political myths simply deal with political topics and always use a group of people as the hero or protagonist. In 2001, Christopher G. Flood described a working definition of a political myth as "an ideologically marked narrative which purports to give a true account of a set of past, present, or predicted political events and which is accepted as valid in its essentials by a social group".

In 1946, Ernst Cassirer recounted political theory in his The Myth of the State.

In 1973, T. L. Thorson wrote in the 4th edition of A History of Political Theory: "It is the mark of a modern mind to be able to explicitly create a 'myth' as a way of influencing others (as, for example, Plato does in The Republic). In its original sense myth is a literal description."

== Function ==
According to Tudor, what recasts myth as political in nature is its subject matter, that being politics. In order for a political narrative to be recast as myth, the narrative of events must be cast in dramatic form and it must serve a practical argument.

Tudor defines dramatic form, stating "there is indeed a critical event by reference to which men can order their present experience but the events in question are thought of as taken place in the past." The function of political myth can be better understood when it is broken down into the following components: (1) myth provides the theoretical argument, which is incorporated into an (2) ideology that supports the myth by providing a practical argument.

Myths often have a protagonist/heroic figure that represents a particular community destined to create a morally coherent world which orients the community's activities towards this end. Mythopoeic narratives in political discourse can range from origin stories (foundation myths) that recount the establishment of a community, to ascribing a political existence to a community based in the future (often a utopic vision), to restoring a political community that has ceased to exist.

Although, both myth and ideology carry certain values and beliefs, ideology provides a practical argument rooted in rendering the community's past experiences as coherent, allowing them to make sense of their present circumstances and often, as a result, providing communities with objectives for future activities. A myth is considered a political myth when the narrative provides an ideologically marked account of the past, present, and future of the political community. By ideologically marked, the narrative carries "assumptions, values, and goals associated with a specific ideology… that conveys an implicit invitation to assent to a particular ideological standpoint."

In short, political myths offer "an account of the past and the future in the light of which the present can be understood." A political myth's success is dependent on the practical argument being accepted as true.

== Examples ==
Examples cited as political myths include Manifest Destiny, Liberal international order, The Clash of Civilizations, and national myths.

== See also ==
- Georges Sorel
- Communist symbolism
- Civil religion
- Founding myth
- Habsburg myth
- National symbol
- Noble lie
- Political religion
- Political symbolism
- Socialist heraldry
