= Richard Vernon (academic) =

Canadian political scientist (born 1945)

- Born: January 18, 1945 (age 80)

Philosophical work
- Era: Contemporary philosophy
- Region: Western philosophy
- Main interests: Political philosophy, Global justice, Cosmopolitanism, History of Political Thought in France and Britain, Contemporary Political Theory, pluralism

Richard Vernon is a Canadian academic and from 1981 he has been Professor of Political Science at the University of Western Ontario.

Professor Vernon was awarded a B.A. in Historical Tripos in 1966 and in 1970 an M.A., both at the University of Cambridge. He was awarded his Ph.D. at the London School of Economics.

His work The Career of Toleration: John Locke, Jonas Proast, and After was awarded the Canadian Political Science Association's C.B. Macpherson Prize for the best Canadian book in political theory. His current work concerns the global and temporal contexts of justice. In the global context, Professor Vernon is particularly concerned with the relationship between civic and cosmopolitan obligations. In the temporal context, he continues to work on issues of historical redress, and is now exploring the idea of duties in relation to future generations.

== Works ==
- Commitment and Change: Georges Sorel and the Idea of Revolution (University of Toronto Press, 1978).
- The Principle of Federation by P.-J. Proudhon [translation, with critical introduction and notes], (University of Toronto Press, 1979, pp. xlvii, 86)
- Citizenship and Order: Studies in French Political Thought (University of Toronto Press, 1986).
- Unity, Plurality and Politics: Essays in Honour of F.M. Barnard, J.M. Porter and Richard Vernon eds., (Croom Helm, 1986, pp. 194)
- The Career of Toleration: John Locke, Jonas Proast, and After (McGill-Queen's University Press, 1997).
- Political Morality: A Theory of Liberal Democracy (Continuum, 2001).
- Friends, Citizens, Strangers: Essays on Where We Belong (University of Toronto Press, 2005).
- Bringing Power to Justice: Prospects of the International Criminal Court Co-edited with Joanna Harrington and Michael Milde, (Montreal: Mc-Gill-Queen's University Press, 2006, pp. 288)
- Explaining the Breakdown of Ethnic Relations: Why Neighbours Kill Co-edited with Victoria Esses, (Malden MA: Blackwell, 2008, pp. 272)
- Cosmopolitan Regard: Political Membership and Global Justice (Cambridge University Press, 2010).
- Accountability for Collective Wrongdoing Co-edited with Tracy Isaacs, (New York, Cambridge University Press, 2011, pp. 310)
- Historical Redress: Must We Pay for the Past? (London: Continuum, 2012, pp. 172)
- Permissible Progeny? The Morality of Procreation and Parenting Co-edited with Sarah Hannan and Samantha Brennan, (New York: Oxford University Press, 2015, pp. 282)

== Awards ==
- Canada Council Leave Fellowship (1976–77)
- The C.B. Macpherson Prize (Canadian Political Science Association), 1998
- The Hellmuth Prize for Distinction in Research (UWO), 2005
- The Edward G. Pleva Award for Excellence in Teaching (UWO), 2008
- Distinguished University Professor (UWO), 2009
- University Students’ Council Honour Roll (UWO), 2008 - 2012
