= Reflections on Violence =

1908 French-language book by Georges Sorel

- Author: Georges Sorel
- Original title: Réflexions sur la violence
- Language: French
- Publication date: 1908
- Publication place: France
- English publication date: 1912
- Preceded by: The Decomposition of Marxism

Reflections on Violence (French: Réflexions sur la violence), published in 1908, is a book by the French revolutionary syndicalist Georges Sorel on class struggle and revolution. Sorel is known for his theory that political revolution depends on the proletariat organizing violent uprisings and strikes to institute syndicalism, an economic system in which syndicats (self-organizing groups of only proletarians) truly represent the needs of the working class.

One of Sorel's most controversial claims was that violence could save the world from "barbarism". He equated violence with life, creativity, and virtue. This served as the foundation for fascism as it broke away from its international socialism roots to become nationalistic.

In this book, he contends that myths are important as "expressions of will to act". He also supports the creation of an economic system run by and for the interests of producers rather than consumers. His ideas were influenced by various other philosophical writers, including Giambattista Vico, Blaise Pascal, Ernest Renan, Friedrich Nietzsche, Eduard von Hartmann, Pierre-Joseph Proudhon, John Henry Newman, Karl Marx, and Alexis de Tocqueville.

Sorel makes an important note on the purpose of the work in his introduction: "I am not at all concerned to justify the perpetrators of violence, but to inquire into the function of violence of the working classes in contemporary Socialism."

== Social reformism and the "specter of revolution" ==
Sorel often throughout the Reflections takes a highly-skeptical tone toward the French parliamentary socialist reformers of the late 19th and early 20th centuries like statesmen Jean Jaurès, Édouard Vaillant, Georges Clemenceau, and Alexander Millerand. It is of Sorel's opinion that such politicians were more interested in careerism than social revolution, hence he came to regard their occasionally more radical rhetoric (usually involving the declaration of strikes) as an attempt to shore up votes and intimidate their conservative party opposition, nothing more. Sorel goes on to say that, of revolution, "that the middle classes allow themselves to be plundered quite easily [by the parliamentary socialist politicians via taxation], provided that little pressure is brought to bear, and that they are intimidated by the fear of revolution; that [reformist] party will possess the future which can most skillfully manipulate the specter of revolution..." Sorel took issue with the custom of degenerating the methods working-class resistance, especially that of strikes (Sorel was, notably, a syndicalist), into a tool of electoral strategy to scare the conservative politicians and middle classes into making economic or political concessions.

Sorel contested that these socialist politicians, which he ironically refers to on multiple instances as France's "worthy progressives," are utopians. Sorel's definition of utopia, however, is not in the usual sense of the term: "A Utopia is, [as opposed to the revolutionary movement], an intellectualist product." What Sorel goes on to explain is that utopias are a rationalist approach to social problems; it conforms society to the intellect by drawing up grand schemas for how to alleviate the suffering of the masses before the act itself. In this sense, Sorel identifies the reformists squarely as utopians. After taking apart the issues of society piecemeal and planning the resolutions for each, they are to "be fitted into approaching legislation."

It is not only the socialist statesmen that Sorel identifies utopian thought, he sees it as a larger intellectual trend that occupies multiple disciplines. For this reason, Sorel states that "Liberal political economy is one of the best examples of a utopia that could be given" owing to its promises of universal meritocracy and wealth for the working class by the laws of perfect competition by the capitalist market. (It is of note that Sorel opposes "Utopia's," which are inspired by the intellectual-rationalist tradition, with the spontaneous "revolutionary movement" that is motivated by myths—this is more heavily explored below on the subsection concerning myths.)

== "Dictatorship of incapacity" and class decadence ==
Sorel uses the phrase "dictatorship of incapacity" to term a state of decadence in capitalist society where, in his view, the two classes of society, proletarian and bourgeois, lose all of their class energies: "Before the working class also could accept this 'dictatorship of incapacity,' it must itself become as stupid as the middle class, and must lose all revolutionary energy, at the same time that its masters will have lost all capitalistic energy." Sorel holds that what historically made the capitalist system so powerful and great was the unapologetic spirit of the capitalists to act as "captains of industry," conquering the world through industrial dynamism. This uncompromising spirit motivated the proletariat, for Sorel, into violence against their economic masters and thus forced both classes to reach a high moral ethic or to be truly sublime: in tune with the position of each class in dangerous relation to the other. He praises the capitalists of the past who were "animated by their conquering, insatiable, and pitiless spirit" as opposed to the modern "middle class, led astray by the chatter of the preachers of ethics and sociology, return to an ideal of conservative mediocrity, seek to correct the abuses of economics, and wish to break with the barbarism of their predecessors..." Here Sorel is attacking the "progressive" bourgeoisie and their liberal parties that preach for charitable policy.

It is mentioned by Sorel, however, that this period of decadence can be rejuvenated by proletarian violence, which will act in an uncompromising manner with the capitalist class and break them of their modern philanthropic and charitable attitudes towards the poor. Sorel says, "the role of violence in history appears singularly great... as to awaken them [i.e. the middle class] to a sense of their own class sentiment." Sorel maintains that proletarian violence "tends to restore the separation of classes" which had undergone erasure in the prevailing humanitarian ethic of joyful coexistence. Needless to say, Sorel takes great pains with liberalism as a pacifying historical phenomenon; only could proletarian violence in the name of the class war reinvigorate capitalism's lost war-like spirit. Of mention, too, is Sorel's opinion that the syndicalist general strike, spontaneous and invigorating, is the most trustworthy method of bringing about this redemptive violence.

== Proletarian violence and bourgeois force ==
Sorel makes the argument that the coercion employed by the bourgeoisie in the formation of early capitalist history through the state (colonialism, chattel slavery, the eviction of peasants, imperialism, etc.) is not violence per se but force. Violence is spontaneous, criminal, and illegitimate to the current state-power. Force, on the other hand, is the movement of the state which is organized, legal, and under the direction and in the interest of preserving the capitalist system of mastery—violence is chaotic; force is disciplinary. Sorel has this to say: "[A] distinction should be drawn between the force that aims at authority, endeavoring to bring about an automatic obedience, and the violence that would smash that authority." For Sorel, Marx never drew such a distinction because his economic project lacked the plethora of 20th-century proletarian revolts and their special strategies, so Marx's historical analysis was constrained to the investigation of the timely use of bourgeois force to meet the ends of capital (in what is generally referred to as primitive accumulation). In his words: "I do not think that Marx had ever examined any other form of social constraints except force."

In bringing his views full circle, Sorel states that the reformist disciples of Marx have deepened this area of ignorance where nothing but force is conceptualized as a historical force. In entrenching themselves in this error, they naively believe capitalism "could be destroyed by force [i.e., with the powers of the existing state], as it had been created by the intervention of force..." It becomes clear that there are great resemblances between Sorel's attitude of the state and that of Lenin in his The State and Revolution.

== Myth and the "Homeric hero" ==
An exhaustive definition of myths is not given by Sorel. On frequent occasions, he refers to them as "pictures," "images," or "expressions," but never a full description. The reason is given by Sorel on the account that myths "must be taken as a whole, as historical forces, and that we should be especially careful not to make any comparison between accomplished fact and the picture people had formed for themselves before action." Further, he opposes the "attempt to analyse such groups of images in the way that we analyse a thing in its elements..." The scientific approach does not accurately explain myths for Sorel, as they are "expressions of a determination to act" and therefore belong to man's irrational spontaneity. We may understand the function of such myths but they escape any universal description in the present: they are far too particular, relative, and dependent on the culture of the producers of these images; only case studies are possible in this instance, and the understanding of them as a historical force. In addition to this, Sorel adds another important word on his understanding of myths: "Men who are participating in a great social movement always picture their coming action as a battle in which their cause is certain to triumph. These constructions, knowledge of which is so important to historians, I propose to call myths." The character or "color" of this construction is dependent on the conditions of life that the producers of the myth experience.

There is also the concept of the "catastrophic myth" in Sorel's theory of myths, which is employed by groups in a struggle that purports the coming of catastrophe in a society, the subsequent fall of all things henceforth static in history. For reference, Sorel cites the Christians who, in early theology, believed in the imminent punishment of mankind by God in an apocalyptic episode; although this reckoning was never realized, it nonetheless functioned accordingly in bringing about more fervent Christians: "The catastrophe did not come to pass, but Christian thought profited so greatly from the apocalyptic myth that certain contemporary scholars maintain that the whole preaching of Christ referred solely to this point." It was by this metric of function, and that alone, that myths ought to be valued or not by Sorel; "The myth must be judged as a means of acting on the present; any attempt to discuss how far it can be taken literally is devoid of sense." The power of the myths come from their ability to negate any compromise. Clearly, there is a fate involved in these catastrophic myths, a fate which convinces the faithful that "all attempts made to bring about social peace seem childish..." The good myth is, therefore, the totalizing one for Sorel, which "drags into the revolutionary track everything it touches." Once again, Sorel believes it is the general strike that can bring about a similar sentiment for socialism.

Intimately linked to Sorel's theory of myth is that of heroism owing to how intimately myth deals with the concept of war and, so too, that of sacrifice. It is the idea of war conceived heroically, as Sorel names it, which he dwells on. For, in drawing an identical parallel with Nietzsche's theory of master morality, the heroic war has stitched in it "[t]he ardent desire to try ones strength in great battles... to conquer glory at the peril of one's life." Sorel desires that the proletariat rises to this occasion who, in the final contest of classes, "will give proof of the whole measure of its value." Compare this to Nietzsche's views, which Sorel was influenced thoroughly by, in how he sees the nobleman approach war: "[H]ere alone genuine 'love of one's enemies' is possible... How much reverence has a noble man for his enemies!.. For he desires his enemy for himself, as his mark of distinction... in whom there is nothing to despise and very much to honor!" Sorel goes further, in fact, and establishes that the "master type" spoken of by Nietzsche is still in existence in the United States, which for Sorel's time retained the culture of capitalist conquest and fervent exploitation of all by the individual, even comparing them to the "ancient Greek sailor" in their adventures. Nietzsche's disdain for popular democratic values, or the "herd instinct," which led him to regard the French Revolution as "the lowering" of mankind morally, is known to Sorel, who addresses what he believes to be Nietzsche's mistake: "If it has been believed that the type [of "Homeric Hero" was bound to disappear, that was because the Homeric values were imagined to be irreconcilable with the other values which sprang from this principle; Nietzsche committed this error, which all those who believe in the necessity of unity in thought are bound to make." Sorel makes his point that if proletarian violence is to emerge, it will draw from these Homeric archetypes which characterized Nietzsche's understanding of master morality, thus dispensing with the "morality of the weak" which would make any attempt at revolutionary socialism impossible.
