= A History of Political Theory =

1937 book by George Holland Sabine

- Author: George Holland Sabine
- Language: English, translated into Arabic, Greek, Indonesian, Italian, Japanese, Spanish, Korean and Chinese.
- Genre: Political theory
- Published: 1937
- Publisher: Dryden Press, fourth edition revised by Thomas Landon Thorson
- Publication date: fourth edition: 1973

A History of Political Theory is a book by George Holland Sabine on the history of political thought from Ancient Greece to fascism and Nazism in the 1930s. First published in 1937, it propounds a hypothesis that theories of politics are themselves a part of politics. That is, they do not refer to an external reality but are produced as a normal part of the social milieu in which politics itself has its being.

The book has been translated into Arabic, Greek, Indonesian, Italian, Japanese, Spanish and Chinese.

In 1973, Dryden Press issued a fourth edition, revised by Thomas Landon Thorson.

== Contents ==
Part I : The Theory of the City-State
1. The City-State
2. Political Thought Before Plato
3. Plato, The Republic
4. Plato, The Statesman and The Laws
5. Aristotle, Political Ideals
6. Aristotle, Political Actualities
7. The Twilight of the City-State

Part II : The Theory of the Universal Community
8. The Law of the Nature
9. Cicero and the Roman Lawyers
10. Seneca and the Fathers of the Church
11. The Folk and its Laws
12. The Investiture Controversy
13. Universitas Hominum
14. Philip the Fair and Boniface VIII
15. Marsilio of Padua and William of Occam
16. The Conciliar Theory of Church Government

Part III : The Theory of the Nation State
17. Machiavelli
18. The Early Protestant Reformers
19. Royalist and Anti-Royalist Theories
20. Jean Bodin
21. The Modernized Theory of Natural Law
22. England : Preparation for Civil War
23. Thomas Hobbes
24. Radicals and Communists
25. The Republicans : Harrington, Milton, and Sidney
26. Halifax and Locke
27. France : The Decadence of Natural Law
28. The Rediscovery of the Community : Rousseau
29. Convention and Tradition : Hume and Burke
30. Hegel : Dialectic and Nationalism
31. Liberalism : Philosophical Radicalism
32. Liberalism Modernized
33. Marx and Dialectical Materialism
34. Communism
35. Fascism and National Socialism

== Reviews ==
The book received several favorable reviews soon after publication. Floyd House noted "adequate scholarship, his interpretations are highly intelligent, and he has covered the ground with surprising comprehensiveness."

James Leahigh wrote that it was "as objective and unbiased a study of the many characters presented throughout his work as any hitherto attempted compendious history of political theory."

Leland Jenks chose to review it with ten other works on political theory and noted, "Half of Sabine's material is devoted to men before Bodin, and his treatment of the nineteenth century while brilliant is relatively brief." Jenks considers the natural audience for it to be "best for students who are to apprehend the importance of political speculation in the history of social thought." Jenks admired Sabine's composition: "Sabine is most successful in integrating theories of successive writers as coherent wholes, and in discerning logical discrepancies. He provides an original and searching critique, from the explicit standpoint of Humean empiricism." The role of value systems in politics is acknowledged: "Sabine is especially effective in showing the relativity of social thought to general value systems in different societies."

When the book was revised in 1950, Journal of Philosophy reviewer C. F. noted the new edition "more strongly emphasizes the wide separation between the moral temper of democracy and that of communism."

== Thorson edition ==
Thomas Landon Thorson, author of Logic of Democracy (1962) and Biopolitics (1970), revised A History of Political Theory in 1973 for a fourth edition. He explains the revisions in a preface:

A new first chapter has been added which attempts to put the history of political theory into context both of the evolution of man and of pre-Greek, pre-philosophic thought.... A variety of judgements scattered throughout the discussion have been softened, generally by omitting words or sentences, most notably in the chapter on Hegel where several pages have been omitted.

The new first chapter refers to cultural evolution:

To borrow a way of talking from biology, we can say that just as nature at a certain time and place evolved mammals, so did the culture-bearing animal evolve and come to carry with him disciplined, self-conscious political inquiry.

To maintain such an anthropological scope, Thorson sketches the dominant cultures before the arrival of democracy in Greece. He concedes a Middle Eastern dominance.

Beginning around 1700 B.C., a wave of invasions from the north opened up a new phase in development of mankind.

Thorson then quotes William Hardy McNeill:

...a cluster of petty Greek city-states had begun to create a civilization which while drawing upon the Orient for many of its elements, was nevertheless profoundly different in quality. This civilization became a lodestar...

Thorson describes the global situation then:

The era of Middle Eastern dominance thereby came to an end; and a complicated cultural interplay began among the major civilized communities of Europe, the Middle East, India and China.

== See also ==
- Consent of the governed
