= The Illusions of Progress =

1908 book by Georges Sorel

- Author: Georges Sorel
- Original title: Les Illusions du progrès
- Translator: John Stanley; Charlotte Stanley
- Language: French
- Subject: progress
- Publisher: Marcel Rivière
- Publication date: 1908
- Publication place: France
- English publication date: 1969

The Illusions of Progress (French: Les Illusions du progrès) is a 1908 book by the French writer Georges Sorel.

== Summary ==
Sorel traces the idea of progress from its origin in the Age of Enlightenment and its subsequent developments and uses. The book is critical of the bourgeoisie and explores Sorel's thesis that belief in progress originated as a way for a degenerated social class to justify and prolong its dominance. Progress is thus not something universal and inevitable, but a tool that gives legitimacy to particular social elites. Belief in progress, according to Sorel, stifles opposition by replacing virtues that call for action with a passive and deterministic view of history, thereby proclaiming the political trajectory the rulers prefer as the only one possible. Sorel argues that progress and its associated ideologies are best undermined by revolutionary myths, which can be rooted in human creativity, adaptability and the virtues associated with great historical periods.
