= George Holland Sabine =

American political scientist (1880–1961)

- Born: December 9, 1880; Dayton, Ohio, US
- Died: January 18, 1961 (aged 80); Washington, D.C., Washington, USA
- Citizenship: USA
- Education: Cornell University
- Occupation: professor of philosophy
- Known for: A History of Political Theory

George Holland Sabine (9 December 1880 – 18 January 1961), popularly known as Sabine, was an American professor of philosophy, dean of the graduate school and vice president of Cornell University. He is best known for his authoritative work A History of Political Theory, which traces the growth of political thought from the times of Plato to modern fascism and nazism. George Sabine was also a carpenter, a blacksmith, a cook, and a gardener and collected lithographs and etchings.

== Biography ==
He was born in Dayton, Ohio to Lorenzo D. Sabine and Eva Josephine Tucker.

Sabine entered Cornell University in 1899, received his A.B. in 1903 and Ph.D. in 1906. He taught at Stanford University from 1907 to 1914. That year, he was appointed professor of philosophy at University of Missouri. He continued teaching there until 1923 when he began at Ohio State University. In 1931, he returned to Cornell, where Henry W. Sage had endowed the Susan Linn Sage professorship. Beyond the classroom, Sabine served as Dean of Graduate School from 1940 to 1944, and as Vice President of Cornell from 1943 to 1946. He was affiliated with the Cornell Branch of the Telluride Association, where he resided in his final years.

He died in Washington, D.C.

== Research ==
In his review of A History of Political Theory, Leland Jenks noted, "Sabine is the only textbook writer who is abreast of recent Rousseau scholarship, as represented by Hoffding, Lanson, Cassirer, and Hendel."

== Works ==
- A History of Political Theory - first published on April 10, 1937
- "What is Political Theory?", The Journal of Politics, Feb. 1939
- "The Pragmatic Approach to Political Science", American Political Science Review, Nov. 1930
- "Political Science and the Juristic Point of View", American Political Science Review, Aug. 1928
- "Henry Adams and the Writing of History", University of California Chronicle, Jan. 1924
- "Bosanquet's Theory of the Real Will", The Philosophical Review, Nov. 1923
- Introduction and translation of Hugo Krabbe's The Modern Idea of the State (New York: D. Appleton), 1922
- "The Concept of the State as Power", Philosophical Review, July 1920
- "Philosophical and Scientific Specialization", Philosophical Review, Jan. 1917
- "Professor Bosanquet's Logic and the Concrete Universal", Philosophical Review, Sept. 1912
- "Descriptive and Normative Sciences", Philosophical Review, July 1912
- "The Material of Thought", Philosophical Review, May 1907
- "The Concreteness of Thought", Philosophical Review, Mar. 1907
- "Hume's Contribution to the Historical Method", Philosophical Review, Jan. 1906
- "Radical Empiricism as a Logical Method", The Philosophical Review, Nov. 1905
