= Panthéon-Sorbonne University School of Law =

French law school

École de droit de la Sorbonne
- Motto: Omnibus sapientia, unicuique excellentia (Latin for 'Knowledge for all, excellence for each')
- Parent school: Panthéon-Sorbonne University
- Established: 1150; 876 years ago (University of Paris Law Faculty); 1970; 56 years ago (EDS)
- School type: Public law school
- Dean: Agnès Roblot-Troizier
- Location: Paris, Île-de-France, France
- Enrollment: 3,730 (2024)
- Faculty: 135
- USNWR ranking: 1st in France, 17th in the world (2024)
- Bar pass rate: 37.9% (2021)
- Website: droit.pantheonsorbonne.fr

Sorbonne Law School, officially the Panthéon-Sorbonne University School of Law, is the law school of the Panthéon-Sorbonne University (Paris-I). It is one of the two successors to the University of Paris Faculty of Law, along with the Assas Law School and is located in the Panthéon Centre, in the 5th arrondissement of Paris, on the Place du Panthéon.

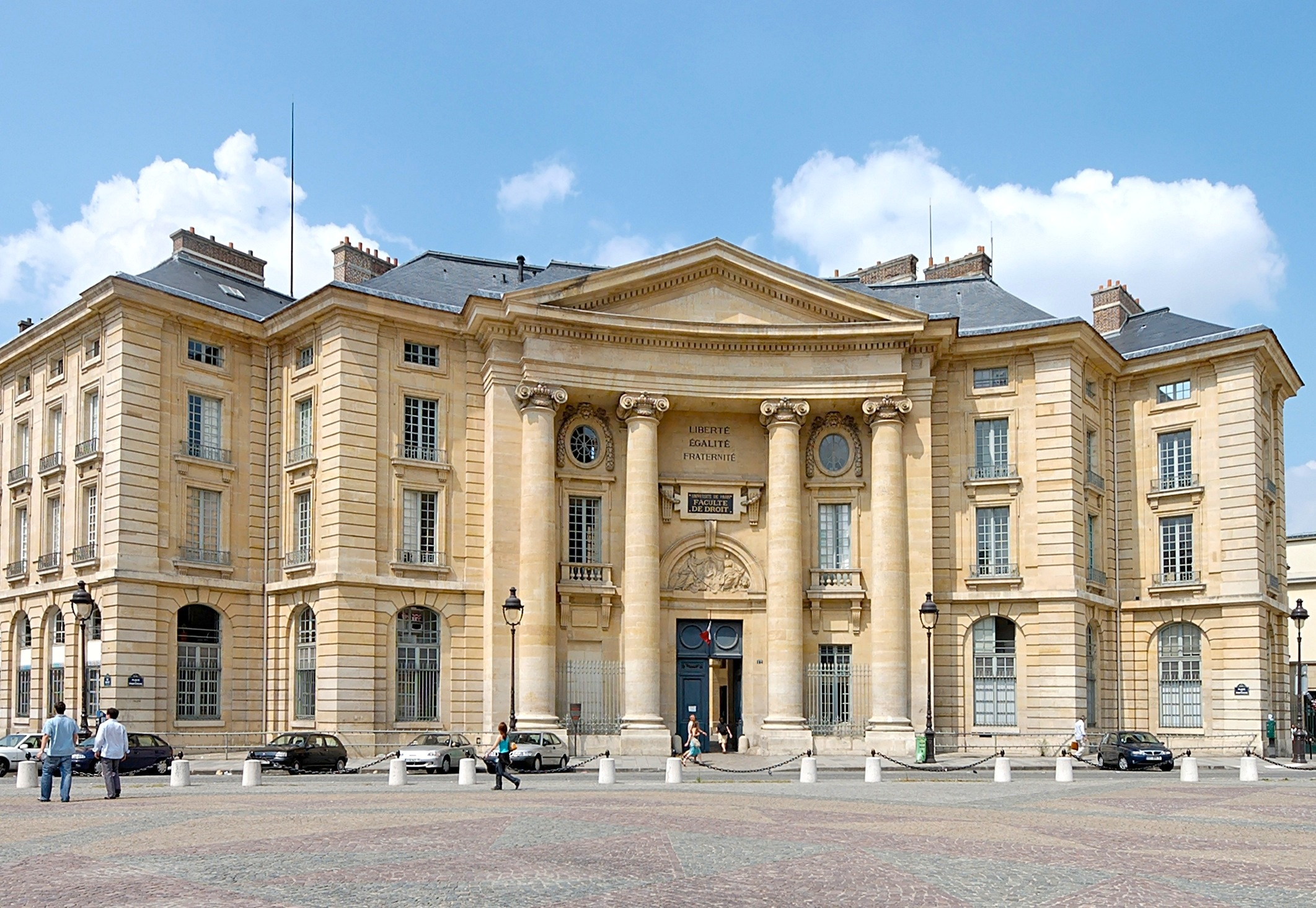
The Panthéon Centre in Paris.

Its motto, in Latin, is: "Omnibus sapientia, unicuique excellentia" ("knowledge for all, excellence for each").

It is the best law faculty in France, 6th in Europe and 17th in the world according to the QS Top universities ranking, ahead of the UCLA School of Law or the Ivy League Cornell Law School. It is also ranked as the 1st non-English speaking law faculty worldwide by the same ranking.

== History ==
In 1970, the Edgar Faure Act divided the law faculty of the University of Paris into the new universities of Paris-I, Paris-II, Paris-IX, Paris-X, Paris-XII and Paris-XIII.

While the majority of economists in the law faculty (35 out of 41) chose Paris-I Panthéon-Sorbonne, the majority of lawyers (88 out of 108), including privatists, legal historians and a significant number of publicists, had decided to create a specialised university: Paris II Panthéon-Assas. Conversely, their colleagues opted for a multidisciplinary university by joining Paris I.

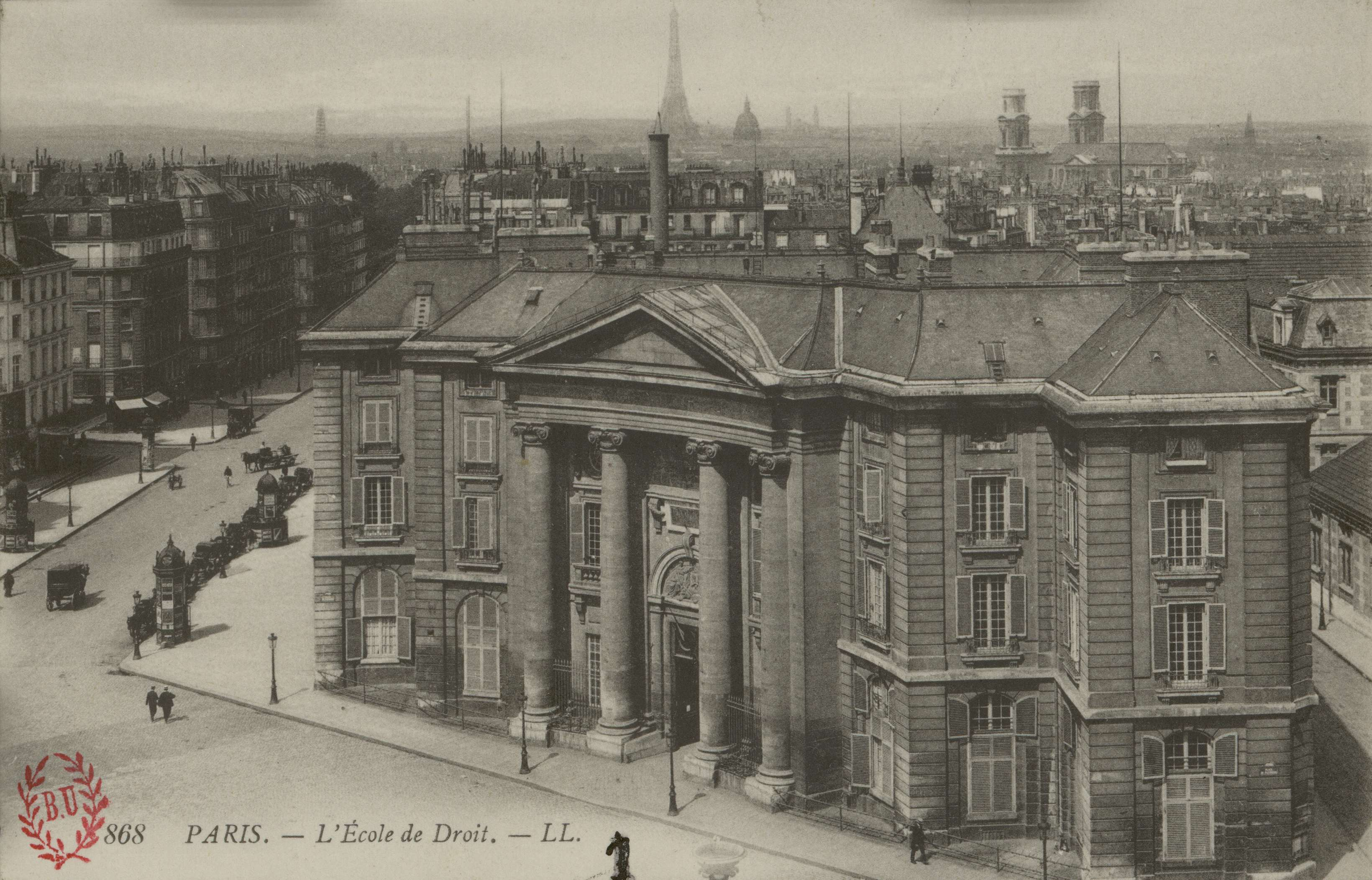
L'École de droit de Paris (Sorbonne Library).

There is therefore a historical rivalry between the Sorbonne Law School (part of the Paris 1 Panthéon-Sorbonne University) and the Assas Law School (part of the Paris-Panthéon-Assas University). This is made further relevant today due to disparity in political opinion between the two universities. Assas is regarded as the bastion of the far-right within Parisian academic institutions, with far-right extremist organisations such as the Groupe Union Défense and other protests being based there. Additionally, Assas counts members of the Le Pen family which has led the far-right National Rally party in its alumni (Jean-Marie le Pen, Marine Le Pen, Marion Maréchal). Conversely, the Sorbonne Law School (and Paris I) retains a more left-wing reputation, with students commenting in favour of left-wing candidates in the press.

== Departments ==
The École de droit de la Sorbonne has four departments, all of which aim to train students in the law:

- the Bachelor's Department
- Master of Public Law Department
- Master of Private Law Department
- Master of International, European and Comparative Law Department

== Campuses ==
EDS courses are taught at a number of campuses, known as 'centres':

- the Panthéon centre, a historic building that welcomes Masters students and houses the management offices
- the Sorbonne centre, which hosts conferences for EDS students and 3rd year AES undergraduates
- the Lourcine centre, for 2nd and 3rd year undergraduate students in particular
- the Cassin centre, for 1st and 2nd year undergraduate students
- the Pierre-Mendès-France centre, for 1st and 2nd year AES degree students

== Research ==
Research is carried out by the Sorbonne's École doctorale de droit, the Sorbonne's Institut de recherche juridique, the Sorbonne's Institut de recherche en droit international et européen and the Sorbonne's Institut des sciences juridiques et philosophique.

- François Luchaire: drafter of the Constitution of 4 October 1958, former member of the Constitutional Council and member of the French Resistance.
- Robert Badinter: Professor of law (1974–1994), then appointed professor emeritus. Senator (1995–2011), President of the Constitutional Council (1986–1995) and Minister of Justice (1981–1986), writer.
- Mireille Delmas-Marty: Professor of criminal law, currently professor at the Collège de France.
- Jean-Claude Colliard: former member of the Constitutional Council.
- Dominique Rousseau: Professor of constitutional law and former member of the Conseil supérieur de la magistrature between 2002 and 2006.
- Bertrand Mathieu: Professor of public law, Conseiller d'État in extraordinary service, former member of the "Balladur" committee.
- Jean Gicquel: Professor of public law (constitutional law), former member of the Conseil supérieur de la magistrature.
- Marie-Anne Cohendet: Professor of public law, teaches constitutional law and environmental law.
- Anne Levade: Professor of public law, former member of the Balladur committee, member of the HATVP college.
- Jeannette Bougrab: Senior lecturer in public law, former French Secretary of State for Youth.
