= Panthéon Centre =

- Centre Panthéon, Latin Quarter
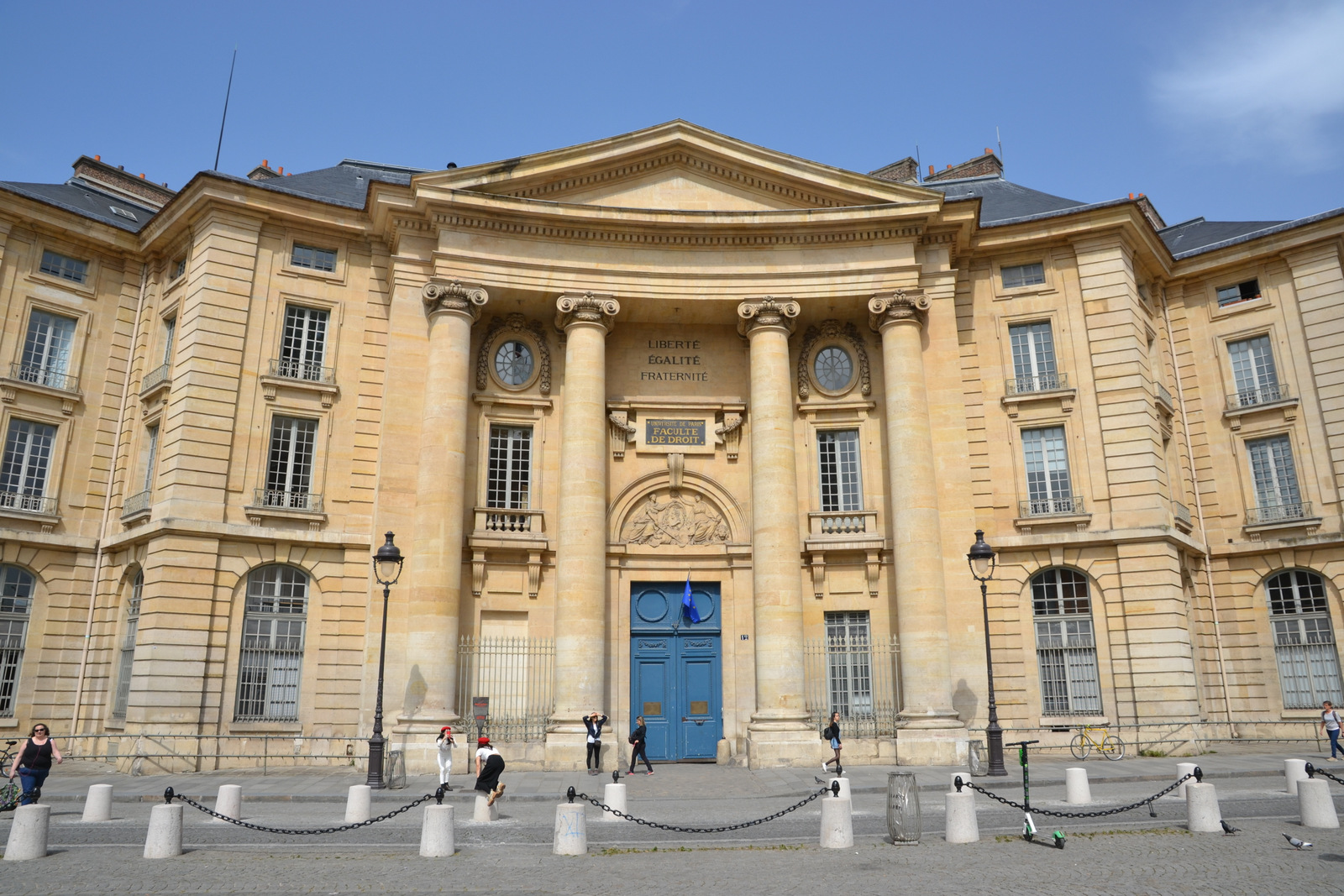
- The facade of the Panthéon Centre.

- Location within Paris
- Alternative names: École de Droit de Paris, Faculté de Droit de Paris

General information
- Type: Academic
- Location: 12, place du Panthéon, Latin Quarter, Paris
- Coordinates: 48.8470123°N 2.3414409°E
- Current tenants: Paris 1 Panthéon-Sorbonne University and Paris-Panthéon-Assas University
- Construction started: 1771
- Completed: 1773
- Owner: Chancellerie des Universités de Paris

Design and construction
- Architect: Jacques-Germain Soufflot

The Panthéon Centre (French: Centre Panthéon), also known as the École de droit de Paris, is an academic building in the Latin Quarter urban university campus, in the 5th arrondissement of Paris, located at 12, place du Panthéon. It currently houses the presidencies and head offices of the Panthéon-Sorbonne and Panthéon-Assas universities, as well as:

- the Panthéon-Sorbonne University School of Law,
- and the Assas Law School and College.

It was designed by architect Jacques-Germain Soufflot between 1771 and 1773. Since January 6, 1926, it has been listed as a Monument historique.

== History ==
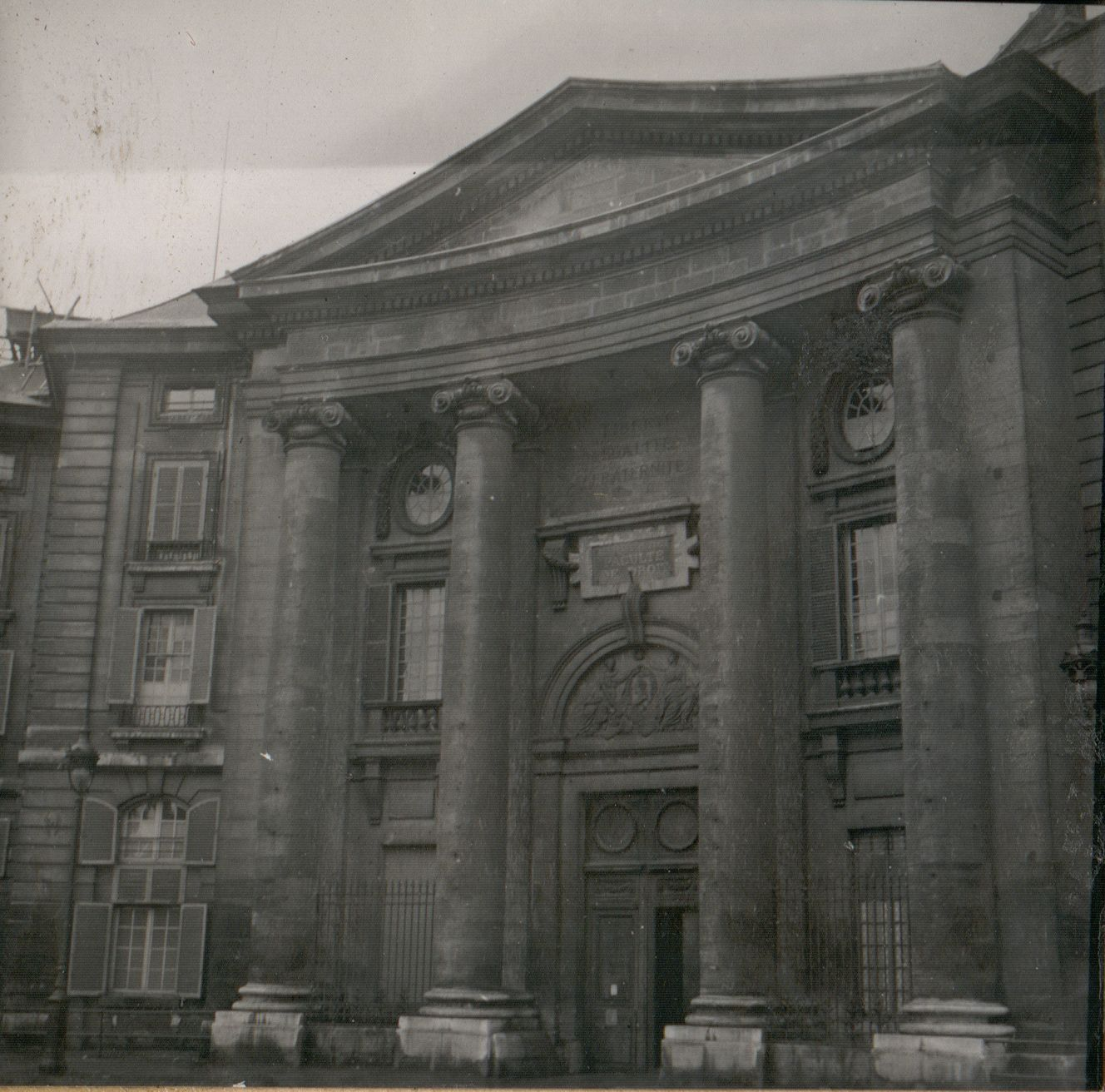
L'Entrée de la faculté de droit de Paris, in 1940, Sorbonne Library

On November 16, 1753, King Louis XV ordered the construction of a building on the summit of Montagne Sainte-Geneviève to house law students and their professors. During the reorganization of the university following the expulsion of the Jesuits from the Lisieux College in 1762, Daniel-Charles Trudaine, administrator of bridges and roads and honorary doctor of the Faculty of Civil and Canon Law, granted the construction of a new building for the faculty on the site of the Lisieux College. Jacques-Germain Soufflot, the great French architect and controller of the King's buildings, was appointed to construct the building, which lasted from 1771 to 1773. Initially located on rue Saint-Jean-de-Beauvais, within the Collège Royal, the building opened in 1774 and was officially inaugurated in 1783.

The Faculty of Law was abolished in 1793, as were all the faculties of the former University of Paris after the French Revolution.

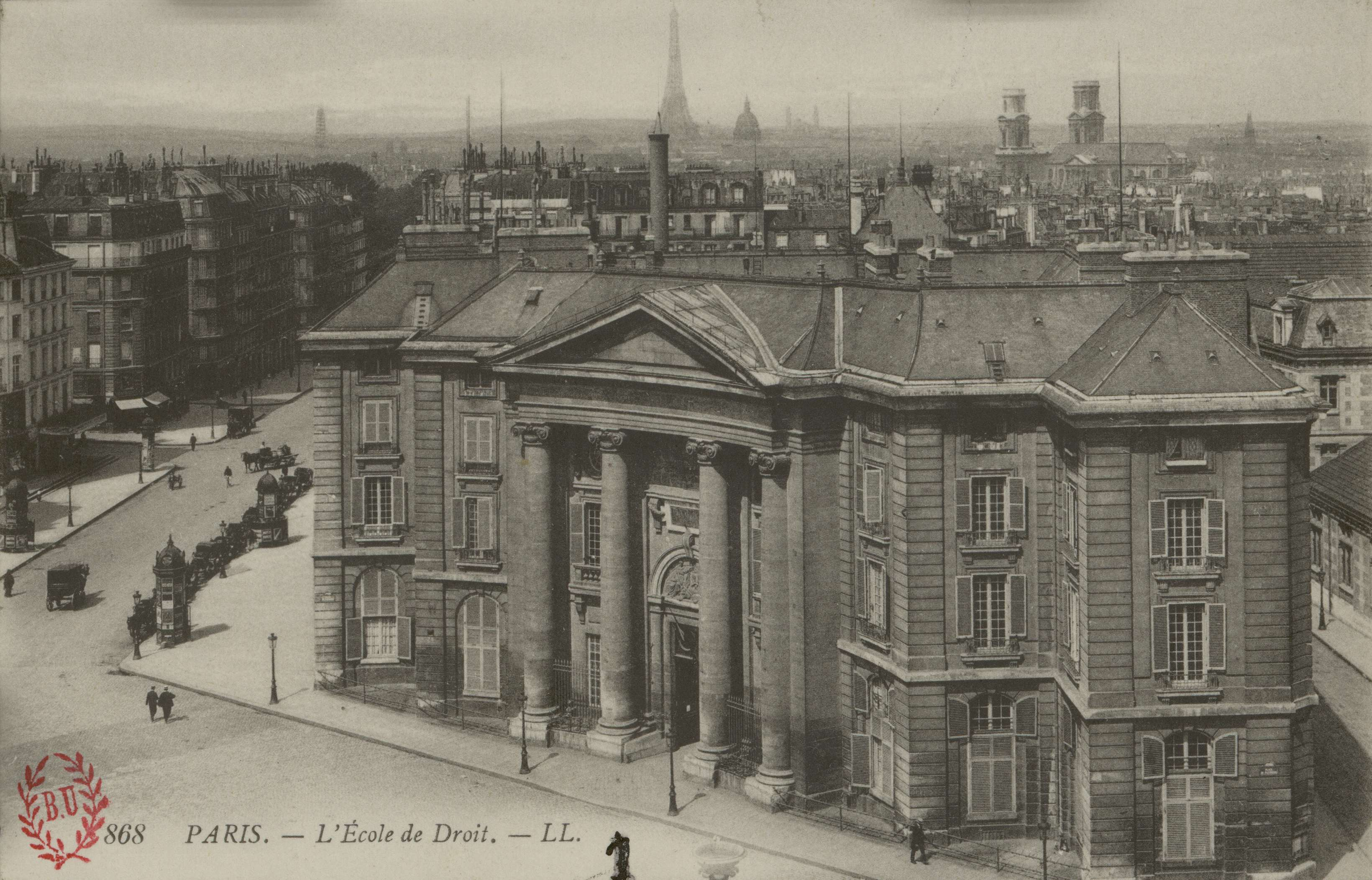
L'École de droit de Paris, Sorbonne Library

A École de droit de Paris ("Paris Law School") reopened on November 22, 1805, following the promulgation of the Napoleonic Code, which created modern law schools.

Since the Edgar Faure law and the split of the University of Paris in 1970, the Panthéon Centre has been shared between the universities Paris 1 Panthéon-Sorbonne and Panthéon-Assas, with the École de Droit de la Sorbonne attached to Panthéon-Sorbonne and the Collège et École de Droit of Panthéon-Assas.

== See also ==
- École de Droit de la Sorbonne
- Assas Law School and College
- Paris-Panthéon-Assas University
- Faculty of Law of Paris
