= Paris 1 Panthéon-Sorbonne University =

French university located at the heart of the Latin Quarter, in Paris

Panthéon-Sorbonne University
- Université Paris 1 Panthéon-Sorbonne
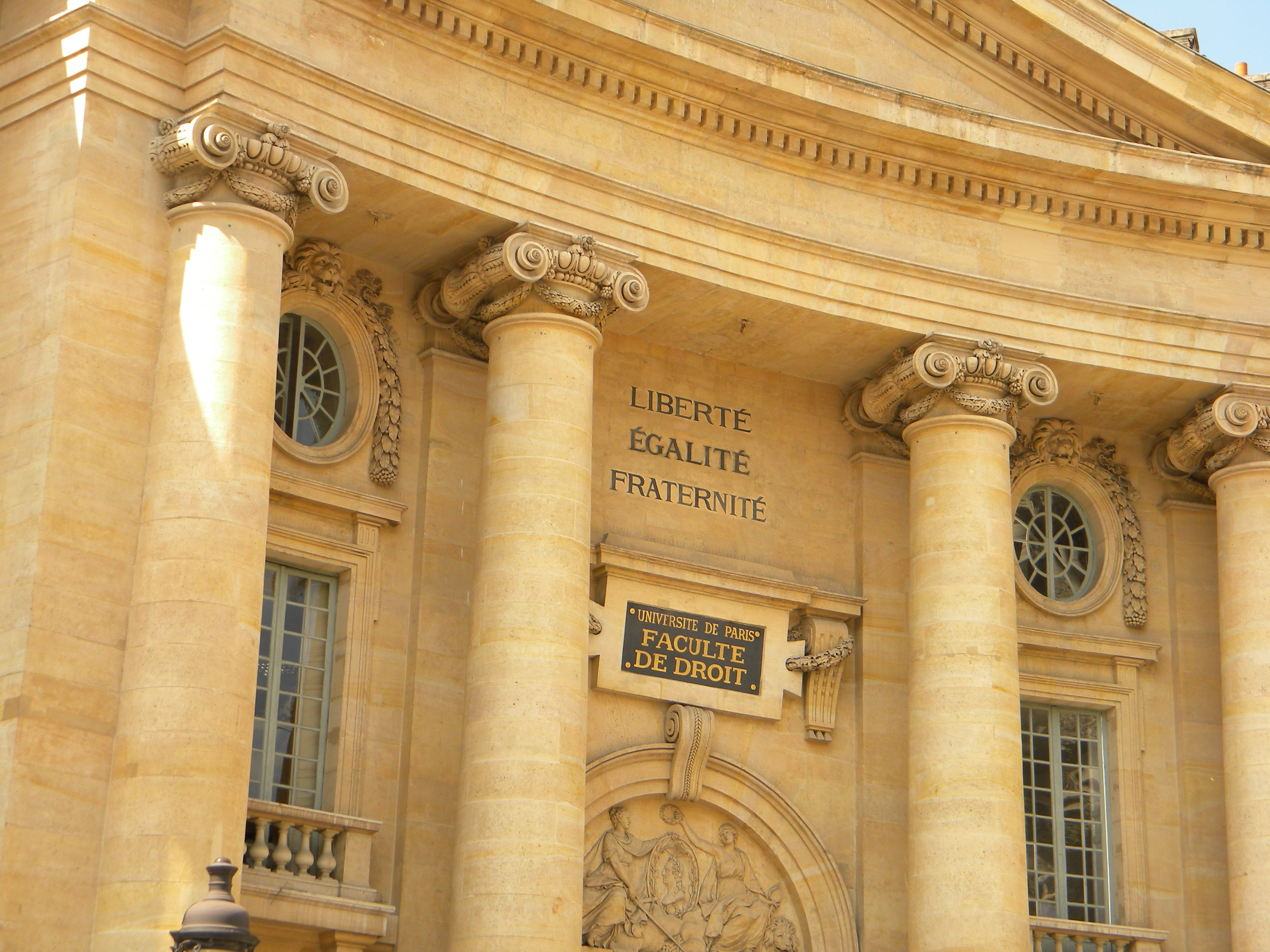
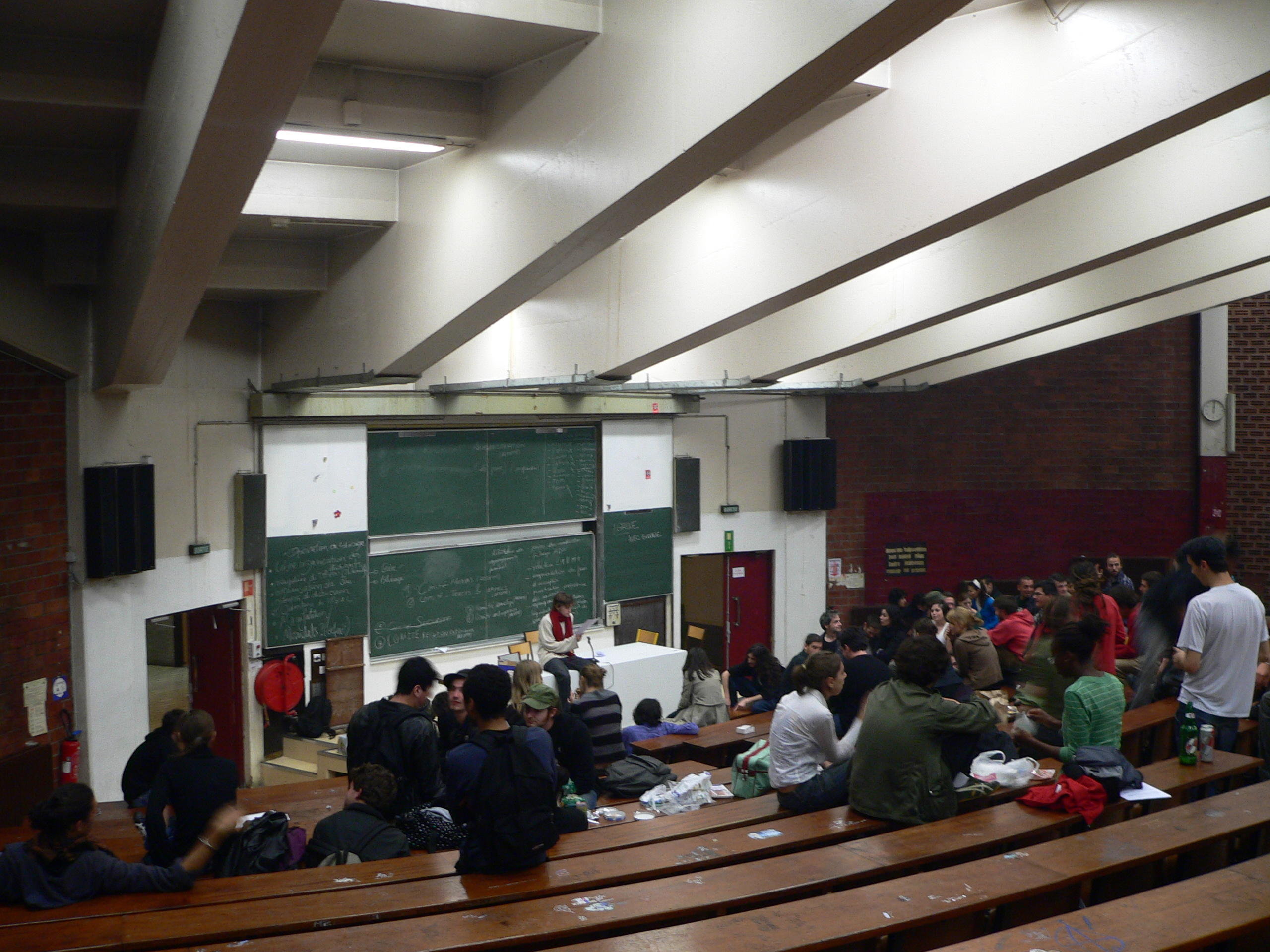
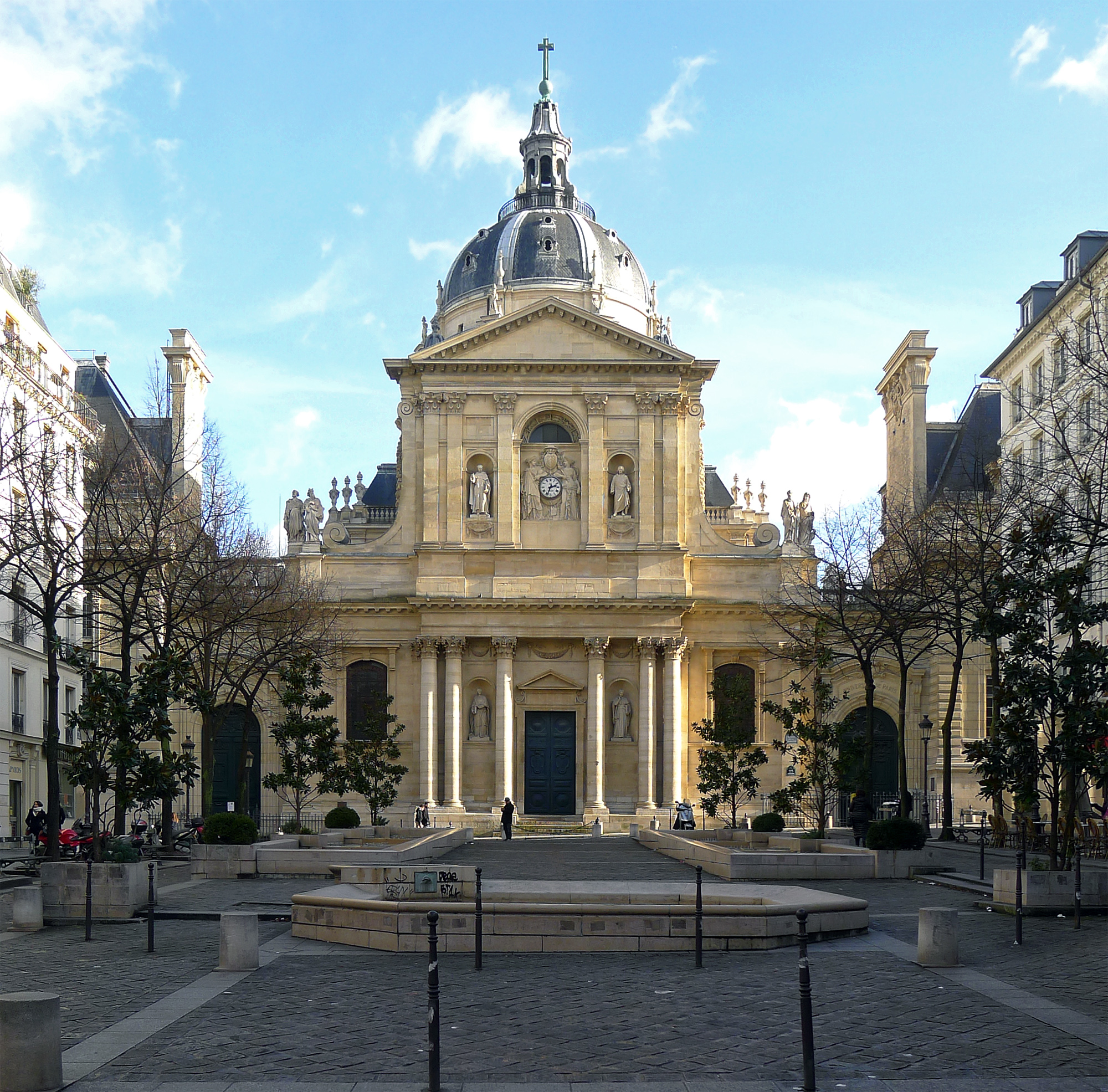
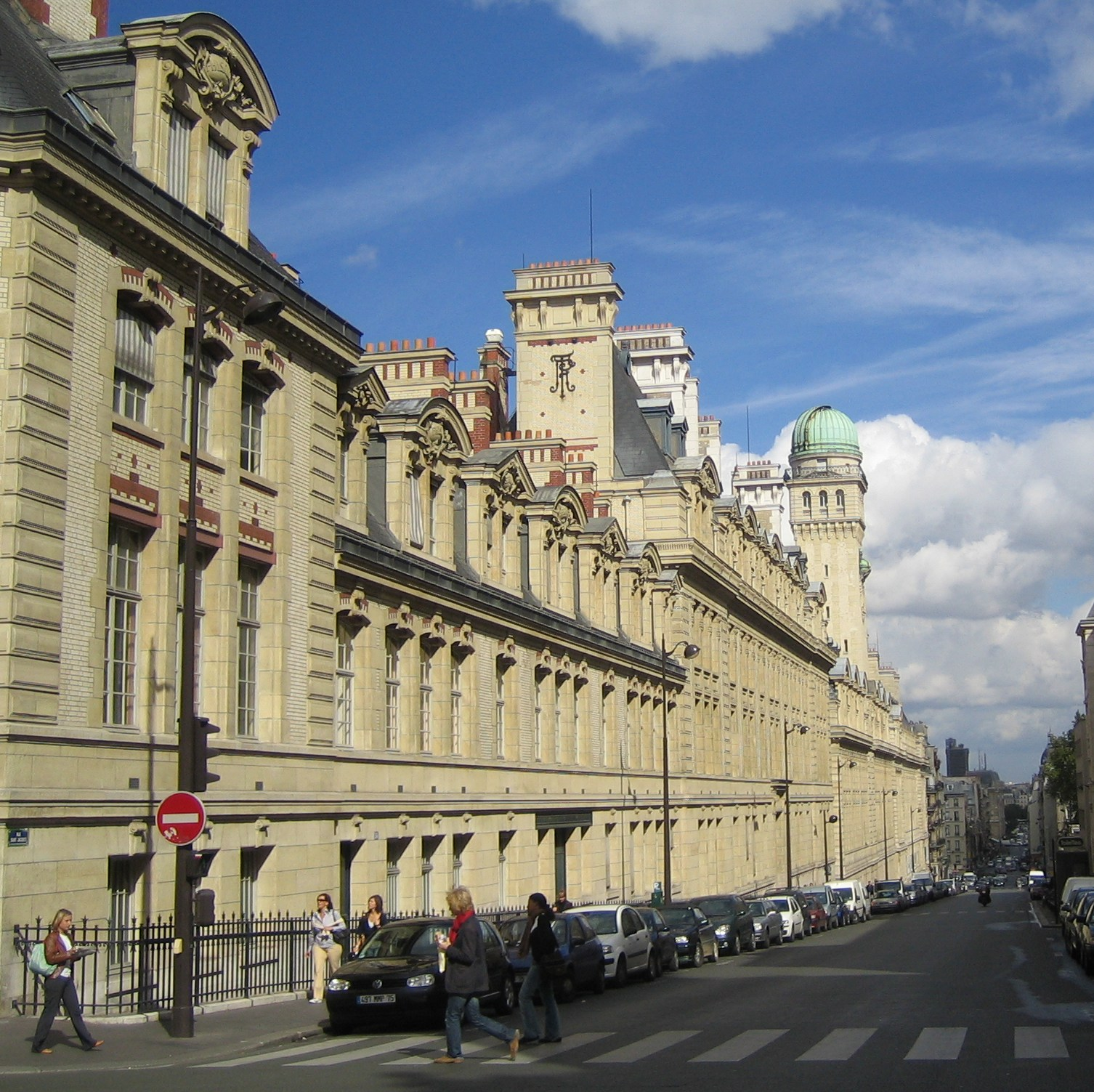
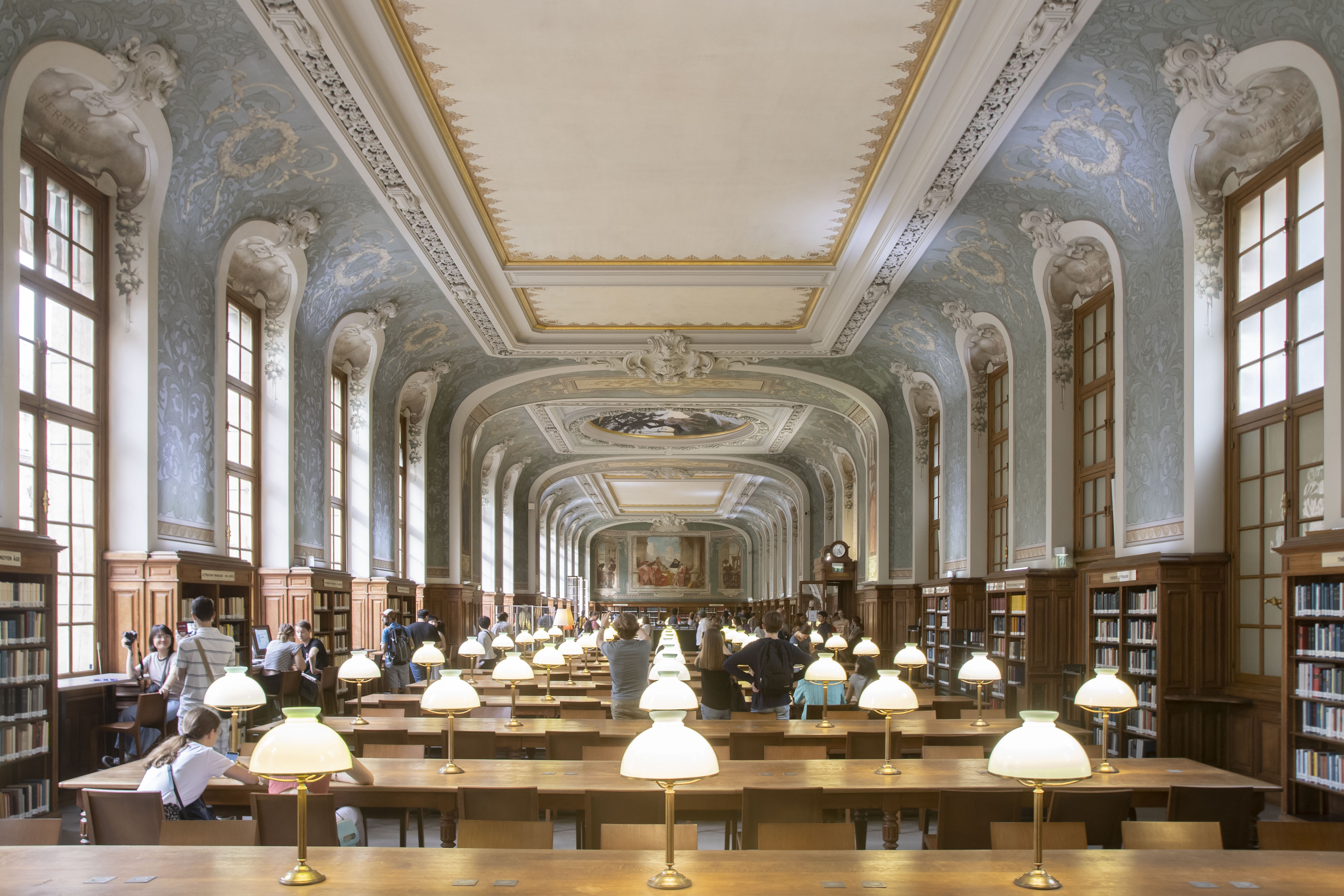
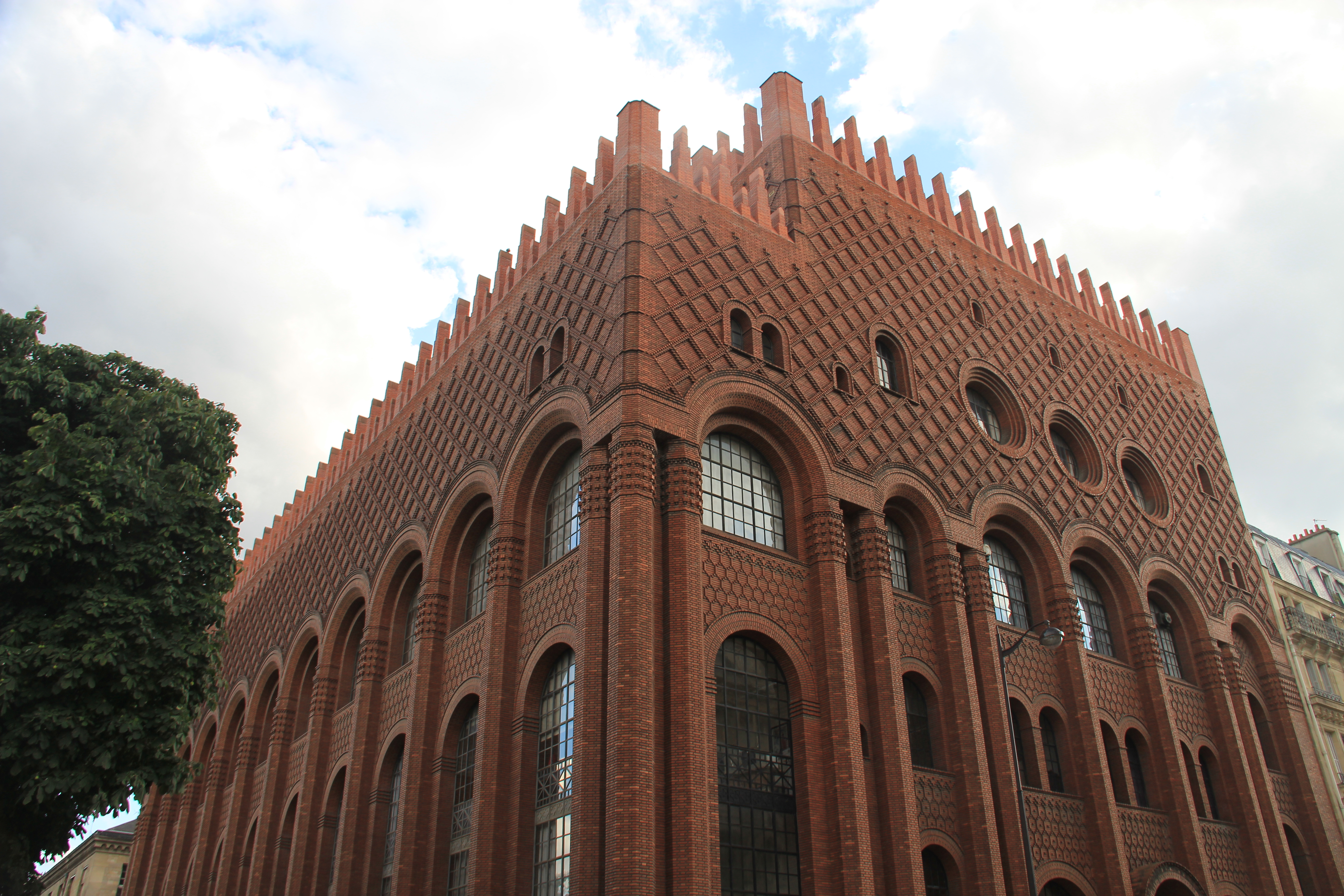
- Other name: Paris 1
- Motto: Omnibus Sapientia, Unicuique Excellentia
- Type: Public
- Established: 1971, following the division of the University of Paris (founded c. 1150)
- Affiliations: Chancellery of the Universities of Paris; Europaeum; Una Europa
- Budget: €222 million (2021)
- Chancellor: Bernard Beignier (Chancellor of the universities of Paris)
- President: Christine Neau-Leduc
- Administrative staff: 2,770
- Students: 45,200
- Location: Paris, France; 48°50′55″N 2°20′36″E
- Colours: Blue, white, gold
- Website: https://www.pantheonsorbonne.fr/
- Location in Paris

Paris 1 Panthéon-Sorbonne University (French: Université Paris 1 Panthéon-Sorbonne), also known as Paris 1 or Panthéon-Sorbonne University is a public research university in Paris, France. It was created in 1971 from two faculties of the historic University of Paris after the May 1968 protests, which resulted in the division of the university. Most of the professors of the faculty of law decided to found the Paris 1 University, along with professors of the faculty of humanities and faculty of economics.

Panthéon-Sorbonne has three main areas of specialization: Economics and Management, Human Sciences, and Legal and Political Sciences. It comprises several subjects such as: Economics, Law, Philosophy, Sociology, History, Geography, Cinema, Plastic arts, Art history, Political science, Development Studies, Mathematics and Management.

Panthéon-Sorbonne's headquarters is located on the Place du Panthéon in the Latin Quarter, an area in the 5th and the 6th arrondissements of Paris. The university also occupies part of the historical Sorbonne campus. The current name of the university refers to these two symbolic buildings: the Sorbonne and the Panthéon (Saint-Jacques part). Overall, its campus includes over 25 buildings in Paris, such as the Centre Pierre Mendès France ("Tolbiac"), the Maison des Sciences Économiques, among others.

== History ==
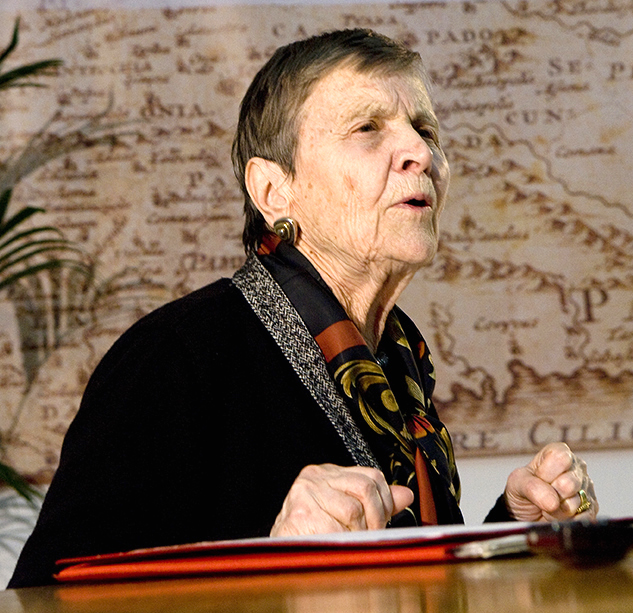
Hélène Ahrweiler, one of the cofounders of Paris 1

The historic University of Paris (French: Université de Paris) first appeared in the second half of the 12th century, but was reorganised in 1970 as 13 autonomous universities after the student protests of the French May.

=== The split of the University of Paris ===
In 1945, at the end of the World War II, the University of Paris was faced with its own problems, which had been exacerbated by the war and foreign occupation. Students were crammed into overcrowded classrooms and lecture theatres, and the teaching staff, who were too few in number, did not have the resources to monitor and supervise them properly.

The decentralisation of university campuses and centres in and around the capital was mainly the work of the Fifth French Republic in the early years of its existence. This policy achieved its objectives, in particular by responding to the problems posed by student numbers. The government also believed it could control student access to university, by organising a strict selection process at the entrance to faculties and creating university technical institutes (IUT) in the Paris suburbs. As this reform had not been negotiated with all the interested parties, it was rejected by students in an unfavourable political and social climate, and provoked a veritable insurrection in faculties in Paris and the other regions.

During the French May and following months of conflict between students and authorities at the University of Paris at Nanterre, the administration shut down that university on 2 May 1968. Students of the University of Paris protested the closure and the threatened expulsion of several students at Nanterre on 3 May 1968.

In Paris, where the university had become very difficult to manage due to the sheer number of professors and students, the law of 12 November 1968 led to the creation in 1969 of thirteen universities to succeed the University of Paris (nicknamed "the Sorbonne"), which ceased to exist.

At the instigation of professors François Luchaire (public law), Henri Bartoli (economics), and Hélène Ahrweiler (humanities), the three official co-founders of the university, the Paris 1 "Panthéon-Sorbonne" University was created in 1971 from the merger of part of the Faculty of Law and Economics (Panthéon) and part of the Faculty of Arts and Humanities (Sorbonne).

While Paris-Sorbonne University (now Sorbonne University) and Sorbonne Nouvelle succeeded the Faculty of Arts and Humanities of the University of Paris, Panthéon-Assas University the Faculty of Law, and Pierre and Marie Curie University (now Sorbonne University) and Paris Descartes University (now Paris Cité University) the Faculty of Sciences, Panthéon-Sorbonne University was founded as an interdisciplinary university.

The majority of the law professors from the faculty of law and economics at the University of Paris desired to restructure their faculty into a university. However, most of the faculty's economists and political scientists, whose disciplines were secondary in the Faculty of Law of Paris, wanted to join a multidisciplinary university they hurried ahead of their colleagues and established Paris I and were joined by professors of the faculty of humanities and a few professors of the faculty of law and economics.

The name of the university shows this interdisciplinarity: the Sorbonne building is the traditional seat of the Humanities studies in Paris (hence it is also used by Sorbonne Nouvelle and Sorbonne University), and the Panthéon Centre is, with the Assas Centre, the traditional seat of the law studies (hence it is also used by Panthéon-Assas University).

== Campuses ==
Paris 1 main campuses (red) and undergraduate campuses (blue) within Paris

Student distribution across the university's campuses
First two years locations (L1, L2)	3rd years and graduates locations (L3, M1, M2, PhD)
Port-Royal Centre (13th arrondissement of Paris) It houses courses for 1st and 2nd year students of: the Sorbonne Law School	Panthéon Centre, Latin Quarter campus (5th arrondissement of Paris) Centre shared with Panthéon-Assas University. It houses the University Head Office, the Presidency, the Sorbonne Artgallery and third-year undergraduate (L3) and master's-level courses of: the Sorbonne Law School (and the Sorbonne's Economic, Social Administration Institute and Paris Insurance Institute)
Pierre Mendès-France Centre, commonly known as "Tolbiac" (13th arrondissement of Paris) This centre is home to the majority of first (L1) and second-year undergraduates (L2). It is the obligatory step for many students before accessing third-year (L3) and masters courses. 1st and 2nd year students of: the Sorbonne School of Management; the Sorbonne School of History; the Sorbonne School of Economics; the Sorbonne Department of Philosophy; the Sorbonne Department of Sociology; the Sorbonne Department of Geography; the Sorbonne School of Political Science; the Sorbonne School of Art History and Archaeology; the Sorbonne Mathematics and Computer Science Department	Sorbonne Centre, Latin Quarter campus (5th arrondissement of Paris) Campus shared with Sorbonne University and the Chancellery. It houses the Sorbonne Library and courses. Reserved for third-year undergraduates (L3), masters and doctoral students (PhD) of: the Sorbonne School of Management; the Sorbonne School of History; the Sorbonne Department of Philosophy; the Sorbonne School of Political Science
Institute of Geography Building, Latin Quarter campus (5th arrondissement of Paris) Reserved for third-year undergraduates (L3), masters students of: the Sorbonne Department of Geography
Michelet Centre (6th arrondissement of Paris) Centre shared with Sorbonne University It houses the Michelet Library. Reserved for third-year undergraduates (L3), masters students of: the Sorbonne School of Art History and Archaeology
Sorbonne Economic Sciences House (13th arrondissement of Paris) It houses master's-level courses of: the Sorbonne School of Economics; the Sorbonne Mathematics and Computer Science Department
Saint-Charles Centre (15th arrondissement of Paris) It houses all undergraduates (L1 to L3), masters and doctoral students courses of: the Sorbonne School of Arts
Broca Centre (5th arrondissement of Paris) It houses all undergraduates (L1 to L3), masters and doctoral students courses of: Sorbonne Institute of Judicial Studies; Sorbonne Institute for Research and Higher Studies in Tourism (IREST)

=== Latin Quarter campus ===
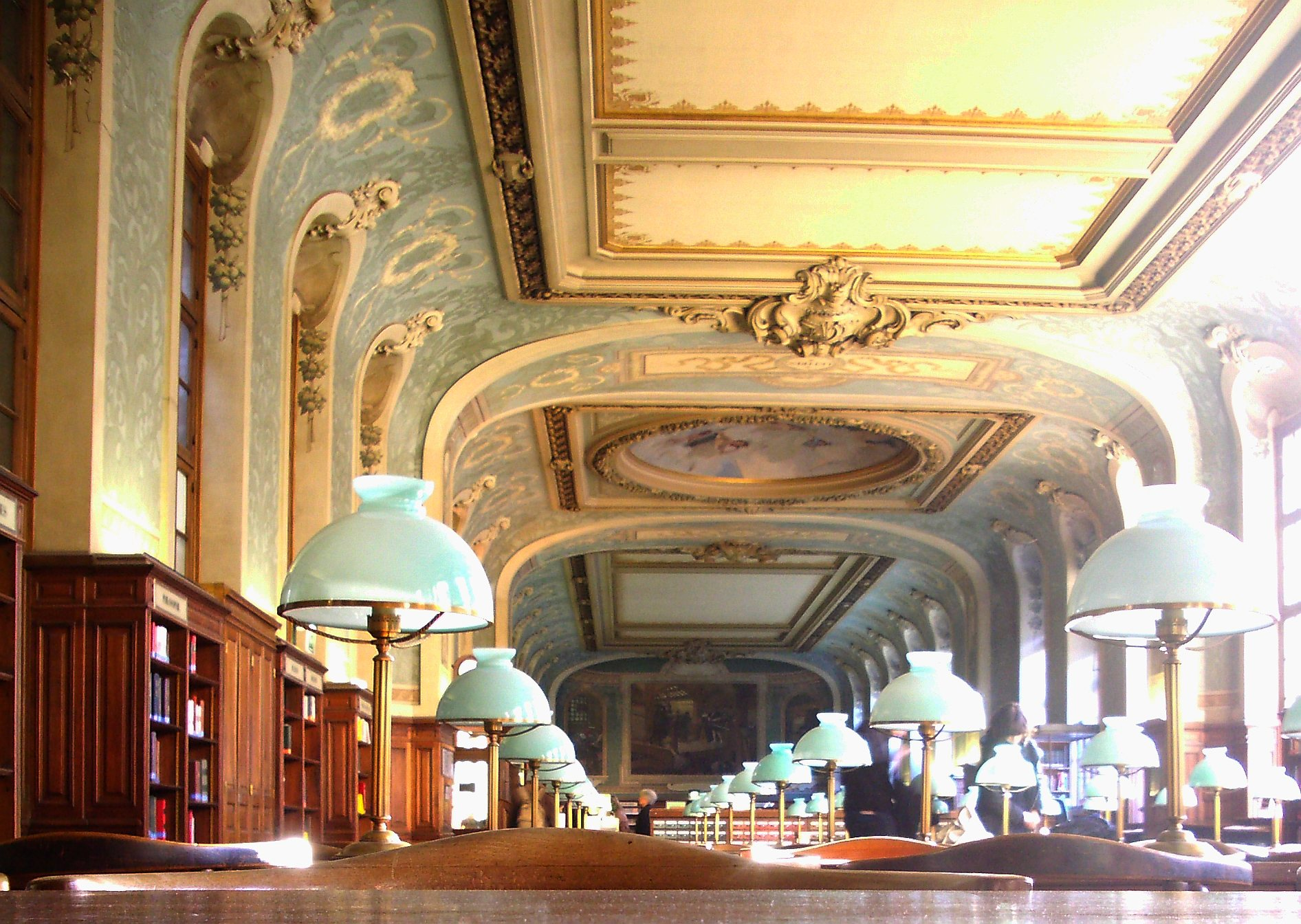
The Sorbonne Library, administered by Paris I

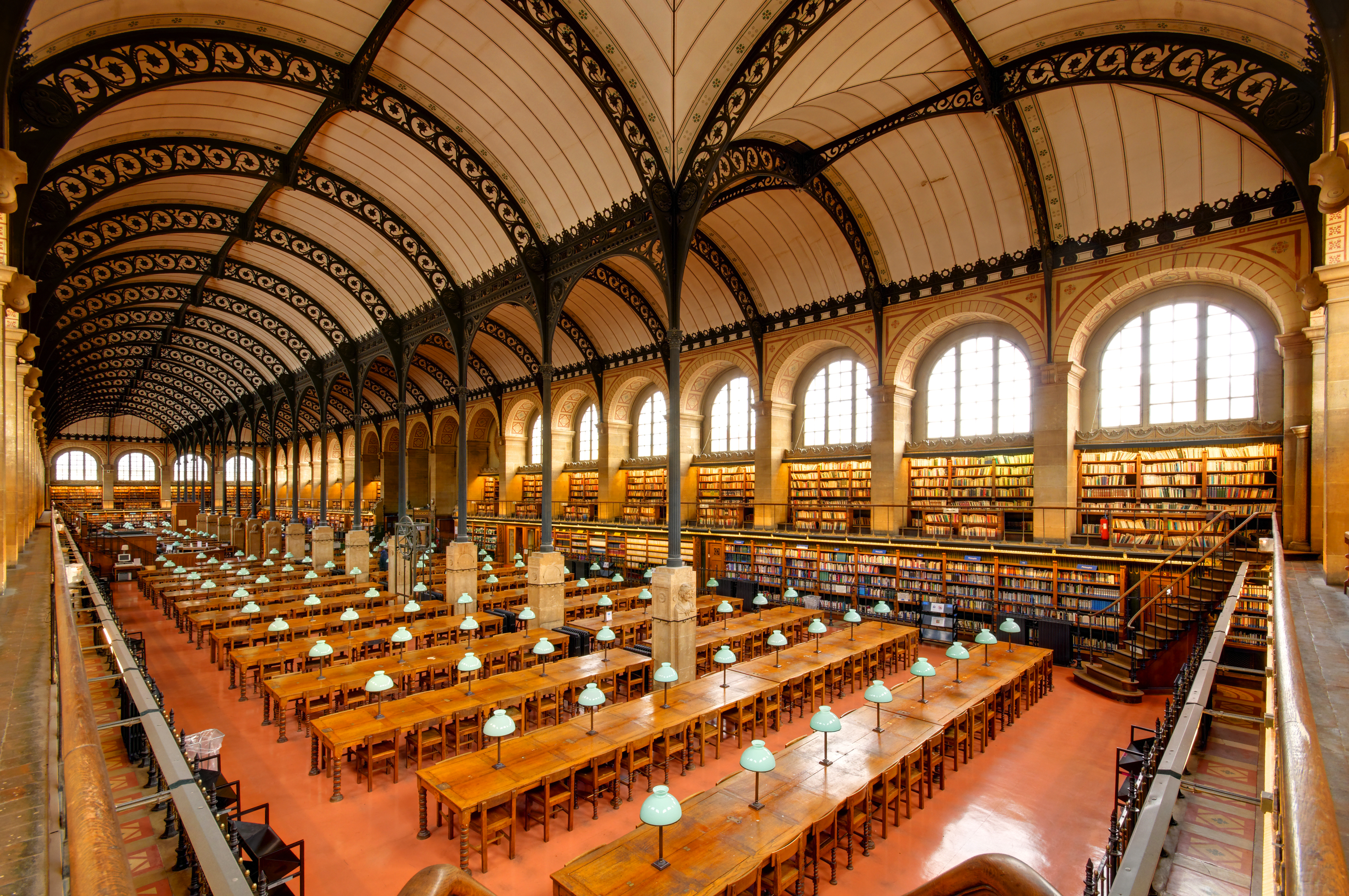
Reading room of Sainte-Geneviève Library, co-administered with Sorbonne Nouvelle University

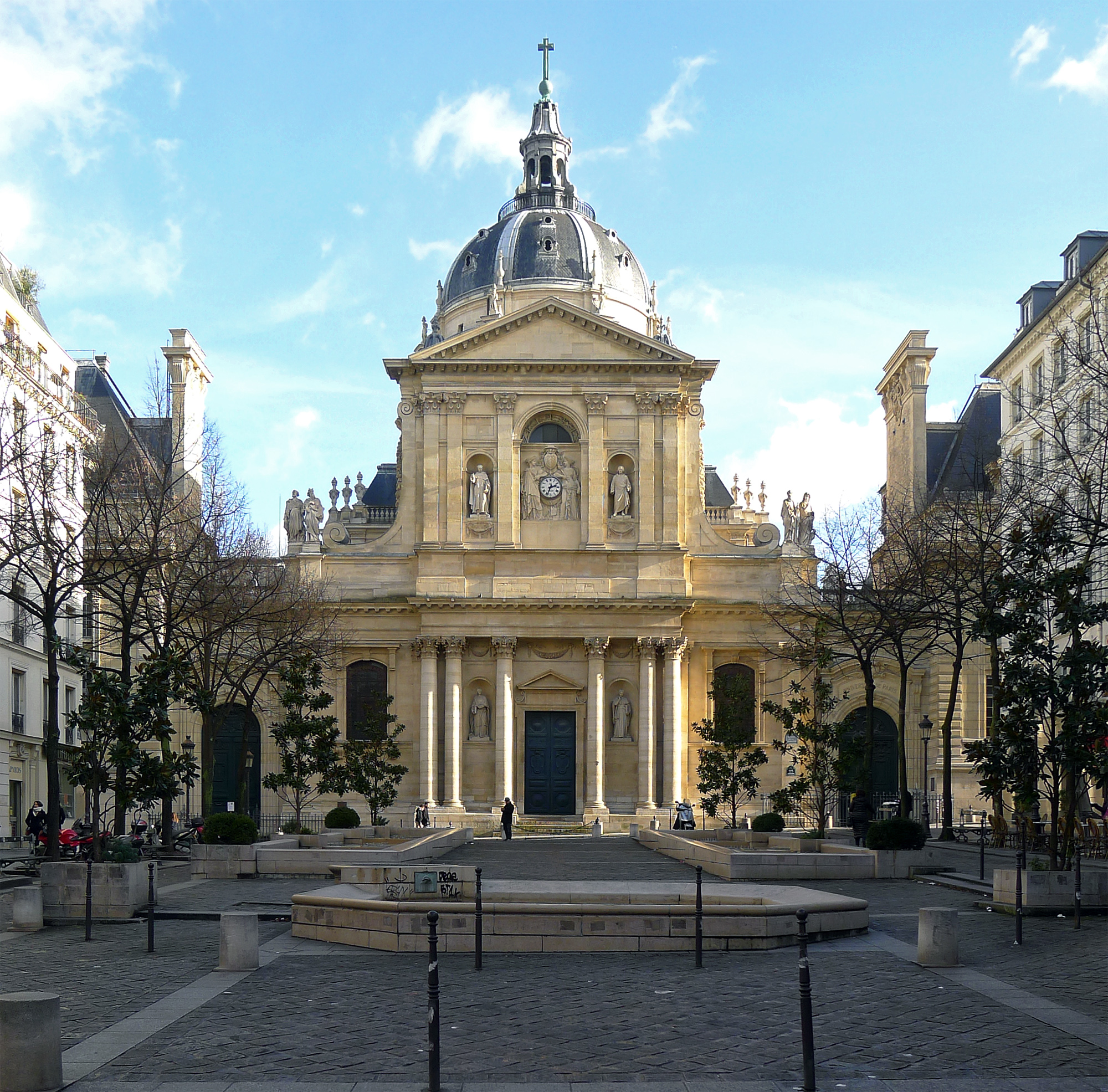
View of the Sorbonne, shared with Sorbonne University

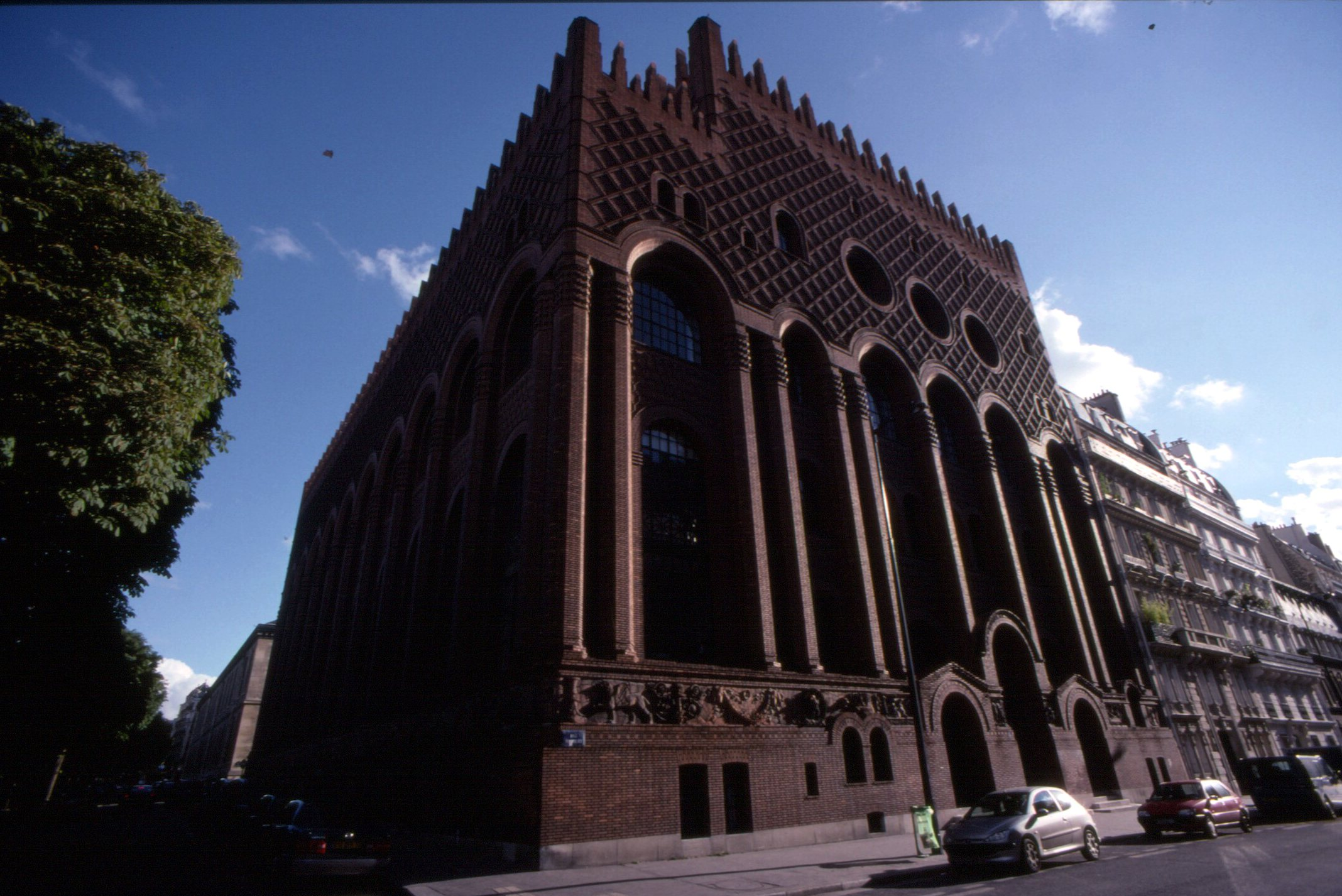
View of Michelet Centre, Paris I's campus for Archeology, shared with Sorbonne University

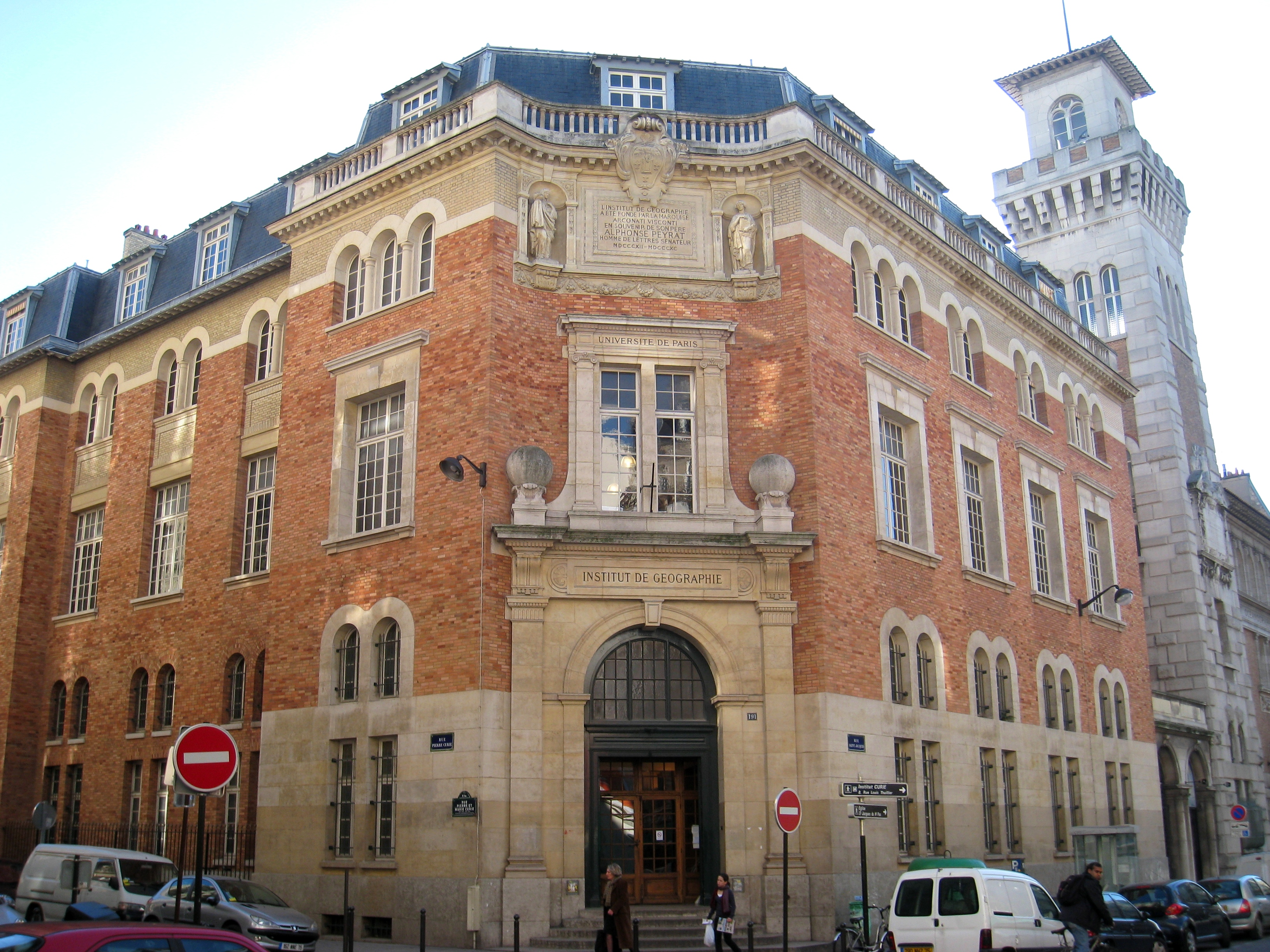
View of the Institut de Géographie, Paris I's campus for Geography

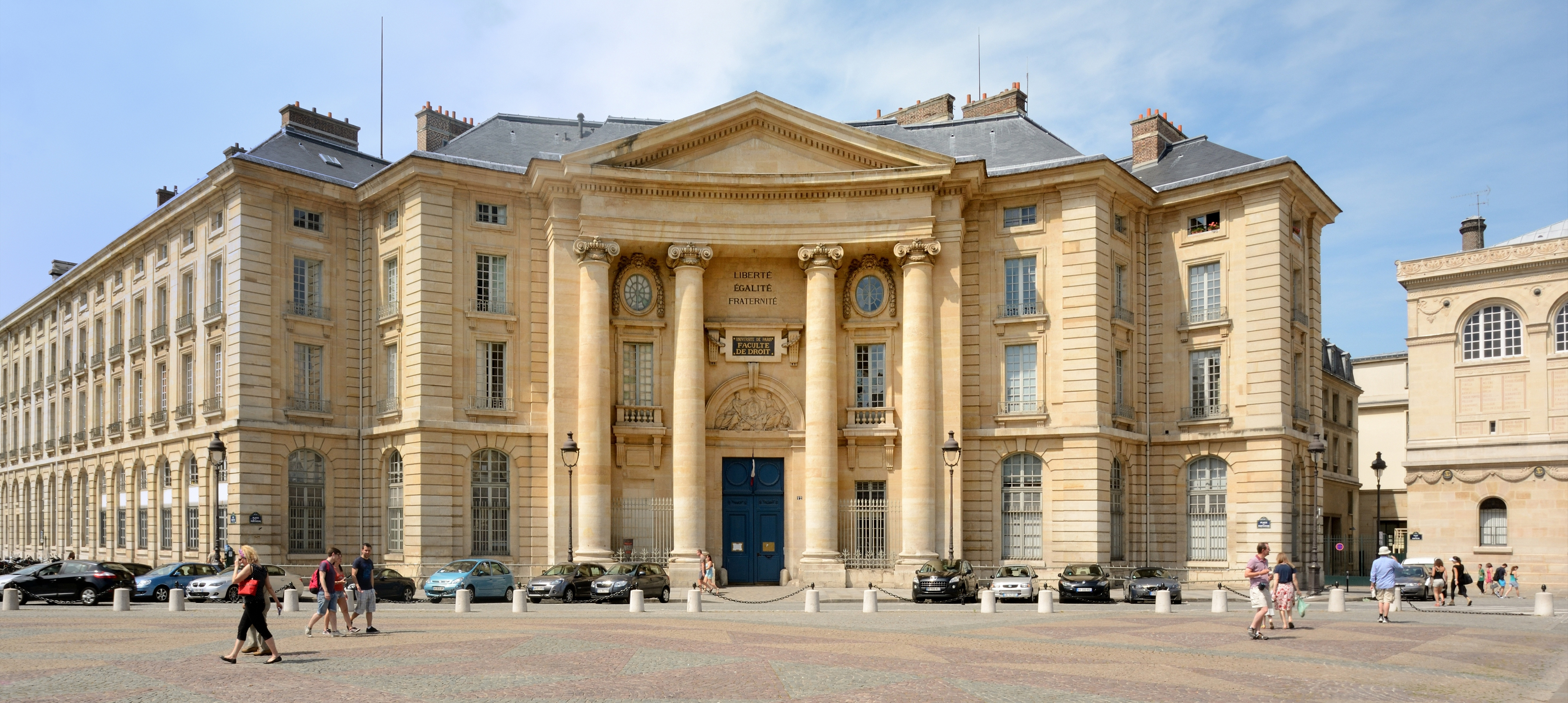
The Panthéon Centre, shared with Paris-Panthéon-Assas University

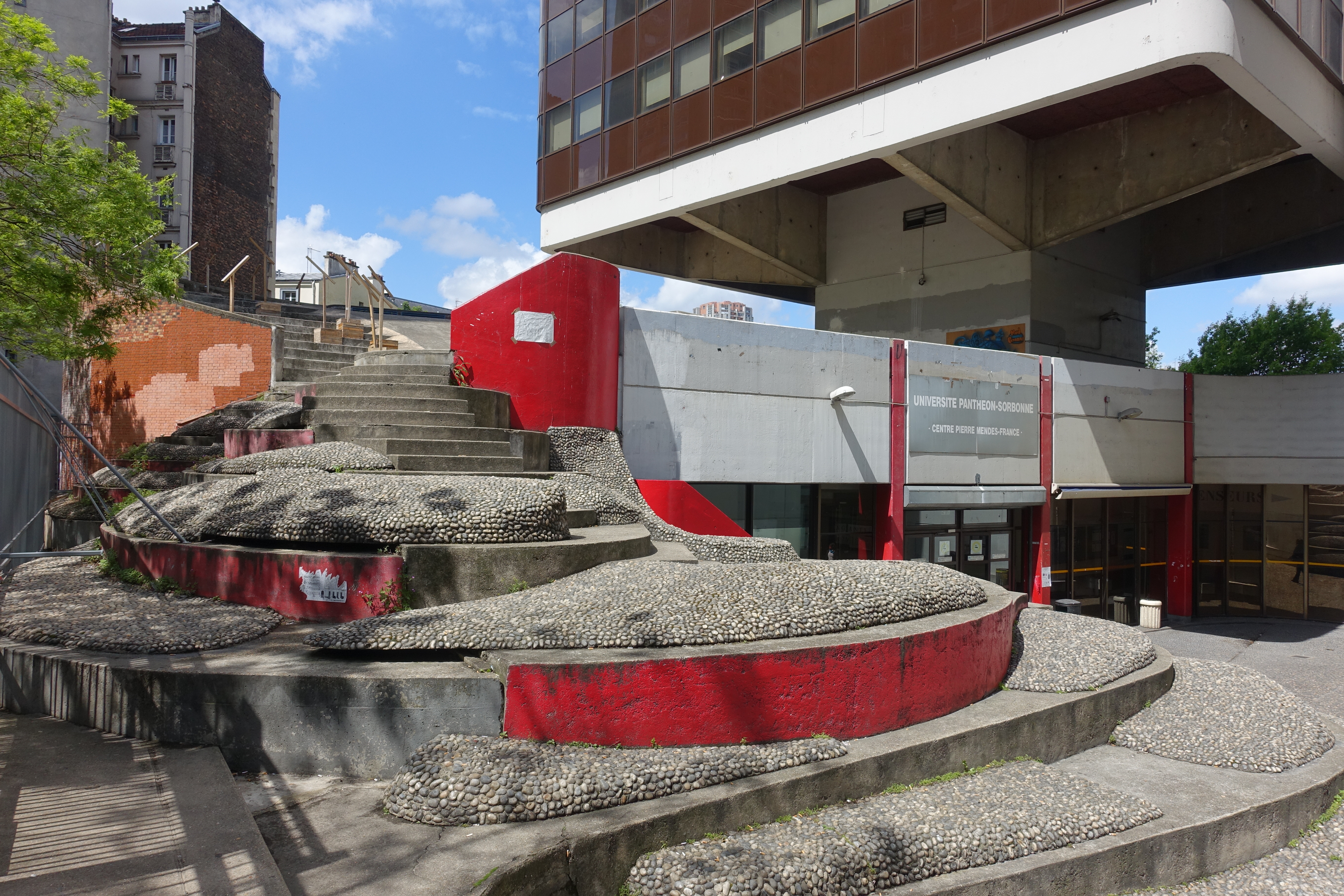
Pierre-Mendès-France Centre, called Paris I's "Tolbiac" campus

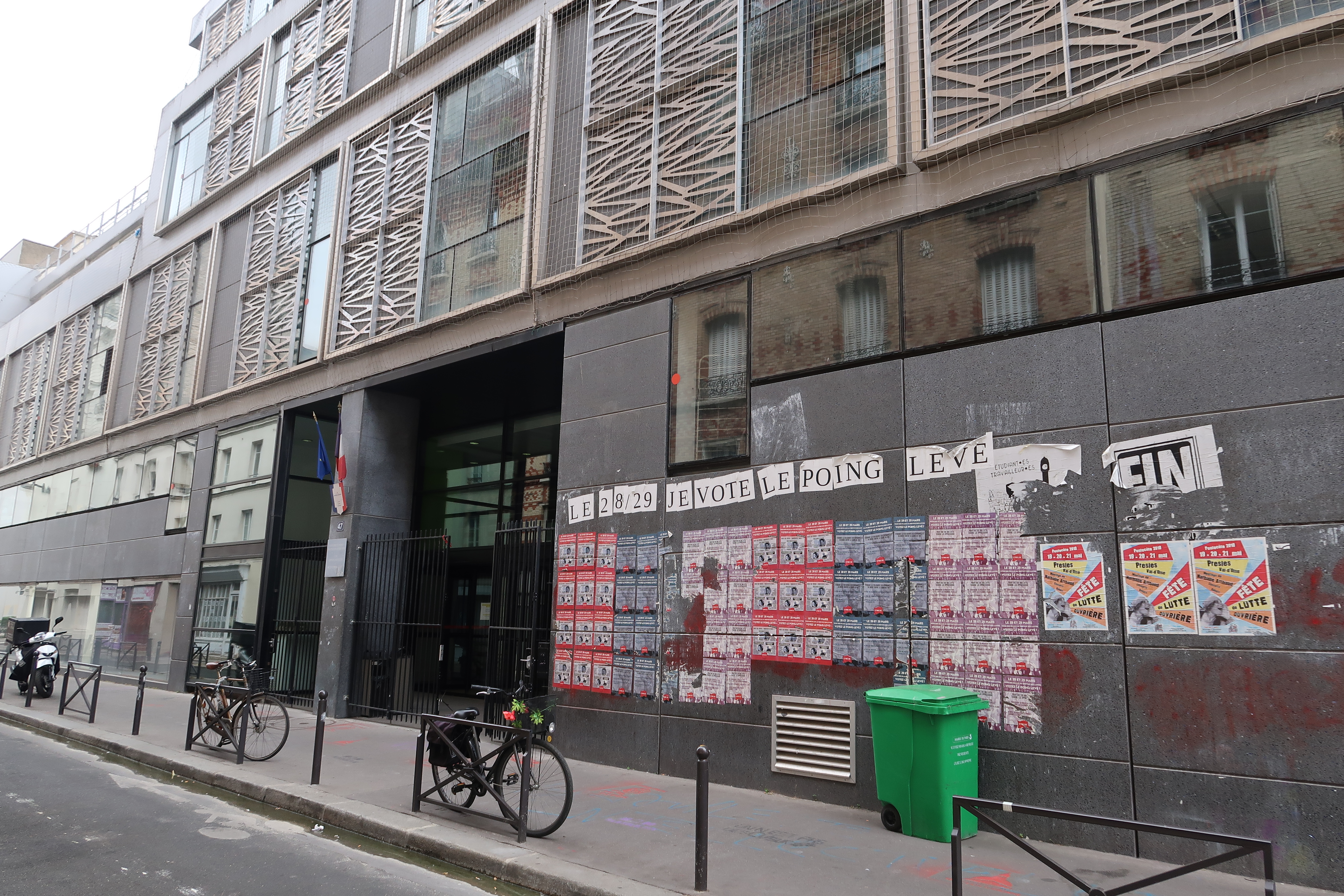
View of the Sorbonne School of Arts, or the Saint-Charles Centre

==== Panthéon Centre ====
The Panthéon Centre, which should not be confused with the Panthéon itself, was the building of the Faculty of Law of the former University of Paris and is located opposite the Panthéon. It was designed by Jacques-Germain Soufflot in 1760 as part of a new architectural ensemble for the Montagne Sainte-Geneviève. The Faculty of Law building was completed in 1744.

At the end of the 19th century, when the Sorbonne was undergoing major reforms, an extension was planned for the Panthéon Centre, designed by Louis-Ernest Lheureux. The extension took place in two phases, 1876–1878 and 1891–1899, and gave rise to the construction of a large new building connected to the 18th century facade. Together, they now occupied the entire city block. The construction of the Cujas wing, an 8-storey building on rue Cujas designed by the architect Jacques Becmeur, comprising a car park, an amphitheater, and 4 floors of offices, is connected to the historic buildings by a monumental staircase which was later decorated by the students of the Sorbonne Fine Arts Department (UFR d'Arts Plastiques). The main courtyard and the facades of the original building were listed as Historic Monuments in 1926.

The Panthéon Centre is home to the prestigious Sorbonne Law School and is shared with the Assas Law School of Paris-Panthéon-Assas University. The Panthéon Centre houses the head office of the university.

==== Sorbonne Centre ====
The Sorbonne Centre houses multiple departments of Panthéon-Sorbonne University, including the Department of Management (École de Management de la Sorbonne), History (École d’histoire de la Sorbonne), Philosophy (UFR de Philosophie), Political Science (UFR de Science Politique) and part of the Economics and Law departments. It is one of the main campuses of the university. It is shared with Sorbonne University.

==== Institute of Geography ====
The Institute of Geography was built between 1914 and 1926 by Henri-Paul Nénot. The institute was designed to bring together in a single building the collections, teaching, and research in geography, hitherto divided between the faculties of arts and sciences. The building is connected to the neighboring Oceanographic Institute by a double arch to form the Curie campus.

The occupation of the Institute of Geography results from a decree of 1 December 1980, concerning joint ownership between the three universities Paris 1, Paris 4 (today Sorbonne University), Paris 7 (today Paris Cité University), and the Sorbonne Library. Today, the building houses students of the Geography department from the 3rd year of their bachelor's degree.

=== Other campuses in Paris ===
==== Michelet Centre (Institute of Art and Archeology) ====
The Institute of Art and Archeology was built on the site of the former Institute of Applied Chemistry of the Faculty of Sciences by the architect Paul Bigot (1870–1942). The building offers, in particular, for the gaze of walkers, at the base of the large arcades, a frieze formed of terracotta bas-reliefs reproducing famous works of world art (Parthenon, Ara Pacis Augustae, etc.). The syncretism desired by Paul Bigot gives the Institute of Art and Archeology an educational virtue that resonates with the function of the building. Inside, the entrance vestibule, the amphitheater and the large reading room of the library, which occupies the heart of the building, have retained their volumes, but, on the floors, the galleries which housed the collections The heritage structures constituted in the Sorbonne and Paul Bigot's plan of Rome were abolished in the 1970s in favor of a partitioning of spaces into classrooms and teachers' offices, following the massification of higher education.

Initially designed for 200 students and 3 professors, the building now houses, equally, the Sorbonne School of Art History and Archeology of Paris 1 Panthéon-Sorbonne and the Art History and Archeology Department of Sorbonne University (formerly Paris 4), several thousand students, and nearly 150 tenured teacher-researchers. Property of the French Government, the Institute of Art and Archeology is assigned, by ministerial decree of 30 June 1983, in endowment to the two universities Paris 1 and Paris IV and registered in this form in the registers of the State. It has been classified as a Historic Monument since 9 September 1996.

==== Port-Royal Campus ====
The new Port-Royal Campus is spread over two neighboring sites: the René-Cassin building located at 17 rue Saint-Hippolyte and, on the other side of the street, the former Lourcine barracks, which covers the entire block between boulevard de Port-Royal and rue de la Glacière, Broca and Saint-Hippolyte.

The René-Cassin site is made up of two buildings: a 19th-century building acquired by the Ministry of National Education in 1957 and restructured in 1987, but above all, a new building built between 1987 and 1990 by the architects Jacques Ripault and Denise Duhart.

The former Lourcine barracks, located at 37 Boulevard Port-Royal, is one of the oldest military sites in Paris. Matured since 2011, the project to create a new law campus was entrusted in 2014 to the Public Establishment for University Development of the Ile de France region (EPAURIF) with a contracting authority mandate. The architectural challenge of the project was to preserve this heritage, testimony of the urban history of this district, by touching it as little as possible, while developing it in an optimal way.

In addition to the three buildings on the Lourcine block, the current René-Cassin center has been attached to the new site to form the Port-Royal Campus from the start of the 2019 academic year. This new center of Paris 1 Panthéon-Sorbonne allows, among others, the grouping of sites dedicated to legal disciplines. It provides students, teachers, researchers, and staff with modern working and study facilities. More than 2,400 people now occupy this new campus.

==== Pierre Mendès-France Centre (Tolbiac) ====
In November 1970, Olivier Guichard, then Minister of National Education, decided to build a new university education center at the corner of rue de Tolbiac and rue de Baudricourt in the 13th arrondissement. In January 1971, the architects Michel Andraut and Pierre Parat were entrusted with the construction of the new building. The model of the project was presented by the architects on November 16, 1971. After two years of construction, the new university center opened its doors in the fall of 1973 under the name of "Multidisciplinary Center of Tolbiac".

Renamed in 1983 in honor of the French politician Pierre Mendès France, the Center Pierre-Mendès-France was built in the context of post-68 university programs and the urban renewal of the Italy XIII sector undertaken since 1964. The site – a cramped triangular plot of 7,500 m^{2} hitherto occupied by a deposit of cobblestones – led to the original and ambitious choice of vertical development, which is quite unusual in terms of university architecture. The architects imagined a high-rise building (IGH) composed of three towers of unequal heights built around a central reinforced concrete core: tower A is nine stories high, tower B sixteen, and tower C of twenty-two. Andrault and Parat worked on the building in a quest for functionality and formal expressiveness, which involves deconstructing the volumes, vigorously linking the lift towers, ensuring vertical circulation in the building, "urban modules" which are these “suspended” cubic volumes sheltering the offices and the classrooms, and the amphitheatres which unfold in a corolla at the base of the building. This sculptural work is extended by a brutalist aesthetic based on the association of rough concrete, smoked glass, bricks, pebbles, or even by the moving "landscape" imagined within the framework of the 1% artistic by Bernard Alleaume and Yvette Vincent-Alleaume at the base of the building to enliven the spaces overlooking rue de Tolbiac.

The Pierre-Mendès-France Campus currently welcomes around 6,000 first and second-year undergraduate students in human sciences, economics, and management.

- Tolbiac Center: a secondary building of the Mendès-France Center (which confusingly is also called Tolbiac).

=== List of other campuses in the Paris region ===
There are other campuses of Paris 1 in the Parisian areas:

- Condorcet Campus: a new inter-university campus shared with other universities, in Aubervilliers.
- Albert Châtelet Campus: commonly called Calvin, it is a secondary building of the Sorbonne.
- Rue d'Ulm Campus: like Calvin, a secondary building of the Sorbonne.
- Institute of Philosophy of Sciences and Techniques (IHPST): located in the Rue du Four.
- Mahler Campus: located in the 4th arrondissement, it houses the Sorbonne School of Art History and Archeology.
- Saint-Charles Campus: located in the 15th arrondissement. Founded in 1973, it houses the Sorbonne School of Arts (arts and cinema).
- Sorbonne Economic Sciences House: located in the 13th arrondissement. It houses the Sorbonne School of Economics.
- Broca Campus: Located in the 5th arrondissement. It houses the Sorbonne School of Management.
- International Building: located on Boulevard Arago, commonly called Arago. It houses the International Relations Institute.
- Fontenay Campus: located in the suburban town of Fontenay-aux-Roses, in the old buildings of the École Normale Supérieure. It houses the Sorbonne Institute of Social Sciences of Work:
  - Sceaux Campus: in the suburban town of Sceaux, it is a secondary building of the Fontenay Center.
  - Bourg-la-Reine Campus: located in Bourg-la-Reine, it is a secondary building of the Fontenay Center.
  - Nogent Campus: located in Nogent-sur-Marne, it is a secondary building of the Fontenay Center.

== Organisation and administration ==
=== Departments ===
==== Sorbonne School of History ====
Teaching and research are spread over several sites in Paris: on the left bank, in the Latin Quarter (Sorbonne, Panthéon, Centre rue du Four) and in the Pierre Mendès France Centre (Tolbiac); on the right bank (Institut National d'Histoire de l'Art, Centre rue Malher, and the Condorcet Campus on the La Plaine, Aubervilliers site, and in 2024 on the La Chapelle, Paris site). The School has 17 specialized libraries, among the richest in the world in their scientific fields, for books and document collections, and for access to digital holdings. The Sorbonne Library is an additional resource.

==== Sorbonne School of Arts ====
The Sorbonne School of Arts (École des arts de la Sorbonne, EAS) is the Plastic Arts and Art Sciences Department (UFR 04) of the University of Paris 1 Panthéon-Sorbonne, which teaches art through its most contemporary issues, through practice, but also the analysis of works and their mediation. The school offers a variety of courses ranging from Visual Arts, Cinema and Audiovisual, to Cinema/Management, as well as Aesthetics and Art Sciences, Design, Arts and Media, Arts and Culture, and a Preparatory Course for the Teaching Profession (PPPE) specialized in Plastic Arts.

Located in the heart of the 15th arrondissement, at 47 rue des Bergers, in a building of more than 7000 square meters entirely dedicated to it – the Saint Charles Centre – the EAS welcomes nearly 3000 students. It has a university library specifically dedicated to art and creation, an amphitheater, a contemporary art gallery, classrooms for theoretical courses, workshops for artistic practices (sculpture, painting, ceramics, silk-screen printing, engraving, a silver and digital photography laboratory, a Fab Lab...), an office for the loan of audiovisual material, computer rooms, editing rooms, etc.

==== Sorbonne Law School ====
Panthéon-Sorbonne united in 2009 all legal studies in the university and gave the new department the name of École de droit de la Sorbonne ("Sorbonne Law School").

The Panthéon-Sorbonne University School of Law has held, since 1993 with Cornell University, the "Cornell Law School-Université Paris I Panthéon-Sorbonne Summer Institute of Comparative and International Law".

Since 7 March 2022, Chantal Arens, First President of the Court of Cassation, signed a partnership agreement between the Court of Cassation and the Panthéon-Sorbonne University. This partnership will result in the organization of colloquiums, the development of research projects involving judges of the Court of Cassation, and will allow the hosting of student interns within the Court.

==== Sorbonne School of Economics ====
The Sorbonne School of Economics (EES, formerly UFR02 – Economics) was created in 1971.

==== Other ====
- Sorbonne School of Art History and Archeology
- Sorbonne School of Management
- Sorbonne Department of Geography
- Sorbonne Department of Philosophy
- Sorbonne School of Political Science
- Sorbonne Department of Applied Mathematics and Computer Science

=== Institutes ===
- Sorbonne Graduate Business School
- Institute for the Study of Economic and Social Development (IEDES)
- Paris Demography Institute (IDUP)
- Institute for Research and Advanced Studies in Tourism (IREST)
- Institute of Labour Studies (ISST)
- Institute of Philosophy of Sciences and Techniques (IHPST)
- Institute for War and Peace Studies
- Institute of Juridical and Philosophical Sciences (ISJPS)

=== Sorbonne Publishing ===
Sorbonne Publishing (Editions de la Sorbonne) is a publishing house of the Panthéon-Sorbonne University. It has published over 700 books since 1971 and publishes approximately 50 new titles a year.

== Academics ==
=== Undergraduate admission ===
Panthéon-Sorbonne receives the most applications, with more than 113,000 applicants for only 6,164 places. More than 22.84% of students accepted by the university having received highest honors ("mention très bien") in high school during the 2019 session (first of France).

In Law, in 2021, the rate of "with honors" and "with highest honors" mentions among the admitted students reached a high of 91% (second of France, after Panthéon-Assas).

=== Research ===
Every year, around 400 PhD theses are defended, and 1,700 pre-PhD post-graduate degrees are awarded in 74 subjects, divided between 15 graduate schools.

=== Documentary resource centers ===
In Economics, the library at the Centre Pierre Mendès France offers students free access to its large collection.

In Law, the Cujas Library, co-administered with Panthéon-Assas, with its computerized documentation service, provides access to over 500 data banks and is the largest law and economics library in France.

In Humanities, The Sorbonne Library, a common library of Panthéon-Sorbonne University, Sorbonne-Nouvelle University, Sorbonne University, and Paris Cité University. It is administered by Panthéon-Sorbonne University as per a governing agreement signed among these universities in 2000. It has a collection of almost three million books, 100,000 of which are more than 200 years old, and 17,500 periodicals covering all the humanities. The library and map collection of the Geography Institute are the oldest such collections in France. In addition, the 400,000 volumes in the specialist libraries offer users one of the largest collections in France and Europe.

=== International ===
Panthéon-Sorbonne has signed over 150 conventions with foreign universities across five continents. These exchanges revolve around international networks such as Europaeum which bring together Oxford, London, Bologna, Bonn, Geneva, Helsinki, Leiden and Prague. The University of Paris I also heads a number of consortia which bring together French universities and professional organisations. The consortia are responsible for major international projects in Bucharest, Buenos Aires, Cairo, Istanbul (Galatasaray), and Moscow.

Every year, some 130 academics from foreign universities come to teach and do research at the University of Paris I. Many researchers and members of faculty take part in major international research programs abroad; the university also hosts many annual international conferences. Six thousand international students, mainly from Europe, come to study as part of the SOCRATES or TEMPUS programmes. African students are joined by increasing numbers from Asia and America, and take part in specific programs organised in conjunction with universities across the world.

=== Dual and double degree programs ===
At Panthéon-Sorbonne, students can apply for admission to one of the dual degree or double degree programs designed in conjunction with partner universities in France and abroad. Double degree programs confer two degrees to students, whereas dual degrees confer a degree from the host university only.

== Rankings ==
=== International rankings ===
University rankings

Global – Overall
- QS World: =257 (2026)
- THE World: 801–1000 (2026)

In 2021, Panthéon-Sorbonne was globally ranked 287th (9th of France) by QS World University Rankings and 601–800th (32nd of France) by The Times Higher Education. It does not currently appear in the latest US News ranking of world universities. Regarding world reputation, it was ranked 101–125th in The Times Higher Education World Reputation Rankings of 2021.

By area or subject, it was ranked:

- In the 2021 QS World University Rankings
  - Arts and Humanities: 31st (1st in France)
    - Classics & Ancient History: 12th (2nd in France)
    - Archaeology: 25th (1st in France)
    - Philosophy: 27th (2nd in France)
    - History: 33rd (1st in France)
    - Geography: 35th (1st in France)
    - Modern Languages: 67th (3rd in France)
    - Art & Design: 101st–150th (4th in France)
    - Architecture & Built Environment: 151st-200th (1st in France)
  - Social Sciences: 62nd (4th in France)
    - Law: 20th (1st in France)
    - Development Studies: 37th (1st in France)
    - Economics & Econometrics: 80h (3rd in France)
    - Politics & International Studies: 51st–100th (2nd in France)
    - Anthropology: 51st–100th (1st in France, tied)
    - Social Policy & Administration: 101st–120th (2nd in France)
    - Accounting & Finance: 101st–150th (5th in France, tied)
    - Business & Management studies: 101st–150th (7th in France, tied)
- In the 2022 Times Higher Education:
  - Arts and Humanities: 47th (2nd in France)
  - Law: 48th (1st in France)
  - Social Sciences: 251-300 (6th in France)
  - Business and Economics: 251-300 (6th in France)

=== National rankings ===
Economics and business

In Economics, its undergraduate program is ranked second among French universities by Eduniversal. Its masters programs are ranked 4th among French Universities or academic institutions by Eduniversal.

In Business, Panthéon-Sorbonne is ranked 14 by Eduniversal, second among the universities, behind Paris Dauphine University.

Law

Panthéon-Sorbonne law programs are globally ranked second by Eduniversal.

Panthéon-Sorbonne undergraduate law program are ranked as follow:

- Law: 2nd
- Law and Economics: 2nd
- Law and English: 2nd

Graduate programs are ranked as follows:

- Social Law: 2nd and 3rd
- Digital Law: 3rd
- Tax law: 5th

In terms of salary, Panthéon-Sorbonne law graduates are ranked second in France.

Humanities

No national ranking exists in Humanities.

== Controversies ==
=== Tolbiac blockades ===
The Tolbiac center of Paris 1, which previously hosted the undergraduate lectures in law, is regularly subject to blockades, which cause cancellation of all lectures for up to several months, including in 1995, 1997, 2006, 2007–09, 2010, and 2018.

=== Attempts of automatic pass for students ===
Student unions regularly demand that the university grant student an automatic pass, in particular at each blockade or strike. In 2020, during the covid crisis, the committee at Paris I in charge of exams decided to grant that right (i.e. to cancel marks under 10), but some professors asked the courts to cancel this decision A first court validated the decision of the committee, but a second one cancelled its decision.

== Notable people ==
This list includes notable people affiliated with the Panthéon-Sorbonne University. For people affiliated with the University of Paris, which ceased to exist in 1970, see List of University of Paris people.

=== Notable academics ===
- Michèle Alliot-Marie: State doctorate in political science, former director of the Faculty of Political Science, former Minister (Defense, Interior, Justice and Foreign Affairs) and former UMP MP in the National Assembly.
- Jeannette Bougrab, Associate Professor of Law
- Christian de Boissieu, Professor of Economics
- Jane Freedman, former Marie Curie Professor of Politics and International Relations
- Jean-Claude Colliard, director of the Department of Political Science
- Jean-Pierre Cot, Professor of international law
- Alpha Condé, professor emeritus of law, former President of Guinea
- Olga Kisseleva, Professor of Art, founder of Art & Science program of the Sorbonne
- Josepha Laroche, Professor of political science
- Louis Lévy-Garboua, Professor of Behavioral Economics
- Daniel Roche, historian
- Michel Serres, philosopher
- Nicolas Warembourg, Professor of Law

=== Notable alumni ===
- Sergio de Mello: former UN High Commissioner for Human Rights
- Yves-Marie Adeline: PhD in Arts and art writer
- Samir Assaf: DEA Money Finance Bank, CEO of HSBC Global Banking & Markets
- Maurice Benayoun: PhD in Arts and Art Sciences, international artist, Professor at City University of Hong Kong.
- Christian de Boissieu: doctor in economics, professor and director of the Council of Economic Analysis
- Ali Bongo Ondimba: President of Gabon, the son of former President Omar Bongo and the Minister of Defence from 1999 to 2009.
- Jean-Louis Borloo: former minister, LLB
- Rosi Braidotti: contemporary philosopher and feminist theoretician, distinguished Professor in the Humanities at University of Utrecht
- Jorge Castañeda: Professor at New York University and former Foreign Minister of Mexico.
- Luc Chatel: Master of Science in management, Master of Marketing, Secretary of State for Consumer Affairs and Tourism to the Minister of Economy, Finance and Employment, and spokesman for the UMP, former Minister of National Education
- Alpha Condé: politician and current President of the Republic of Guinea.
- Régis Debray: ENS, Doctor of Philosophy
- Thierry Derez: CEO Covéa
- Harlem Désir: degree in philosophy, now MEP
- Hazem El Beblawi: Former Prime Minister of Egypt
- Myriam El Khomri: Masters in Political Sciences, former Minister of Labour
- Abdullah Ensour: Former Prime Minister of the Hashemite Kingdom of Jordan
- Taieb Fassi Fihri: Moroccan Minister of Foreign Affairs and Cooperation
- Sylvie Faucheux: president of the University of Versailles-Saint-Quentin-en-Yvelines
- Silvia Filippini-Fantoni: PhD, Italian museum director, based in the United States
- Laurence Ferrari: Master of political and social communication, journalist
- Olivia Fox Cabane: author, business consultant, and public speaker
- Jean Claude Gandur: former chairman and CEO of Addax Petroleum
- Irakli Garibashvili: Prime Minister of Georgia
- Shaul Gordon: Canadian-Israeli Olympic sabre fencer
- Rima Hassan: jurist and politician
- Alfredo Tjiurimo Hengari: PhD in Politics, Namibian Special Advisor (on Media) to President Hage Geingob
- Théodore Holo: President of the High Court of Justice of Benin and former Minister
- Miloš Jovanović: Serbian political scientist and a politician, president of the Democratic Party of Serbia.
- Chantal Jouanno: Minister of Youth and Sports, control of economic and social administration
- Franck Julien: president of the TFN
- Giorgos Kaminis: Mayor of the capital of Greece (Athens) and Greek Ombudsman from April 2003 until September 2010
- Andreas Kaplan: economist
- Olga Kisseleva: PhD in Arts and Art Sciences, international artist, Professor at the Sorbonne Art School.
- Jean-Marc Lofficier: writer and publisher
- Fabrizio Marrella: PhD in International Law, Full Professor of International Law (Venice and Rome, Italy); arbitrator and Counsel; honorary Dean HRV of the European Inter-University Center for Human Rights
- Ibrahim Hassane Mayaki: PhD in public law, politician, former Prime Minister of Niger
- Arnaud Montebourg: LLB, French Minister of Industrial Renewal
- André Mba Obame: former interior minister in Gabon, losing the presidential election in 2009
- Daniel Ona Ondo PhD in economics, academic and politician in Gabon
- Renganaden Padayachy: PhD in economics, Minister of Finance (Mauritius)
- Vincent Peillon: Bachelor, CAPES, aggregation, and doctorate in philosophy. Former MEP, former member of the Somme, and the current Minister of National Education.
- Corine Pelluchon: philosopher and professor
- Emmanuelle Polack: art historian, provenance researcher, director of research at the Musée du Louvre.
- Yazid Sabeg: CS executive and communication systems, and Commissioner for Diversity and Equal Opportunities since 17 December 2008
- Maristela Salvatori: Brazilian printmaker
- Manal Abdel Samad: Lebane politician and former Minister of Information
- Minata Samaté Cessouma, Burkinabè diplomat and Commissioner of the African Union
- Alexander Stubb: former Prime Minister and current President of Finland
- William Sweet: DEA in Political Sciences, philosopher, member of the Royal Society of Canada.
- Jean-Pierre Thiollet: writer
- Manuel Valls: degree in History; Mayor of Évry, Essonne, and former Prime minister
- Laurent Wauquiez: masters in History, former Minister of Higher Education and Research

== See also ==
- Higher education in France
