= Josepha Laroche =

Professor and author

Josepha Laroche is a French professor of political science, specializing in international relations. She is professor at the University of Paris 1 Pantheon-Sorbonne, where she is Director of the master's program of research in international relations, and is also researcher at the UMR 201 Développement et sociétés. She was also Institut d'Études Politiques de Paris (Sciences Po Paris) from 2004 to 2009.

Her research is dedicated to globalization, global governance and global public goods.

In 2009, she founded Chaos International, a Transnational Center of Studies and Researches dedicated to promote a transnational analysis on the global scene.

She is editor of the academic series, Chaos International L'Harmattan Publisher.

== Books ==
- Recueil de nouvelles noires : A pic, Paris, Maïa, 2025.
- Il suffit d'un rien, Paris, L'Harmattan, 2024.
- Freud 1918-1939 - La détresse d'une époque, Paris, L'Harmattan, 2024;
- Freud, L'énergie du désespoir, 1917, Paris, L'Harmattan, 2024;
- Freud à Paris, Paris, Vérone, 2020.
- De l'Interétatique au transnational, Paris, L'Harmattan, 2018, 140 p.
- Les Marxistes dans la théorie des conflits internationaux, Paris, L’Harmattan, 2018, 346 p.
- La Deuxième Guerre mondiale au cinéma, le jeu trouble des identités, avec une préface de Christophe Malavoy, Paris L'Harmattan, 2017, 188 p.
- Les Réalistes dans la théorie des conflits internationaux, 2 e éd., Paris, L’Harmattan, 2016, 310 p. 5
- La Grande Guerre au cinéma, un pacifisme sans illusions, avec une préface de Christophe Malavoy, Paris, L’Harmattan, 2014, 149 p.
- Les Prix Nobel, sociologie d'une élite transnationale, Montréal, Liber, 2012.
- La Brutalisation du monde, du retrait des Etats à la décivilisation, Montréal, Liber, 2012.
- The Brutalization of the World. From the Retreat of States to Decivilization, Springer International Publishing, 2017, 124 p.
- O. Nay (Ed.), Lexique de science politique, 2e ed., Paris, Dalloz, 2011.
- Editor : Un Monde en sursis, dérives financières, régulations politiques et exigences éthiques, Paris, L’Harmattan, 2010. Coll. Chaos International.
- Josepha Laroche, Alexandre Bohas, Canal+ et les majors américaines : une vision désenchantée du cinéma-monde, Paris, 2005. Coll. Chaos International. (WorldCat)
- Editor: Mondialisation et gouvernance mondiale, Paris, PUF, 2003, 263 pages. Coll. IRIS.
- Editor: La Loyauté dans les relations internationales, 2e éd., Paris, L’Harmattan, 2011. Coll. Chaos International.
- Politique internationale, (with Susan Strange) 2e éd., Paris, LGDJ Montchrestien, 2000. (WorldCat)
- Les Prix Nobel, Paris, PUF, 1995. (Que Sais-je?. 3070). ISBN 978-2-13-047439-5 (WorldCat)

== Selected articles ==
- "Le Nobel comme enjeu symbolique", Revue Française de Science Politique, 44 (4), août 1994, pp. 599–628.

== Others ==
- "A Non-Aligned Movement without Credit", in : Chaos International, (75), October 5, 2012. (Chaos International)
- "Nobel Diplomacy", Academic Foresights, (6), Oct.-Dec 2012. (Academic Foresights)
- The Desecration of the Diplomatic Monopoly of States, The Appearance of U.S. Soldier Manning in Military Courts (Chaos International)
- A Symbolic Injunction (Chaos International)
- Transnational Movements against Child Labor (Chaos International)
- The Radicalism of the Nobel Diplomacy (Chaos International)
- The ICC's Normative Authority (Chaos International)
- A Global Re-Distribution of Political Authority (Chaos International)
- "Construction sociale d'une nouvelle sacralité : Les biens publics mondiaux", in : Paul Zawatski (Éd.), Le Sacré hors religions, Paris, L’Harmattan, 2008, pp. 227–239.
- "Science politique et relations internationales : mettons les pendules à l’heure ", in : Darras Éric, Philippe Olivier, (Éds.), La Science politique une et multiple, Paris, L'harmattan, Collection Logiques politiques, 2004, pp. 207–218.
- "Relire Kissinger : Le Congrès de Vienne ou la construction diplomatique d'une négation ", in : Bernard Cottret (Éd.), Du Patriotisme aux nationalismes, 1700-1848, France, Grande-Bretagne, Amérique du Nord, Paris, Creaphis, 2002, pp. 159–168.
- "Figures du diplomate dans l’œuvre d’Albert Cohen ", in : Poirmeur Yves, Mazet Pierre (Éds.), Le Métier politique en représentations, Paris, L’Harmattan, 1999, pp. 359–381.
- " La conscience malheureuse comme mode d’action internationale : le pacifisme de Romain Rolland", in : Currap (Éd.), Le For intérieur, Paris, PUF, 1995, pp. 137–149.

== Décoration ==
Chevalier de la légion d'honneur
