= Cujas Library =

Law library in Paris

Coordinates: 48°50′49″N 2°20′42″E

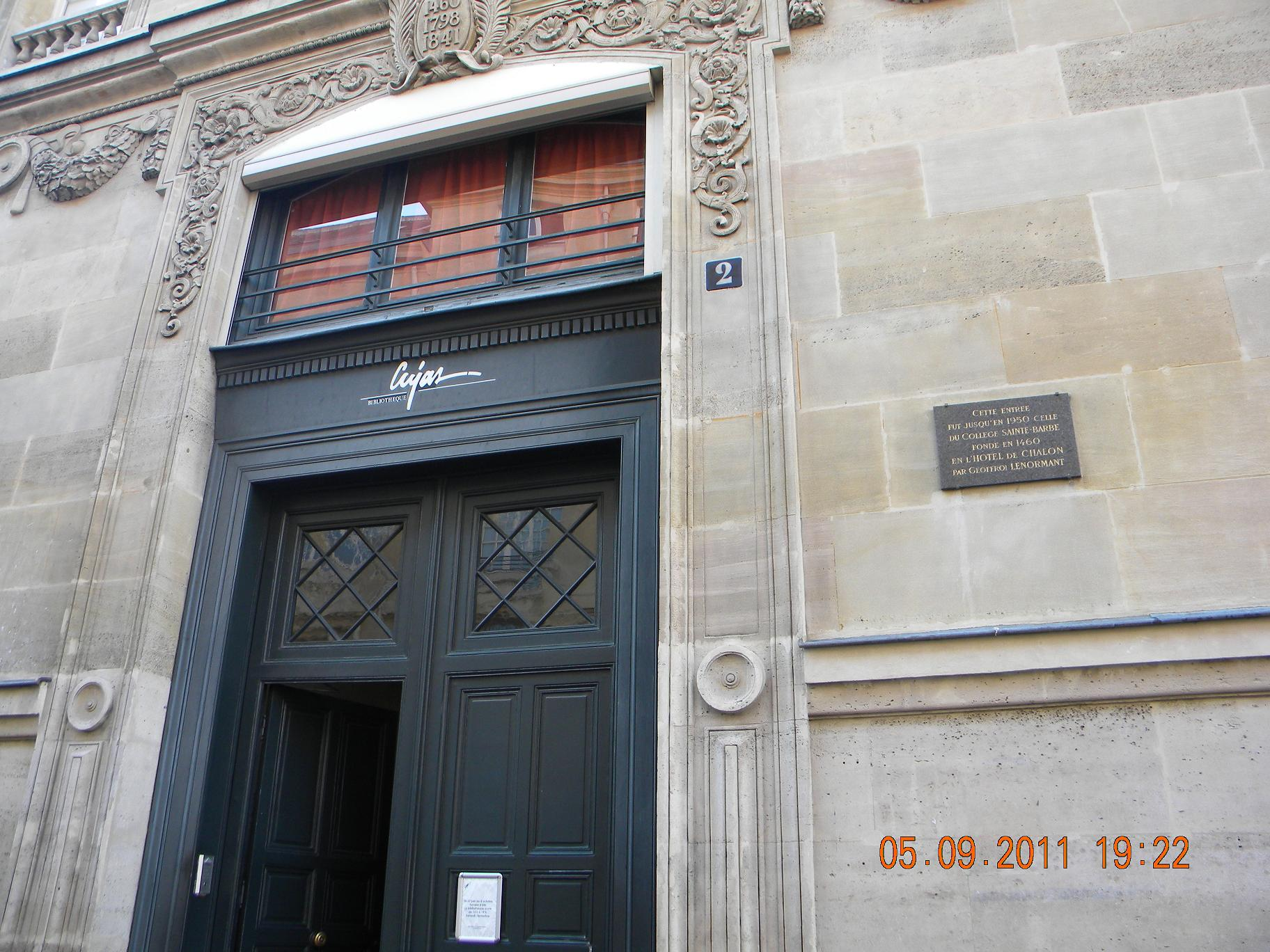
Main entrance of Cujas Library, Paris, France

Cujas Library (French: Bibliothèque Cujas), named after the French jurist and scholar Jacques Cujas (1520–1590), is an academic research library, and the largest law library in Europe. It is located in the Latin Quarter, next to the Panthéon and Sainte-Geneviève Library, in the 5th arrondissement of Paris.

== History ==
Cujas Library was originally the library of the Law School of the University of Paris (which dates back to 1215). The collections of the library were dispersed during the French Revolution. Consequently the current collections have been built since 1829 only.

From 1876 to 1914, Paul Viollet, head librarian, dedicated much effort to developing the library’s collections. At that time, the library was located in the main building of the Law School of Paris, on the Place du Panthéon. In 1958, a new building was opened to house the Library.

In 1970, the University of Paris was split into several universities. The former Law School library became an inter-university library. In 1978, the library took the name of Cujas Library. Since 1979, Cujas Library has been operating under the supervision of Panthéon-Assas University and Pantheon-Sorbonne University.

== Privileges ==
Access to the library is mainly for scholars, Panthéon-Assas University and Panthéon-Sorbonne University 3rd-year undergraduates and postgraduates, and other universities' students (LLM and PhD students), and people with special interests in law, economics, and political sciences.

== Collections ==
The library is specialized in law, since it has been and still is a major reference and research library in legal studies. But Economics and Political Sciences are also targeted for acquisitions.

The library holds 750,000 items, including all Panthéon-Sorbonne University and Panthéon-Assas University legal dissertations and some doctoral dissertations from other universities. It is also a European Documentation Centre and has official documents by the United Nations and its committees from 1948 to 2010. Documents from the League of Nations, from the International Labour Organization and from the International Labour Office (journals) are also present.

There is a significant rare book collection and reading room (French: salle du patrimoine) whose items have been acquired over the years. Cujas Library has a partnership with the French National Library (French: Bibliothèque nationale de France), as far as projects in the field of Law are concerned, especially in preservation and digitization.

== See also ==
- List of libraries in France
