= Sorbonne Library =

University library in Paris, France

Coordinates: 48°50′41″N 2°20′33″E

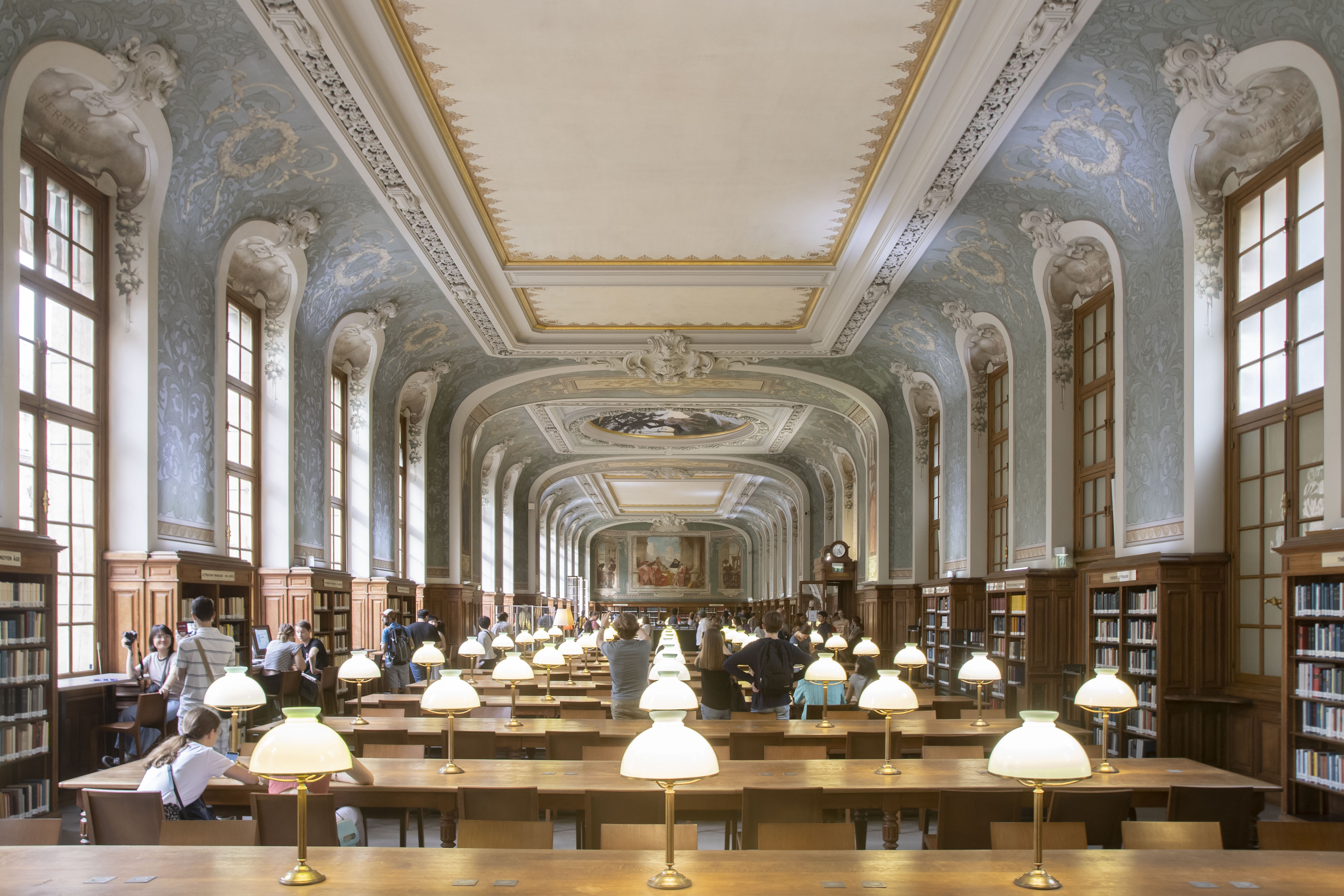
- View of the Jacqueline-de-Romilly reading room
- Location: 47, rue des Écoles, Latin Quarter, 5th arrondissement of Paris
- Type: Academic library of Panthéon-Sorbonne University
- Established: 1289

Collection
- Items collected: 8 à 14 000 new titles each year; 68% in foreign languages (English, German, Spanish, Italian, Portuguese, etc.), 20 000 titles; 3 889 current subscriptions. Special collections section : 187 000 items; 100 000 volumes prior to 1801; 3600 manuscripts; 565 incunabula; 7000 prints and photographs
- Size: 2 millions printed volumes. 35 000 lm

Other information
- Budget: 3,500 000 €
- Website: www.bis-sorbonne.fr/biu/spip.php?article191

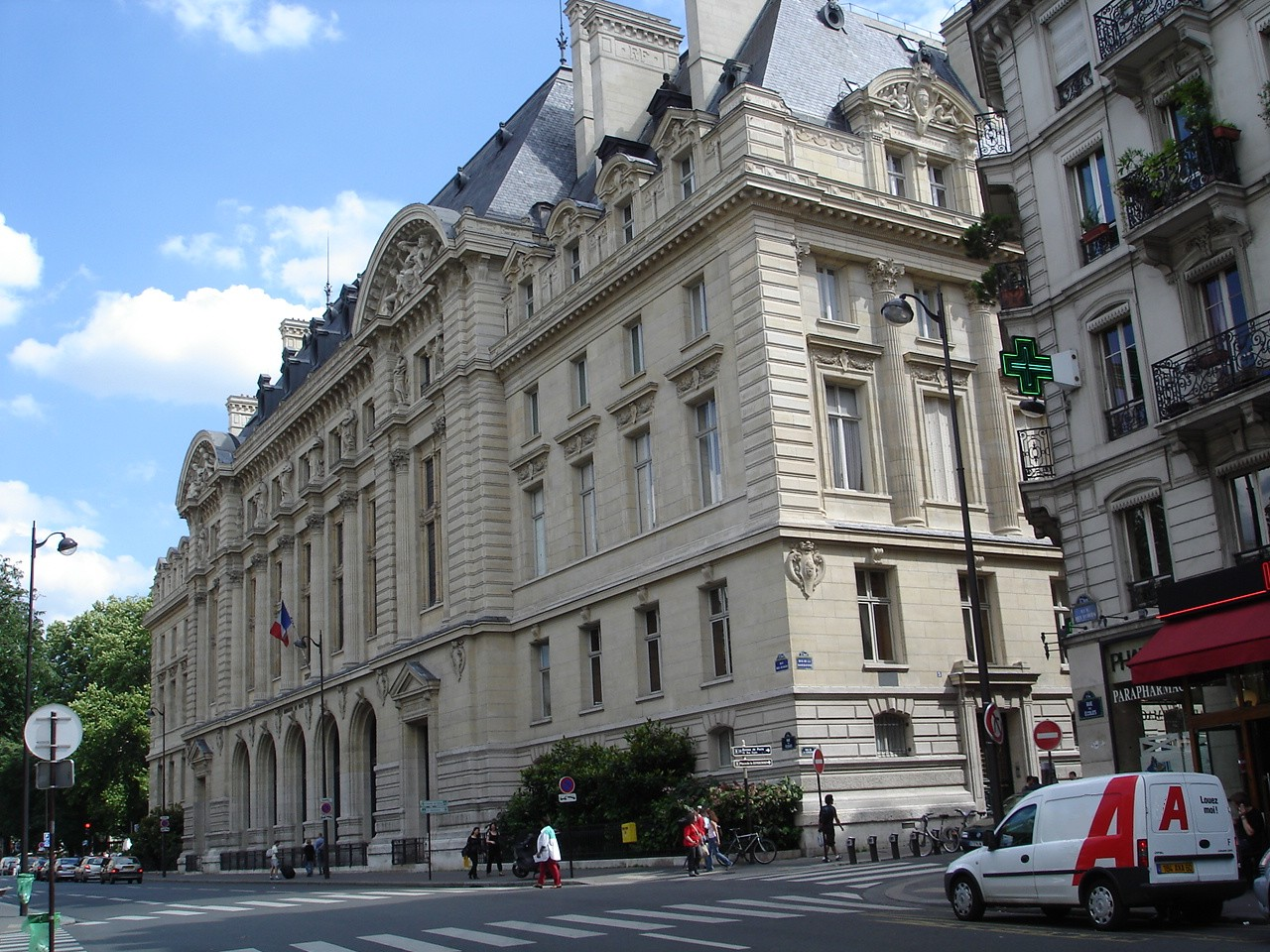
View of the Sorbonne, rue des Écoles

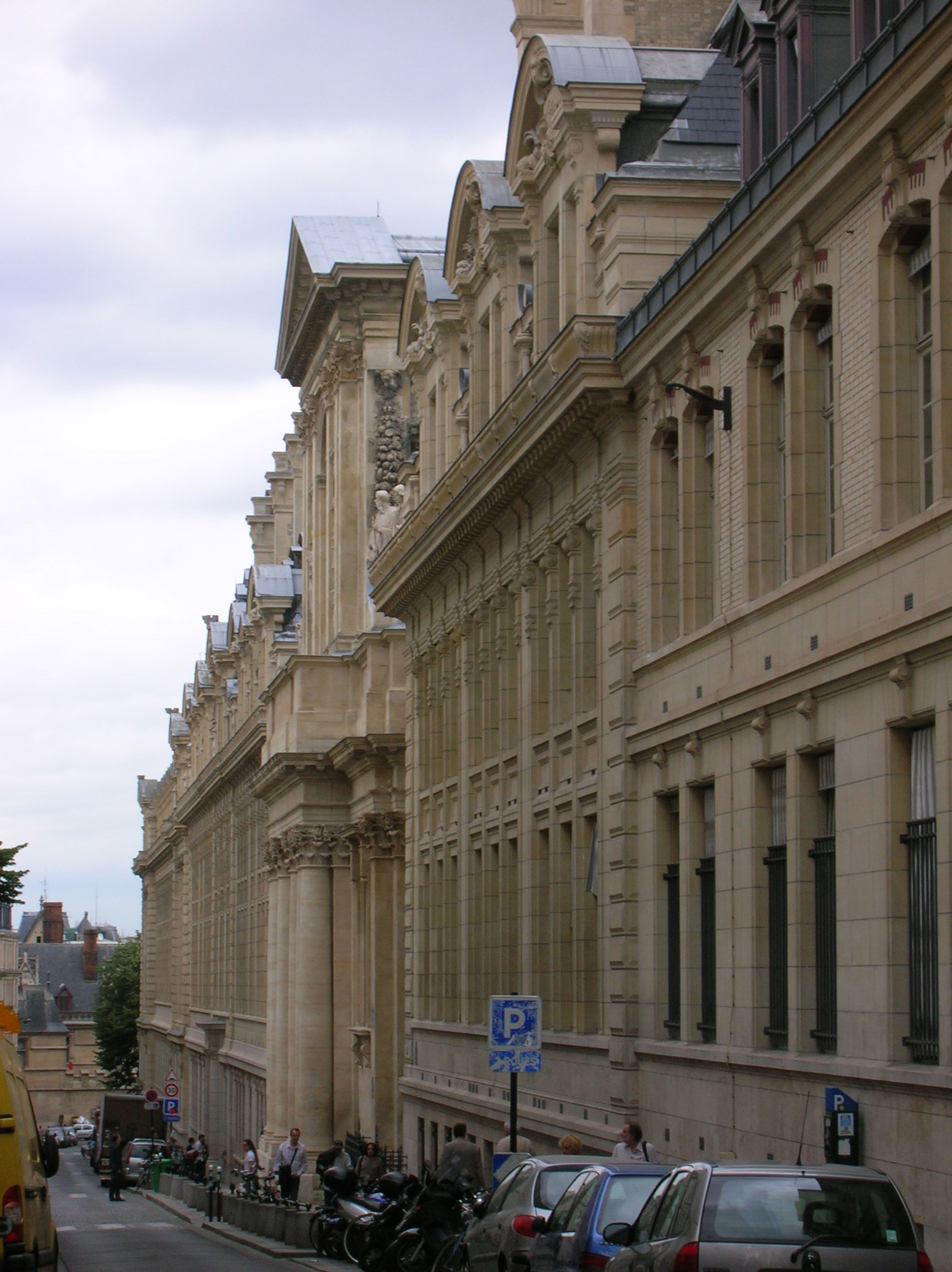
View of the Sorbonne, rue Victor-Cousin

The Sorbonne Library (French: Bibliothèque interuniversitaire de la Sorbonne) is an inter-university library part of the network of 36 libraries of the Panthéon-Sorbonne University, in Paris, France. It is located at 47, rue des Écoles in the Latin Quarter in the 5th arrondissement. The library of the Institute of Geography, located at 191 rue Saint-Jacques, is attached.

The Sorbonne Library is situated in the Sorbonne building. It is a medieval institution of the Sorbonne, which evolved over the centuries as part of the University of Paris. It is a common library of Panthéon-Sorbonne University and Sorbonne Nouvelle University. It is administered by Panthéon-Sorbonne University as per a governing agreement signed among these universities in 2020.

== History ==
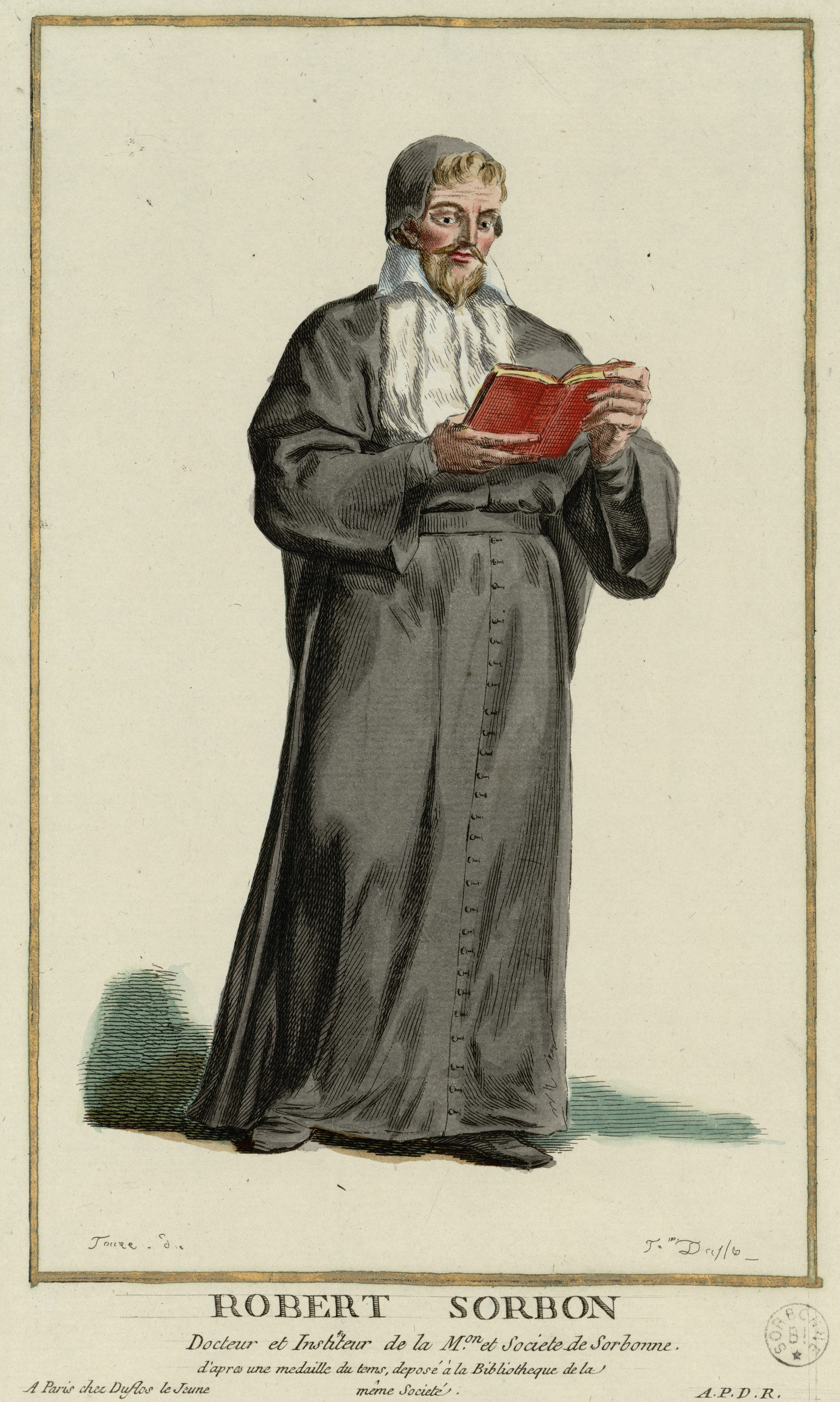
Robert de Sorbon

Library of the Ancient College de Sorbonne (1289–1795)

The college of theology, Maison de Sorbonne, was established at the Collège de Sorbonne in 1257 by Robert de Sorbon. Its library, the Library of the Collège de Sorbonne was founded in 1289. In the 1700s, the Jesuits, before leaving the Sorbonne, gave away their buildings and books to the University of Paris. In 1791, during the French Revolution, the library disbanded, and the books (of which there were 25,000 volumes on the eve of the Revolution) were distributed to other libraries. After the Revolution, the Sorbonne was rebuilt at the location of the medieval buildings. In the late 1800s, after the Napoleonic era, the library of the university started functioning from the Bibliothèque de la Sorbonne.

Library of the University of Paris (1770–present)

In 1770, almost five centuries after the Library of the Collège de Sorbonne was founded, the Library of the University of Paris was established. At the time, it was situated on the campus of the Lycée Louis-le-Grand. The initial fonds were acquired from the library of the rector and Cartesian philosophy professor, Jean-Gabriel Petit de Montempuis, collections of the college library, and others from 28 Parisian colleges, supplemented by purchases. The Lycée Louis-le-Grand closed in 1793 and the library materials were moved to a dépôt littéraire named "Louis la Culture" at the Saint-Paul-Saint-Louis Church. Some manuscripts were taken to the Bibliothèque nationale de France, but the dépôt was enriched with other materials, including those confiscated from the Princes of Condé, the House of Rougé, and House of Montmorency. In 1796, it was decided to move the books from the "Louis la Culture". With the creation of schools in 1802, the library was renamed the "Paris School Library" In 1808, it was renamed the "Library of the University of France".

During the period of 1816–1821, the faculties of theology, sciences and literature merged, adding their libraries to the Sorbonne Library. In 1823, the library moved across the rue Saint-Jacques to settle in the current building, constructed in the seventeenth century. Philippe Le Bas was head librarian from 1844 until 1860. He was noted for significant acquisitions, reorganization of collections, and the creation of five divisions. The library was deeded to the city of Paris in 1857, and five years later, the library used the name "University Library of France". Leon Renier, who succeeded Le Bas as head librarian (1860–1885), continued with Le Bas' policies.

Henri Paul Nénot designed the "new Sorbonne" which was built from 1885 to 1901, though its collections moved there in 1897; it provided seating for 300. By a decree of 28 June 1910, the Sorbonne Library became attached to the "Library of the University of Paris". From 1930 to 1970, the Sorbonne Library served as the head library of the University of Paris, and had a head librarian. In 1970, its modern scientific collections (since about 1945) were transferred to Saint-Victor (renamed Jussieu Campus), which formed the Interuniversity Scientific Library Jussieu (Bibliothèque interuniversitaire scientifique de Jussieu). In 1972, the Sorbonne Library merged with the Library of art and archeology, the Bibliothèque Sainte-Geneviève, and the Library for sick students. But six years later, it separated, returning to the name, Sorbonne Library. Additions were the Library of the Institute of Geography and the Victor Cousin Library.

In September 2010, restoration work began at the Sorbonne, estimated to last until October or November 2013. Funded by the City of Paris, owner of the premises, the aim was to redevelop the library premises and improve security. This included the creation of a single storey hall with Richelieu and Sorbon galleries, as well as new reading rooms. The project forced the relocation of collections and the reopening of the library at the Bibliothèque Sainte-Barbe from May 2010 to May 2013 when the library collections were moving back to the Sorbonne building site. The Bibliothèque de la Sorbonne reopened in November 2013.

The Library is normally open six days a week: Monday, Tuesday, Wednesday, Friday 09.00 - 20.00 / Thursday 12.00 - 20.00 / Saturday 10.00 - 19.00

From July to September 15: Monday, Tuesday, Wednesday, Friday: 10.00 - 19.00 / Thursday: 12.00 - 19.00

== Architecture and fittings ==
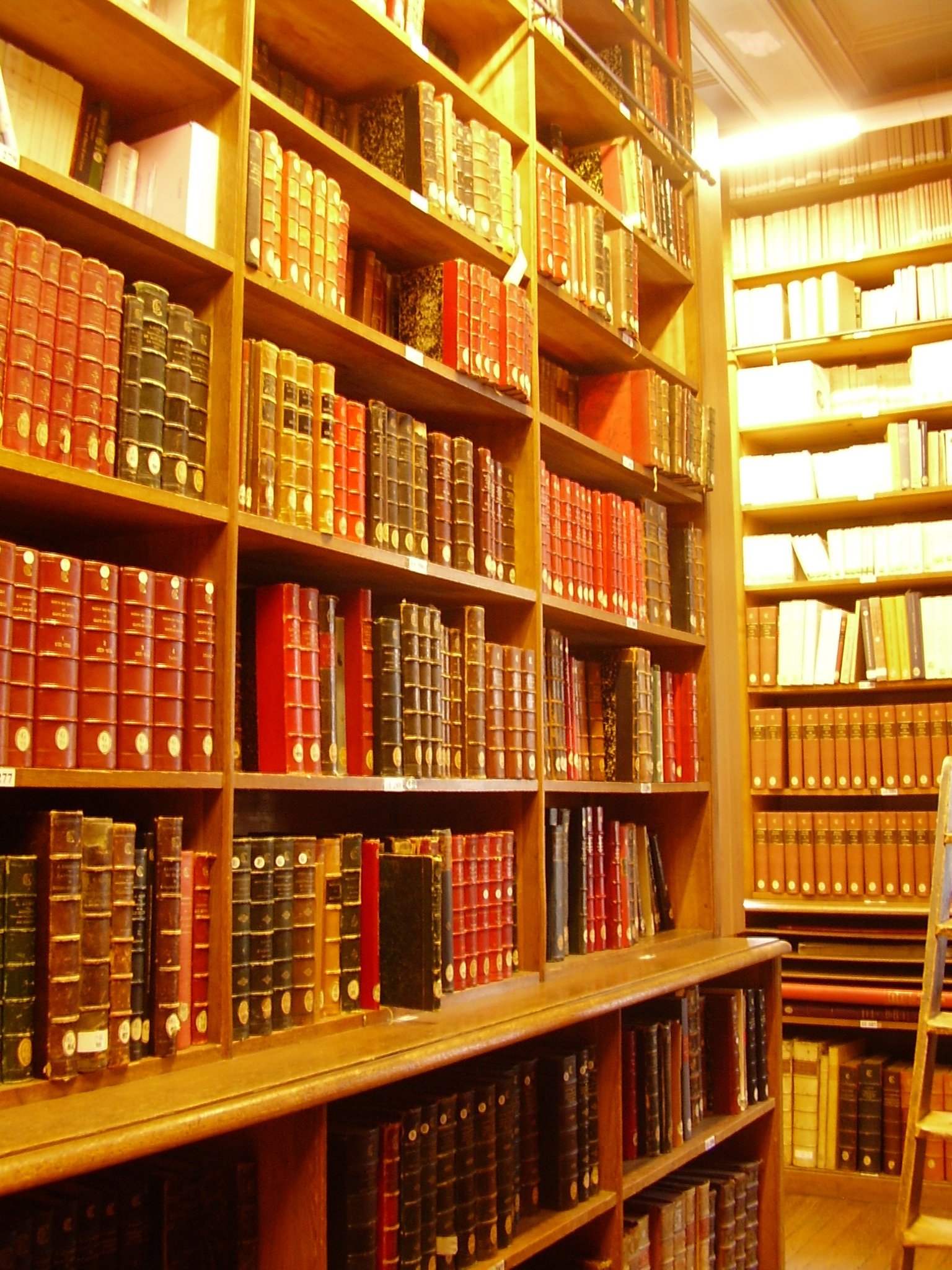
History room

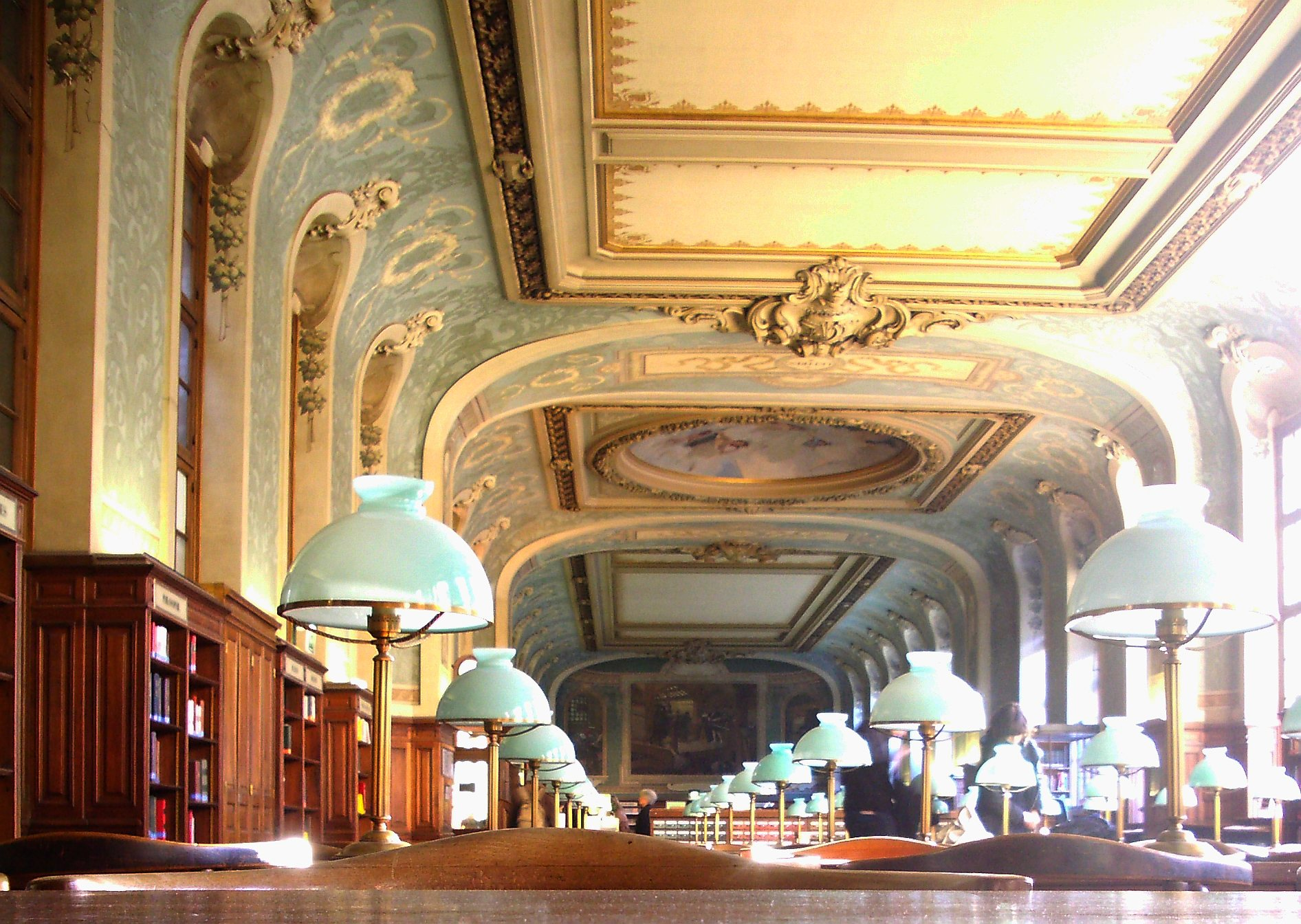
Saint-Jacques room

The library is situated at the Sorbonne building. It overlooks the courtyard, opposite the main entrance. The reading room is on the first floor of the main building. With a length of 62 metres (203 ft), it features five cross sections overlooking the courtyard. In the center are the librarians' offices and courtyard. There are 264 seats in the reading room. The library of Victor Cousin is on the second floor.

== Collections ==
The library consists of five sections:

- The Letters Section and Sciences Section are at the Sorbonne.
- The Medicine Section, located at the Faculty of Medicine, will be the new Interuniversity Library of Medicine.
- The Pharmacy Section, located at the Faculty of Pharmacy, will be in the new Interuniversity Library of Pharmacy.
- The Law Section, located within the Paris Law Faculty, is in the Cujas Library.

Within the general humanities and social sciences, the Sorbonne Library has however developed some areas of excellence: history (excluding contemporary history), geography, philosophy and French literature. In these areas, it has acquisitions in French and foreign languages. The library also acquired documents in religious sciences, and English language and literature, German, Spanish and Italian. It contains about three million volumes, with more than 18,000 printed theses and 15,000 on microfiche, 17,750 paper periodicals titles of which 4,370 still exist (among them a large majority in foreign languages), as well as a broad selection of electronic journals.

Sorbon left his volumes to the college collections. By 1289, there were over 1000 volumes, by the late 15th century, there were over 2,500 volumes, and in 1789, there were nearly 25,000 printed volumes plus over 2,000 manuscripts. Of its ancient or precious fonds, the library owns more than 2,500 manuscripts, as well as the archives of the former University of Paris, with more than 5,000 prints and more than 400,000 ancient books. The Victor Cousin Library includes nearly 500 manuscripts and 30,000 printed works. The Richelieu Collection includes the archives of the family of Richelieu, including Armand de Vignerot du Plessis, Duc de Richelieu and Armand-Emmanuel de Vignerot du Plessis, Duc de Richelieu.

By 1990, the library had almost a million volumes covering all departments of the university. By 2005, the number of books had increased to 2.5 million under 17,750 headings with 3,500 manuscripts. It has 7,100 graphics and pictures; every year an additional 1,000 to 12,000 volumes are added. The collection occupies 40 km (25 mi) of shelf space. It has two reading rooms with seating for 318 and has 13,780 registered members.

== See also ==
- List of libraries in France

== Bibliography ==
- Harris, Michael H. (29 July 1999). History of Libraries of the Western World. Scarecrow Press. ISBN 978-0-8108-7715-3.
- Rouse, Richard-H. 1967. “The Early Library of the Sorbonne.” Scriptorium, 42–71.
