= Jeannette Bougrab =

French lawyer and politician

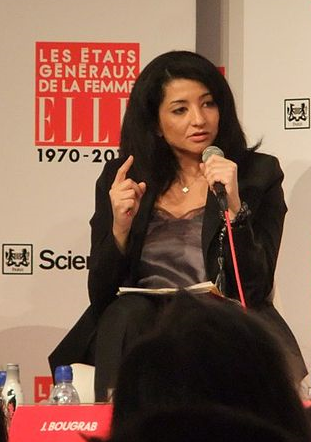
- Bougrab at the 2010 Convention of Women

Secretary of State for Youth Affairs
- In office 2010–2012
- President: Nicolas Sarkozy
- Prime Minister: François Fillon
- Preceded by: Marc-Philippe Daubresse
- Succeeded by: Valérie Fourneyron

Personal details
- Born: 26 August 1973 (age 53) Châteauroux, France
- Party: UMP
- Education: University of Orléans; Panthéon-Sorbonne University

Jeannette Bougrab (born 26 August 1973) is a French lawyer and politician of the UMP who served as the junior minister for Youth and Community Life in the government of Prime Minister François Fillon from 2010 to 2012. Prior to this, she was the Chair of the French Equal Opportunities and Anti-Discrimination Commission (HALDE) from 16 April 2010 to 14 November 2010.

== Early life ==
Jeannette Bougrab was born 26 August 1973 in Déols (Indre), to a Harki father. She received a Masters (DEA) in Law from the University of Orléans in 1997. In 2002 she completed a PhD in Public Law from the Sorbonne in Paris as well as a Masters (Magistère) in Economics Law.

== Career ==
Bougrab has been an associate Professor of Law at Institut d'Études Politiques de Paris and the Sorbonne. She also worked as a lawyer for the Constitutional Council of France.

Bougrab served on the board of directors of the Union pour un Mouvement Populaire (UMP) until 2007. She has been a member of the Haut Conseil à l'Intégration, the Administrative Board of the Arab World Institute (AWI) and the diversity oversight of the Conseil supérieur de l'audiovisuel (CSA). In 2010, she also became Chair of the Administrative Board of the Agence pour la Cohésion Sociale et l'Egalité (ACSE).

In 2015, Bougrab was appointed at the head of the Institut Français in Helsinki.

Ahead of the Republicans’ 2016 primaries, Bougrab endorsed Nicolas Sarkozy as the party’s candidate for 2017 presidential elections.

== Personal life ==
She is an atheist and a supporter of French secularism. She has claimed that she was the companion of cartoonist Charb, who was director of the Charlie Hebdo satirical journal and was killed in the Charlie Hebdo shooting in January 2015; however, Charb's family has strongly disputed this.

Bougrab has stated to the media, "I always knew he was going to die like Theo Van Gogh. I begged him to leave France but he wouldn’t." She has also said that Charb never had children because he knew he was going to die, that he defended secularism and the spirit of Voltaire. "I admired him before I fell in love with him and I loved him because of the way he was, because he was brave. He thought that life was a small thing unless he was defending his ideals," she said.

Charb's family, via a statement issued by his brother on 10 January 2015, denied the existence of any "interpersonal commitment" between Charb and Jeannette Bougrab. In response Jeanette Bougrab authorized the release of recent photographs of the couple together.
