= Sorbonne Faculty of Science and Engineering =

- Faculté des Sciences et Ingénierie de Sorbonne Université
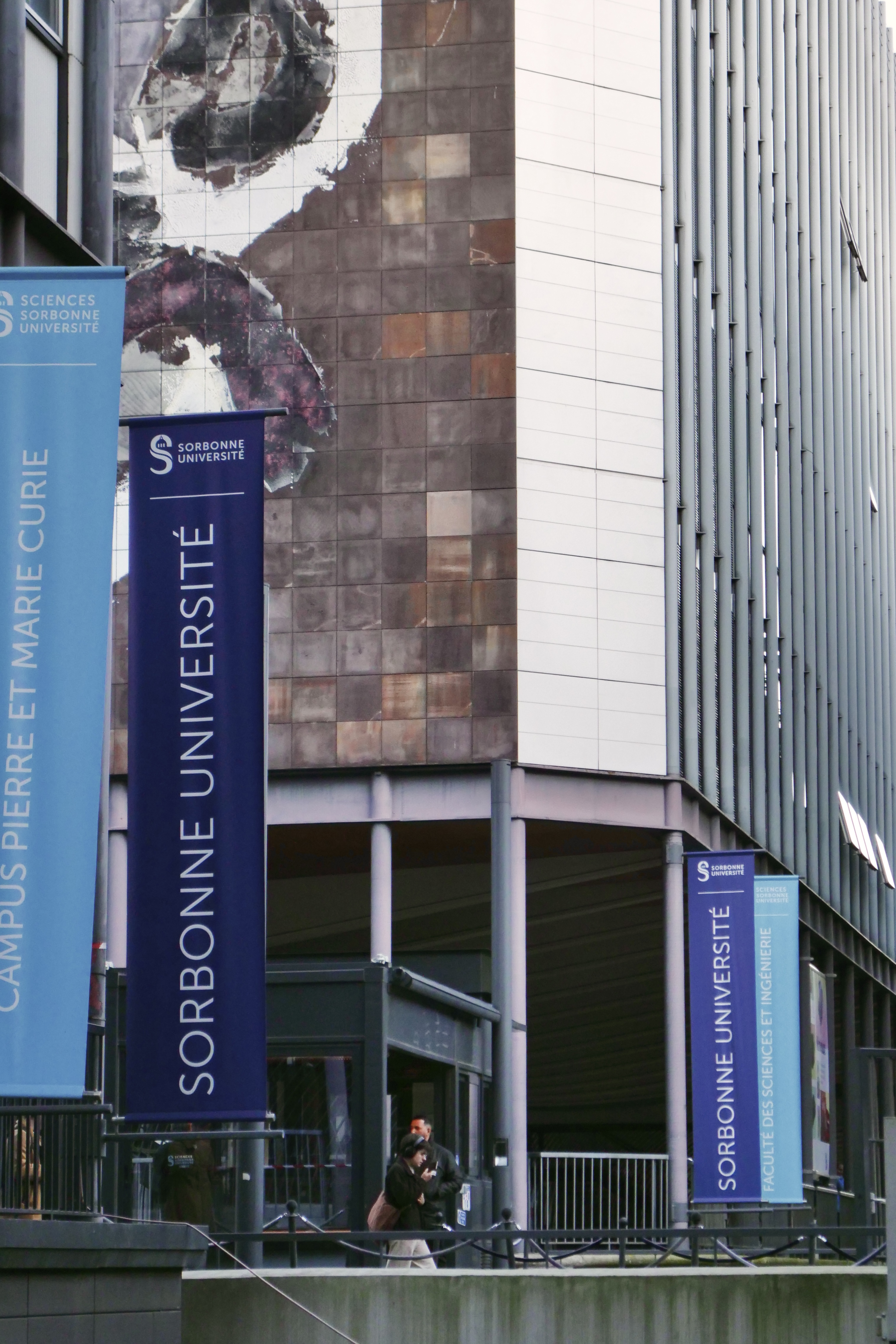
- The Jussieu campus, which hosts the faculty's head office.
- Former names: Faculty of Science of the University of Paris (1808–1970); Pierre and Marie Curie University, UPMC (1970–2017); Faculty of Science and Engineering of Sorbonne University (2017–)
- Type: Public
- Established: 1808; 218 years ago
- Parent institution: Sorbonne University
- Dean: Pr. Frédérique Peronnet
- Students: 22,000 (2,500 PhD)
- Location: Paris, Île-de-France, France
- Campus: 35 acres (14 ha); Urban
- Website: sciences.sorbonne-universite.fr/en

The Sorbonne Faculty of Science and Engineering (in French: Faculté des Sciences et Ingénierie de Sorbonne Université) is the second largest of Sorbonne University's three major faculties, in terms of the number of students enrolled. Formed in 1808 as the Faculty of Science of the University of Paris, it became an autonomous university between 1970 and 2017 under the name of the Pierre and Marie Curie University, before becoming a faculty again when it joined the new Sorbonne University. Marie Curie and Pierre Curie are considered the founders of the modern-day Faculty of Science and Engineering of Sorbonne University.

It has been located on the Jussieu Campus since 1956, in the 6th arrondissement of Paris, bordering the historic Latin Quarter to the west. It also has four satellite campuses in various regions of France: Roscoff in Brittany, Banyuls-sur-Mer in the Pyrenees and Villefranche-sur-Mer in the Alpes Maritimes.

Alongside the Faculty of Science of the Paris Cité University (9,000 students) and the Paris-Saclay Faculty of Sciences (10,000 students), it is one of the three inheritors of the former Faculty of Science of the University of Paris, with almost 22,000 students and one of the largest science schools in France and Europe.

The faculty's programs and research cover the fields of biology, earth, environmental and climate sciences, life sciences, physics, chemistry, mathematics, electronics, computer science, mechanics and engineering. In 2024, the faculty's departments rank the Sorbonne 4th worldwide in mathematics and oceanography, and 12th worldwide in earth sciences according to the Shanghai ranking.

== History ==
=== 19th century ===
The decree-law of 10 May 1806 created the Imperial University of France. In application of this law, the imperial decree of 17 March 1808 established the general organization of the Imperial University of France, within which the faculties had as their mission "advanced sciences and the conferring of degrees". It was specified that in Paris, the Faculty of Sciences would be formed by the union of two professors from the Collège de France, two from the Museum of Natural History, two from the École polytechnique, and two professors of mathematics from high schools, one of these professors being appointed dean.

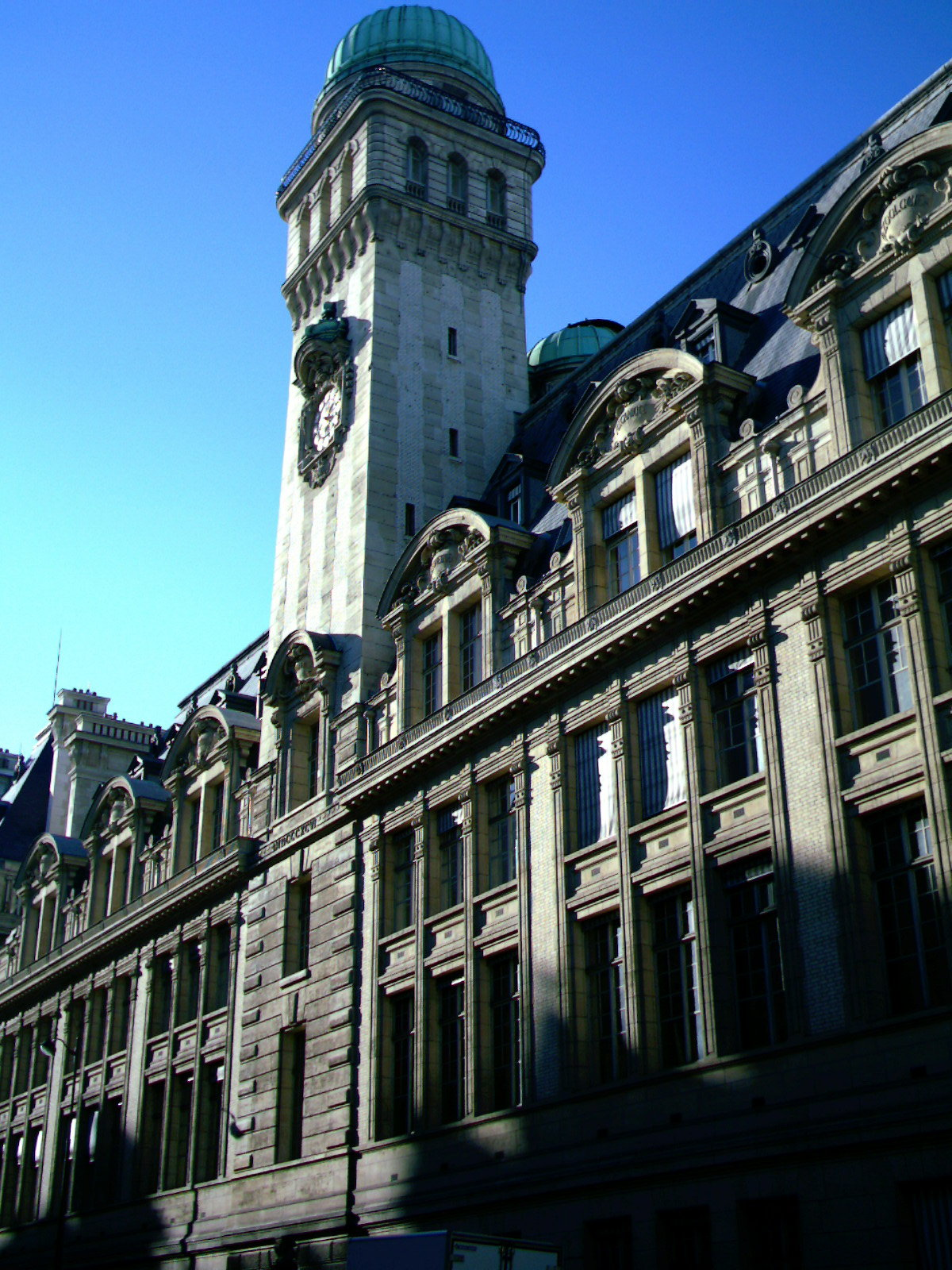
Tower of the astronomical observatory of the old buildings of the Faculty of Sciences on the Sorbonne campus

In 1855, under the Second French Empire, the French chemist Jean-Baptiste Dumas obtained the creation of the first laboratory of the faculty devoted to research, the laboratory of improvement and research for chemical studies, financed by the special budget of higher education. Thirty-two years previously, Jean-Baptiste Dumas, appointed chemistry tutor at the École polytechnique in 1824, had created a small personal laboratory there, the school no longer having research equipment. He maintained this laboratory at his own expense until the revolution of 1848 following which he occupied important political functions. In 1851, Henri Sainte-Claire Deville, appointed lecturer in chemistry at the École normale supérieure, was responsible for creating a research laboratory there. The laboratory for advanced training and research for chemical studies at the faculty was thus temporarily installed near Deville's laboratory before moving to premises on rue Saint-Jacques. It was intended in particular for graduates wishing to prepare for a doctorate. Alfred Riche, the faculty's chemistry preparer, was appointed head of chemical works at the laboratory. He was replaced by Paul Bérard, preparer at the laboratory, in 1862, then by Victor de Luynes in 1866.

Following the reconstruction of the Sorbonne, the Faculty of Science at the University of Paris was able to move into larger premises. But as the number of students and courses grew, the new premises themselves soon became too small. Multiple additional campuses were created in Paris, and even in France for some laboratories. Between 1809 and 1909, the number of professors increased more than sixfold. The faculty had 350 students in 1890, rising to 1990 twenty years later. Between 1825 and 1880, the budget increased from 73,041 francs to 485,260 francs.

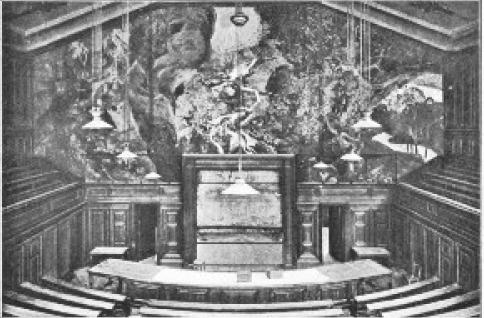
Chemistry amphitheater at the Sorbonne

In 1896, the various faculties of Paris, including the Faculty of Sciences, were grouped together within the University of Paris, while still retaining a very large degree of autonomy.

As early as 1941, there was talk of expanding the premises allocated to the Faculty of Science, and in 1946 it was decided to transfer it to the Halle aux Vins in Paris, within the future Jussieu Campus. In 1958, due to the overcrowding of teaching and the growing number of students in the Sorbonne premises and the delay in the transfer, it was decided to move part of the teaching of the Faculty of Science to Orsay, to a new satellite campus 20 kilometers south of Paris. In 1971, it became what is today the Paris-Saclay Faculty of Sciences.

=== 20th century ===
The Jussieu Campus is built on the site of what was once the Abbaye Saint-Victor, founded in 1113 by philosopher and theologian William of Champeaux. Closed in 1790 and destroyed in 1811, all that remains of the Abbey today are a few foundations still visible beneath the Esclangon building, used as a cellar when the Halle Aux Vins of Paris was set up there between 1813 and 1955. However, the abbey did not occupy all the grounds of the former abbey, since at no. 12 rue Cuvier were built the premises of the Faculty of Science of the University of Paris, opened in 1894, where Marie Curie carried out her research from 1906 to 1913.

The campus was inaugurated in 1959, but underwent continuous renovation until 2016. The Faculty of Science of the University of Paris, cramped in its old premises, needed to find conditions more suited to the demands of the post-war era. The campus is mainly made up of a "grid" of bars designed by architect Édouard Albert between 1964 and 1971, raised above a slab that in turn overhangs the surrounding streets. The grid features a central tower, the Zamansky Tower, and is flanked on two sides by older buildings of 65,000 m2, including two buildings (Cassan bars) erected by architect Urbain Cassan between 1958 and 1961, overlooking the Quai Saint-Bernard and Rue Cuvier.

In 1971, following the Faure Law, the Faculty of Science of the University of Paris gave way to two new autonomous universities: Pierre et Marie Curie University, for its scientific part, and Diderot University (now Paris Cité University), the only interdisciplinary university integrating literary and scientific disciplines. The scientific library, the result of the transfer of recent science collections from the Sorbonne Library, was renamed the Jussieu Scientific Library.

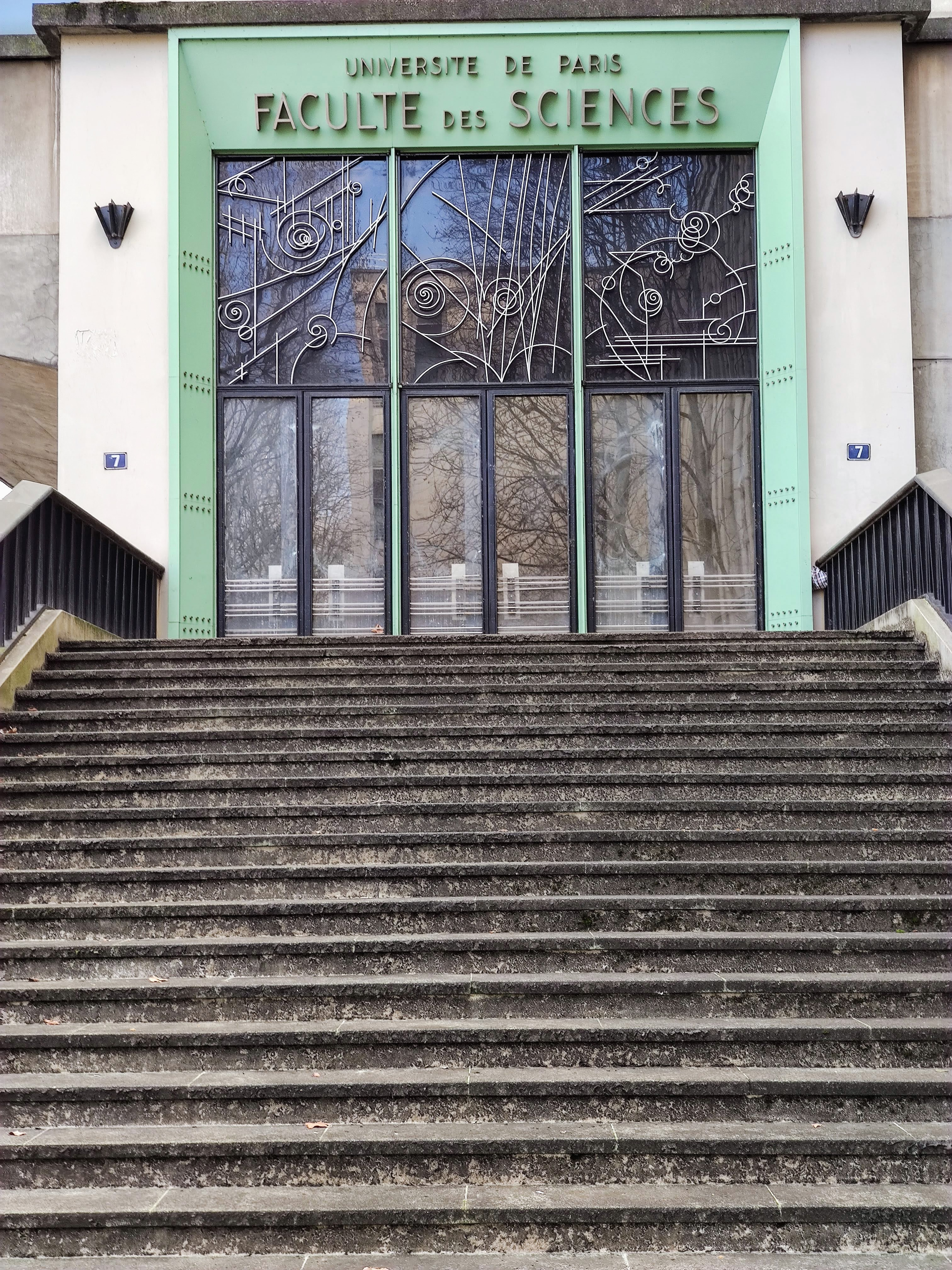
Former faculty entrance dating from 1956, on the Seine side.

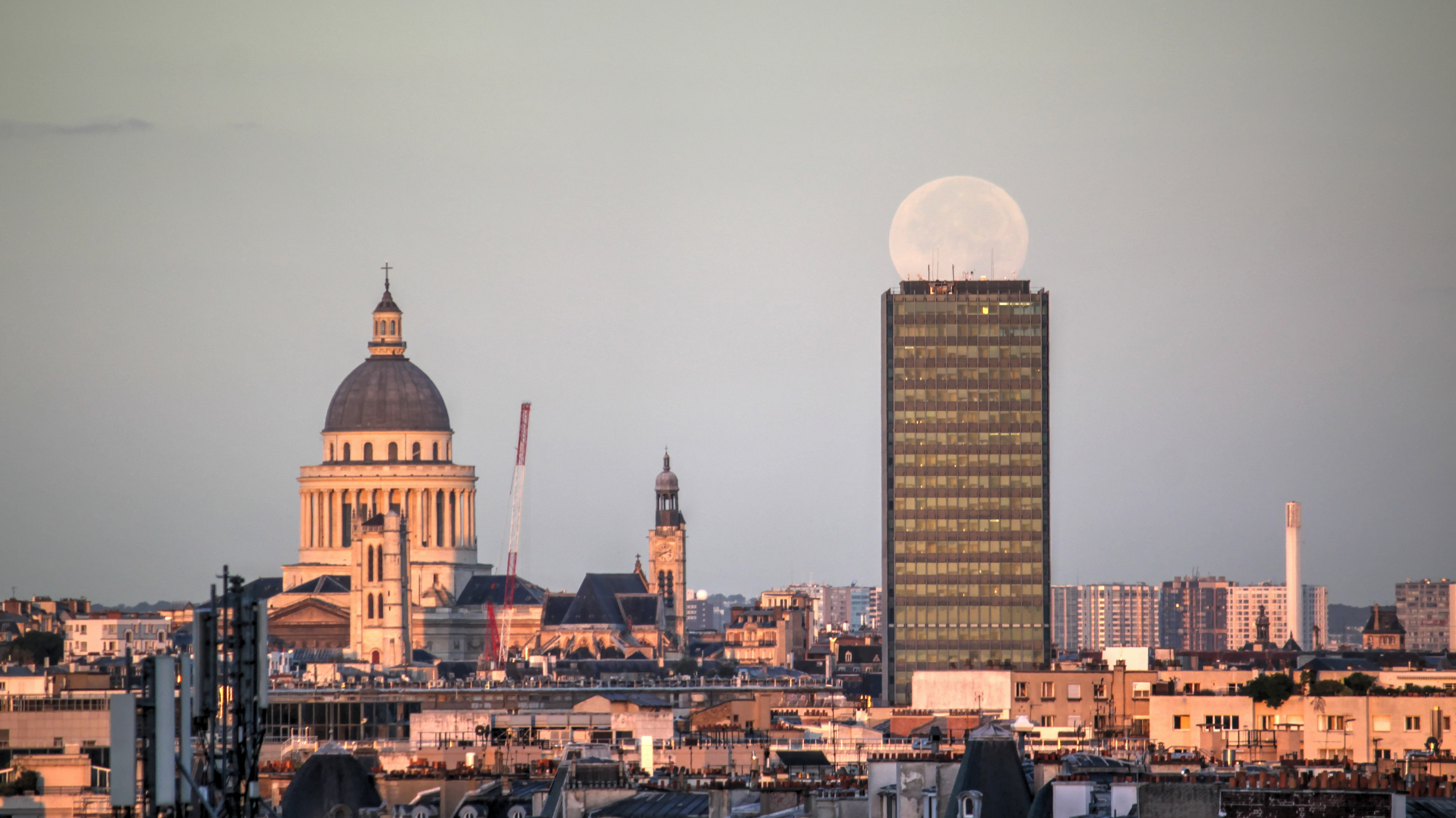
The Tour Zamansky, in 2017.

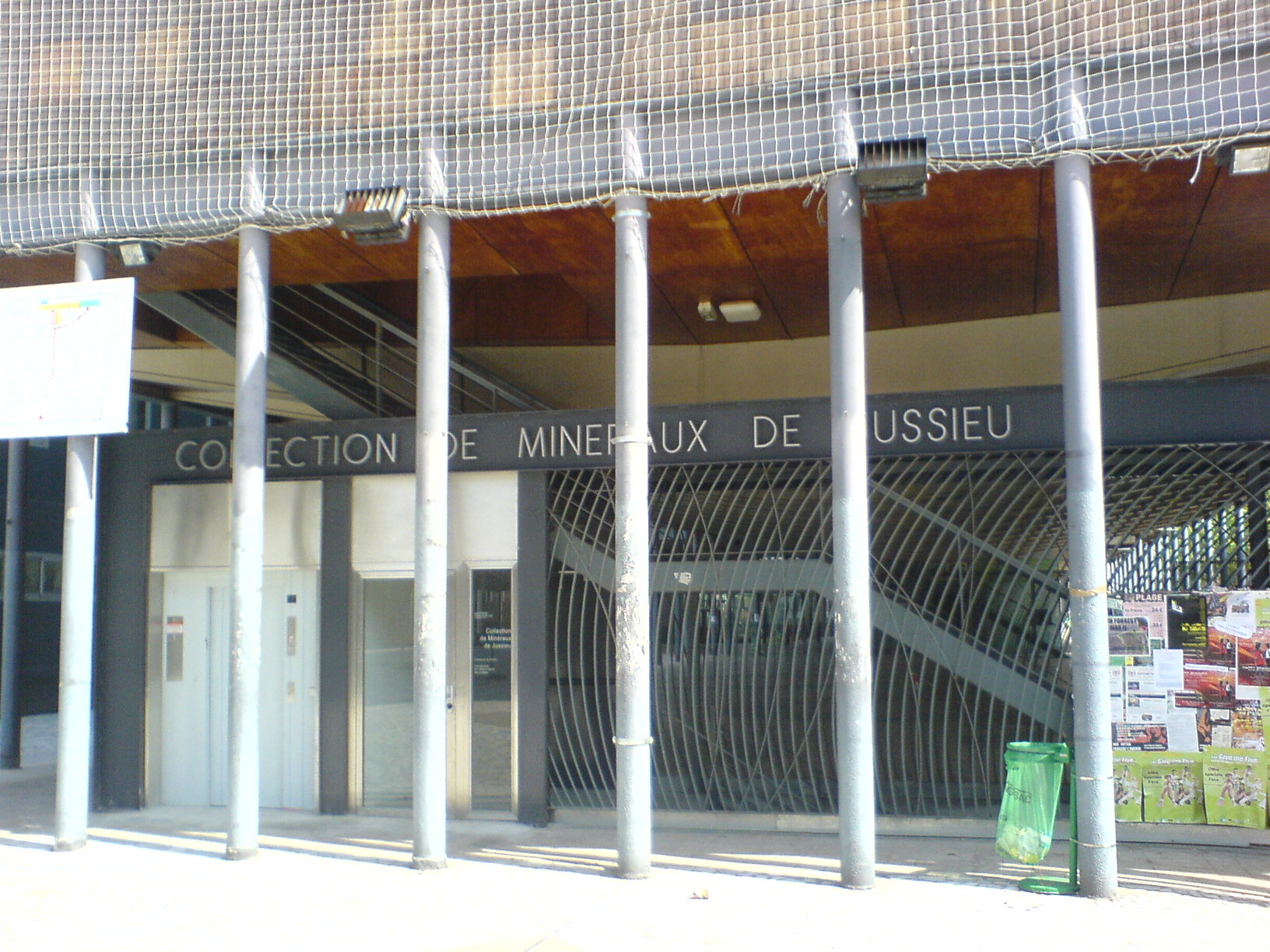
Entrance of the Jussieu Mineral Collection, at the Sorbonne Faculty of Science and Engineering, in 2006.

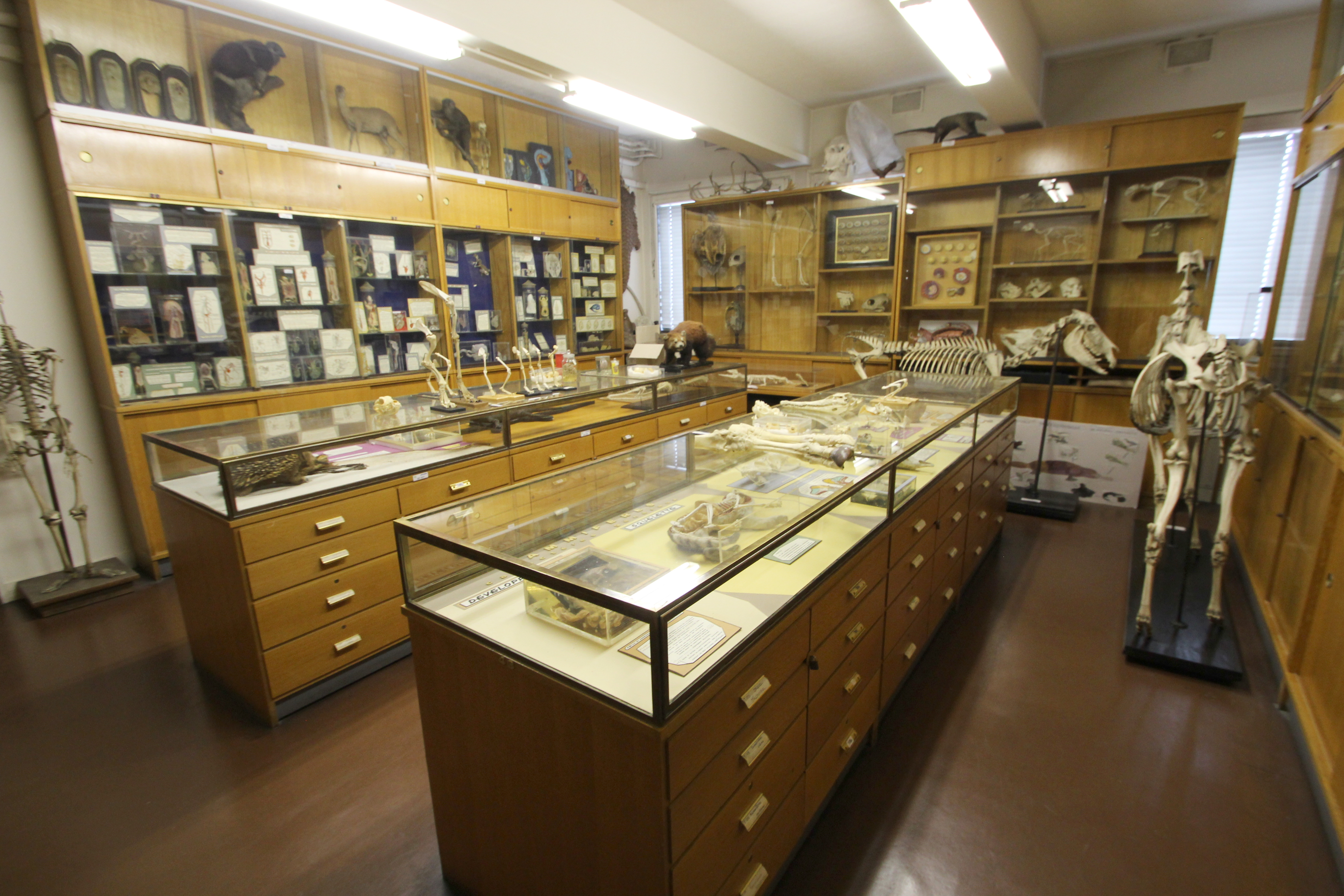
The Sorbonne's Zoology Collection, April 2016.

== Organization ==
Sorbonne Faculty of Science and Engineering consists of the following divisions:

- Sorbonne University Polytechnic School
- the Henri Poincaré Institute
- the Paris Institute of Astrophysics
- the Paris Institute of Statistics (ISUP)
- Roscoff Biological Station (SBR)
- Villefranche Marine Station
- Banyuls Oceanological Observatory
- the Institute of Computing and Data Sciences (ISCD)
- the Institute of Health Engineering (IUIS)
- Sorbonne Institute for Environmental Transition
- Sorbonne Center for Artificial Intelligence (SCAI)
- and the Sorbonne University Library's Sciences department (former Jussieu Scientific Library)

It has 79 laboratories in the Paris region, most in association with the Centre national de la recherche scientifique (CNRS). Some of the most notable institutes and laboratories include the Institut Henri Poincaré (Mathematics), Institut d'astrophysique de Paris (Astrophysics), LIP6 (Informatics / Computer Science), Institut des systèmes intelligents et de robotique (Robotics), Institut de mathématiques de Jussieu – Paris Rive Gauche (foundations of Mathematics, shared with University of Paris Cité) and the Laboratoire Kastler-Brossel (Quantum Physics, shared with PSL University).

The Faculty also hosts the European headquarters of the European Marine Biological Resource Centre (EMBRC), which is Europe's ‘research infrastructure’ for marine biological resources, bringing together 14 marine biology stations in 9 European countries.

== See also ==
=== Bibliography ===
- La gestion de leur patrimoine immobilier par les universités, condition d'une autonomie assumée (in French). (Rapport annuel de la Cour des comptes de 2009, partie 1 sur les observations des jurisdictions financières)
- Le campus de Jussieu : les dérives d'une réhabilitation mal conduite (in French). November 2011. (Rapport public thématique de la Cour des comptes)
- Du désamiantage à la rénovation du campus de Jussieu (in French). (Rapport annuel de la Cour des comptes de 2005)
- Le chantier de Jussieu et la conduite des grandes opérations immobilières des universités franciliennes : des enseignements à tirer (in French). (Rapport annuel de la Cour des comptes de 2015, tome 2 sur les suites données aux recommendations formulées antérieurement).
- Dupont, Jean-Léonce (18 March 2003). Voyage au bout… de l'immobilier universitaire (in French). (Rapport d’information du Sénat)
- (Rapport d’information du Sénat)

=== External links ===
- Official website
