= Sorbonne University =

Public university in Paris, France

Coordinates: 48°51′4″N 2°20′26″E

- Motto: Créateurs de futurs depuis 1257 (French)
- Motto in English: Creators of futures since 1257
- Type: Public research non-profit coeducational higher education institution
- Established: 1257; 769 years ago (as Sorbonne College); 1808; 218 years ago (as a faculty); 2010; 16 years ago (as a university system); 2018; 8 years ago (current legal status)
- Academic affiliations: Chancellery of the Universities of Paris; Udice Group; EUA; 4EU+ Alliance; LERU; UNICA; TPC
- Endowment: €900 million
- Budget: €1 billion (2021)
- President: Nathalie Drach-Temam
- Faculty: 6,400
- Administrative staff: 3,600
- Students: 55,600 (2019)
- Location: 21 Rue de l'École de Médecine 75006 Paris, France
- Campus: Latin Quarter; Clignancourt; Jussieu; Institut de Géographie; Malesherbes
- World Ranking: 35 (ARWU)
- Colors: Blue and Red
- Nickname: Sorbonne
- Website: sorbonne-universite.fr

Sorbonne University (French: Sorbonne Université) is a public research university in Paris, France. The institution's legacy reaches back to the Middle Ages in 1257 when the College of Sorbonne was established by Robert de Sorbon as a constituent college of the University of Paris, one of the first universities in Europe. Its current iteration was formed in 2018 by the merger of Paris-Sorbonne University (Paris IV) and the Université Pierre et Marie Curie (Paris VI).

Sorbonne University is one of the most sought after universities by students and researchers from France, Europe, and the French speaking countries. Most notably, Marie Skłodowska-Curie, who came from Poland in 1891 and joined the Faculty of Sciences of the University of Paris, was also the first woman to become a professor at the Sorbonne. Marie Skłodowska-Curie and her husband Pierre Curie are considered the founders of the modern-day Faculty of Science and Engineering of Sorbonne University. As of 2021, Sorbonne University claimed that its alumni and professors have won 33 Nobel Prizes, six Fields Medals, and one Turing Award.

== History ==
=== College of Sorbonne ===
Robert de Sorbon (1201–1274), chaplain to King Louis IX (Saint Louis), observed the difficulties experienced by poor "schoolchildren" in achieving the rank of doctor. In February 1257, he had a house (domus) officially established which he intended for a certain number of secular clergy who, living in common and without concern for their material existence, would be entirely occupied with study and teaching. This house was named the college of Sorbonne.

The old slogan of the establishment, "Sorbonne University, creators of futures since 1257", refers to this date. The college of Sorbonne was closed along with all the other colleges of the former University of Paris in 1793.

The college of Sorbonne was located on the site of the current Sorbonne building, shared between Sorbonne University and Panthéon-Sorbonne University.

=== Faculty of Humanities of Paris, "the Sorbonne" ===
Based at the Sorbonne, the University of Paris Faculty of Humanities (commonly known as the Sorbonne because of its location) was created by the decree of 17 March 1808 on the organisation of the Imperial University of France.

Under the Bourbon Restoration, the faculty welcomed an average of 1,000 to 1,500 students a year, rising to 2,000 under the July Monarchy. But the number of teaching staff remained limited: between 1809 and 1878, only 51 professors taught at the Faculty of Humanities.

Following the promulgation of laws on 28 April 1893, giving civil personality to the bodies formed by the union of several faculties of an academy, and 10 July 1896, giving the name of university to the bodies of faculties, the new University of Paris was created in 1896 through the merger of the Faculty of Science, the Faculty of Humanities, the Faculty of Law, the Faculty of Medicine, the Faculty of Protestant Theology (created in 1877 and transformed into a free faculty in 1905), and the École supérieure de pharmacie. It was inaugurated on 19 November 1896 by its president, Félix Faure.

=== Faculty of Sciences of Paris ===
The Faculty of Sciences in Paris was opened in 1811 following the creation of the Imperial University of France, and was housed in the Collège du Plessis, in the Latin Quarter of Paris.

In 1826, the faculty moved to the Sorbonne. It remained there until 1962, when it moved to the Jussieu Campus. The Jussieu campus is now the main site of the Sorbonne University Faculty of Science and Engineering. At the same time, in 1927 it opened a satellite campus at Orsay, in the south of Paris, which would later become the current Paris-Saclay University, as well as a satellite campus at Orléans in 1960.

=== Splitting of the University of Paris ===
In 1971, the University of Paris, including its humanities and science faculties, split into several interdisciplinary universities. Some, including the University of Paris-Sorbonne, retained the name "Sorbonne" and premises in the historic centre of the University of Paris, which had until then been mainly devoted to the faculties of Humanities and Sciences.

The University of Paris-VI, later renamed as "UPMC", is created from the majority of the teaching and research units of the Faculty of Sciences of Paris (the others joining the universities of Paris-VII Denis Diderot (now Université Paris Cité), Paris-Saclay University in Orsay, Paris-XII and Paris-XIII in Villetaneuse) and part of the units of the Faculty of Medicine of Paris (the others joining the universities of Paris-V René Descartes (now Université Paris Cité), Paris-VII Denis Diderot and Paris-XIII).

=== Reunification of the University of Paris-Sorbonne and UPMC ===
In 2010, some of the direct successors of the faculties of the University of Paris created the Sorbonne Universities Association. The following universities, members of the university system, decided to merge into Sorbonne University in 2018:

- Paris-Sorbonne University (Paris IV) (1971–2017), formerly a constituent part of the faculty of humanities of the University of Paris.
- Université Pierre et Marie Curie (UPMC or Paris VI) (1971–2017), formerly a constituent part of the faculty of sciences and of the school of medicine of the University of Paris.

At the same time, the Sorbonne Universities Association was renamed the Sorbonne University alliance; it includes the following institutions for academic cooperation:

- University of Technology of Compiègne (1972– )
- INSEAD
- National Museum of Natural History
- Centre international d'études pédagogiques (International Centre for Pedagogical Studies)
- Pôle supérieur d'enseignement artistique Paris Boulogne-Billancourt
- Four research institutes

As part of the reforms of French Higher Education, on 19 March 2018, the international jury called by the French Government for the "Initiative d'excellence" (IDEX) confirmed the definite win of Sorbonne University. Consequently, Sorbonne University won an endowment of €900 million with no limit of time. This is the first higher education institution in Paris region to win such an endowment. The university was established by a decree issued 21 April 2017, taking effect 1 January 2018.

== Faculties ==
Sorbonne University has three faculties: Arts and Humanities, Science and Engineering, and Health Sciences.

=== Arts and humanities ===
The Sorbonne University Faculty of Arts and Humanities provides studies in arts, languages, letters, and human and social sciences, and is the largest in France. Fields such as history, geography, languages, linguistics, musicology, philosophy, classical and modern literature, foreign literature and civilisations, and the history of art and archaeology are part of this faculty.

=== Science and engineering ===
The Sorbonne Faculty of Science and Engineering is a major research institution in France. It can be considered the successor in direct line to the Faculty of Science of the University of Paris with the Paris-Saclay Faculty of Sciences.

It has 79 laboratories in the Paris region, most in association with the Centre national de la recherche scientifique (CNRS). Some of the most notable institutes and laboratories include the Institut Henri Poincaré (Mathematics), Institut d'astrophysique de Paris (Astrophysics), LIP6 (Informatics / Computer Science), Institut des systèmes intelligents et de robotique (Robotics), Institut de mathématiques de Jussieu – Paris Rive Gauche (foundations of Mathematics, shared with University Paris Cité) and the Laboratoire Kastler-Brossel (Quantum Physics, shared with PSL University).

=== Health sciences ===
The Sorbonne University Faculty of Health Sciences, in association with the Greater Paris University Hospitals (AP-HP), manages the AP-HP Sorbonne University Hospital Group (Hôpital Charles-Foix, Pitié-Salpêtrière Hospital, Hôpital Fondation Rothschild, Hôpital Saint-Antoine, Hôpital Tenon, Hôpital Armand-Trousseau, Hôpital de La Roche-Guyon) and the Quinze-Vingts National Ophthalmology Hospital, promoting multidisciplinary research, and training doctors and other health professionals.

== Law (external tuition) ==
There is no law school as such in Sorbonne University. In 1971, most of the law professors from the Faculty of Law and Economics of the University of Paris decided to restructure it as a university, called Panthéon-Assas University Paris (after the two main campuses of the Paris Law Faculty: place du Panthéon and rue d'Assas campuses). Panthéon-Assas now provides legal studies for Sorbonne University as an independent university.

Another law school, the Panthéon-Sorbonne University School of Law (also a spin-off of the Faculty of Law and Economics of the University of Paris) also exists in Paris, but has no connection with Sorbonne University.

== Campuses ==
Sorbonne University Faculty of Arts & Humanities (yellow), Faculty of Science (cyan) and Faculty of Health Sciences (red) campuses within Paris
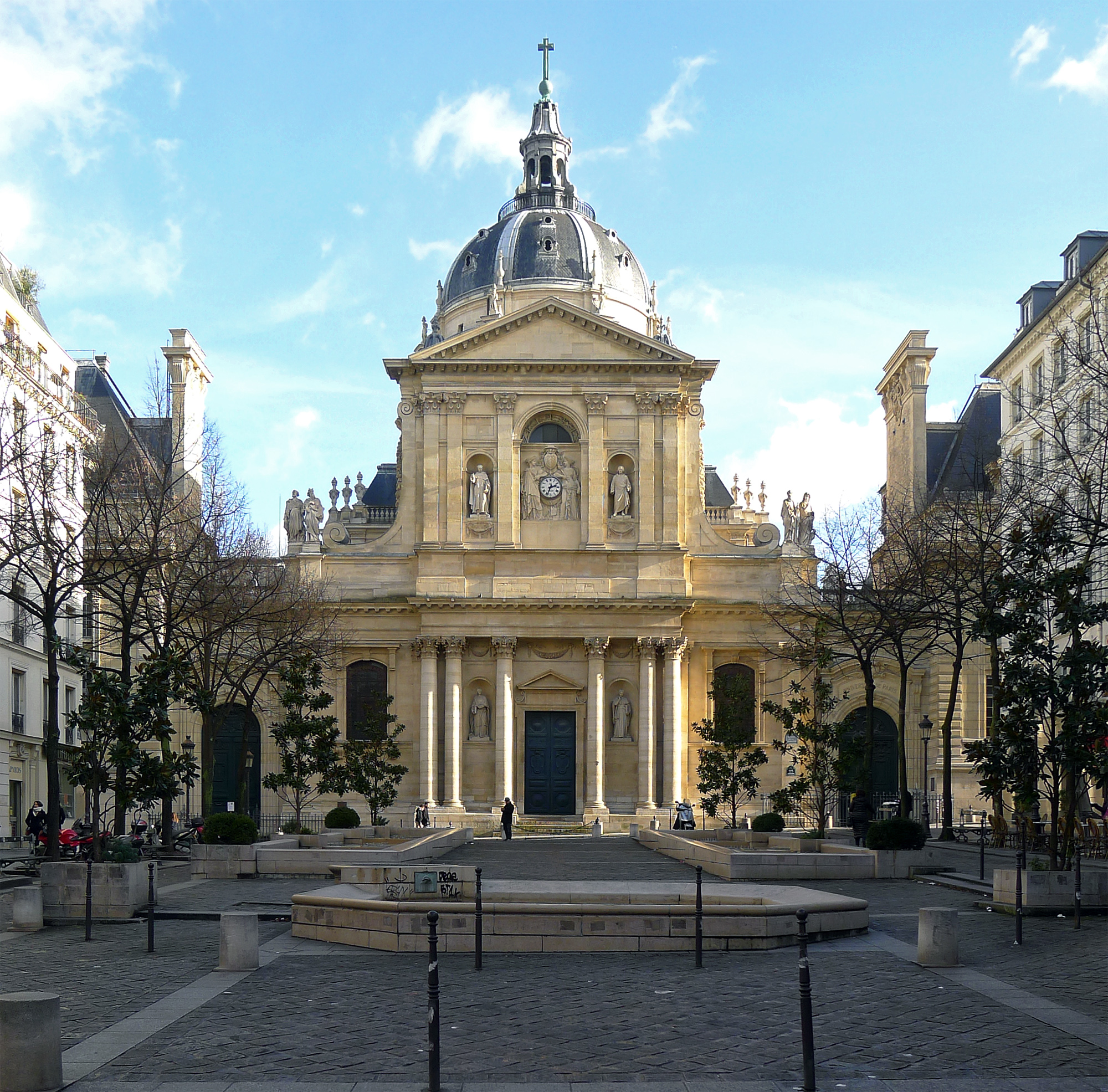
The Sorbonne, the university's historic main campus. It is home to the university's arts and humanities departments

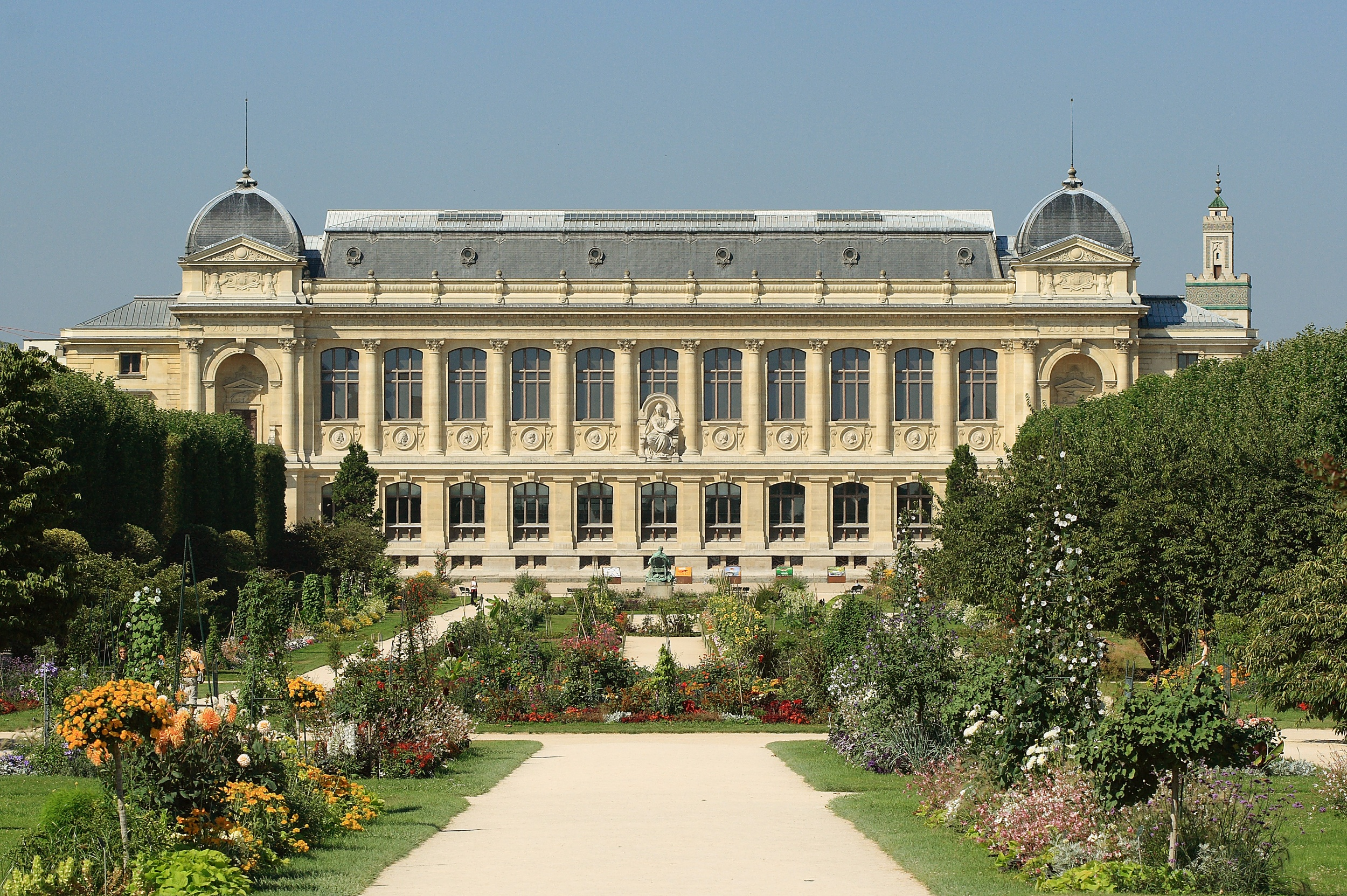
A view of the Jardin des plantes, the campus of Sorbonne University's Natural History Museum

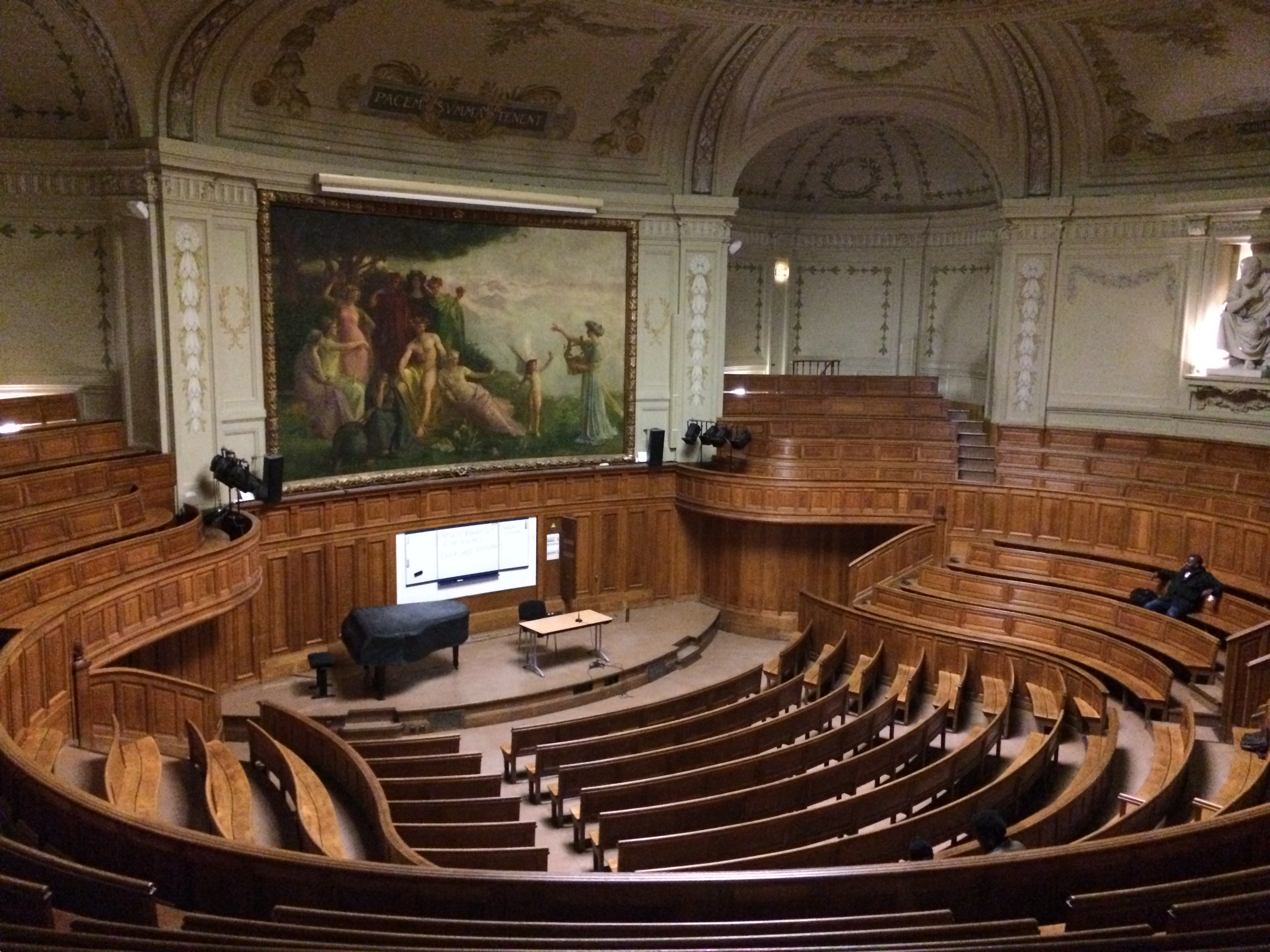
The "Amphithéâtre Richelieu", a lecture hall of Sorbonne University

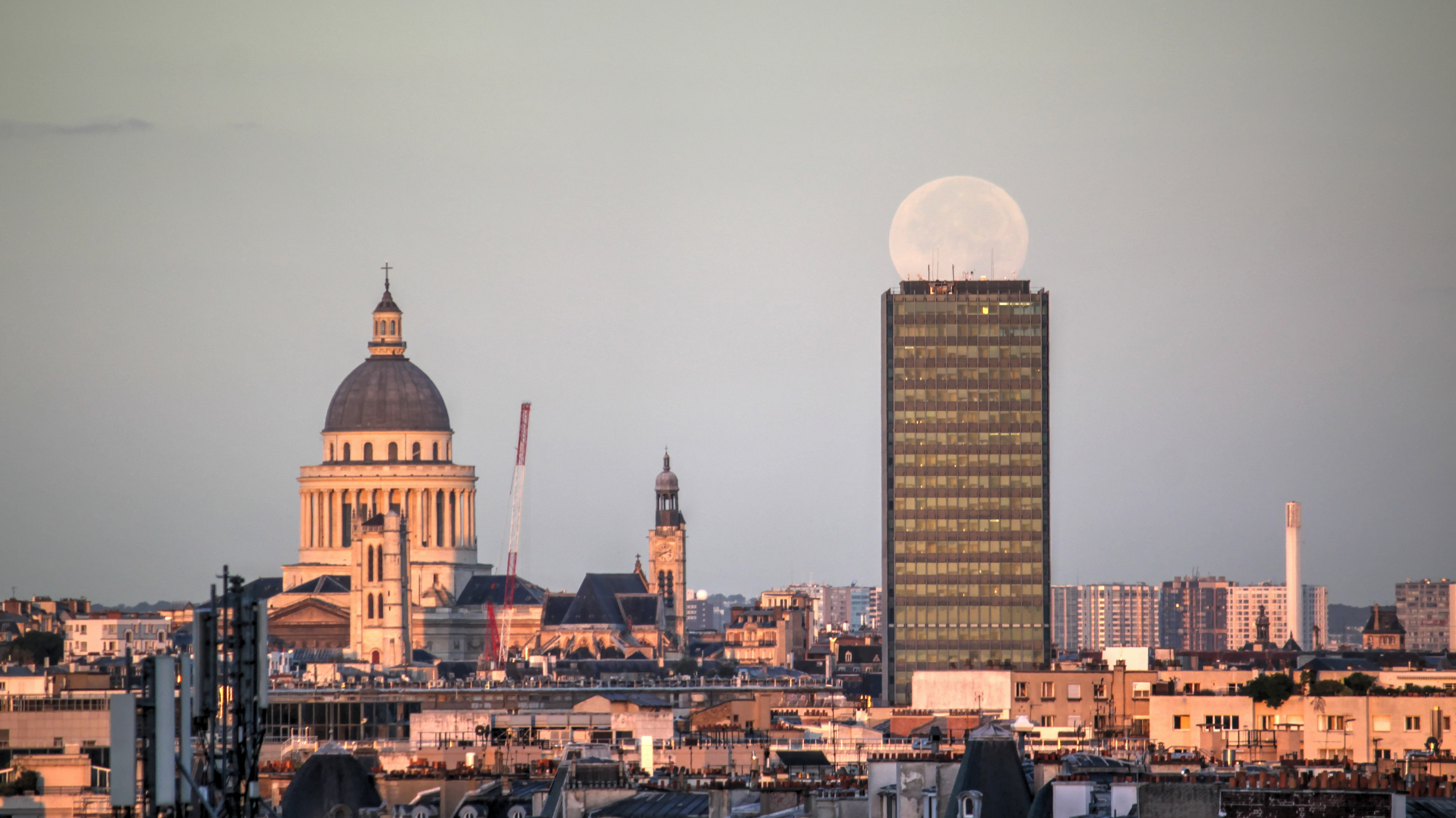
The Zamansky Tower, located at the heart of the Sorbonne Faculty of Science and Engineering campus

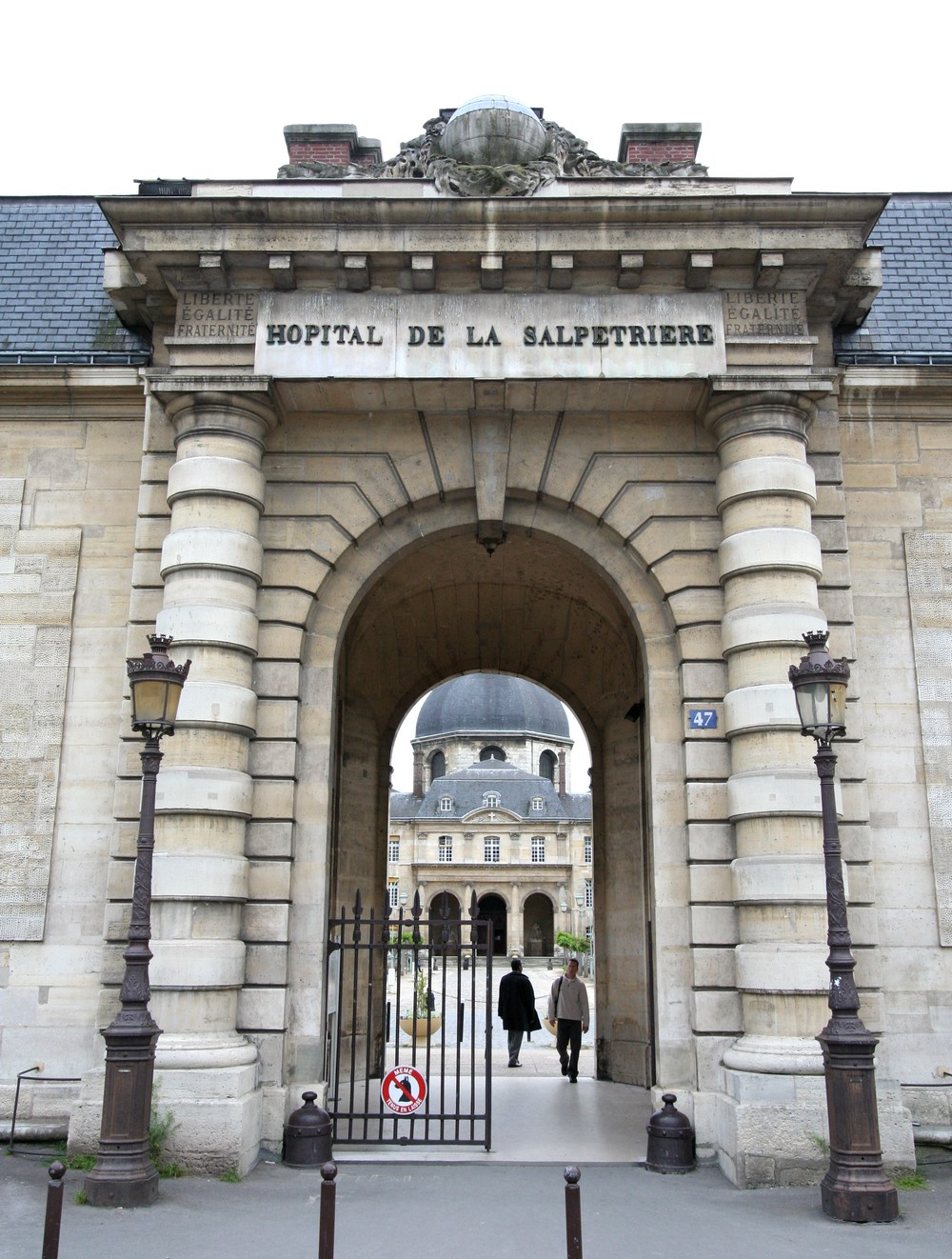
Entrance to the Pitié-Salpêtrière University Hospital campus

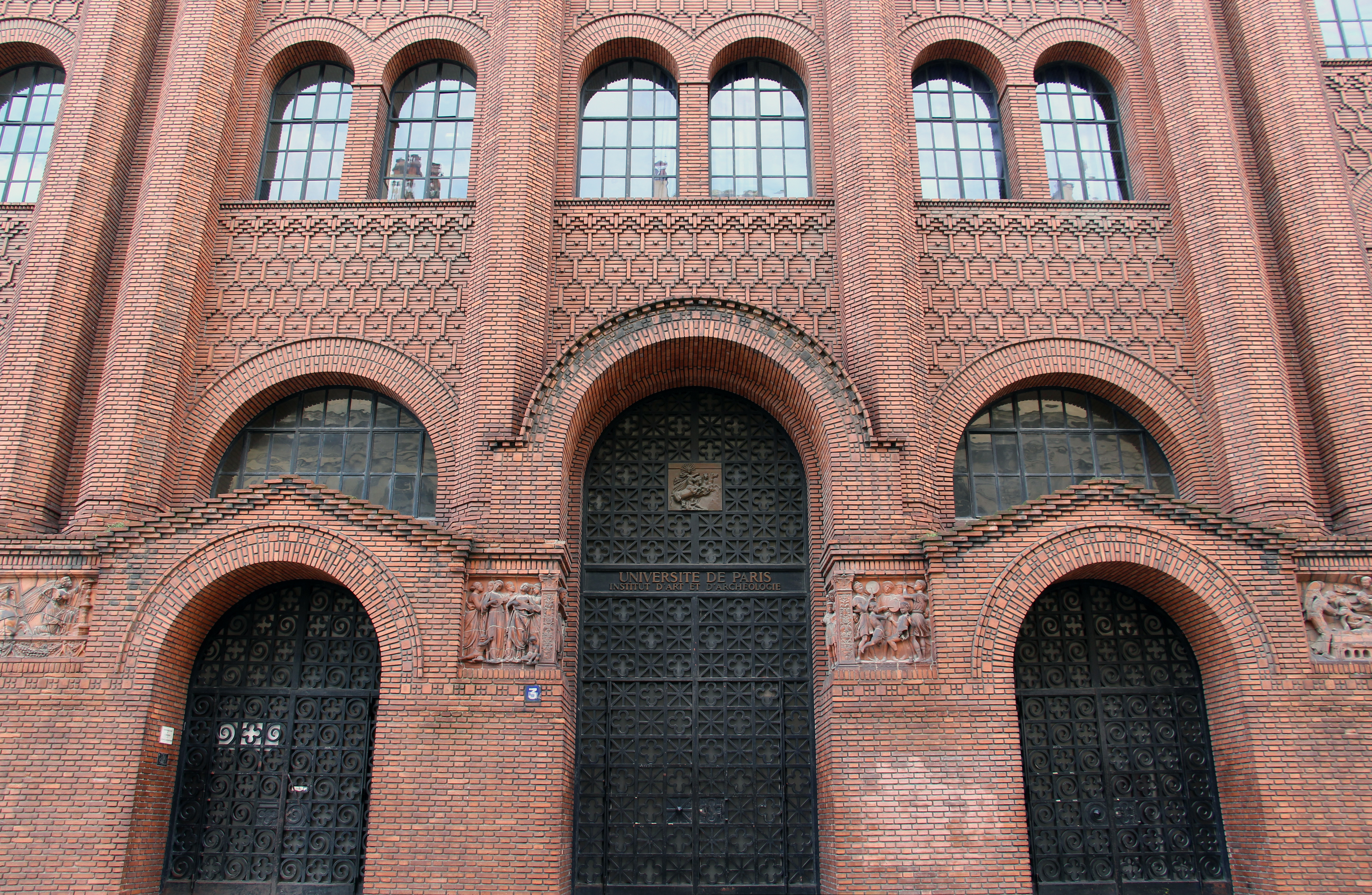
Entrance to the Sorbonne Institute of Art and Archaeology
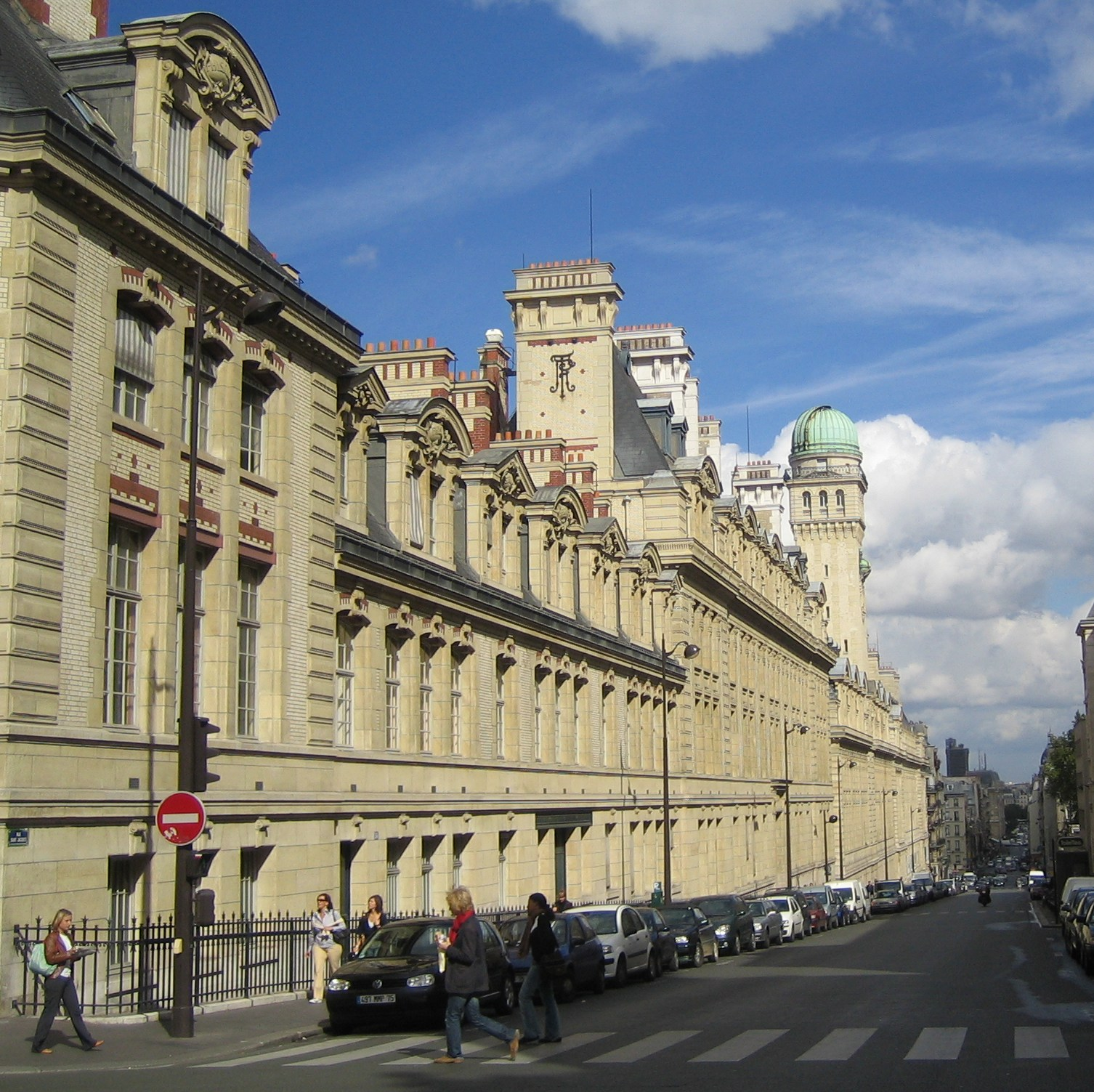

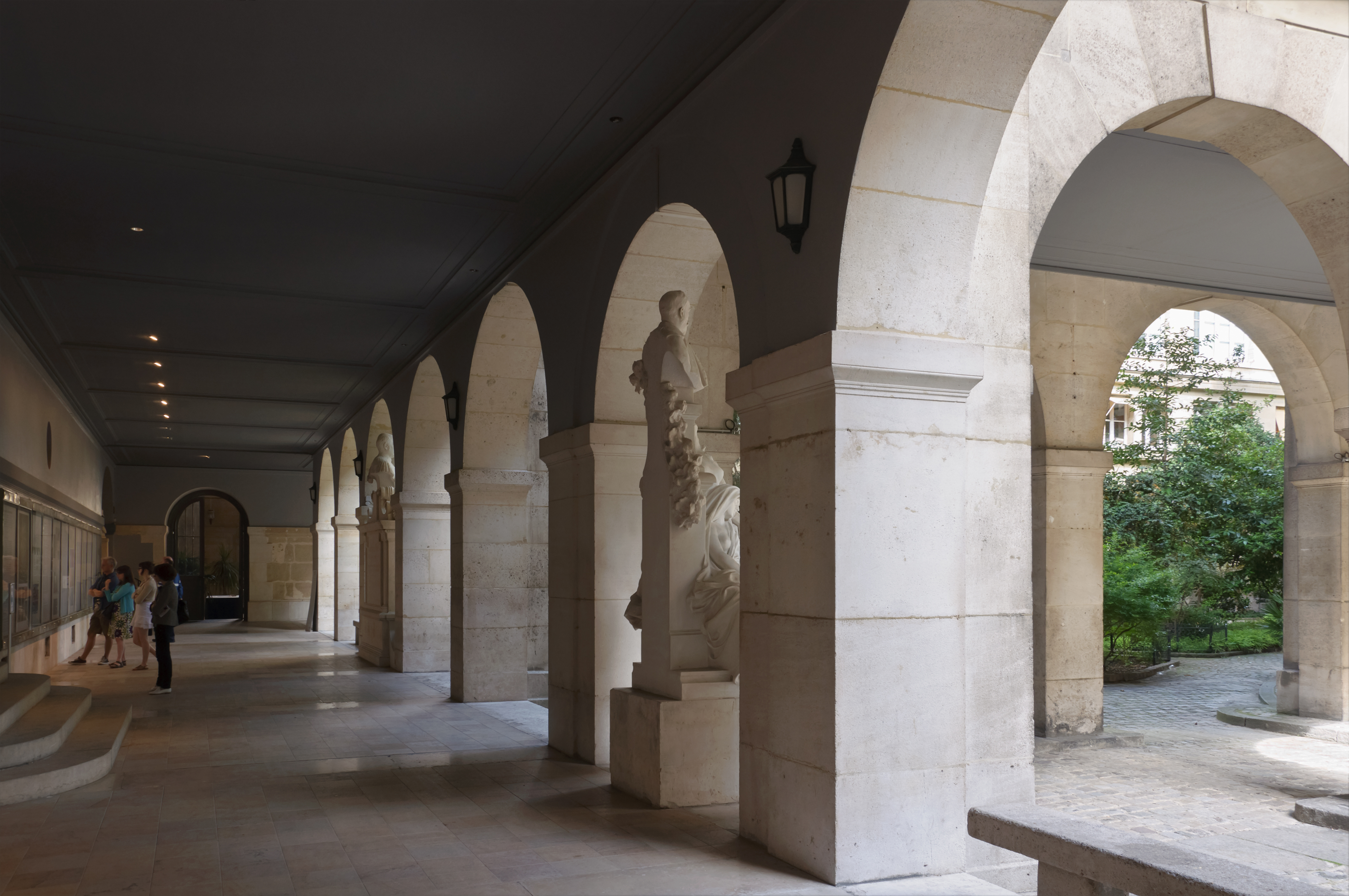

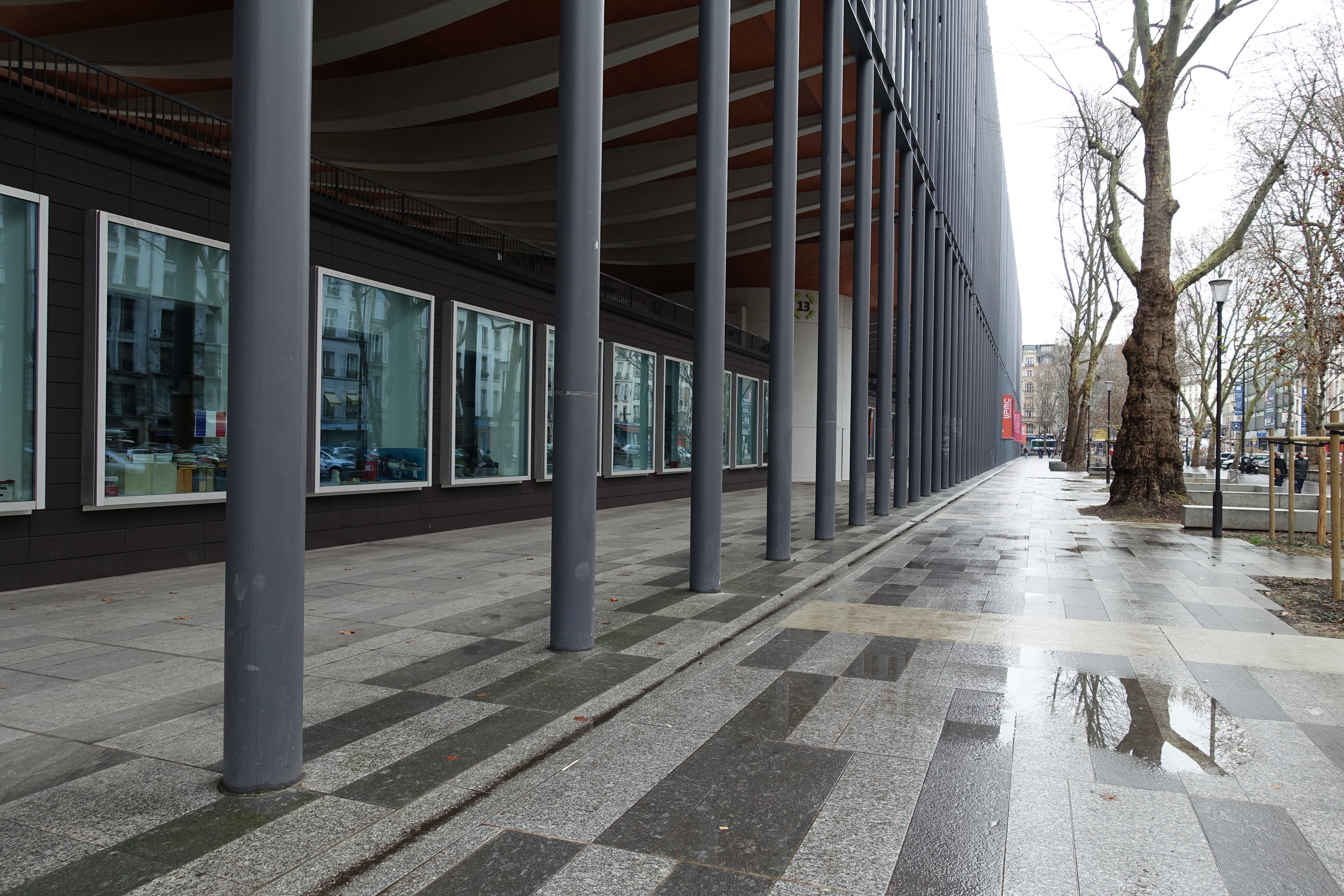

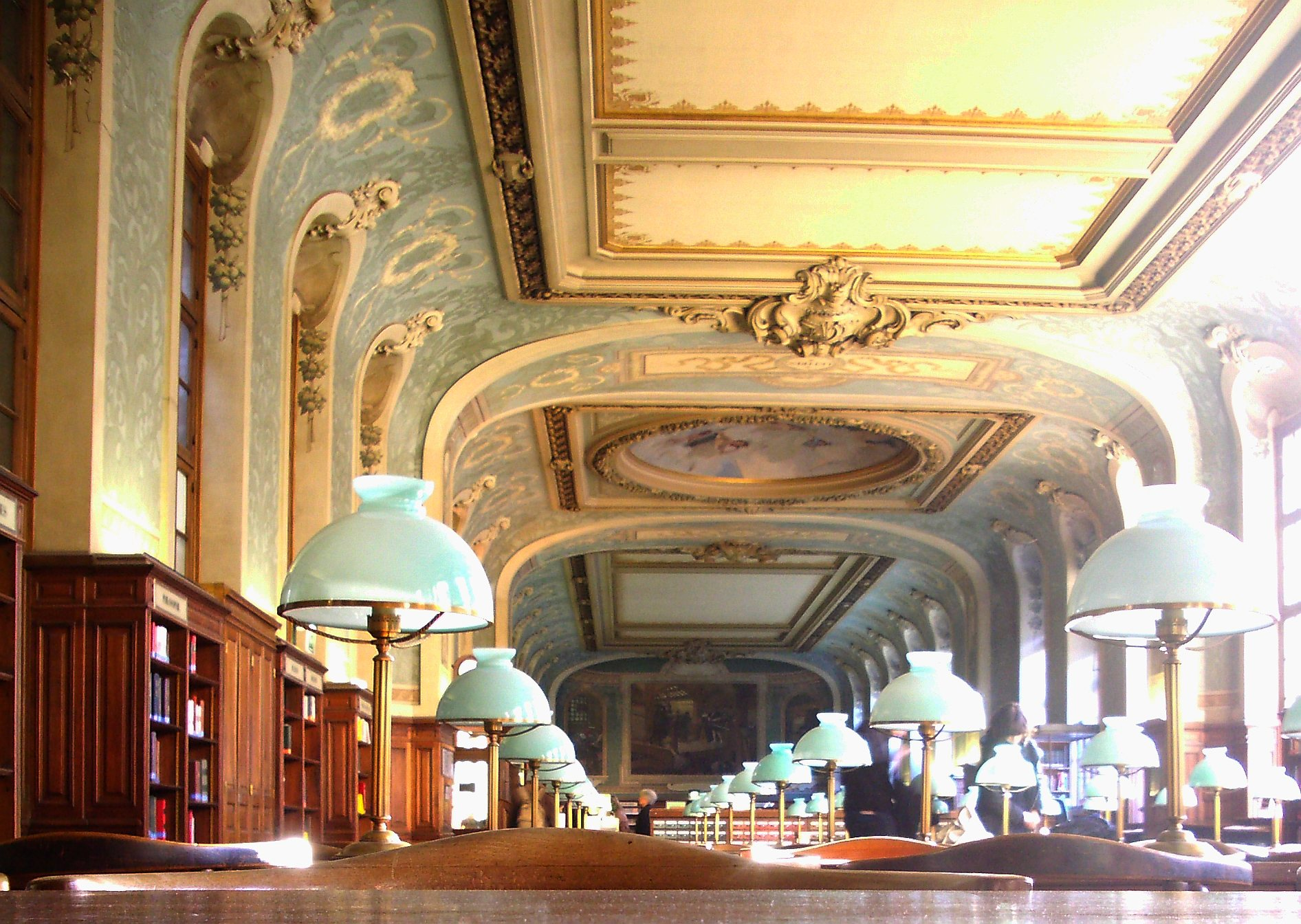

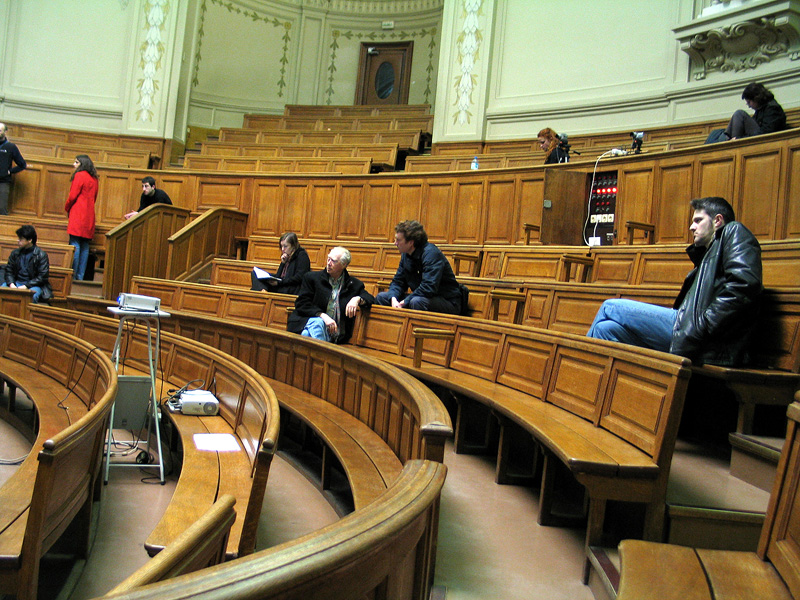

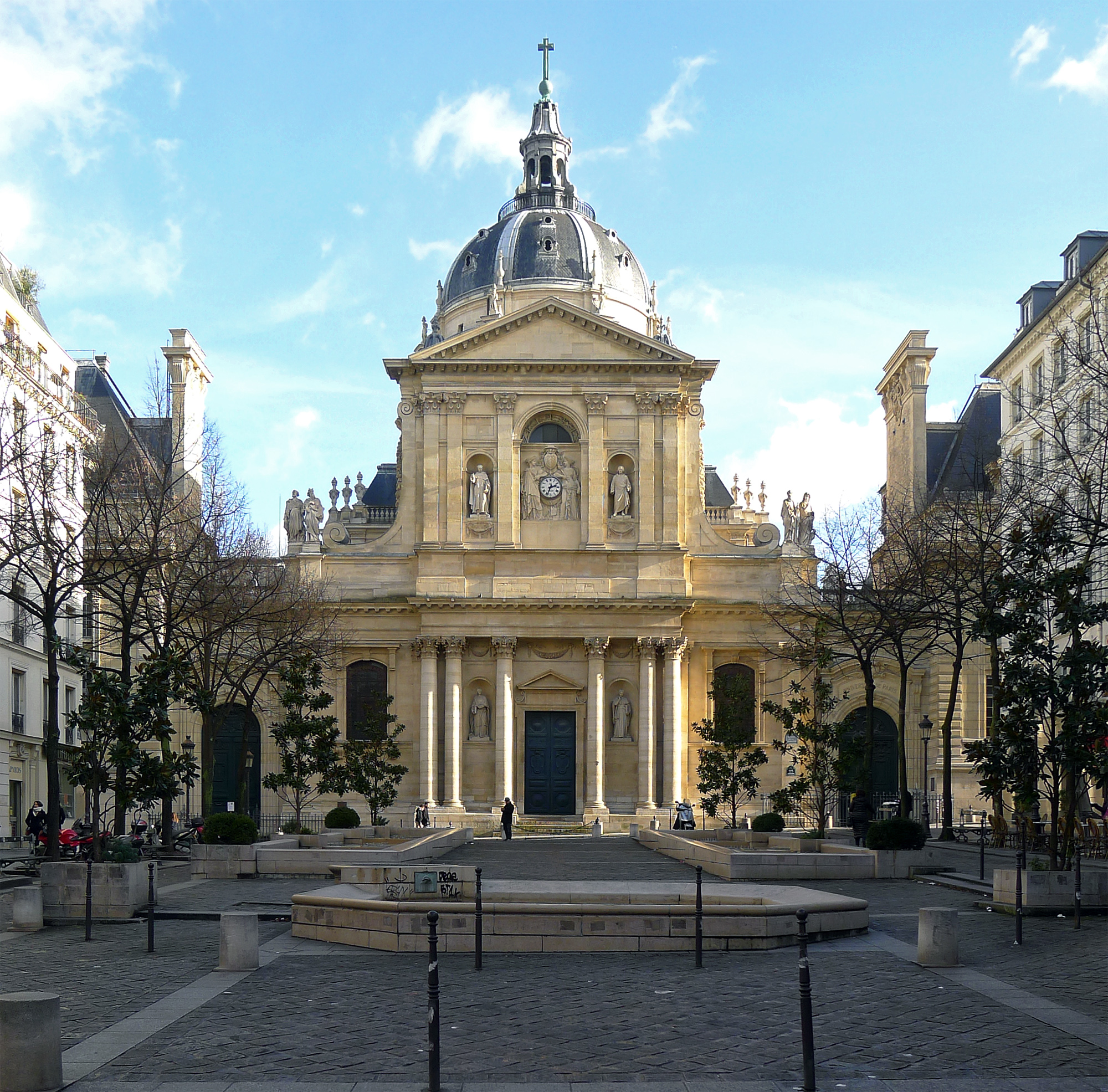
Chapel of the main Sorbonne building

=== Main campuses ===
==== Sorbonne ====
Sorbonne University's historical campus is in the historic central Sorbonne building, located at 47 rue des Écoles, in the historic Latin Quarter university campus. The building is the undivided property of the 13 successor universities of the University of Paris, managed by the Chancellerie des Universités de Paris. Besides the monuments of the Cour d'Honneur, the Sorbonne Chapel and the Grand Amphithéâtre, the building houses the Sorbonne University Faculty of Arts and Humanities, the Academy of Paris Rectorat, the Chancellerie des Universités de Paris, and part of the universities Panthéon-Sorbonne, Sorbonne Nouvelle, Paris Cité and the École Nationale des Chartes as well as the École Pratique des Hautes Études that are constituent schools of PSL University.

Before the 19th century, the Sorbonne occupied several buildings. The chapel was built in 1622 by the then-Provisor of the University of Paris, Cardinal Richelieu, during the reign of Louis XIII. In 1881, politician Jules Ferry decided to convert the Sorbonne into one single building. Under the supervision of Pierre Greard, Chief Officer of the Education Authority of Paris, Henri-Paul Nénot constructed the current building from 1883 to 1901 that reflects a basic architectural uniformity. The integration of the chapel into the whole was also Nénot's work with the construction of a cour d'honneur. The Sorbonne building is generally reserved for undergraduate students in their third year and graduate students in certain academic disciplines. Only students in Semitic studies, regardless of level, take all their classes at the Sorbonne campus.

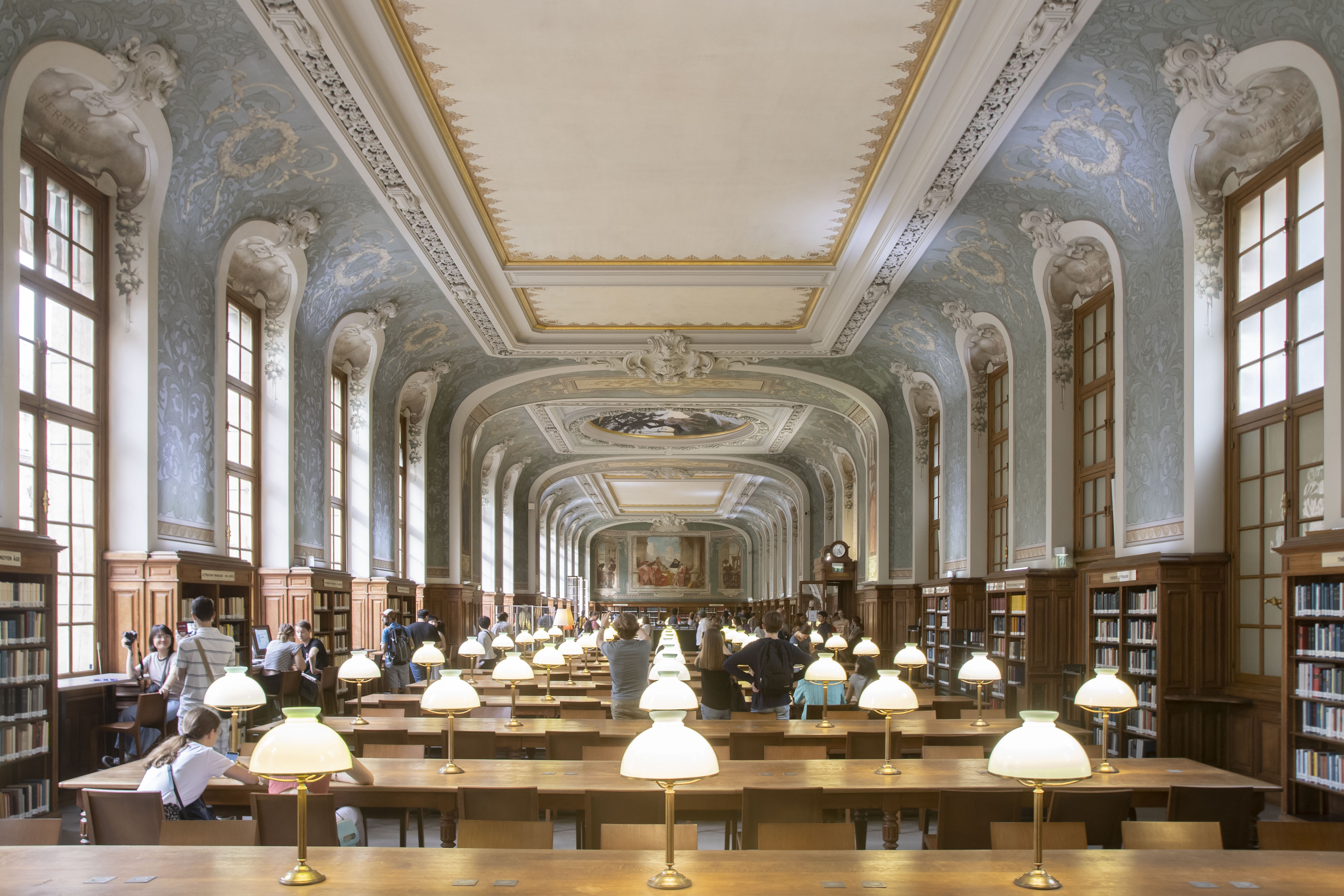
The Sorbonne Library

The Sorbonne Library is an inter-university library of the Panthéon-Sorbonne University, Sorbonne Nouvelle University, Sorbonne University, Paris Cité University, under the administration of Panthéon-Sorbonne. It is open exclusively to undergraduate students in their third year and graduate students. With the former archives of the now-defunct University of Paris, 2,500,000 books, 400,000 of them ancient, 2,500 historical manuscripts, 18,000 doctoral dissertation papers, 17,750 past and current French and international periodicals and 7,100 historical printing plates, the Sorbonne Library is the largest university library in Paris and was entirely refurbished in 2013.

The Sorbonne University Library's Arts and Humanities Department (French: Pôle Lettres de la Bibliothèque de Sorbonne Université), part of the Faculty of Arts and Humanities, offers its students and teaching staff access to 18 libraries and thematic collections. The catalog includes 600,000 books, 350,000 e-books, 60,000 issues of online periodicals and 165 databases.

==== Pierre and Marie Curie (formerly Jussieu) ====
The largest of Sorbonne University's campuses is Jussieu Campus, officially named "Pierre and Marie Curie Campus". It houses the Sorbonne University Faculty of Science and Engineering and its Sorbonne Polytechnic School, Sorbonne Center for Artificial Intelligence, Sorbonne Institute for Environmental Transition, the Institute of Health Engineering (IUIS) and the Institute of Computing and Data Sciences (ISCD). The first buildings are from 1957. The main part of the campus, the "Grill d'Albert", was built in 1964, and was completely refurbished from 1996 to 2016.

Within the Sorbonne University Library, it houses 6 university libraries, including an important research library in mathematics and computer science.

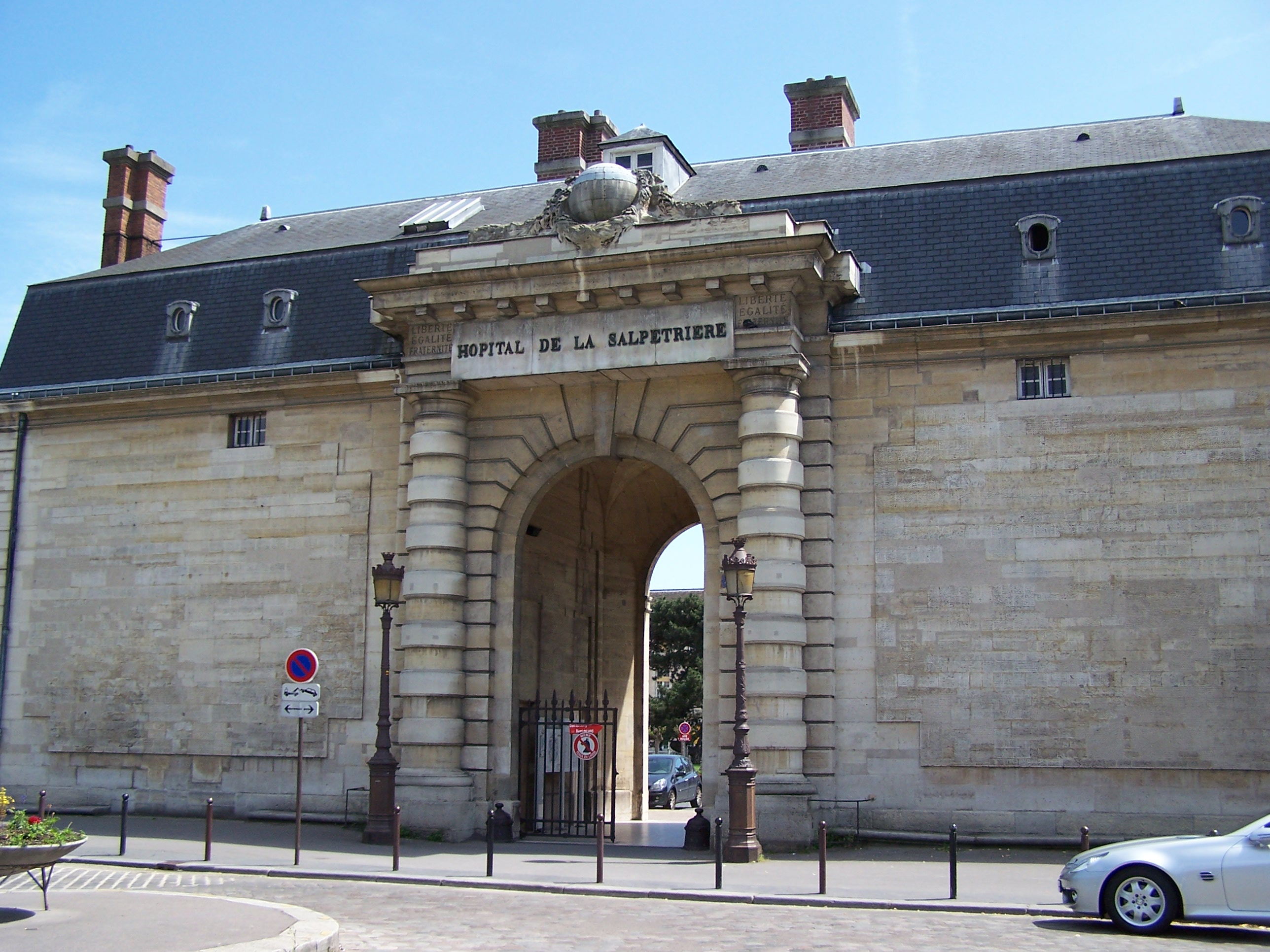
Entrance of the Pitié-Salpêtrière University Hospital in Paris.

==== Pitié-Salpêtrière ====
The Pitié-Salpêtrière Campus is home to Sorbonne University Faculty of Health Sciences and its Department of Medical Studies. It is located at the Pitié-Salpêtrière Hospital and University Center (CHU), founded in 1657 in the 13th arrondissement of Paris. All undergraduate and graduate medical students study on this campus. Postgraduate courses are held at the Cordeliers Convent on the Latin Quarter campus.

The hospital campus also houses the Sorbonne Health Simulation Department, the Paris Brain Institute and the Institute of Cardiometabolism and Nutrition (IHU-ICAN). The campus is also home to the AP-HP Sorbonne University Hospital Group.

=== Secondary campuses ===
==== Clignancourt and Malesherbes ====
Two other campuses are the Clignancourt and Malesherbes centers of the Sorbonne University Faculty of Arts and Humanities. Undergraduate students in their first and second years of study in Philosophy, History, Geography, Musicology, English and Spanish take their classes at the Clignancourt center. The Clignancourt Library contains 78,000 works, 210 French and international periodicals and 800 educational DVDs.

Undergraduate students in their first and second years of study in French literature, French language, Latin, and Ancient Greek take their classes at the Malesherbes center. All undergraduate students in these academic disciplines study in the central Sorbonne building in their third year. Undergraduate and graduate students in German studies, Slavic studies, Italic studies and Romanian studies, regardless of level, take all of their classes at the Malesherbes center. The Malesherbes center also hosts three research centers in Italian culture, the cultures and literature of central Europe and the Balkans and the Germanic, Nordic and Dutch centers. The Malesherbes Library contains 200,000 works specializing in the study of foreign languages and cultures and 1,200 past and current French and international periodicals. More than 50,000 doctoral dissertations are available for public viewing.

==== Michelet ====
Undergraduate Art History and Archeology students of the Sorbonne University Faculty of Arts and Humanities take their classes at the Institut d'Art et d'Archéologie, located at the main entrance of the Jardin du Luxembourg. Constructed by architect Paul Bigot between 1925 and 1930, the Mesopotamian-style building was classified as a national historic building in 1996. It hosts the Michelet Library that contains 100,000 volumes of work on art history and archeology with 100 French and international periodicals. Only 10,000 of the art history and archeology works are open to students, the others requiring special authorization of usage. Graduate Art History and Archeology students take their courses at the Institut National de l'Histoire de l'Art in the Galerie Colbert, a partnered national institution of the university.

==== Maison de la Recherche ====
The Maison de la Recherche campus is the central building for doctoral studies that hosts the history and geography departments. It houses the Serpente Library that has 55,000 works and 292 past and current French and international periodicals. All doctoral dissertations since 1 January 1986 have been stored at the Serpente Library.

=== Other campuses in Paris ===
Both the Institut d'Urbanisme et d'Aménagement and the Institut d'Études Hispaniques in the Latin Quarter campus host third year and graduate students of Geography and Iberian and Latin American studies. The Marcel Bataillon Library houses the Institut d'Études Hispaniques' collection of 25,000 works on Iberian and Latin-American culture. Catalan studies take place at the Centre d'Études Catalanes in the Marais.

The Sorbonne University also includes the Saint-Antoine Campus for the study of medicine; the Cordeliers Convent, Curie and Raspail campuses for sciences studies.

=== Sorbonne University Abu Dhabi ===
An international agreement between Sorbonne and the government of Abu Dhabi was signed on 19 February 2006, to bring an outpost of Sorbonne University to Abu Dhabi. Sorbonne University Abu Dhabi (SUAD) was established on 30 May 2008 on Reem Island by a decree of the ruler of Abu Dhabi of the United Arab Emirates. Many programs are taught in French but the graduate course in Physics and most of the masters programmes, are taught in English. An intensive French language programme is available for one or two-year(s) to students who do not meet the French language requirement for registration. Abu Dhabi was keen to create an international hub in culture and education, having also signed a contract with the Louvre in 2007 to create the Louvre Abu Dhabi, and with New York University in 2007 to create New York University Abu Dhabi. SUAD is jointly governed by the Abu Dhabi Education Council (ADEC) and by SUAD's board of trustees, three of whom are appointed by Sorbonne University and the other three are appointed by the Abu Dhabi Executive Council. The president of SUAD is the president of Sorbonne University in Paris, from 2024 this was Prof Nathalie Drach-Temam.

== Academics and rankings ==
=== Rankings and reputation ===
Sorbonne University is consistently ranked in the top universities in Europe and the world. The first recognition of its existence as an integrated university came in 2018, when it appeared on the CWUR World University Rankings 2018–2019 in 29th place globally and 1st place in France.

University rankings

Global – Overall
- ARWU World: 43 (2022)
- CWUR World: 38 (2022–2023)
- CWTS World: 97 (2022)
- QS World: 59 (2024)
- Reuters World: 56 (2019)
- THE World: 75 (2024)
- USNWR Global: 56 (tie) (2024–25)

National – Overall
- ARWU National: 2 (2022)
- CWTS National: 1 (2020)
- CWUR National: 3 (2021–22)
- QS National: 3 (2021)
- THE National: 3 (2021)

In the Academic Ranking of World Universities 2020, Sorbonne University is ranked in range 39 globally and 3rd in France.

In the Times Higher Education European Teaching Rankings 2024, Sorbonne University was ranked in fourth place in France.

In the Times Higher Education World Reputation Rankings 2019, Sorbonne University was ranked in range 51–60 globally and 2nd in France.

The 2021 QS World University Rankings ranked Sorbonne University 83rd overall in the world and 3rd in France. Individual faculties at Sorbonne University also featured in the rankings.

Before the merger of Paris-Sorbonne University and Pierre and Marie Curie University, both had their own rankings in the world.

Its founding predecessor Paris-Sorbonne University was ranked 222 in the world by the QS World University Rankings 2015. By faculty, it was ranked 9 in modern languages, 36 in arts and humanities (1st in France), and 127 in social sciences and management (5th in France). By academic reputation, it was ranked 80 (2nd in France), according to the QS World University Rankings, and 2nd in overall highest international reputation of all academic institutions in France, according to the Times Higher Education 2015. In 2014 Paris-Sorbonne ranked 227 in the world, according to the QS World University Rankings, 115 for Social Sciences and Management, 33 for Arts and Humanities.

Pierre and Marie Curie University was often ranked as the best university in France. In 2014 UPMC was ranked 35th in the world, 6th in Europe and 1st in France by the Academic Ranking of World Universities. It was ranked 4th in the world in the field of mathematics by the same study. The 2013 QS World University Rankings ranked the university 112th overall in the world and 3rd in France. In 2013, according to University Ranking by Academic Performance (URAP), Université Pierre et Marie Curie is ranked first university in France, and 44th in the world. UPMC is a member of Sorbonne University Association.

=== International partnerships ===
Sorbonne students can study abroad for a semester or a year at partner institutions such as McGill University, University of Toronto, King's College London, and University of Warwick.

== Organization ==
Members have worked on several projects to strengthen the relations between them and potentially create a new international institution. The most famous projects are:

- the "Sorbonne College" (Collège des Licences de la Sorbonne) for bachelor's degrees,
- the "Sorbonne Faculty of Arts and Humanities", "Sorbonne Faculty of Health" and the "Sorbonne Faculty of Sciences" for graduate students,
- and the "Sorbonne Doctoral College" (Collège doctoral de la Sorbonne) for PhD students.

=== The Sorbonne College ===
Since 2014, the Sorbonne College for bachelor's degrees ("Collège des Licences de la Sorbonne") has been coordinating the academic projects of Sorbonne University with Panthéon-Assas University, the law school of the Sorbonne University Group which has not merged into the Sorbonne University and remained independent. It also offers cross-institutional academic courses in many fields, allowing students to graduate from both institutions. For example, some cross-institutional bachelor's degrees ("double licences") are proposed to students in:

- Science and History (Sorbonne)
- Science and Musicology (Sorbonne)
- Science and Philosophy (Sorbonne)
- Science and Chinese (Sorbonne)
- Science and German (Sorbonne)
- Law and History (Panthéon-Assas / Sorbonne)
- Law and Art History (Panthéon-Assas / Sorbonne)
- Law and Science (Panthéon-Assas / Sorbonne)
- History and Media (Sorbonne / Panthéon-Assas)

As it is the case in the Anglo-American university system, Sorbonne University proposes a major-minor system, that is currently being deployed at the university.

Sorbonne University, in partnership with INSEAD, also offers all of its alumni and PhD students a professionalizing course in business management to complete their curriculum.

=== The Doctoral College ===
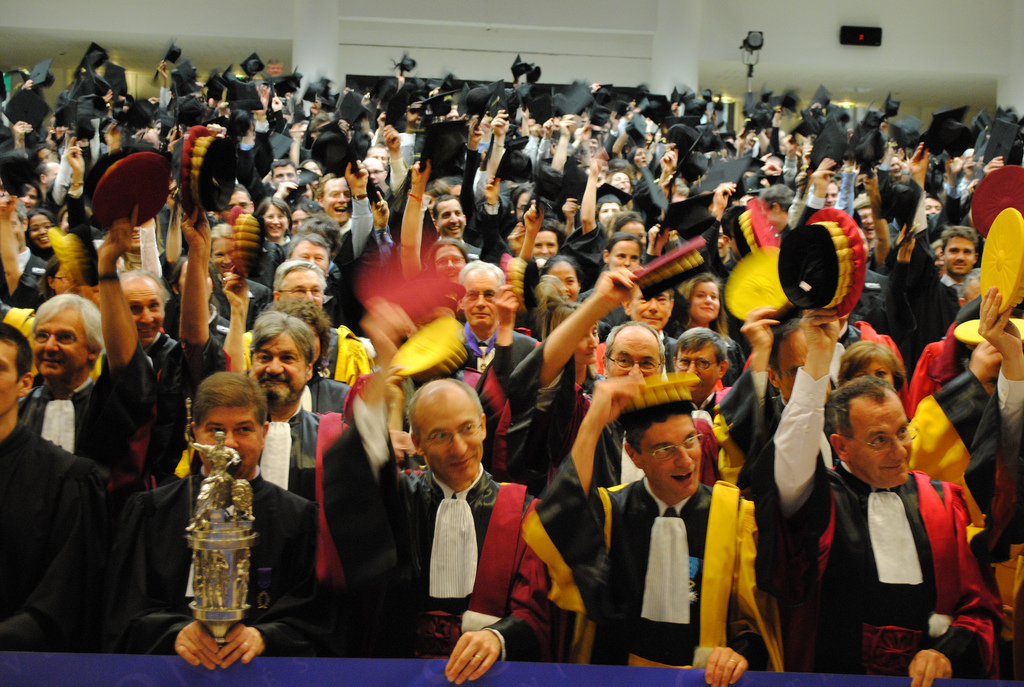
Sorbonne University's graduation ceremony, May 2011

Since 2010, every PhD student is being delivered an honorary diploma labeled Sorbonne University. This diploma highlights and gathers the skills of the doctors and researchers from the institutions that form Sorbonne University.

The Sorbonne Doctoral College, created in 2013, coordinates the activities of the 26 doctoral schools. Since 2014, it has developed cross-disciplinary PhDs between the different members of the Sorbonne University Association.

Sorbonne University's doctoral schools
Doctoral school	Fields
Énergie, matière, univers	Chimie physique & chimie analytique de Paris centre
Énergie, matière, univers	Physique et chimie des matériaux
Énergie, matière, univers	Chimie moléculaire de Paris centre
Énergie, matière, univers	Astronomie et astrophysique
Énergie, matière, univers	Sciences de la Terre et physique de l'univers
Énergie, matière, univers	Physique en Ile-de-France
Modélisation et ingénierie	Informatique, télécommunications & électronique
Modélisation et ingénierie	Sciences mathématiques de Paris centre
Modélisation et ingénierie	Sciences mécaniques, acoustique, électronique et robotique
Terre vivante et environnement	Sciences de l'environnement
Terre vivante et environnement	Géosciences, ressources naturelles et environnement
Terre vivante et environnement	Sciences de la nature et de l'homme : écologie et évolution
Vie et santé	Cerveau, cognition, comportement
Vie et santé	Santé publique & sciences de l'information biomédicale
Vie et santé	Physiologie, physiopathologie et thérapeutique
Vie et santé	Complexité du vivant
Histoire-Géographie	École doctorale de géographie de Paris
Histoire-Géographie	Histoire de l'art et archéologie Paris-Sorbonne
Histoire-Géographie	Histoire moderne et contemporaine
Histoire-Géographie	Mondes anciens et médiévaux
Langues, lettres et civilisations	Littératures françaises et comparée
Langues, lettres et civilisations	Civilisations, cultures et sociétés
Langues, lettres et civilisations	Concepts et Language

Since 2011, Sorbonne University celebrates its graduates in a formal ceremony where every PhD graduate wears a scholar uniform.

=== Research ===
To strengthen the influence of its research infrastructures at the international level, Sorbonne University has developed several research programs aiming at reinforcing or exploring new fields of study. This innovative cross-disciplinary approach was embodied with the creation of four new academic positions gathering several establishments of the group:

- A Department of Digital Humanities, exploring the use of digital technologies in the social science
- A Department of Polychromatic Studies of Societies, associating architecture, anthropology, chemical physics, literature and art history
- A Department of Digital Health, exploring biomedical tools
- A Department of 3D Craniofacial Reconstruction

Sorbonne University has formed several partnerships enabling bilateral research programswith academic institutions such as the China Scholarship Council or the Brazilian foundation FAPERJ.

Sorbonne University is a member of the League of European Research Universities, which gathers 23 European universities such as Cambridge and Oxford.

== Collections ==
=== Scientific collections ===
The Sorbonne University houses eight notable scientific collections that are open to researchers. Some collections are open to the public as noted.

- Minerals – over 1500 minerals on display in 24 cases, open to the public
- Physics experiments models – models built by professors from the Sorbonne and UPMC to demonstrate different principles of physics
- Zoology – teaching collection of stuffed specimens, skeletal mounts, fluid parts, anatomical casts and insect boxes
- Paleontology – research collection of fossil invertebrates
- G. Lippmann collection – Research collection of 46 photographic plates created by Gabriel Lippmann in his studies of photography and the physics of light
- Charcot Library – Research collection of the personal library of neurologist Jean-Martin Charcot
- Paleobotany – Research collection of Fossil plants
- Musée Dupuytren – moved from Cordeliers, will be open to the public occasionally, features wax anatomical items and preserved specimens illustrating diseases and malformations.

== Nobel, Fields, and Turing Award laureates of Sorbonne University ==
This section lists Nobel Prize, Fields Medal, and Turing Award laureates affiliated with Sorbonne University or its direct predecessor institutions through education (strong if degree awarded) or employment (strong if with academic position). During the University of Paris period, an individual is counted only if their specialization is directly affiliated with either Faculty of Letters at University of Paris, which later became Paris-Sorbonne University (Paris IV), or Faculty of Science, which later became Pierre and Marie Curie University (UPMC, Paris VI).

=== Overall statistics ===
Award	Included
Nobel Prize	21 people (22 prizes)
Fields Medal	7
Turing Award	1

=== Nobel laureates ===
==== Pre-1971: Faculty of Sciences at undivided University of Paris (later became Paris VI or UPMC) ====
Name	Award (Year)	Degree / Position	Specialization	Notes	Ref.
Marie Curie	Physics (1903); Chemistry (1911)	PhD (Doctor of Science, 25 June 1903); Professor of Physics at the Sorbonne (from 1906, first woman professor)	Radioactivity	PhD thesis defended at the Sorbonne. Succeeded Pierre Curie's chair in 1906.	
Pierre Curie	Physics (1903)	Licentiate (master's equivalent) from the Sorbonne; Professor, Faculty of Sciences (1900); Titular Professor (1904)	Radioactivity, piezoelectricity	Studied at the Sorbonne; appointed to the Faculty of Sciences.	
Henri Becquerel	Physics (1903)	Doctor of Science (docteur-ès-sciences, 1888) from the University of Paris	Radioactivity	Degree from the University of Paris. No post-1971 successor issue (pre-split).	
Jean Perrin	Physics (1926)	Doctor of Science (1897); Professor of Physical Chemistry at the Sorbonne (1910–1940)	Discontinuous structure of matter (Brownian motion)	Both degree and employment at the University of Paris.	
Louis de Broglie	Physics (1929)	PhD (1924) from the Faculty of Sciences, University of Paris; Professor of Theoretical Physics at the Sorbonne (from 1932)	Wave nature of electrons (wave–particle duality)	PhD and professorship both at the University of Paris.	
Frédéric Joliot-Curie	Chemistry (1935)	Doctor of Science (1930); Lecturer, Faculty of Science, University of Paris (1935)	Artificial (induced) radioactivity	Degree and lectureship at the University of Paris.	
Irène Joliot-Curie	Chemistry (1935)	PhD (doctoral thesis, 1925); Professor, Faculty of Science, Paris (from 1937)	Artificial (induced) radioactivity	Studied at the Sorbonne; PhD and professorship at the University of Paris.	
Alfred Kastler	Physics (1966)	Doctor of Science (thèse d'État, 1936) from the Faculty of Sciences, University of Paris; Professor at the University of Paris	Optical pumping	Degree and employment at the University of Paris.	

Pre-1971: Faculty of Letters at undivided University of Paris (Later became Paris IV)

Name	Award (Year)	Degree / Position	Specialization	Notes	Ref.
Henri Bergson	Literature (1927)	BA from the Faculty of Letters, University of Paris	Philosophy, literature	BA from Faculty of Letters → Paris IV → Sorbonne.	
Romain Rolland	Literature (1915)	DLitt (Doctor of Letters) from the Faculty of Letters, University of Paris	Literature, pacifism	DLitt from Faculty of Letters → Paris IV → Sorbonne.	
Jean-Paul Sartre	Literature (1964)	BA, MA from the Faculty of Letters, University of Paris	Existentialism, literature	BA/MA from Faculty of Letters → Paris IV → Sorbonne.	
Ferdinand Buisson	Peace (1927)	DLitt (Doctor of Letters) from the Faculty of Letters, University of Paris	Education, pacifism	DLitt from Faculty of Letters → Paris IV → Sorbonne.	
Patrick Modiano	Literature (2014)	Attendee at the Faculty of Letters, University of Paris (no degree)	Literature	Attended courses at the Sorbonne (Faculty of Letters → Paris IV). Weak affiliation.	
T. S. Eliot	Literature (1948)	Attendee at the Faculty of Letters; Visitor (faculty list) (no degree)	Poetry	Attended courses at the Sorbonne; later listed as Visitor. Weak affiliation.	

==== Post-1971: UPMC (Paris VI) and Paris (IV)→ Sorbonne University ====
Name	Award (Year)	Degree / Position	Specialization	Notes	Ref.
Claude Cohen-Tannoudji	Physics (1997)	PhD (1962); Professor at the University of Paris (1964–1973)	Laser cooling and trapping of atoms	PhD submitted Dec 1962 (pre-split). Professorship 1964–1973 spans the split; post-1971 position at UPMC (Paris VI).	
Luc Montagnier	Medicine (2008)	Doctorate (MD, 1960) from the Sorbonne; Assistant, Faculty of Sciences at the Sorbonne	Virology (HIV discovery)	All affiliations pre-split (1960). The Faculty of Sciences became UPMC (Paris VI) after the split.	
Françoise Barré-Sinoussi	Medicine (2008)	PhD (1974) from the Faculty of Sciences, University of Paris	Virology (HIV discovery)	PhD in 1974 from the Faculty of Sciences. The Faculty of Sciences became UPMC (Paris VI) after the split.	
Serge Haroche	Physics (2012)	PhD (1971) from Paris VI; Professor at Paris VI University (from 1975)	Quantum optics (cavity QED)	PhD explicitly from "University of Paris VI" (UPMC). Professorship also at Paris VI.	
Gérard Mourou	Physics (2018)	PhD (1973) from UPMC	Chirped pulse amplification (ultrafast laser physics)	PhD explicitly from "Université Pierre-et-Marie-Curie" (UPMC = Paris VI).	
Emmanuelle Charpentier	Chemistry (2020)	BSc, MSc, PhD (1995) from UPMC	CRISPR-Cas9 gene editing (microbiology)	All three degrees from UPMC (Paris VI). PhD in microbiology, 1995.	
Anne L'Huillier	Physics (2023)	MSc, PhD (1986) from UPMC	Attosecond physics (high-harmonic generation)	MSc and PhD from UPMC (Paris VI). PhD in 1986.	

=== Fields Medalists ===
Name	Award (Year)	Degree / Position	Specialization	Notes	Ref.
Jean-Pierre Serre	Fields Medal (1954)	PhD (Doctor of Science, 1951) from the Sorbonne, University of Paris	Algebraic topology, algebraic geometry, number theory	PhD from the Sorbonne (pre-split).	
Alain Connes	Fields Medal (1982)	PhD (UPMC); Prof at Paris VI; IHES; Collège de France	Operator algebras and noncommutative geometry	PhD at UPMC → '''Sorbonne''	
Laurent Lafforgue	Fields Medal (2002)	Professor at IMJ	Number theory and analysis	IMJ → Sorbonne	
Wendelin Werner	Fields Medal (2006)	PhD (1993) from the University of Paris VI (UPMC)	Stochastic processes, conformal invariance (2D statistical physics)	PhD explicitly from "Université Paris VI" (UPMC).	
Ngô Bảo Châu	Fields Medal (2010)	BS (Mathematics and Computer Science, 1990–1992) from UPMC (Paris VI)	Algebraic geometry, representation theory (Fundamental Lemma)	Undergraduate at UPMC (Paris VI) 1990–1992.	
Cédric Villani	Fields Medal (2010)	Director, Institut Henri Poincaré (2009–2017) — employment only	Kinetic theory, partial differential equations, optimal transport	Included solely for employment as Director of IHP, which is formally part of Sorbonne University.	
Artur Avila	Fields Medal (2014)	Researcher at IMJ — employment only	Dynamical systems and spectral theory	IMJ → Sorbonne + Paris Cité	

=== Turing Award laureates ===
Name	Award (Year)	Degree / Position	Specialization	Cross-check notes	Ref.
Yann LeCun	Turing Award (2018)	PhD in Computer Science (1987) from UPMC	Convolutional neural networks, deep learning	PhD explicitly from "Université Pierre et Marie Curie" (UPMC = Paris VI).	

== Notable alumni ==
- Raphael Armattoe, Ghanaian medical doctor, author, poet and politician.
- Francine Brunel-Reeves, Québécois singer, caller and researcher
- Marie Curie, Professor at the Sorbonne, first woman to win a Nobel Prize, the first person and the only woman to win the Nobel Prize twice, and the only person to win the Nobel Prize in two scientific fields.
- Simone de Beauvoir, French philosopher and notable feminist.
- Maura Delpero, Italian Oscar-nominated Director
- Elaine Greene, British literary agent
- Taha Hussein, was one of the most influential 20th-century Middle-Eastern writers and intellectuals, he was nominated for a Nobel Prize in literature fourteen times. Minister of education in 1950.
- Ľubica Karvašová, Slovak politician.
- Mona Khazinder, Saudi art curator and historian
- Jacqueline Ki-Zerbo, Malian women's rights activist, pro-democracy activist and participant in the endogenous development of Africa
- Ján Lajčiak, Sloval Lutheran pastor and orientalist
- Yann LeCun, Professor at New York University and Head of AI at Facebook, "founding father of convolutional nets"
- Søren Gosvig Olesen, Associate Professor, University of Copenhagen
- Yvonne Rokseth, composer and musicologist
- Hossein Towfigh, pioneer of Iranian press freedom & Editor-in-Chief of Towfigh Magazine, the most popular satirical weekly magazine in Iran.
- Charlotte and Laura Tremble, French synchronized swimmers
- Iza Zielińska, Polish anarchist and feminist activist.
- Fatou Kiné Diakhaté, Senegalese politician and economist

== See also ==
- Pierre and Marie Curie University
- Latin Quarter
- Laboratoire d'Informatique de Paris 6
- Sorbonne University Library
