= Sorbonne =

Sorbonne may refer to:

- Sorbonne (building), historic building in Paris, which housed the University of Paris and is now shared among multiple universities.
  - Sorbonne Chapel
- The University of Paris (c. 1150 – 1970)
  - Its components/successors or linked institution, such as:
    - College of Sorbonne (1253–1882), a theological college of the former University of Paris
    - One of its successors named "Sorbonne":
      - Chancellerie des Universités de Paris, the institution that administers the Sorbonne building and the common assets of its successors
      - Sorbonne University, Paris, including the former Paris 4, Paris 6, INSEAD, and other institutions
        - Paris-Sorbonne University (Paris 4, 1971 to 2017)
        - Sorbonne University Library
        - Sorbonne University Association
        - Sorbonne University Abu Dhabi
      - Panthéon-Sorbonne University (Paris 1)
        - Sorbonne Business School, at that university
        - Sorbonne Library, at that university
      - Sorbonne Nouvelle University, Paris
      - Sorbonne Paris North University, Greater Paris (formerly Paris 13)
    - Sorbonne-Assas International Law School (Paris 2)
- Quartier de la Sorbonne, part of the 5th arrondissement of Paris

== See also ==
- Robert de Sorbon (1201–1274), founder of the College of Sorbonne
- Sorbon (disambiguation)
- Sorbonne Law School (disambiguation)
- Cluny–La Sorbonne station, a Paris Metro station
