= Sorbonne University Library =

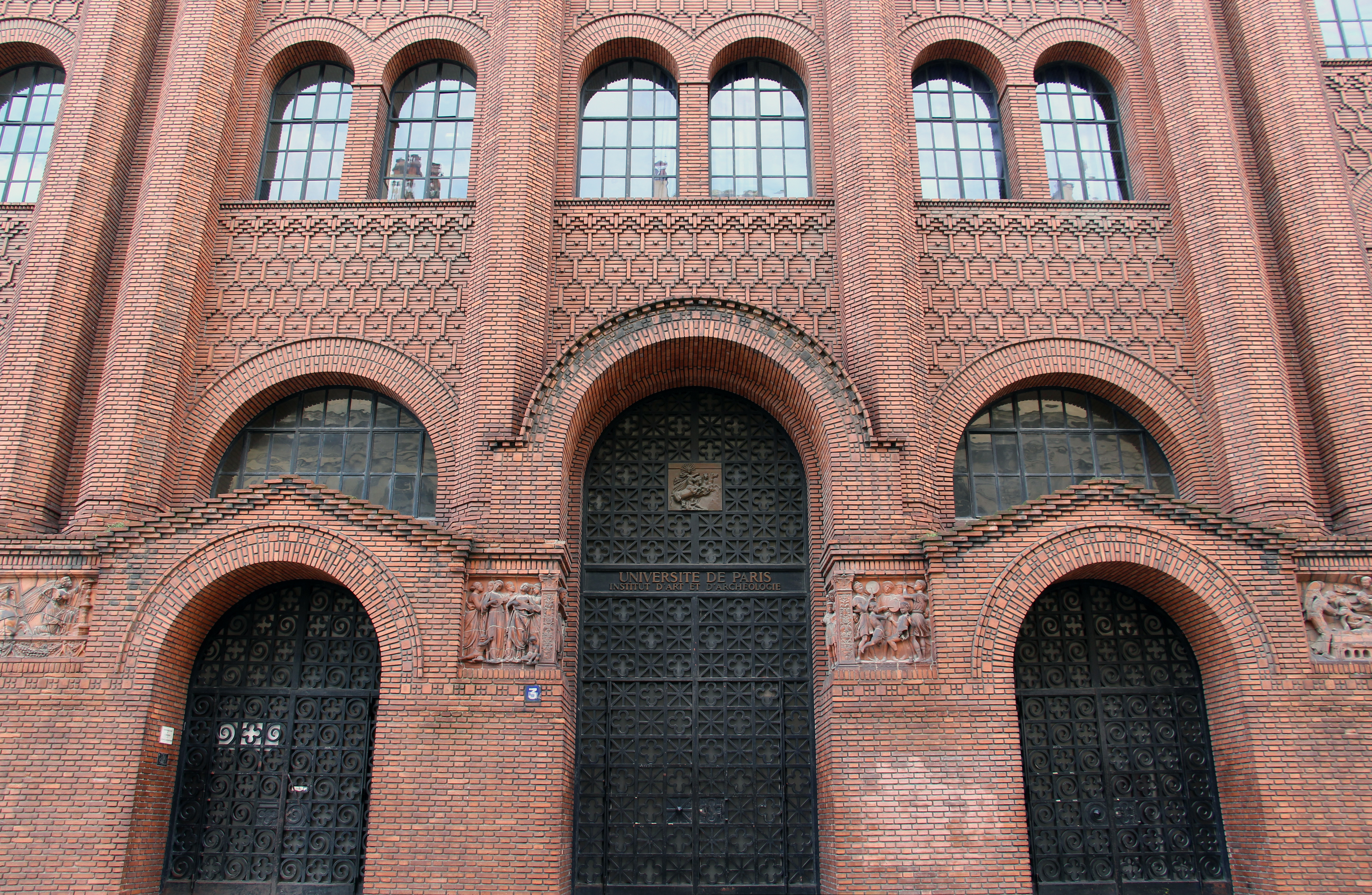
- Michelet Library, one of the largest academic library of Sorbonne University
- Location: Paris, France
- Type: Academic library system of Sorbonne University
- Established: 2018
- Branches: 18

Collection
- Items collected: 600,000 books, 350,000 e-books, 60,000 issues of online periodicals and 165 databases

Other information
- Budget: 3,1 million € (2022)
- Director: Anne-Catherine Fritzinger
- Website: www.sorbonne-universite.fr/en/education/sorbonne-university-library

Sorbonne University Library (French: Bibliothèque de Sorbonne Université) is the network of Sorbonne University's libraries and services. It is one of the largest academic library networks in Paris, along with the Université Paris Cité. It should not be confused with the Sorbonne Library, which is part of the Panthéon-Sorbonne University.

It is the result of the merger of the joint documentation services of the Pierre-et-Marie-Curie University (BIUSJ) and the University of Paris-Sorbonne, formerly located at 28, rue Serpente.

The Sorbonne University Library's Literature and Humanities Department (French: Pôle Lettres de la Bibliothèque de Sorbonne Université), part of the Faculté des lettres, offers its students and teaching staff access to 18 libraries and thematic collections. The catalog includes 600,000 books, 350,000 e-books, 60,000 issues of online periodicals and 165 databases.

The CNRS Henri Poincaré Institute has taken out subscriptions with the Sorbonne University Library to expand its collections.

== Sorbonne libraries ==
The university's common documentation service (SCD) is divided into three documentation hubs on several sites.

=== Literature and Humanities department ===
The "Lettres" department, attached to the Faculty of Arts and Humanities:

- Malesherbes library: opened in 1999, specializing in foreign languages, literature and civilizations in the Germanic, Dutch, Nordic, Slavic, Italian and Romanian domains, with a collection of 250,000 works;
- Clignancourt library: general, 70,000 items;
- Serpente library, in the Maison de la Recherche: specialized in history (ancient, modern and contemporary) and humanities (humanities, social and political sciences), 55,000 items;
- Marcel-Bataillon library, for Iberian and Latin American studies;
- Michelet library, in the Michelet center: specializing in art and archaeology, music and musicology, it was created in 1996 as the successor to the Jacques-Doucet Art and Archaeology Library. Approximately 100,000 volumes;

=== Sciences department ===
The "Sciences" department, attached to the Sorbonne Faculty of Science and Engineering - is located on the Jussieu campus:

- L1 library
- Licence (undergraduate) library (BDL)
- Atrium library
- Geosciences and Environment library
- Mathématiques Informatique Recherche library
- Biology-Chemistry-Physics research library

=== Health department ===
The "Health" department, attached to the Faculty of Health:

- Pitié-Salpêtrière library, 91 boulevard de l'Hôpital ;
- Dechaume library, 47 boulevard de l'Hôpital;
- Charcot library, located at the Institut du Cerveau (ICM), with a research collection of the personal library of neurologist Jean-Martin Charcot, 47 boulevard de l'Hôpital;
- Saint-Antoine library, located at 27 rue de Chaligny;
- Axial-Caroli library, 184 rue du Faubourg Saint-Antoine.

Several libraries are associated with the Sorbonne University Library (CELSA library, library of the Centre d'études catalanes, library of the Institut d'études augustiniennes, library of the Institut d'Astrophysique de Paris, library of the Observatoire océanologique de Banyuls-sur-Mer, etc.). There are also UFR libraries. Finally, Sorbonne University students have access to the various inter-university libraries in Paris: Sorbonne Library, Sainte-Barbe Library, Sainte-Geneviève Library, Bibliothèque universitaire des langues et civilisations (BULAC), etc.

== See also ==
- List of libraries in France
