= Institut de mathématiques de Jussieu – Paris Rive Gauche =

French mathematics research institute

- Parent institution: CNRS, Sorbonne University, Paris Cité University
- Established: 1994
- Focus: Fundamental mathematics
- Head: David Hernandez
- Staff: 200 permanent research, 500 total
- Location: Paris, France
- Coordinates: 48.826906°N 2.380329°E
- Interactive map of Institut de mathématiques de Jussieu – Paris Rive Gauche
- Website: https://www.imj-prg.fr

The Mathematics Institute of Jussieu–Paris Rive Gauche (French: Institut de mathématiques de Jussieu–Paris Rive Gauche, pronounced [ɛ̃stity də matematik də ʒysjø paʁi ʁiv ɡoʃ], IMJ-PRG) is a French research institute in fundamental mathematics. It is a "mixed research unit", with three parent organizations: the Centre national de la recherche scientifique, Sorbonne University, and the University of Paris. It is located in Paris, split between two campuses: Jussieu and Paris Rive Gauche.

It is the largest research center for fundamental mathematics in France. More than 200 permanent researchers work at the institute, around 100 PhD students, as well as emeritus professors, postdocs, invited researchers, and ATERs, and support staff.

The IMJ-PRG is the largest research unit linked to the doctoral school of mathematical sciences of Paris center (École doctorale de sciences mathématiques de Paris-Centre). It has its own journal, the Journal de l'institut de mathématiques de Jussieu, published by Cambridge University Press and covering all areas of fundamental mathematics.

Each year since 2001, the institute organizes an international summer school dedicated to a hot topic in current mathematical research.

== History ==
The institute was created on January 1, 1994, under the name Institut de mathématiques de Jussieu. It moved in 1999 to the Chevaleret location in Paris. In 2010, half of the institute moved back to Jussieu; in 2013, the other half moved to Paris Rive Gauche and the institute changed its name to the current one.

The institute is one of the founding members of the Research Federation in Mathematics of Paris Center (Fédération de recherche en mathématiques de Paris centre). Since 2007, it has been affiliated with the Mathematical Sciences Foundation of Paris (Fondation sciences mathématiques de Paris).

The directors of the Institute were successively: Christian Peskine (1994-2000), Harold Rosenberg (2000-04), Gilles Godefroy (2004-08), Håkan Eliasson (2008-12), Patrice Le Calvez (2012-16), Loïc Merel (2016-21), Olivier Biquard (2021-25), David Hernandez (2026-).

=== Distinctions ===
Several members of the IMJ-PRG received national and international awards for their research. Most prominently, Artur Avila received the Fields Medal in 2014,, Claire Voisin received the CNRS Gold medal in 2016,, and Michel Talagrand received the Abel prize in 2024.

== Themes ==
The research at the IMJ-PRG covers most of fundamental mathematics. It is subdivided in twelve team-projects: algebraic analysis; complex analysis and geometry; functional analysis; operator algebra; combinatorics and optimization; automorphic forms; history of mathematical sciences; geometry and dynamics; groups, representations, and geometry; mathematical logic; number theory; and algebraic topology and (algebraic) geometry.
