= Sorbon (disambiguation) =

Sorbon may refer to:

- Sorbon, Ardennes, France; a commune
- Jérémy Sorbon (born 1983) French soccer player
- Robert de Sorbon (1201-1274) founder of The Sorbonne

== See also ==
- Sorbonne (disambiguation)
