= Fatou Kiné Diakhaté =

Senegalese politician and economist

- Incumbent
- Assumed office 12 May 2024
- President: Bassirou Diomaye Faye
- Prime Minister: Ousmane Sonko

Personal details
- Party: PASTEF
- Education: Sorbonne University Paris Nord, University Paris 8 Vincennes
- Profession: Economist

Fatou Kiné Diakhaté is a Senegalese politician and economist. She is a member of the PASTEF political party. She is the first woman to hold the position of deputy chief of staff of the President of the Republic of Senegal.

== Biography ==
=== Education ===
Diakhaté began her studies by getting a scientific baccalaureate at the Marie Dior Sarr School Group. She then completed a two-year technical course in finance, insurance, and banking at the ICOGES Paris Group. She continued at Sorbonne University Paris Nord, where she earned an undergraduate professional quaification in finance, insurance, and banking, and later completed bachelor’s-level studies in economics and finance at the University of Paris 8 Vincennes–Saint-Denis.

Diakhaté completed graduate study at Sorbonne University Paris Nord, receiving a first-year master’s qualification in international economics and regulation, followed by a second-year master’s specialization in finance focused on banking risk management.

=== Career ===
Diakhaté started her career as client advisor at Societe Generale and at Banque Postale. She then worked at Credit Agricole Corporate & Investment Bank as a middle office manager in securitization. After that, she joined the Agence Française de Développement (AFD) Paris. Diakhaté served the following positions there: financial assistance management manager to control, quality manager in the Financial Management of Competitions (GFC) department, financial innovation mission manager. In 2018, she became a member of the PASTEF party.

=== Politics ===
In May 2024, she was given the post of deputy chief of staff to the President, the first time a woman has held that position. She assists Professor Mary Teuw Niane. She is also a member of Pastef’s Political Bureau with the role of deputy national secretary for the diaspora.
