= Laboratoire d'Informatique de Paris 6 =

French research unit

Coordinates: 48.8469°N 2.3543°E

LIP6 or Laboratoire d'Informatique de Paris 6 is a joint research unit (UMR 7606) specialized in computer science. It is one of the largest computer science laboratories in France, with more than 150 permanent researchers and around 130 PHD candidates. It is associated with the CNRS, the French state research organization, and Sorbonne University.

LIP6's current name comes from the acronym of its historical name as the Computer Science Laboratory of Paris 6 (in French: Laboratoire d’Informatique de Paris 6). It was founded in January 1997 through the fusion of three smaller research laboratories.

== Research & Activities ==
LIP6's activities focus on the modeling and resolution of fundamental computer science problems driven by their applications, as well as the implementation and validation of solutions through academic and industrial partnerships.

Research is carried by 18 teams spread across 4 main research axes:

- Artificial Intelligence and Data Science (AID)
- Architecture, Systems and Network (ASN)
- Safety, Security and Reliability (SSR)
- Theory and Mathematics for Computing (TMC)

LIP6's scientific production represents more than 500 publications per year, with around 50 theses being defended yearly. Research conducted at LIP6 also led to 84 patents and numerous software.

International cooperation is essential for LIP6. The unit maintains strong ties with universities in Brazil, Japan, China, the United States, and many European countries. In addition to academic research, LIP6 also has a long history of cooperation with industrial partners through the framework of national, European or international projects.

LIP6 currently hosts three European Research Council (ERC) projects:

- Quantum Superiority with Coherent State (QUSCO)
- Modular Open Platform for Static Analysis (MOPSA)
- Topological Reduction of Scientific 3D Data (TORI)

LIP6 is very active within Sorbonne University and fosters transdisciplinary collaborations between multiple Sorbonne-based research units. Most notably, the lab is strongly involved in Sorbonne Center for Artificial Intelligence (SCAI) and the Quantum Information Center Sorbonne (QICS), the latter being hosted within LIP6's offices.

== References and sources ==
- Rapport du comité d'experts. Report on LIP6 by a committee of independent experts. Published by AERES (Agence de l'évaluation de la recherche et de l'enseignement supérieur), France's independent research evaluation agency. February 2008. This report states: "Sa notoriété scientifique nationale et européenne est globalement très bonne" ("Its national and international scientific reputation is overall very good"). Retrieved 2013-03-02.
- Rapport d'évaluation de l'unité LIP6. Rapport publié le 28/03/2024 par le Haut Conseil de l'Evaluation de la Recherche et de l'Enseignement Supérieur.
