= École polytechnique universitaire de Sorbonne Université =

French engineering College

Coordinates: 48.84625°N 2.35779°E

Sorbonne University Polytechnic School
- École polytechnique universitaire de Sorbonne Université
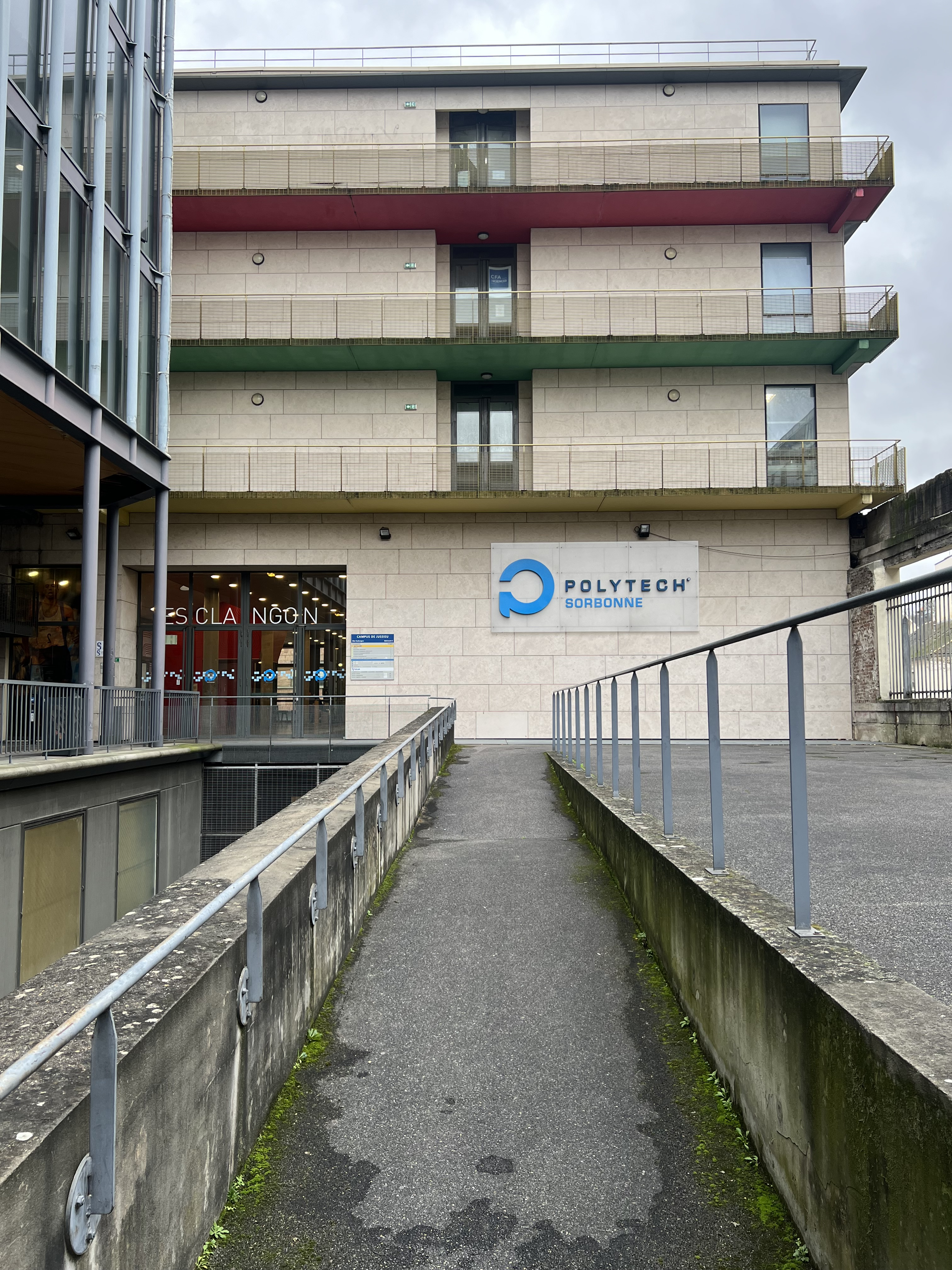
- Other names: Polytech Sorbonne
- Type: Public
- Established: 1983
- Parent institution: Sorbonne University
- Affiliations: Conférence des Grandes Écoles
- Location: Paris, France
- Website: www.polytech.sorbonne-universite.fr

The Sorbonne University Polytechnic School (École polytechnique universitaire de Sorbonne Université), or commonly Polytech Sorbonne, a French engineering grande école in Paris, France, created in 1983.

The school trains engineers in high sectors : Agribusiness, Electronics and Computers, Applied Mathematics and Computers, Materials, Robotics, Earth sciences, Mechanical engineering.

Located in the city of Paris, Polytech Sorbonne is a public higher education institution. The school is part of the Sorbonne University and is located on the university's Jussieu campus.
