= Søren Gosvig Olesen =

Danish philosopher and translator

- Born: June 23, 1956 (age 69); Langeskov, Denmark
- Education: Université de Paris I-Sorbonne
- Alma mater: Université de Nice
- Occupations: Philosopher, Translator
- Employer: University of Copenhagen
- Known for: Transcendental history
- Notable work: Transcendental History (2013)

Søren Gosvig Olesen (born 1956) is an associate professor in philosophy at the University of Copenhagen and has written extensively in the tradition of continental philosophy as well as translating several philosophers central to this tradition: Martin Heidegger, Jacques Derrida, Michel Foucault and Giorgio Agamben. Olesen is a graduate from Université de Paris I-Sorbonne, and defended his doctorate with Wissen und Phänomen (1997) from Université de Nice. Olesen has notably advanced the notion of transcendental history.

== Transcendental History ==
In his book Transcendental History (2013), Olesen addresses the two-fold question of what makes history possible and how history conditions human existence and knowledge. The concept of history in this sense encompasses something else and something more than what we are used to from everyday speech, and it also differs in this way from what one encounters as 'history' in the scientific discipline of history. In his book, Olesen gives an exposition of and a defense for the view, that historicality is the pivotal condition for human knowledge and existence. Something is historical under its mode of appearance, which has human existence as a transcendental condition. But on the other hand, what makes history possible is human existence. In this way, history of philosophy and philosophy of history become inseparable. History first became a problem for philosophy when philosophy became aware of itself as historically situated and contingent. Even the concept of identity, whose timelessness and unchanging nature were assumed in premodern philosophy, becomes temporal and thereby also historical and thus has history as a transcendental condition. The thesis central to Transcendental History is: It is not the subject or consciousness which is the transcendental condition of knowledge, but rather history. And history is furthermore the transcendental condition for the subject and consciousness. Transcendental history as a philosophical enterprise thus becomes both metaphilosophy, metaphysics, epistemology and philosophy of consciousness.

== Selected works ==
While most of Olesen's work has been in Danish and is therefore exclusive to a Danish audience, international publishers have also published works written in French, German, Italian, and English.

- La philosophie dans le texte (1982) Trans-Europ-Repress
- Wissen und Phänomen (1997) Königshausen & Neumann
- Transcendental historie (2000) Museum Tusculanum
- Breve storia del soggetto (2011) Udine, in the series: L'occhio e lo spirito no. 42
- Transcendentale Geschichte (2012) Mohr Siebeck
- Transcendental History (2013) Palgrave Macmillan
