= Jussieu Campus =

Campus of the Sorbonne in Paris

Coordinates: 48.846971°N 2.356333°E

- Campus of the Sorbonne University
- Campus Pierre-et-Marie-Curie
- Bird's-eye view of the campus in 2018
- Interactive map of Jussieu Campus
- Country: France
- Region: Île-de-France
- Ville: Paris
- Arrondissement: 5th
- Part of: Sorbonne University
- Boroughs: Host: Sorbonne Faculty of Science and Engineering, Sorbonne University Polytechnic School

The Jussieu Campus (Campus de Jussieu) or the Pierre-et-Marie-Curie Campus is a higher education campus located in the 5th arrondissement of Paris, France. It is the main campus of the Sorbonne Faculty of Science and Engineering. Paris Diderot University (now merged into Paris Cité University), was also originally located on the Jussieu campus, but moved to a new, independent campus, the Great Mills of Paris campus, in the new Paris Rive Gauche neighbourhood in 2006-2012.

== History ==
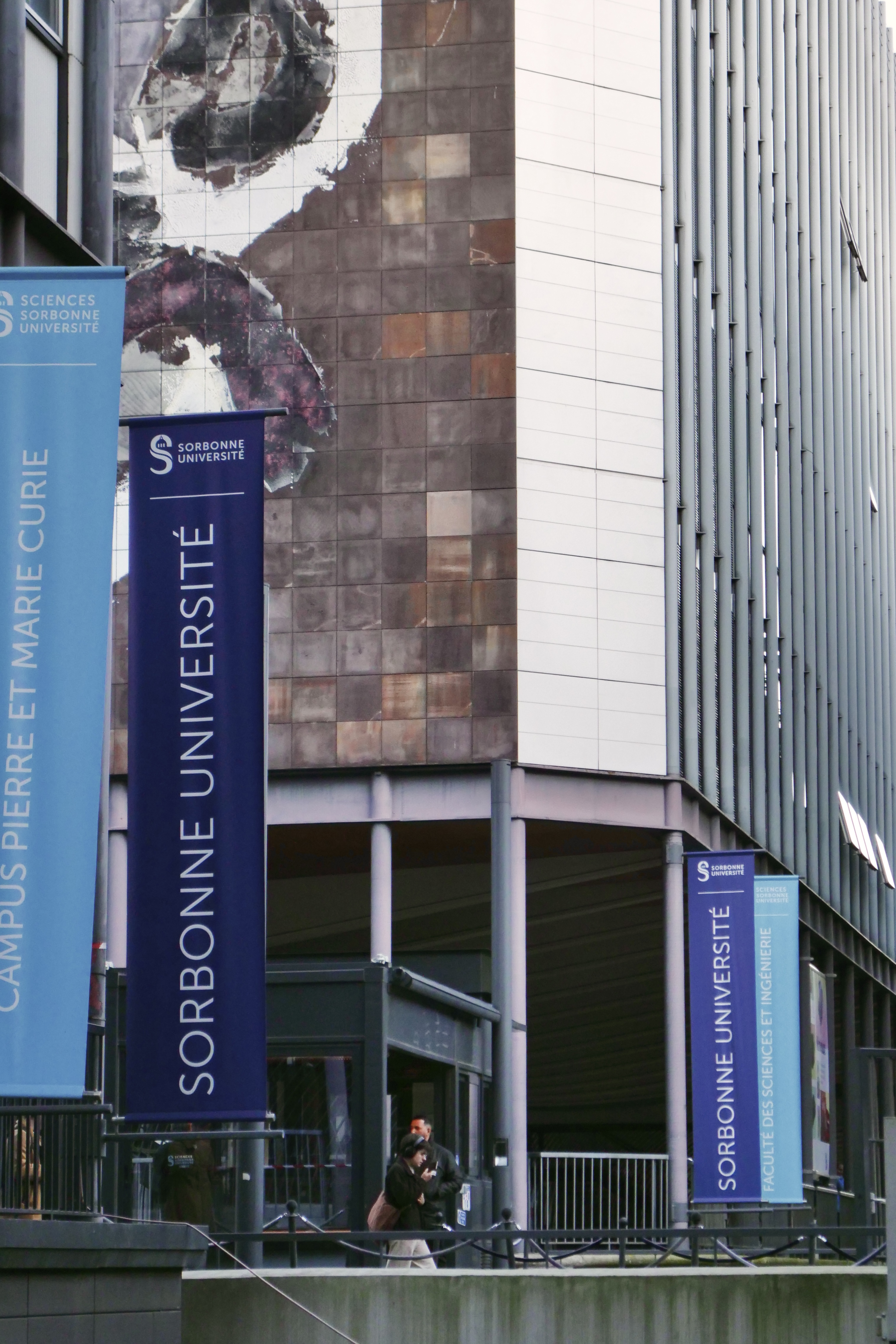
One of the entrances to Sorbonne University's Pierre-et-Marie-Curie campus, in 2024.

The campus was opened in 1951 and eventually, it would host a great part of the old faculty of sciences of the Sorbonne. The campus is built on the site of the former "Halle aux Vins," a wine market created by Napoleon Bonaparte. In 1957, the first university buildings were built along the Eastern bank of the River Seine (le quai Saint-Bernard), and Rue Cuvier. In order to allow the wine market to remain on the site, the architects planned to construct the buildings on stilts above the roads of the market.

However, in 1964, with over 20,000 science students graduating high school (the baby boom generation), the old Sorbonne could not accommodate the influx of students. The Minister of Culture André Malraux entrusted architect Édouard Albert with the task of rapidly constructing a new science campus on the site. Albert's grand vision of modular metallic buildings, designed to facilitate interdisciplinary work and improve teaching, was never achieved and was eventually abandoned in 1972.

== Facilities ==
Floor plan of the Jussieu Campus

Most of the campus consists in a regular grid of 6-floor wings; at the intersections are staircases and elevators. The grid is built above a large elevated slab; the buildings do not reach to the bottom of the slab, making it possible to walk across campus while remaining outdoors. Underneath the slab are ground-level and underground facilities, including a car park. The main front of Jussieu is bounded by a dry moat 10 meters deep; the main pedestrian entrance is a bridge over this moat that can be readily secured. The high-security features of the campus are likely a response to the student riots that occurred in 1968 in this neighbourhood.

The center of the campus is a skyscraper called Tour Zamansky, or Tour Jussieu, housing the university's administrative offices. Its height is 24 floors or 90 meters.

Some of the campus' research libraries (in mathematics, for instance) are among the largest and with the widest selection of books in France. Campus restaurants are located in the northeast corner of the campus, many of which afford a pleasant view of the Seine River.

== Controversies and asbestos ==
The campus was often decried as an architectural failure. The hollow space under the building wings enables wind to blow through constantly, making an unfriendly environment on the slab. Sound-proofing is so poor that classes regularly have to stop briefly when someone flushes the toilet next door. The identical grid intersections are confusing, and only long-time residents can move through without descending to the wind-blown ground level, since many corridors are locked for security (e.g. laboratories). The campus had increasingly deteriorated since its construction, and its older tower stairwells and exteriors were covered in perpetual graffiti.

The most worrisome aspect of the Jussieu architecture was its extensive use of asbestos as a fire retardant, whose fibers are carcinogenic when inhaled, and which is now prohibited as a building material. The risks are particularly acute for maintenance workers (drilling walls, for example). Even the fire retardation is considered insufficient to prevent the metal frames from collapsing in a large fire. An ambitious clean-up program was begun in 1997 after some high-profile protests. For cleanup, each wing is stripped down to the naked concrete frame and rebuilt using more modern materials. Many advocated the destruction and replacement of Jussieu instead, but the campus is protected as an architectural type, and must be restored to its original appearance.

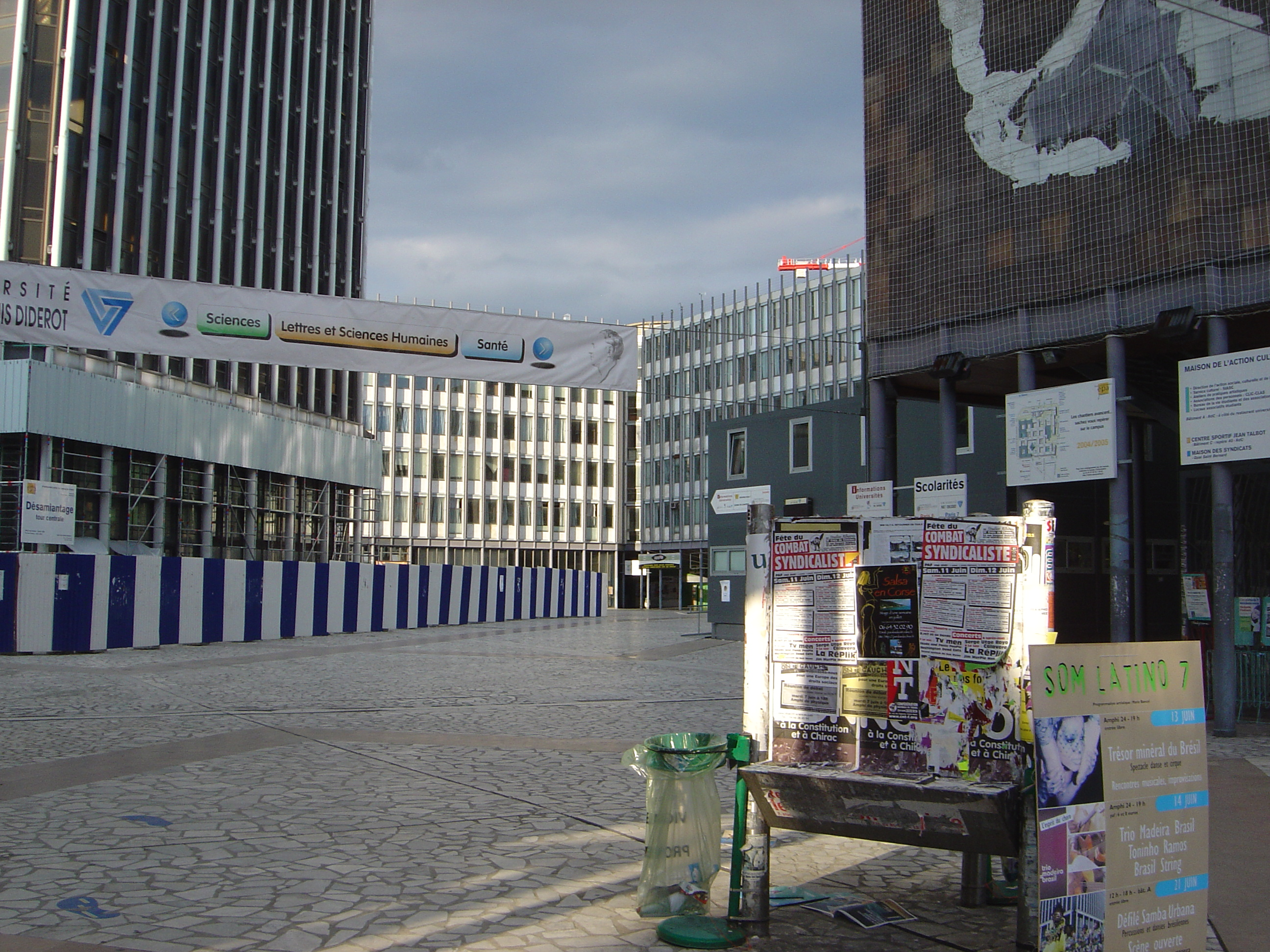
View of the campus in 2005 during asbestos removal.

In 1996 Claude Allègre, a well known French politician and former scientist, opposed the removal of asbestos from the campus, describing it as harmless and dismissing concerns about it as a form of "psychosis created by leftists". The campus' asbestos is deemed to have killed 22 people and caused serious health problems in 130 others.

The 1997–2016 refurbishment completely removed the asbestos, and also refurbished the campus. The graffiti were removed; sound proofing and thermal insulation was added; many of the round stairwells were replaced by straight ones; openings were made to create vistas and let in light; the prefabs were destroyed and replaced by gardens; courtyards were covered by transparent roofing; a dry garden was created around the Zamansky building; and a restaurant was opened in the South-East courtyard.

== Transportation ==
The campus is served by the Paris Métro station Jussieu with lines 7 and 10, as well as numerous bus lines (63, 67, 75, 86, 87, 89).

== See also ==
- List of tallest buildings and structures in the Paris region
