= University of Paris Faculty of Medicine =

French medical school

Faculty of Medicine of Paris
- Faculté de Médecine de Paris
- Motto: Urbi et orbi salus
- Motto in English: Healthy anytime, anywhere
- Type: Corporative, then public
- Active: 1200; 826 years ago–1971
- Parent institution: University of Paris (1896-1971)
- Dean: Georges Brouet (last)
- Location: Paris, France
- Campus: Urban
- Language: French, English
- Current successors: Paris Cité University (in the same building); Sorbonne University

The Faculty of Medicine of Paris has been a part of the University of Paris since 1794, having its origins in the ancient Faculty of Medicine of Paris founded around 1200. When it was refounded in 1808, it moved into the buildings of the former Royal Academy of Surgery at 12 rue de l'École-de-Médecine, later renamed as the École de Médecine buildings, and into the former Cordeliers convent at 15 rue de l'École-de-Médecine, in the Latin Quarter campus of Paris. It was split into several different faculties in 1971.

Founded in the 12th century, this faculty was one of the ‘companies’ of the ancient University of Paris and was housed in the Hôtel de la Bûcherie until 1775, when it moved to the former École des Décrets on rue Jean-de-Beauvais before being closed in 1793.

Today, the Presidency of University of Paris Cité and the Museum of the History of Medicine occupy no. 12, while the Faculty of Health of Université Paris-Cité, its UFR of Medicine, as well as the Presidency of Sorbonne University and its Cordeliers Research Centre occupy no. 15.

== History ==
=== 18th century: the Paris School of Health ===
On 8 August 1793, the Faculty of Medicine of the former University of Paris, then located on rue de la Bûcherie, and the Royal Academy of Surgery, located at 12, rue Marat (later rue de l'École-de-Médecine) were abolished by the National Convention.

On 4 December 1794, the Paris School of Health was created by decree, taking over the functions of the Faculty of Medicine of the former University of Paris. The buildings of the Royal Academy of Surgery (no. 12) and the former Cordeliers convent, which had become national property, were allocated to the new health school, and classes began in January 1795.

The Paris School of Health (École de Santé de Paris) was intended to train future surgeons for the French Republic's armies. In 1797, it took in more than 1,000 students, although it was only intended to train 300. They were taught anatomy, natural history and chemistry.

=== 19th century: the School, then the Faculty of Medicine in Paris ===
In 1798, the Paris School of Health became the Paris School of Medicine (École de Médecine de Paris), which gave its name to the street.

Under the First French Empire, the Paris School of Medicine was established as a faculty by decree on 17 March 1808. It became the ‘Faculté de Médecine de Paris’ (Paris Faculty of Medicine), thus reverting to its Ancien Régime title. In 1812, almost 1,300 students were enrolled in their first year at the faculty. The eastern part of the cloister of the Cordeliers convent was assigned to the Faculty, which retained its layout and even used the stones for its reconstruction. It expanded there, burying part of the old convent.

In 1835, the faculty created the Dupuytren Museum in the refectory building of the Cordeliers convent, at the same time as Jean Cruveilhier, a pupil of Guillaume Dupuytren, anatomist and professor of medicine, created a chair of pathological anatomy within the faculty.

=== 20th century ===
==== The new University of Paris ====
In 1896, the Paris Faculty of Medicine was merged with the four other Paris faculties to form the new University of Paris. In 1900, the faculty's ‘practical school’ was built by the French architect Léon Ginain on the site of the former Cordeliers convent buildings, which had been demolished in 1880, at 15, rue de l'École-de-Médecine.

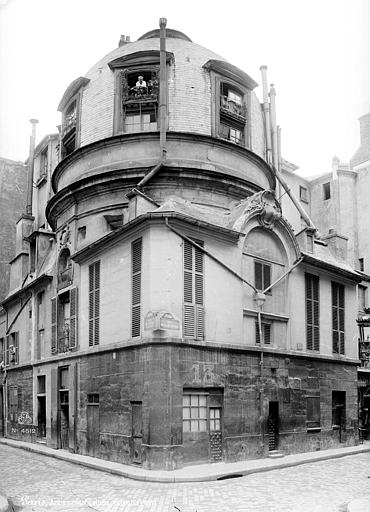
The seat of the Faculty of Medicine of the former University of Paris until 1793, rue de la Bûcherie.

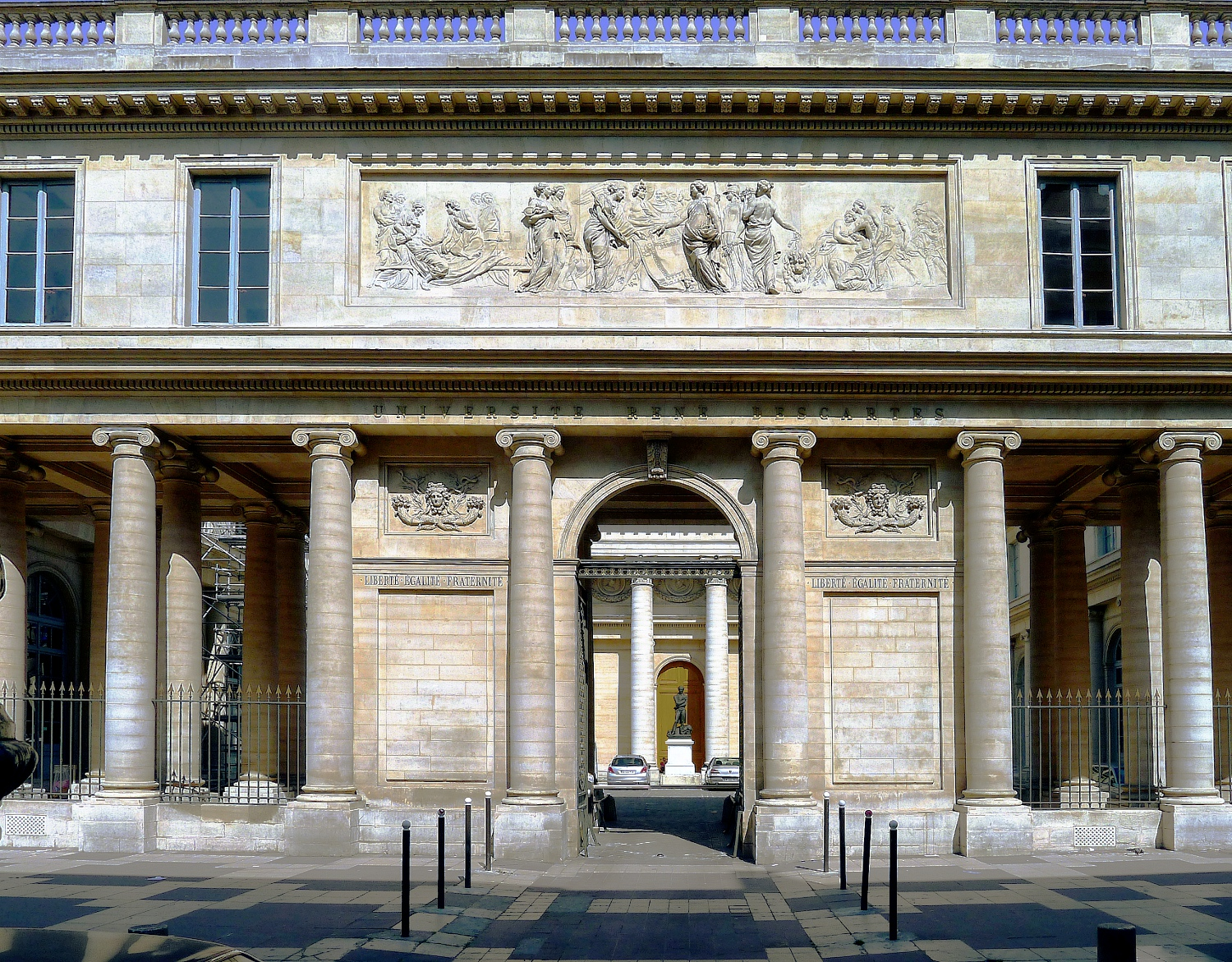
The building of the former École de Médecine, home to the faculty from 1808 to 1970. It is now the headquarters of Paris Cité University, and houses the university's library and museum.

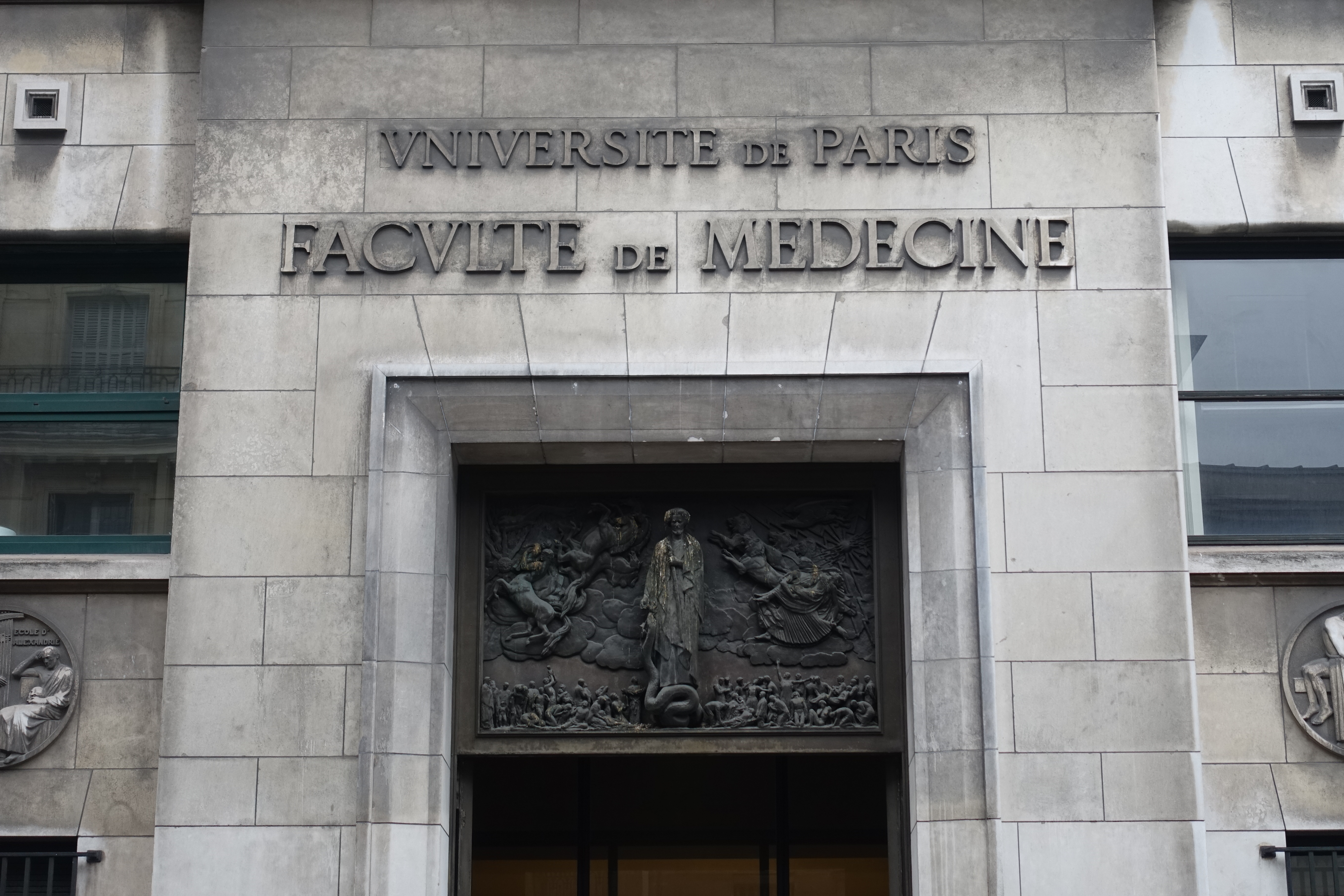
The ‘New Faculty of Medicine’ building, inaugurated in 1953 to alleviate the saturation of the faculty. It is now occupied by the Faculty of Sciences of University of Paris Cité.

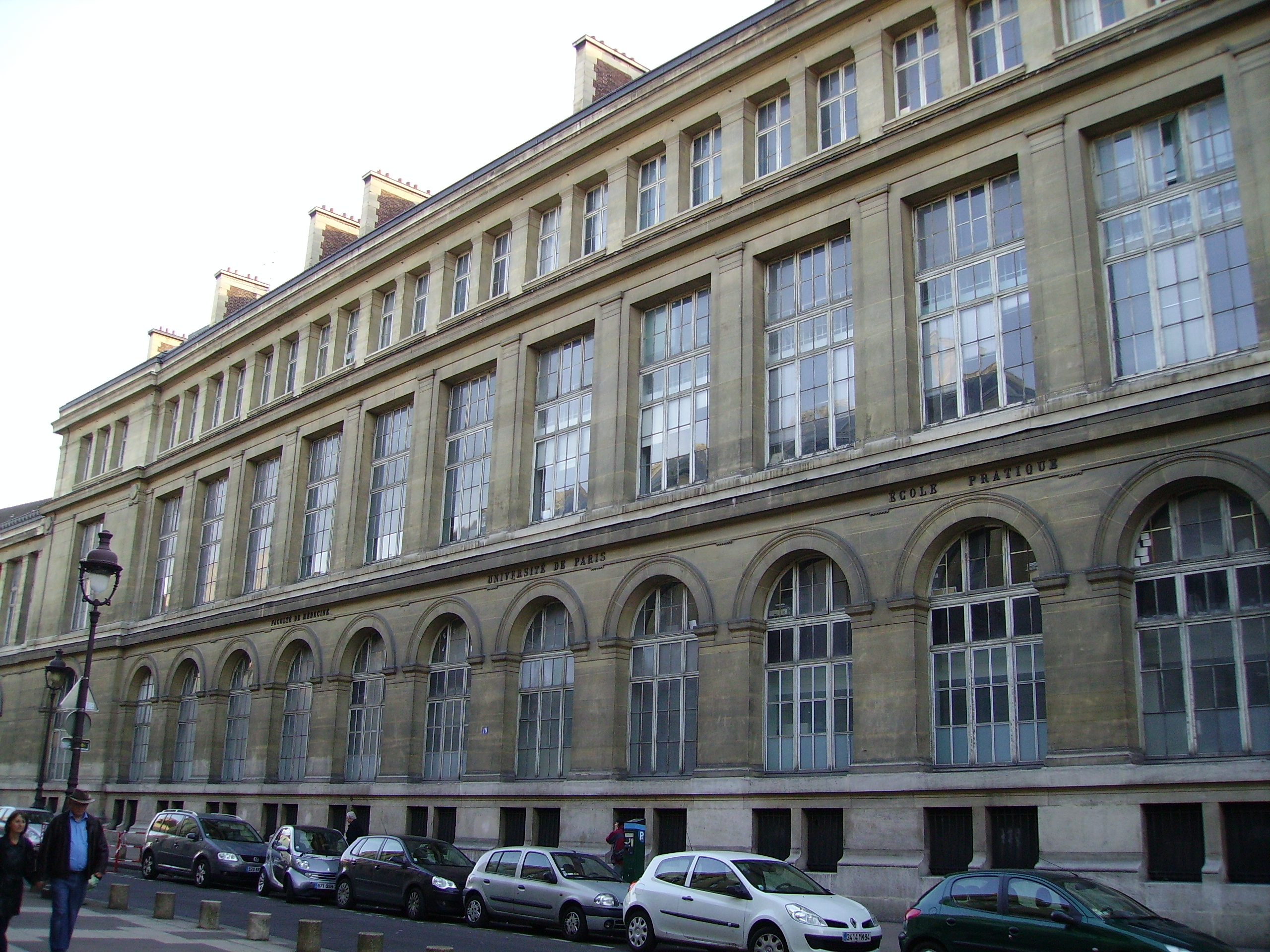
The École Pratique de la Faculté, inaugurated in 1900. It is now occupied by the Faculty of Health and the Presidency of Sorbonne University.

Separation of the Faculty and University of Paris

In 1970, the Paris Faculty of Medicine was divided between several new autonomous universities that shared out the Paris hospitals following the Faure Law, and today brought together in two different universities:

- the Paris Cité University Faculty of Health, which now accommodates more than 25,000 medical students, by grouping together two former training and research units: the Paris Centre Unit of Medecine ("UFR Paris Centre") (formerly part of Paris-Descartes, Paris-V), which was home to around 9,900 medical students, and the Paris North Unit of Medecine ("UFR Paris Nord") (formerly part of Paris-Diderot, Paris-VII), wanted by Professor Jean Bernard, who was opposed to a split between medicine and biology, and which was home to around 7,700 students;
- the Sorbonne University Faculty of Health Sciences (until 2017, part of the Pierre-et-Marie-Curie University (Paris VI): Pitié-Salpêtrière and Saint-Antoine, with around 8,000 students).

== Bibliography ==
- Corlieu, Auguste (1877). L'ancienne faculté de médecine de Paris. V. Adrien Delahaye. p. 283. OCLC 872162739.
- Corlieu, Auguste (1900). Les bâtiments de l'ancienne faculté de médecine de Paris rue de la Bûcherie. p. 14.
