= Cahiers Charles Maurras =

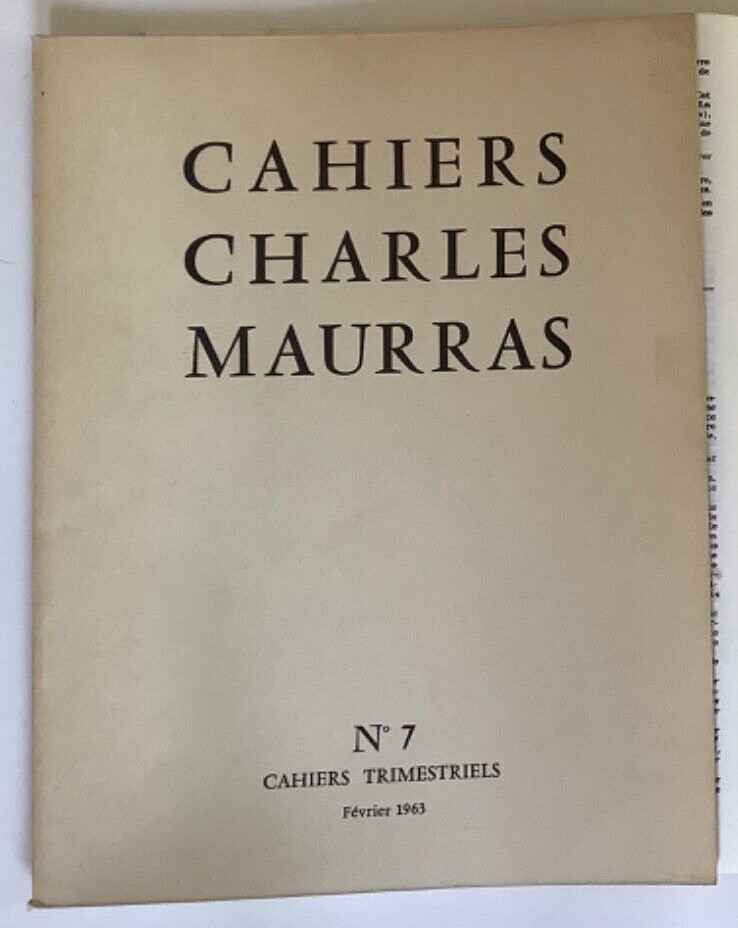
- Cahiers Charles Maurras, n°7, February 1963.
- Founder(s): Georges Calzant; Marguerite Calzant
- Founded: 1960
- Ceased publication: 1978
- Language: French
- Country: France

The Cahiers Charles Maurras were a quarterly journal founded by Georges Calzant and his wife Marguerite Calzant, published from 1960 to 1978. Its purpose was to extend the influence of the ideas of French journalist and politician Charles Maurras, the director of L'Action française. The journal featured collections of texts, studies, memories, and anecdotes aimed at preserving the legacy of the leading thinker of Action française.

According to historian Victor Nguyen, while the Cahiers Charles Maurras provide valuable information, they were produced with little "historical objectivity".

== Overview ==
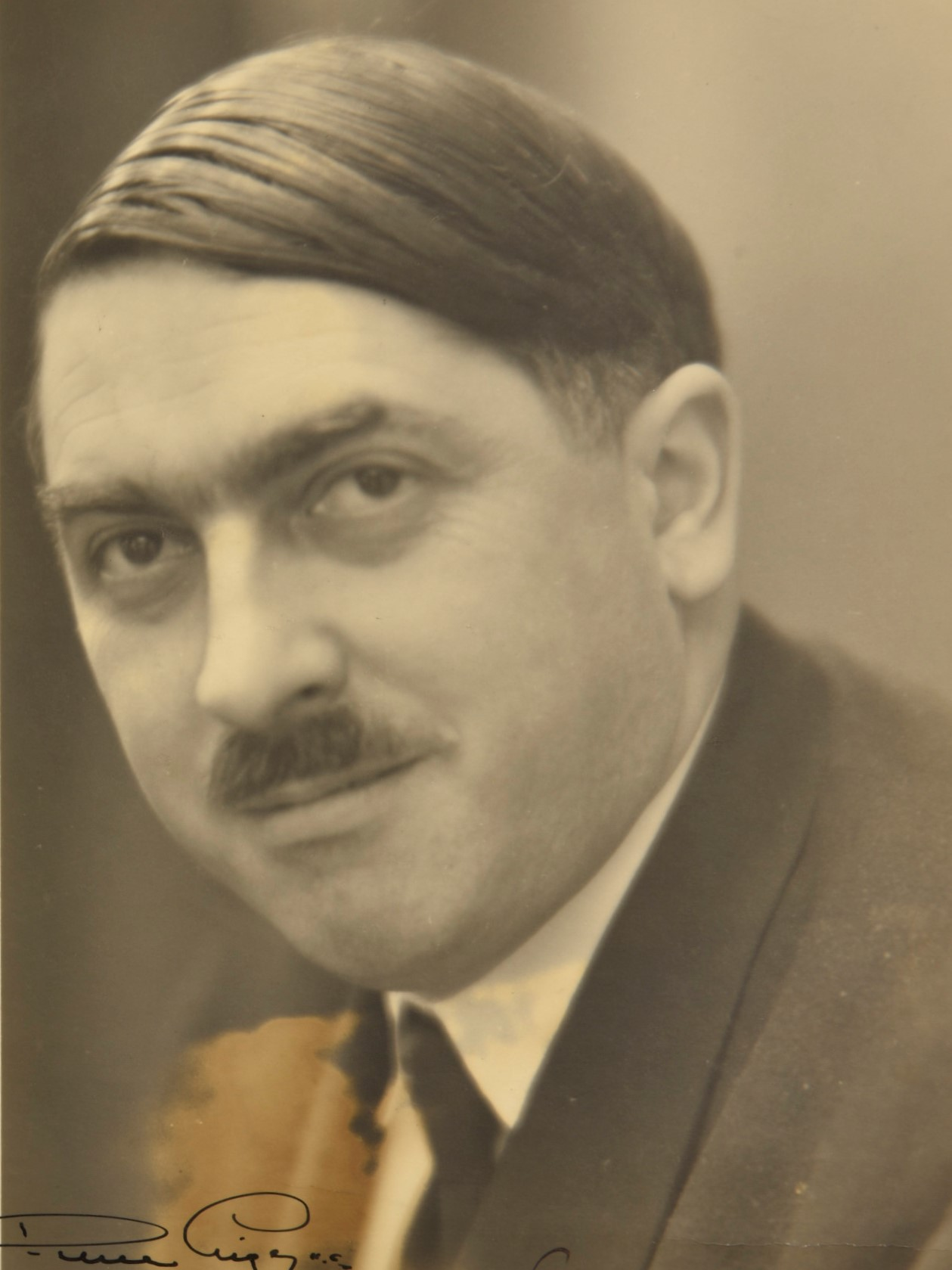
Georges Calzant (1897–1962).

Since Charles Maurras' death on November 16, 1952, several significant texts by him had been published (Saint Pie X, Sauveur de la France, Votre bel aujourd'hui, Maîtres et témoins de ma vie d'esprit, Pascal puni). The team led by Georges Calzant aimed to provide readers with extracts from older works, unpublished writings, studies, and testimonials that complemented the more news-focused weekly Aspects de la France. The journal sought to maintain the influence of one of the most prominent and influential thinkers of his time. The Cahiers Charles Maurras became a "place of worship" for Maurrassians featuring often partisan analyses. The journal, along with L'Ordre Français (since 1956), contributed to "offering new visibility to the ideologues" of the Vichy regime.

After Georges Calzant died on June 28, 1962, the publication was taken over by Pierre Sortais and his wife.

A total of 68 issues were published.

== Contributors ==
- Xavier Vallat
- Louis Frédéric Auphan
- Jacques Ploncard d'Assac
- Henri Massis
- Marie-Madeleine Martin
- Joanny Drevet
- Marie-Aimée de Kermorvan
- Gustave Thibon
- Pierre Gaxotte
- Marcel de Corte
- Gilbert Tournier
- Jean-Marc Varaut
- Michel de Saint Pierre

== Bibliography ==
- Jérôme Cotillon (2003). Ce qu'il reste de Vichy. Armand Collin. p. 84. ISBN 978-2-200-35629-3..
