= Scelle Affair =

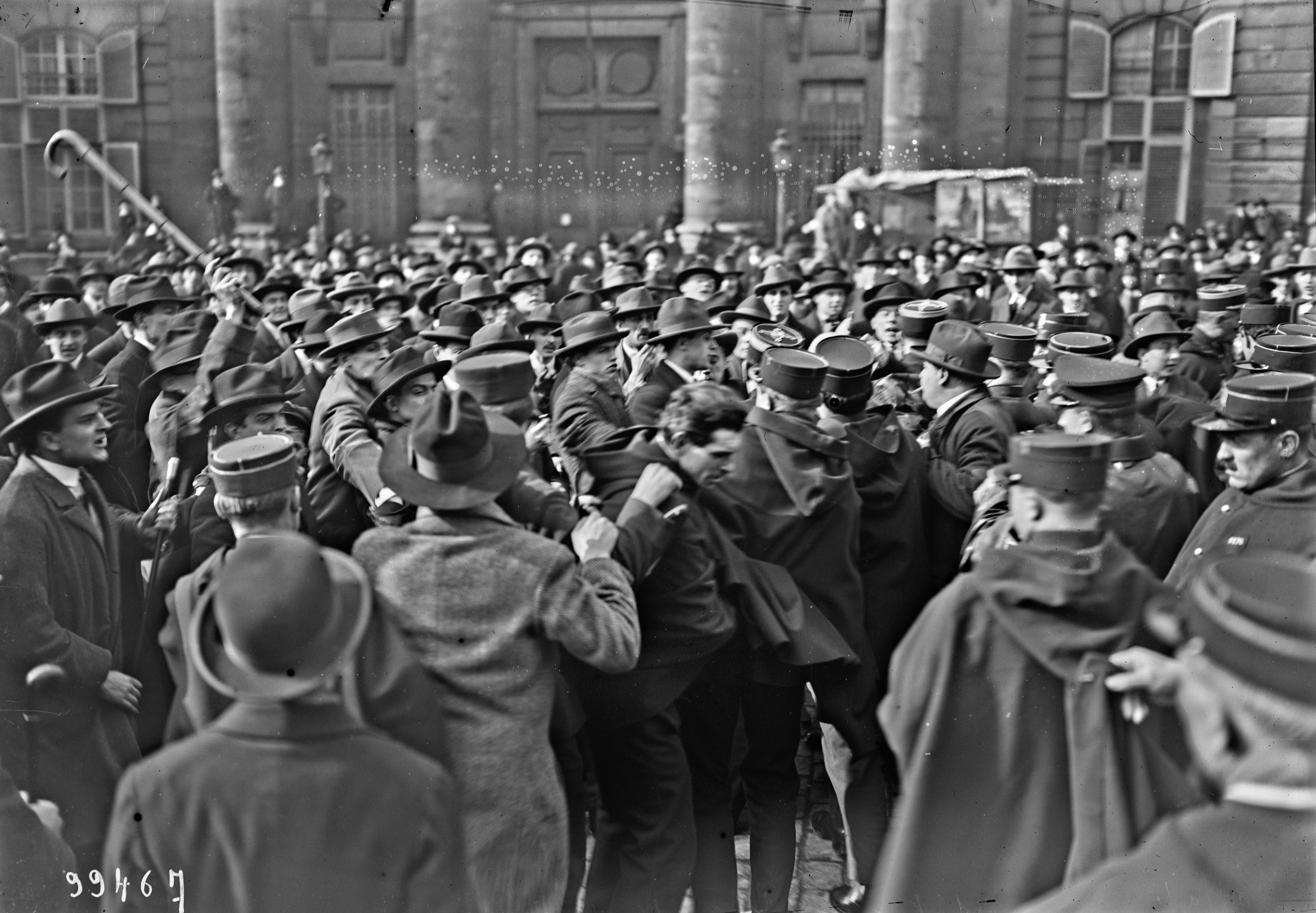
Clashes between students and police outside the Faculty of Law of Paris on March 28, 1925.

The Scelle Affair was a controversy in French education surrounding the appointment of Professor Georges Scelle from the University of Burgundy to a chair at the Faculty of Law of Paris in March 1925.

== History ==
=== February ===
In February 1925, Georges Scelle was proposed to teach a public international law course at the Faculty of Law of Paris. However, he was second to Louis Le Fur, a professor at the Faculty of Law of Rennes, in seniority. The Minister of Public Instruction and Radical François Albert bypassed the usual hierarchy, appointing Scelle by decree contrary to faculty recommendations. This sparked protests from his legal peers and the Action Française Students Federation, who decried favoritism and began demonstrations in the Latin Quarter and beyond. Suspicions arose from Scelle's role as Chief of Staff for the Minister of Labor, Justin Godart, at the time. Gaston Jèze was among the few legal scholars to defend Scelle's promotion.

=== March ===
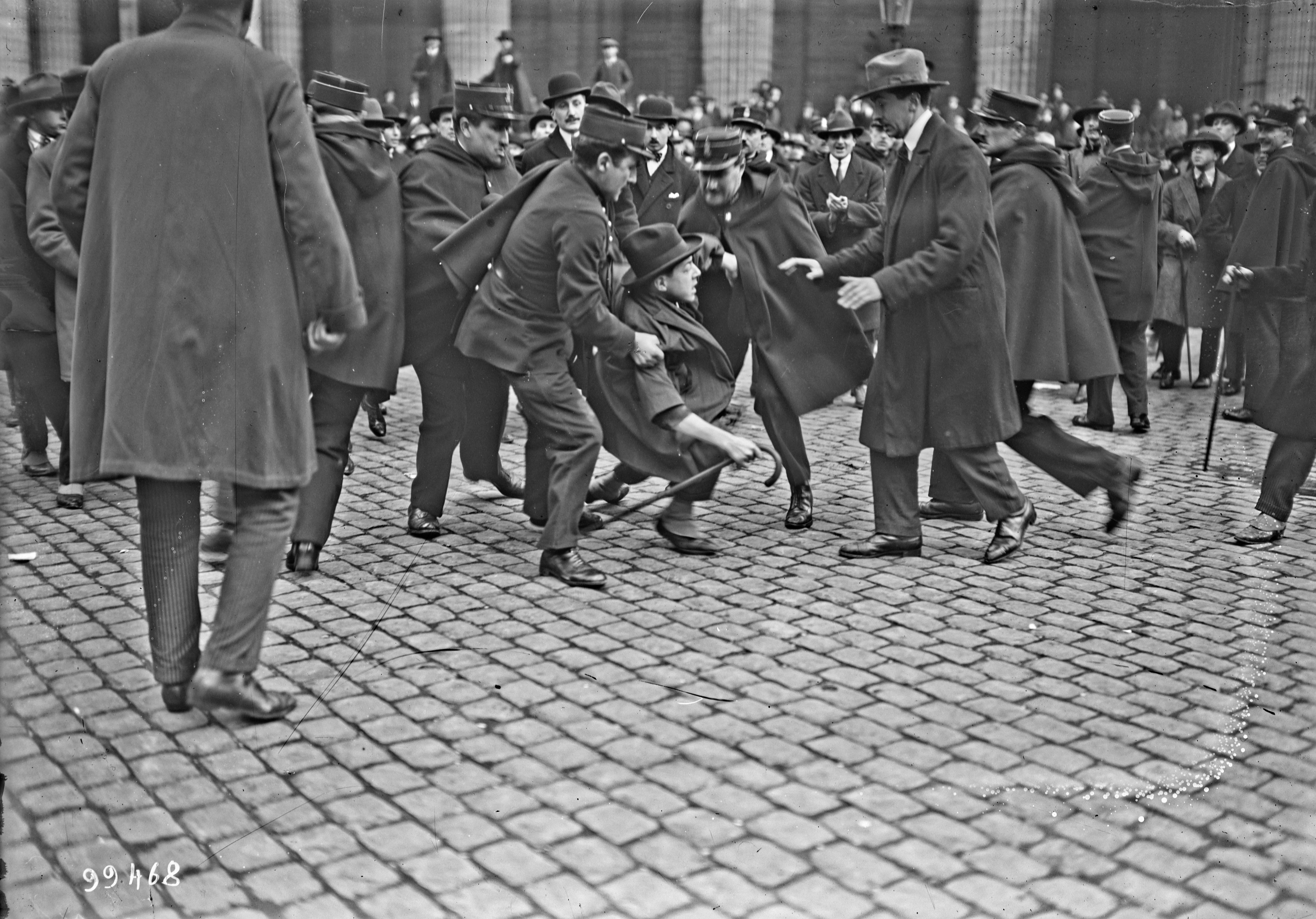
A student being arrested near the Panthéon on March 28, 1925.

On March 9, students disrupted Scelle's inaugural lecture by breaking into the amphitheater and causing disturbances. Clashes between students and police led to the suspension of Scelle's lectures for 20 days.

Despite attempts to reschedule, it was officially announced on March 23 that Scelle's next lecture would occur on March 28.

On March 26, Georges Calzant, Secretary General of the Fédération nationale des étudiants d'Action française, urged his supporters to prevent the lecture at all costs.

On March 28, large-scale protests blocked Scelle's lecture and triggered parliamentary debates in the French National Assembly. Further clashes between students and police ensued.

On March 30, the Minister of Public Instruction suspended Dean Henri Berthélemy and closed the law faculty.

=== April ===
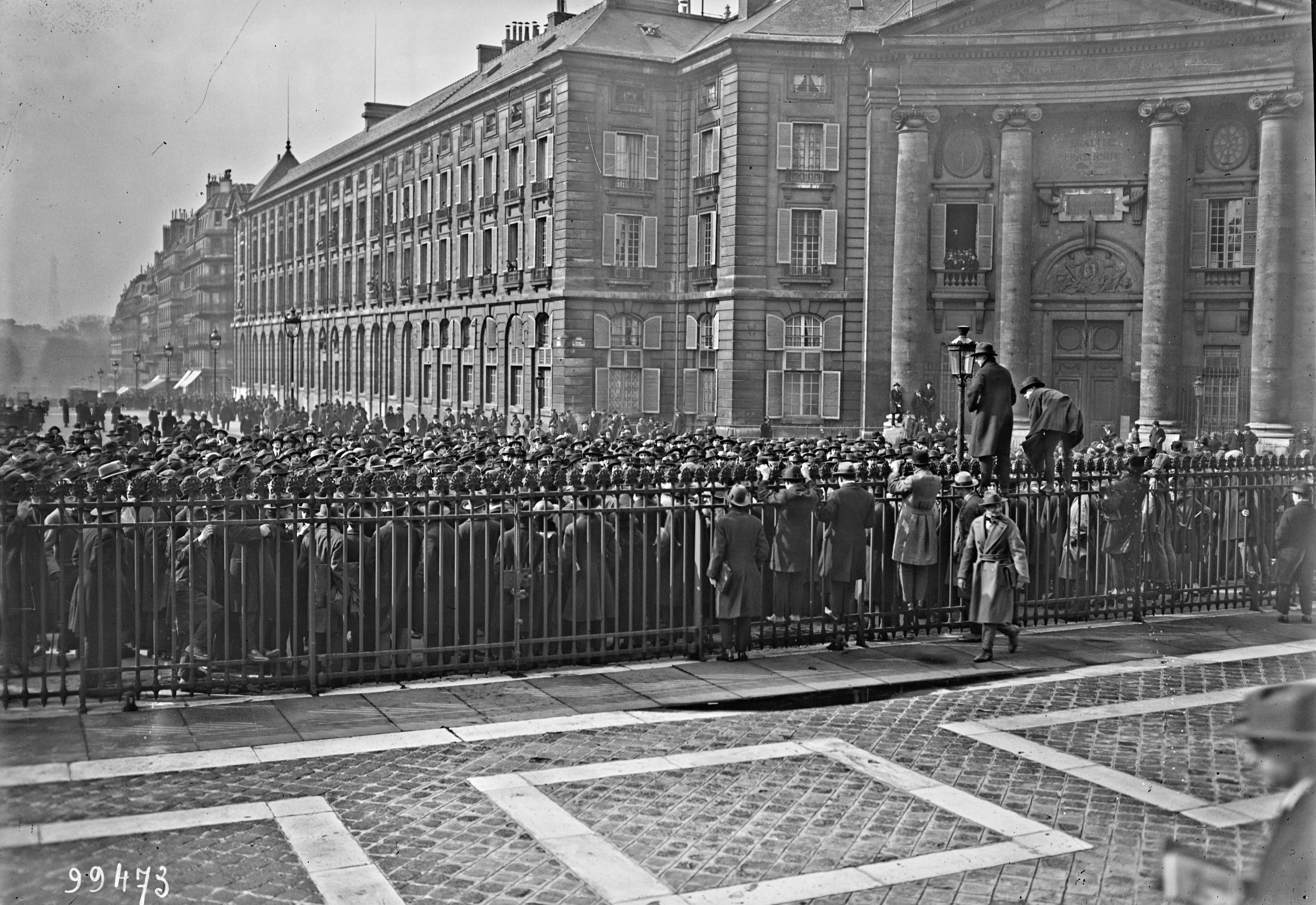
Students demonstrating in front of the Panthéon against Georges Scelle on March 28, 1925.

On April 3, 15,000 students protested in the Latin Quarter. The student strike spread to cities including Lyon, Bordeaux, Toulouse, Marseille, Rouen, Rennes, Montpellier, Nantes, Limoges, Strasbourg, Poitiers, Grenoble, Algiers, Clermont-Ferrand, Angers, Lille, and Nancy.

In response to mounting pressure from student associations, Scelle was dismissed on April 11, 1925. Louis Le Fur was ultimately appointed on July 10, 1925.

On April 20, the faculty reopened, and the dean was greeted with acclaim.

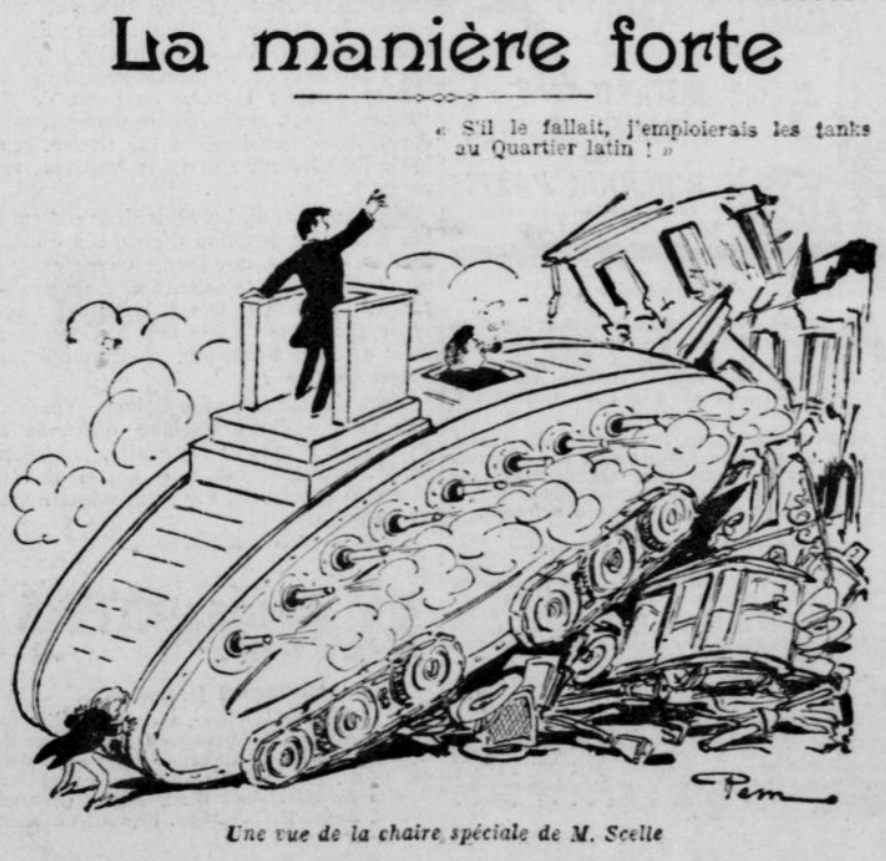
Caricature of Georges Scelle by Pem in La Liberté, April 8, 1925.

== Bibliography ==
- Jean-François Sirinelli (2014-04-01). Génération intellectuelle: Khâgneux et Normaliens dans l'entre-deux-guerres (in French). Fayard. pp. 229–237. ISBN 978-2-213-65368-6.
- Julliard, Jacques; Winock, Michel (1996). Dictionnaire des intellectuels français: les personnes, les lieux, les moments (in French). Editions du Seuil. pp. 1034–1035. ISBN 978-0-202-01833-1.
- Marc Milet (1996). La Faculté de droit de Paris face à la vie politique, de l'affaire Scelle à l'affaire Jèze, 1925–1936 (in French). L.G.D.J. ISBN 978-2-275-01505-7.
