= Jacques Gondouin =

French architect (1737–1818)

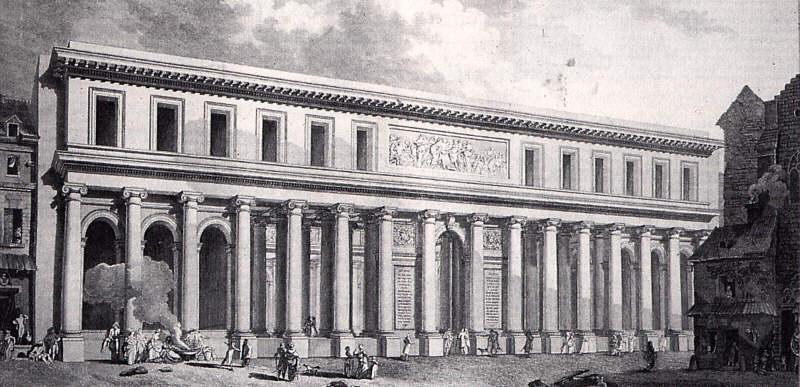
École de Chirurgie, façade on the street.

Jacques Gondouin de Folleville, or simply Gondouin (7 June 1737 – 29 December 1818) was a French architect and designer.

He was born in Saint-Ouen, Seine-Saint-Denis, the son of a gardener at the château de Choisy.

He died in Paris, aged 81.

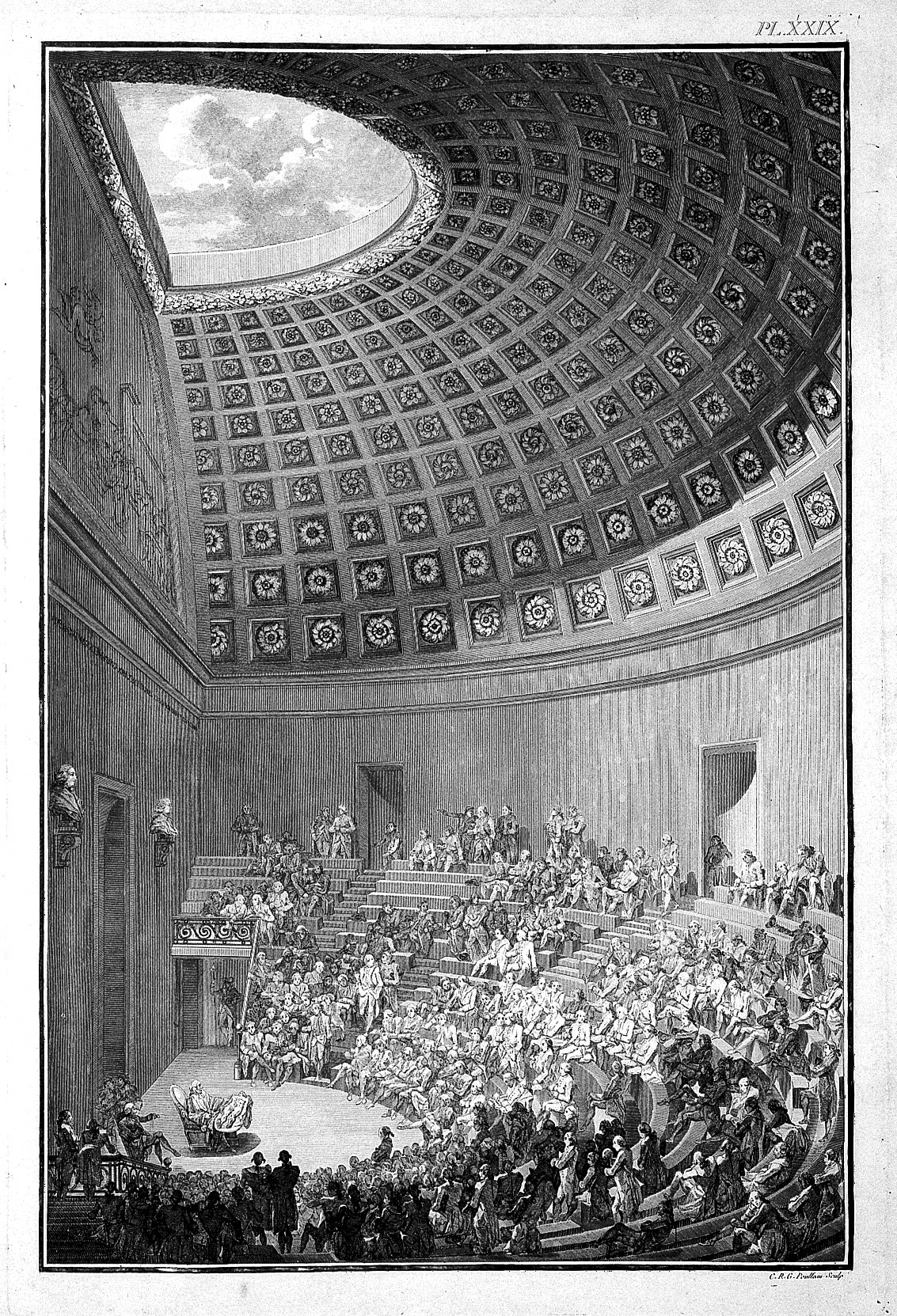
École de Chirurgie, lecture hall.

== Main projects ==
- High altar, cathédrale de Noyon (1777–1779)

=== Paris ===
- École de Chirurgie, today the Faculté de Médecine, rue de l’École de Médecine, (1771–1786).
- Interior decor at the Hôtel du Garde-Meuble (also known as Hôtel de la Marine), Place de la Concorde, 1775.
- Colonne Vendôme to the glory of the Grande Armée, Place Vendôme, 1806–1810.

== Works ==
- (in French) Description des Écoles de Chirurgie, Paris, Pierres, Cellot et Jombert, 1780, gr. in-folio de 18 pp.ch., 1 f.n.ch., 1 front. par Gibelin et 30 pl. la plupart dépl. par C.R.G. Poulleau. Tiré à 100 ex. sur papier fort à l'occasion de l'inauguration de l'École de Chirurgie.

== Bibliography ==
- Christian Baulez, "Le projet d'installation de Napoléon à Versailles. De Gondoin à Fontaine", Versalia, n° 9, mars 2006, pp. 14–22.
- D. Bilodeau, "Types et historicisme : l'École de Chirurgie de Jacques Gondoin et l'émergence d'une conception généalogique de l'architecture en France au XVIIIe siècle" in L'Architecture, les sciences et la culture de l'histoire au XIXe siècle en France, Les Entretiens Jacques-Cartier, December 1997, Publication de l'Université de Saint-Étienne. pp 131–144.
- Géraldine Defives, Recherches sur l'architecte Jacques Gondoin (1737–1818), Maîtrise d'histoire de l'art, Université Paris X-Nanterre, 1996, 2 vol. dactylographiés.
- Jean-Jacques Gautier, "Jacques Gondouin, architecte et dessinateur du Garde-Meuble de la Couronne", L'Estampille, November 1992, n° 263, pp. 58–66.
- M. Plouvier, "Jacques Gondoin et le maître autel de la cathédrale de Noyon", Société archéologique, historique et scientifique de Noyon, Comptes rendus et mémoires, 1990, vol. 36, p. 201–223.
