= Cordeliers Convent, Paris =

University in Paris, France

Cordeliers Convent Campus The Practical School
- Campus of the universities of Paris
- Les Cordeliers; École Pratique de la Faculté de Médecine
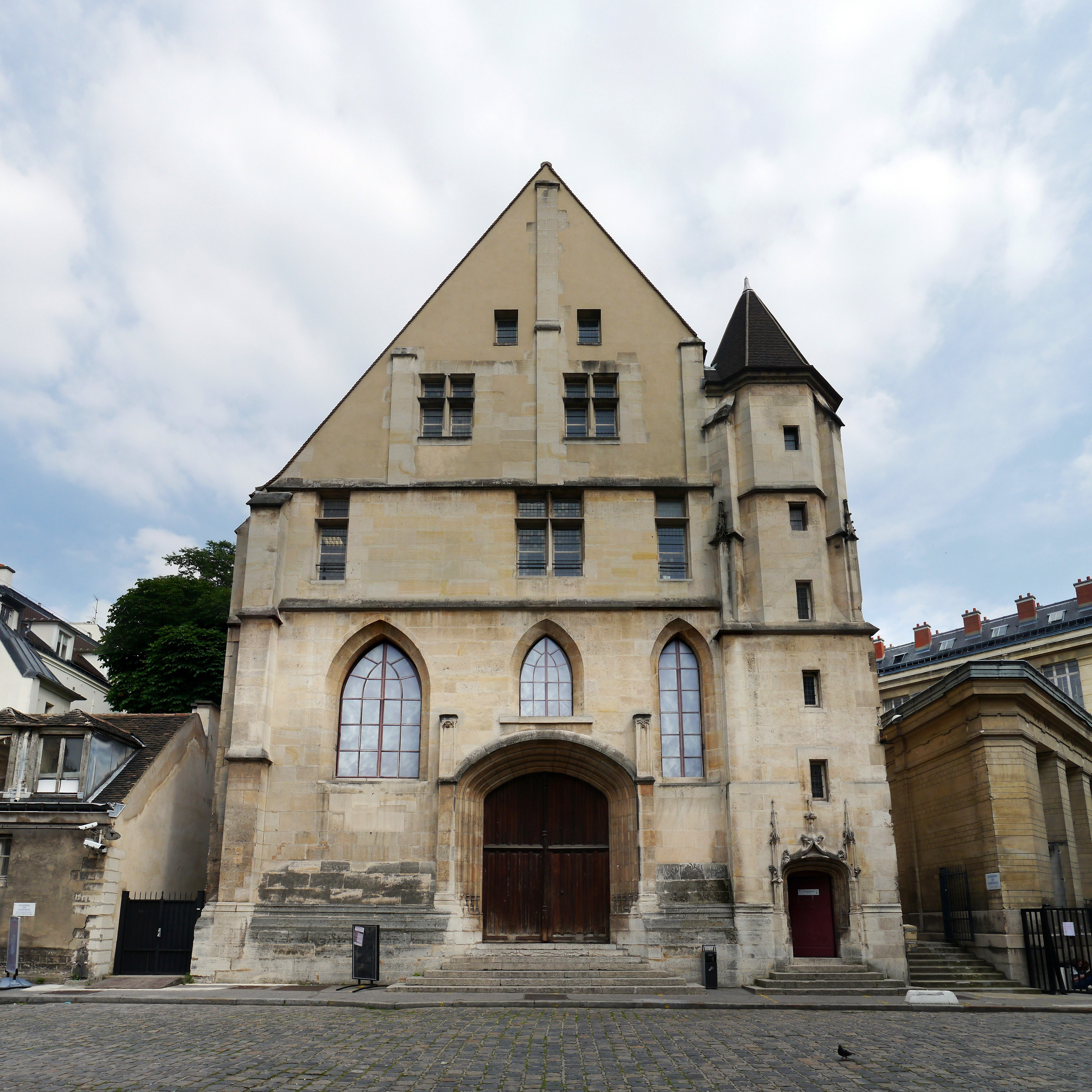
- The refectory, the only remaining part of the convent, photographed in 2012. It is now classified as a monument historique.
- Interactive map of Cordeliers Convent Campus; The Practical School
- Country: France
- Region: Île-de-France
- Ville: Paris
- Arrondissement: 6th
- Part of: City of Paris
- Boroughs: Host: Paris Cité University and Sorbonne University

The Cordeliers Convent in Paris (in French: "Les Cordeliers", or "l'École Pratique de la Faculté de Médecine de Paris", in English: the Practical School of the Paris Faculty of Medicine) is a university and historic site in the 6th arrondissement of Paris, located in the Latin Quarter campus at 15, rue de l'École-de-Médecine. It takes its name from the former Cordeliers Convent, a monastic establishment founded thanks to the generosity of King Louis IX and part of the Franciscan order. Today, only the convent refectory remains of the original building, recently restored by the RIVP. The owner of the site is the City of Paris.

During the French Revolution, the Cordeliers convent became the headquarters of Danton and Desmoulins' Club des Cordeliers. Under the French Empire, it became the headquarters of the Practical School of the Paris Faculty of Medicine, which is located across the street, in the École de Médecine building.

The Cordeliers Convent is now home to :

- the Faculty of Health of Paris Cité University and its Medical School, one of the two successors to the Paris Faculty of Medicine;
- the Sorbonne University Faculty of Health Sciences (formerly UPMC), including the 3rd cycle medical school, the Cordeliers Research Centre (CRC), and the services of the Presidency of Sorbonne University in the cloister;
- the Sorbonne University's Dupuytren Museum, until 2016.

== Gallery ==
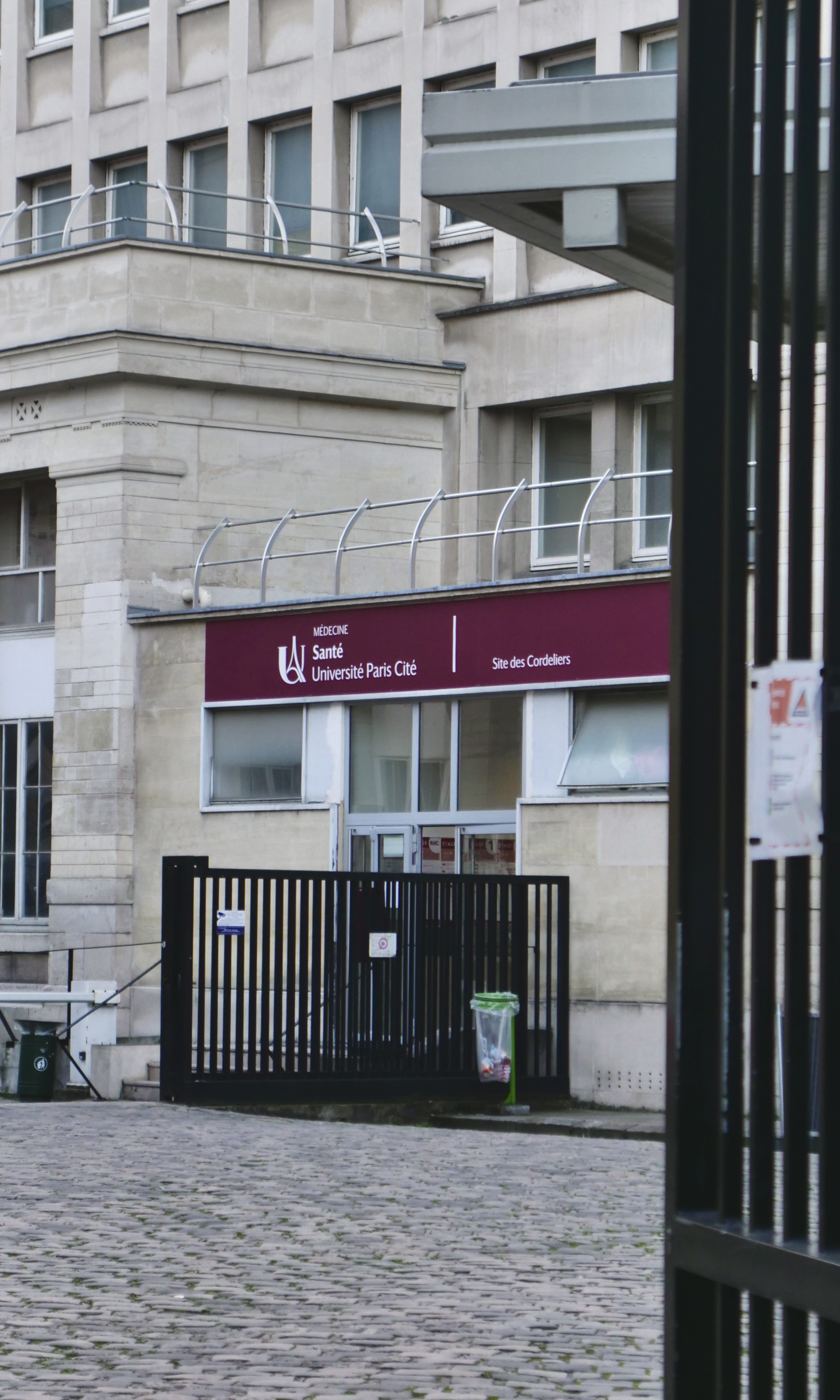
The headquarters of the Medical School (UFR de médecine) of Paris Cité University Faculty of Health in the Cordeliers Convent, in October 2024.

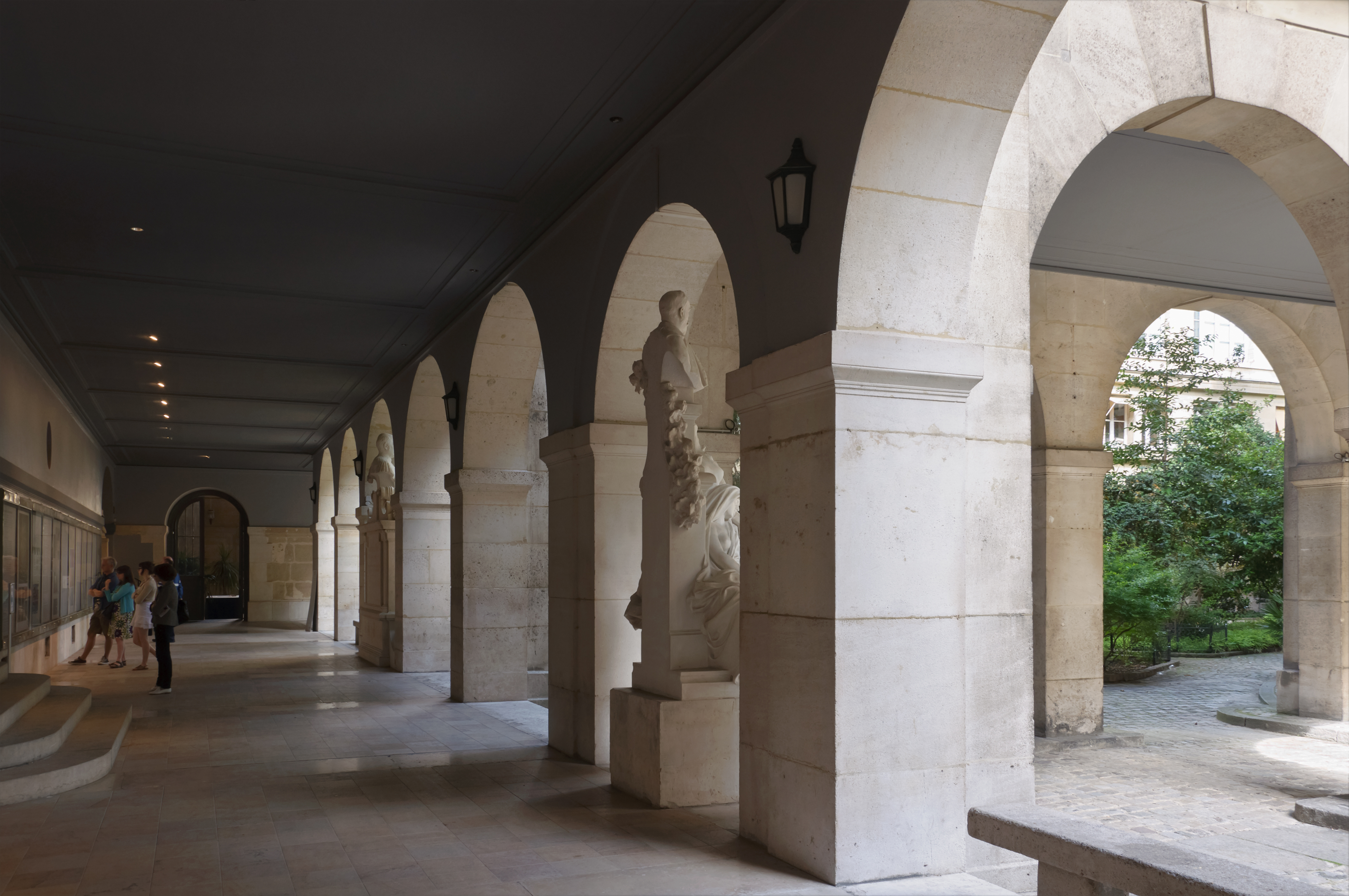
The cloister of the Cordeliers Campus, administered by Sorbonne University.

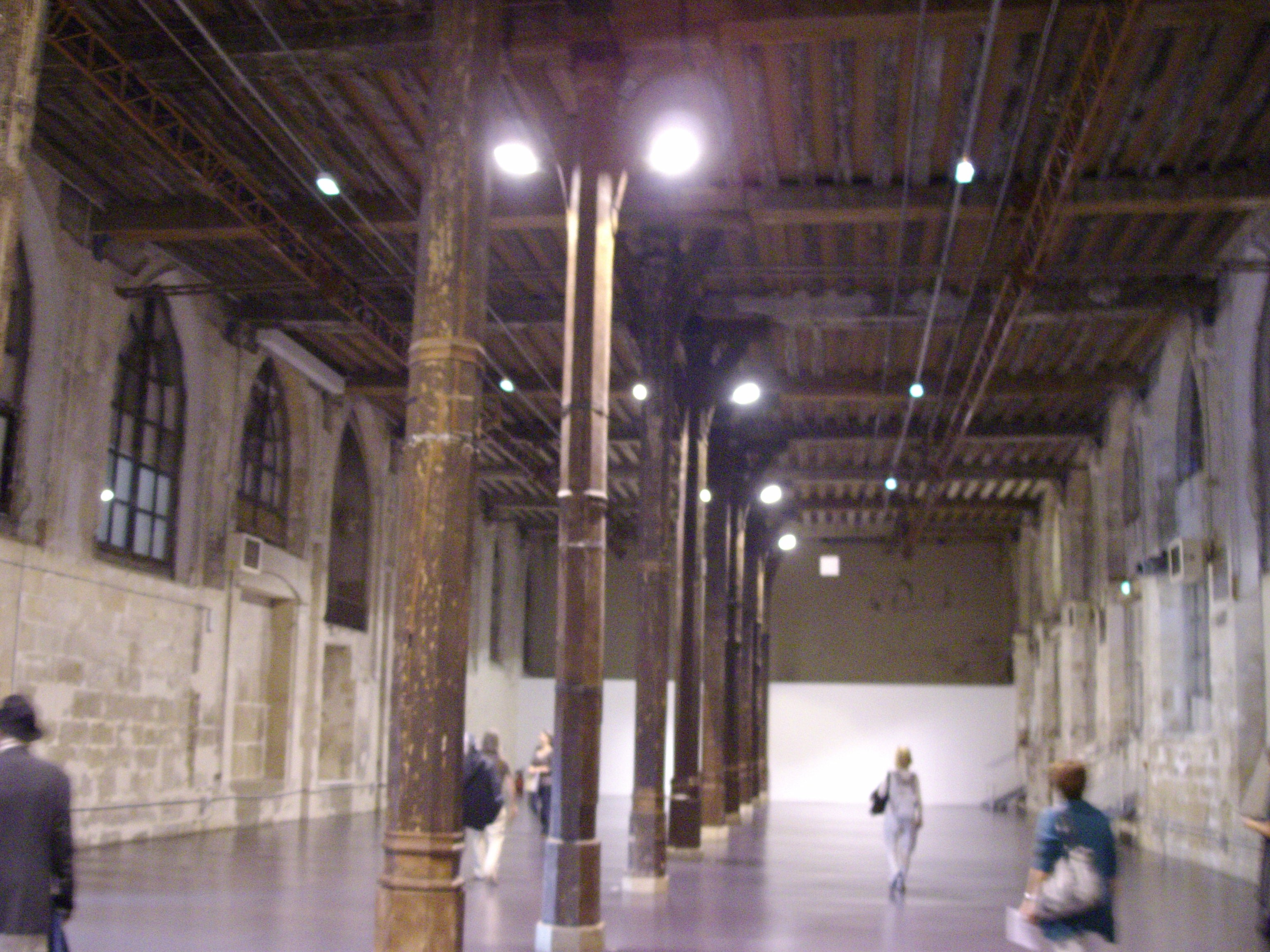
The interior of the convent's former refectory, managed by the City of Paris.

== Bibliography ==
- Beaumont-Maillet Laure, "Le grand couvent des Cordeliers de Paris", dans Annuaires de l'École pratique des hautes études 1973, 1973, p. 757-766
