= Votre bel aujourd'hui =

Your Glorious Today
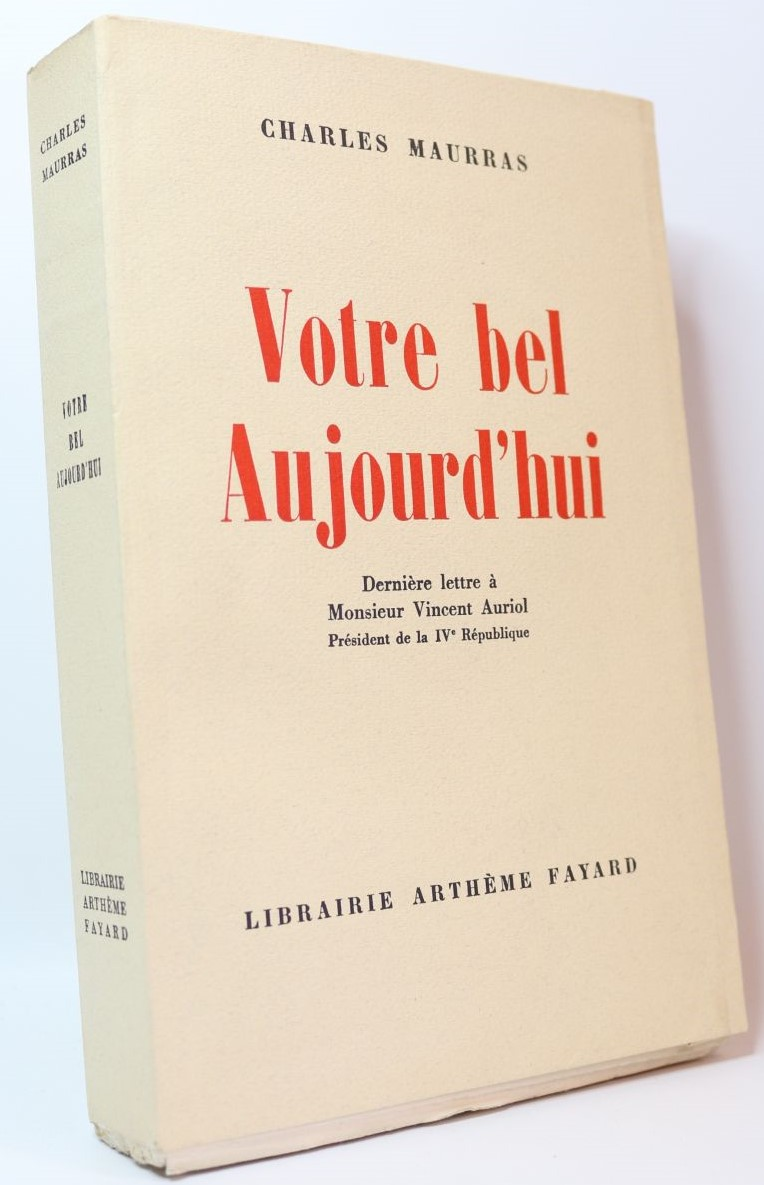
- First edition.
- Author: Charles Maurras
- Genre: Politics
- Published: Paris
- Publisher: Fayard
- Publication date: 1953
- Publication place: France
- Pages: 491
- Preceded by: La Prière de la fin

Votre bel aujourd'hui (Your Glorious Today: Last Letter to Monsieur Vincent Auriol, President of the IV° Republic) is a posthumous book by the French journalist and politician Charles Maurras published in 1953. The work serves as a rebuttal to the book Yesterday and Tomorrow, written by President of the Republic Vincent Auriol and published in 1944.

== Overview ==
=== Context ===
Following the Hiroshima bombing, Charles Maurras began drafting an extended letter addressed to Vincent Auriol in response to his 1944 book Yesterday and Tomorrow, which analyzed the events leading to the military disaster of 1940 and proposed post-war projects. Maurras vigorously refuted Auriol's work point by point. The text was completed in April 1950 while Maurras was incarcerated at Clairvaux Prison and published in 1953, one year after his death.

=== Analysis ===
Historian Martin Motte explains that Maurras focused on three major challenges in the post-Second World War era.

First, Maurras criticized moves for European unification: {{Blockquote|The Europe people talk about does not exist. Or no longer exists. Or not yet. Or not at all. It lacks the unity that draws being from nothingness. Do you want to give it that unity? Go ahead! But do not pretend it is already done.|reference= Maurras dismissed calls for European unity as disguises for national ambitions, pointing to Nazi Germany in 1940–1944 and Great Britain, which, despite advocating a European federation, was resolute in "sacrificing none of its sovereignty nor the nationalism underpinning it".

Second, Maurras opposed Franco-German unity, interpreting it as "a German ruse to achieve peacefully the expansionist aims it failed to impose by force". He argued that demographic disparities would allow fifteen million Germans to overwhelm France. Although this reasoning is flawed, historian Martin Motte notes that Maurras accurately foresaw a potential informal domination by Germany, transforming Europe into a "new Holy Roman Empire", leaving France as a mere "satellite".

Third, Maurras discussed the issue of nuclear weapons, calling them a "dreadful device". He deemed it crucial for France to acquire nuclear capability and prevent its misuse by "fanatical sects". He even proposed testing such weapons in "African and Oceanic solitudes", predicting French nuclear tests in Reggane and Moruroa.

In conclusion, Maurras implored Vincent Auriol to champion the restoration of the monarchy and prepare for the accession of the Count of Paris to the French throne. According to Pierre Pujo, the book exemplifies empiricism of organization.

Despite the Final Solution and the creation of Israel, Maurras continued advocating Antisémitisme d'État in Your Glorious Today, calling for civic exclusion of Jews.
