= Georges Calzant =

Georges Calzant Lawyer
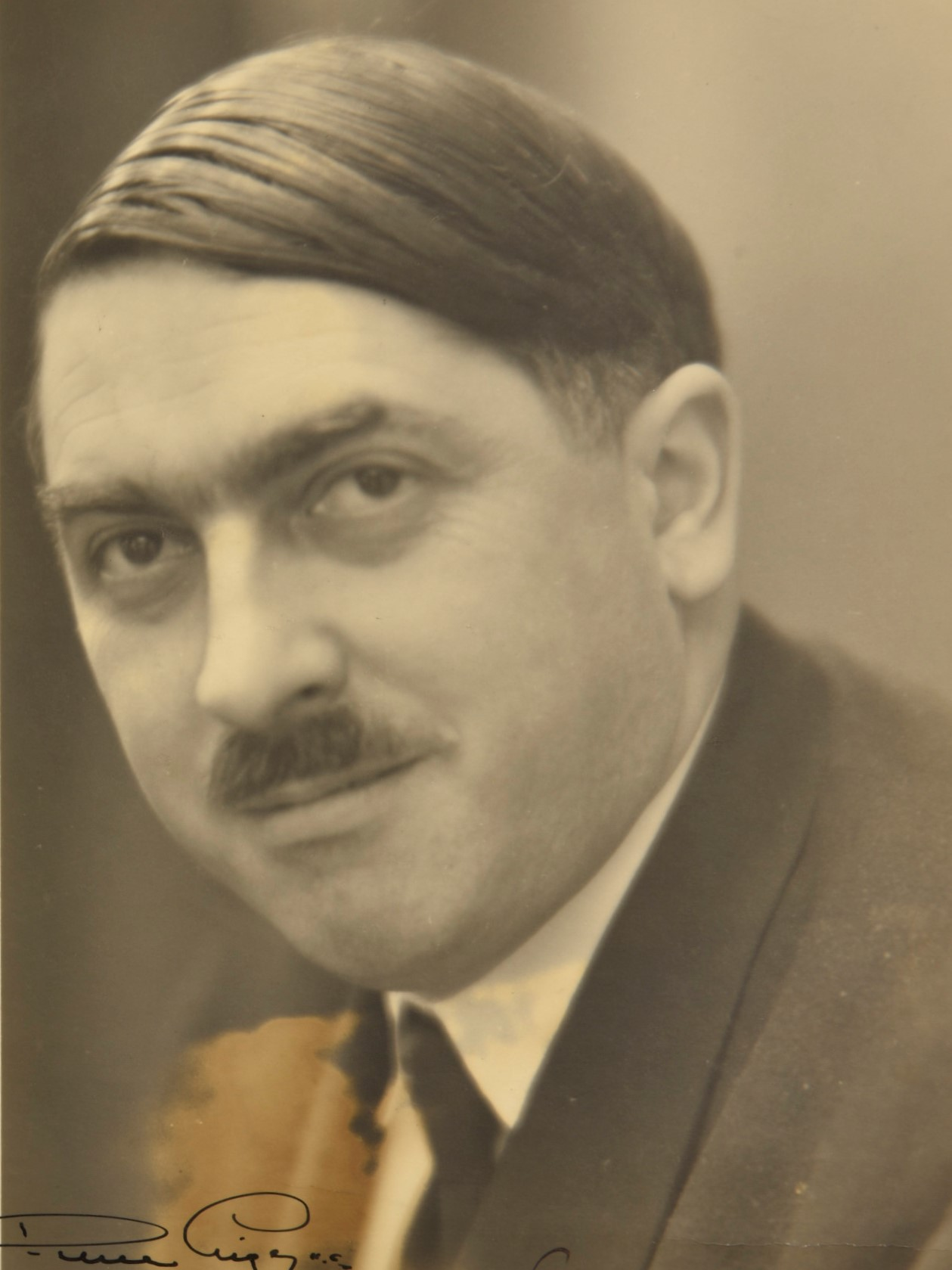
- Spouse: Marguerite Lemoine
- Awards: Croix de guerre 1914-1918

Georges Calzant (born September 24, 1897, in Saint-Martin-le-Beau, died June 28, 1962, in Issy-les-Moulineaux) was a lawyer, journalist, and royalist activist affiliated with the Action Française movement.

== Biography ==
=== Early life ===
Calzant was the son of two teachers, Ernest Calzant and Héloïse Gatien. His classmate Pierre de Cossé Brissac introduced him to the works of L'Action française during his studies at the Lycée Descartes in Tours. After completing his education, Calzant enlisted on August 2, 1914. He was awarded the Croix de guerre and suffered injuries during World War I.

=== Early Career at Action Française ===
After the war, Calzant earned a law degree and an advanced economics diploma from the École libre des sciences politiques. He joined the bar in 1921 and became involved with the Fédération nationale des étudiants d'Action française, serving as its secretary in 1924.

=== Interwar Activities ===
During the Scelle Affair in 1925, Calzant led student protests against international law professor Georges Scelle, culminating in Scelle's resignation on April 11, 1925. Calzant also disrupted socialist and pacifist gatherings, leading to notable altercations.

In the 1930s, Calzant became a prominent Action Française leader, collaborating on legal cases and managing campaigns. He was secretary general of the Fédération nationale des Camelots du roi from 1932 to 1936.

Despite his active role, Calzant was criticized for his leadership style and perceived ineffectiveness. Dissatisfaction among members was formalized in a memorandum submitted in 1935.

=== World War II and Occupation ===
During the Occupation of France, Calzant relocated to Lyon with Charles Maurras, where they supported the Vichy regime through publications. He reportedly served as an intermediary between Maurras and Marshal Philippe Pétain, conveying criticism of Pierre Laval and Nazi policies. In 1944, he was arrested by the Gestapo and imprisoned at Montluc Prison until July.

=== Postwar Activities ===
With the dissolution of L'Action française post-Liberation, Calzant founded Aspects de la France in 1947 to uphold Maurrassism and monarchist ideals. He also launched the Cahiers Charles Maurras, a quarterly review he directed for 15 years.

Calzant died on June 28, 1962, at a surgical clinic in Issy-les-Moulineaux.

== Personal life ==
Calzant married painter Marguerite Lemoine on October 16, 1929.

== Honors ==
- Croix de guerre 1914-1918

== Archives ==
Personal papers are preserved at the Archives Nationales in Pierrefitte-sur-Seine under code 596AP. View the inventory
