= École de Médecine (building) =

The Medical School Building Paris Cité University Head Office
- École de Médecine; Faculté de Médecine, Siège de l'Université Paris Cité
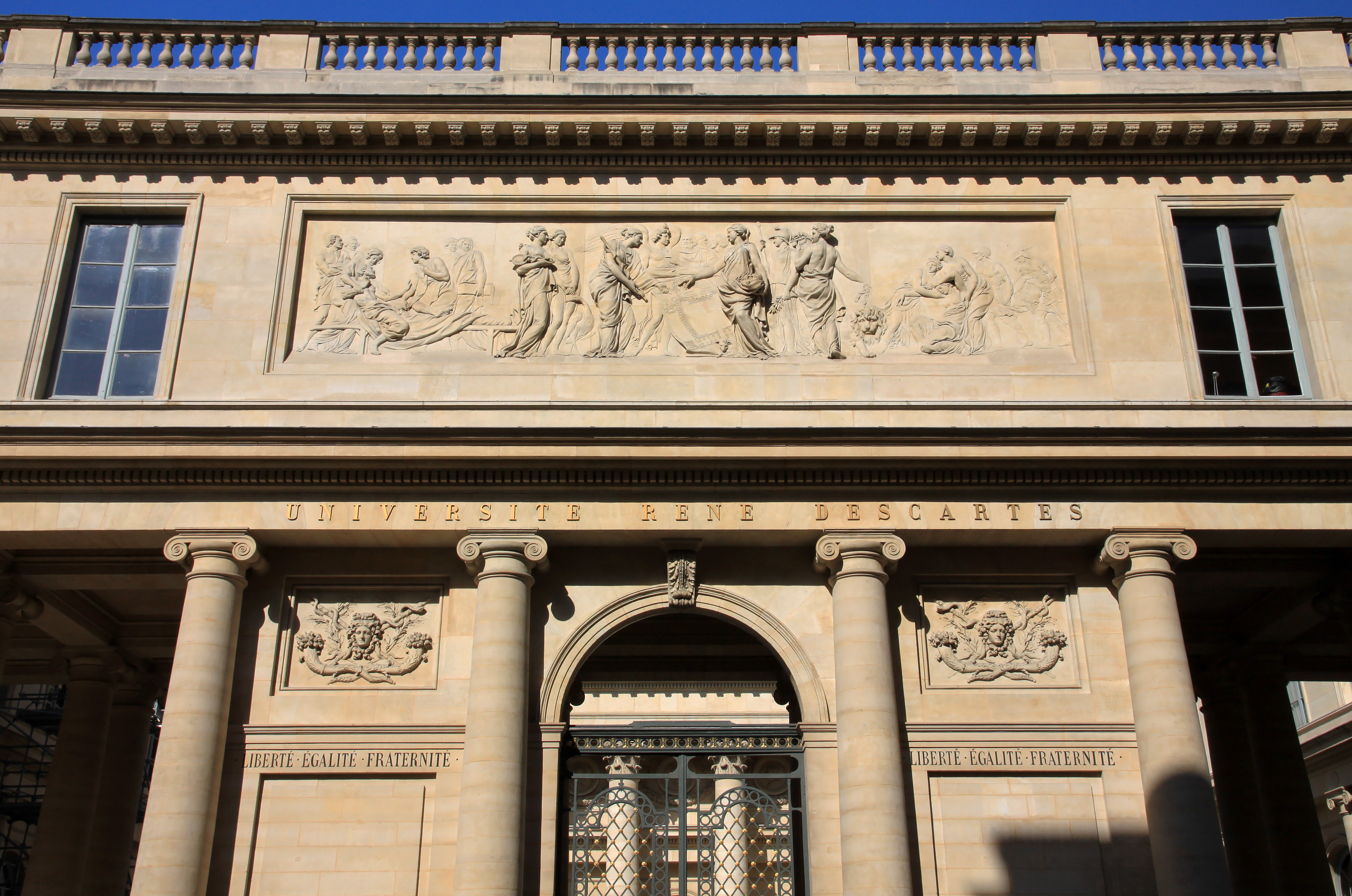
- The facade of the École de Médecine (or École de Chirurgie), seen from the street.

- Location within Paris
- Former names: Académie Royale de Chirurgie
- Alternative names: École de Chirurgie or Faculté de Médecine de Paris

General information
- Type: Academic
- Architectural style: English Palladian style
- Location: 12, Rue de l'École-de-Médecine, Paris
- Coordinates: 48.8516°N 2.3409°E
- Construction started: 1769
- Completed: 1774
- Owner: Paris Cité University

Design and construction
- Architect: Jacques Gondouin

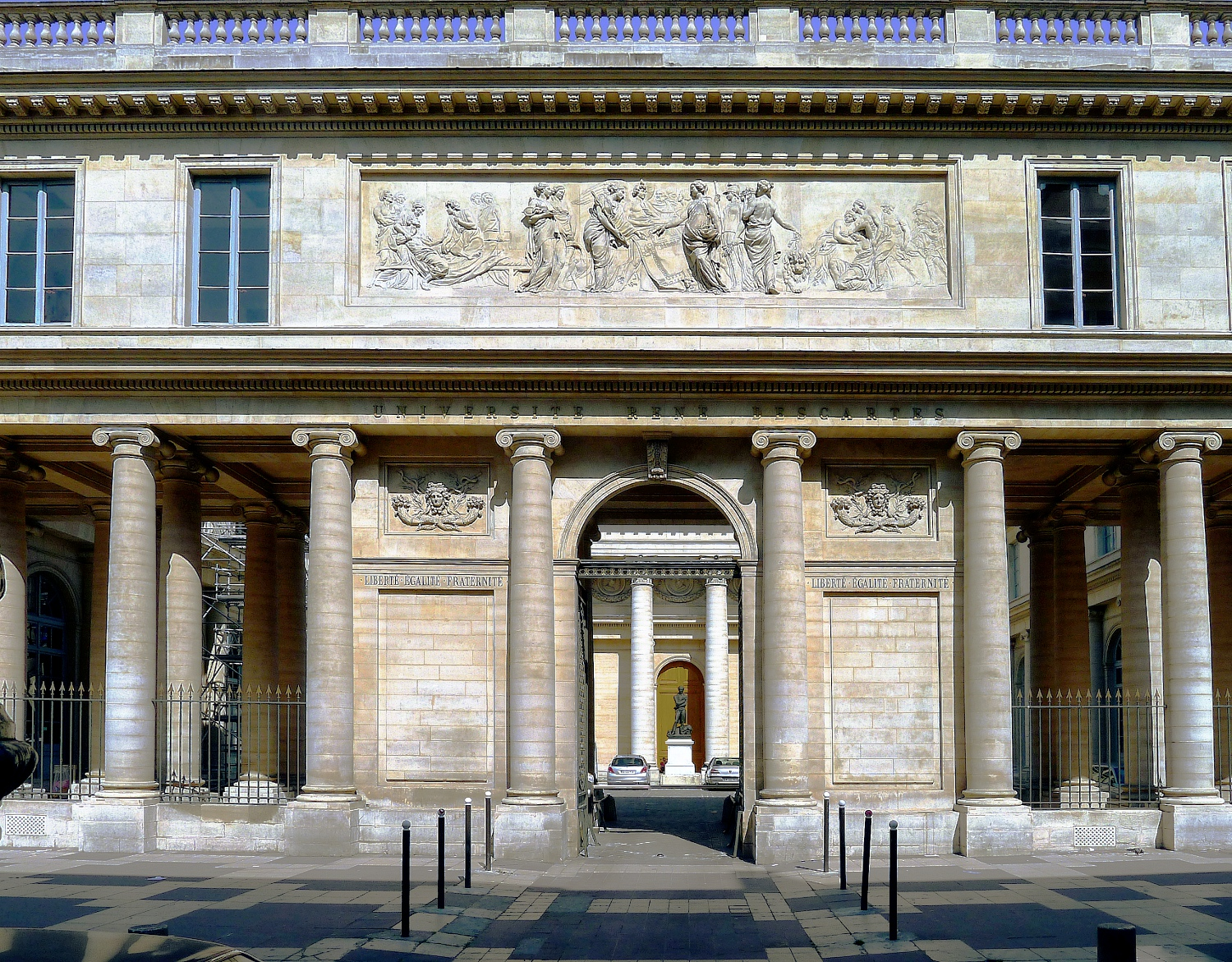
The façade of the École de Chirurgie, facing the street.

The École de Médecine (French pronunciation: [ekɔl də medəsin], "School of Medicine"), or formerly the École de Chirurgie ([-ʃiʁyʁʒi], "Academy of Surgery"), is an academic and historic building of the Paris Cité University, located on the Latin Quarter campus, at 10–12 rue de l'École-de-Médecine in the 6th arrondissement of Paris. The building was the headquarters and main campus of the Faculty of Medicine of Paris from 1795 to 1971. Today it is the head office of the Paris Cité University.

The building gave its name to the current rue de l'École-de-Médecine, formerly rue des Cordeliers.

== Background ==
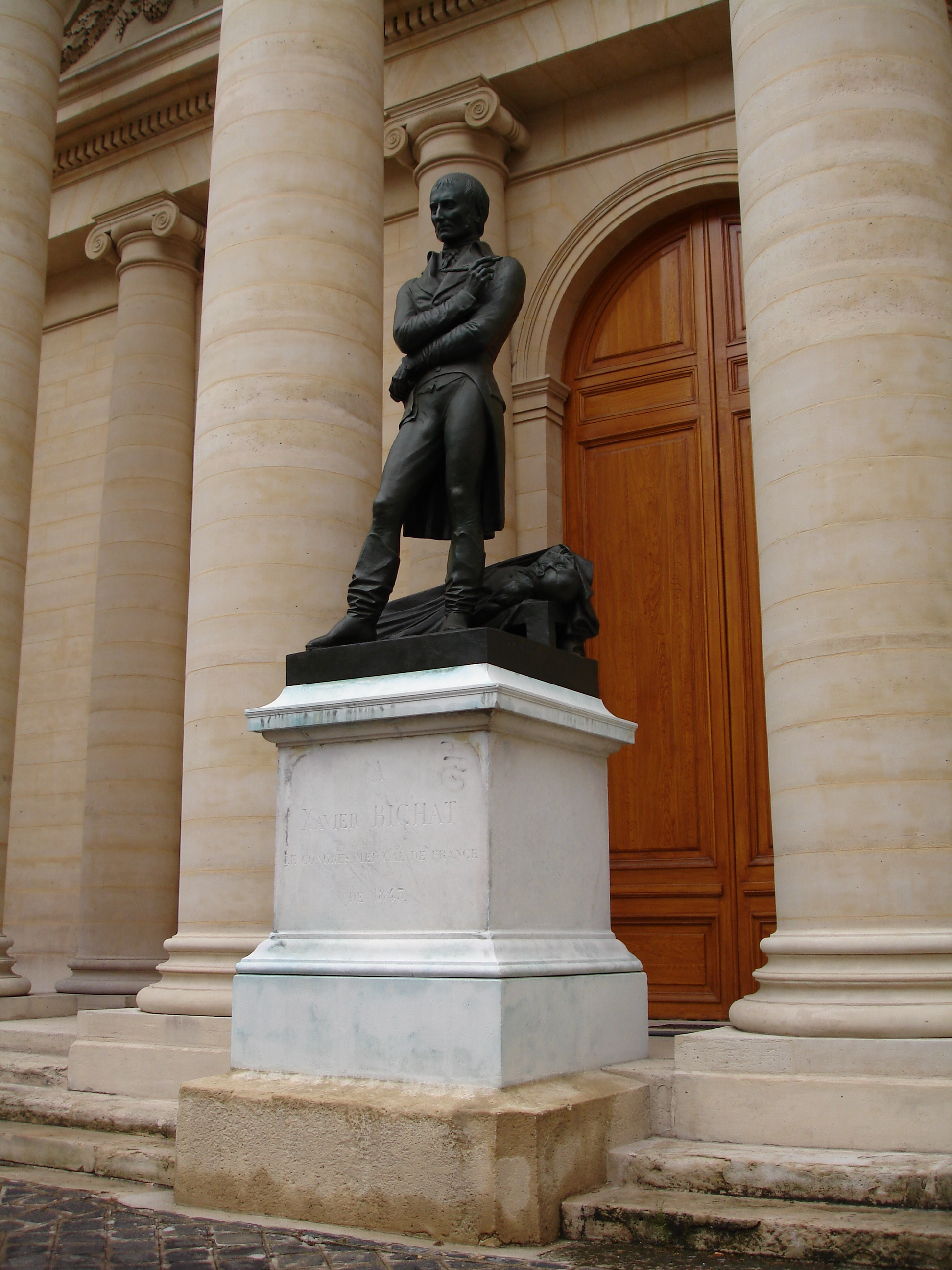
David d'Angers' statue of Xavier Bichat in the courtyard

In the 18th century, surgery was increasingly recognized as a specialized discipline in the medical sciences, while previously surgeons had often been confused with barbers. Consequently, an independent academy for surgery was established in 1731 and ratified in 1750. In 1769, King Louis XV, perhaps out of respect for his Premier Chirurgien (principal surgeon), Germain Pichault de la Martinière, acquired the buildings of the former Collège de Bourgogne (1331–1763), which had been merged with several others into the Collège Louis-le-Grand, and granted them to the Royal Academy of Surgery (French: Académie royale de chirurgie) which until then had been located across the street. The new building was designed by the architect Jacques Gondouin from 1769 to 1774, and built from 1774 to 1786 even though the inaugural session was held as early as 25 April 1775.

== Architecture ==
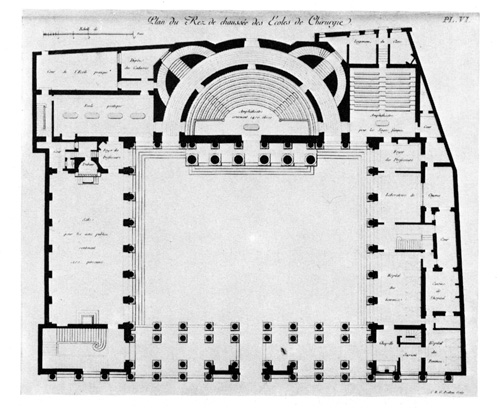
Floor plan

The ground floor housed a rectangular theatre for the instruction of midwives, a chemistry lab, a public hall, a room reserved for students in training for the army, and a small hospital. The second level housed a library for displaying medical instruments, several lecture rooms, and offices. Gondoin's original plan for the forecourt also included a civil prison that would have supplied corpses, yet it was never built. The most important section of the complex was the hemispherical amphitheatre located at the rear. The school is a prime example of neo-classical architecture in France inspired by Gondoin's second visit to Italy. It is Gondoin's only known work in architecture.

Gondoin wrote about the building that it "a monument of the beneficence of the King...which should have the character of magnificence relative to its function; a school whose fame attracts a great concourse of Pupils from all nations should appear open and easy of access. The absolute necessity of columns to fulfill these two objects, is alone sufficient to protect me from the reproach of having multiplied them unduly." Ecole de Médecine changed the hôtel typology by building in the style for a public building versus a private house. Three wings surround a court acting as circulation for the entire building. Situated on an irregular plot, the Ecole is able to appear symmetrical. Gondoin placed a screen of Ionic columns along the facades of both the walls facing the court and the street. A plain frieze rests directly upon the column capitals. Above the main entry arch, lying between the entablature and the upper cornice on the street façade is an Ionic relief panel, designed by Pierre-François Berruer. The relief panel depicts the muse of architecture giving a scroll of the building plan to the god of medicine. The hemispherical anatomy theatre is at the rear. It is signified by the exterior by a Corinthian portico featuring freestanding columns. As a purely symbolic temple front, entrance occurs from the sides. Modeled after the Pantheon, it is lit by an oculus. A coffered ceiling drapes over the main stage and seating for 1200 spectators including the public, not just students. The people of the time saw surgery as a progressive movement and wanted to be a part of it. A semicircular lunette above the main doorway shows portraits of famous predecessors including Le Martinière along with paintings showing the King encouraging their progress and the gods engaged in transmitting the principles of anatomy.

== Later developments ==
A new wing was built on the rear of Gondoin's building, bordering the Boulevard Saint-Germain with a monumental façade designed by architect Léon Ginain and constructed between 1879 and 1900.

It hosted the central offices of the Faculty of Medicine of Paris, including a ceremonial assembly room, a large library, a museum, and archival space. The ornate portal at 83, boulevard Saint-Germain is flanked by two larger-than-life caryatids sculpted by Gustave Crauck. The figure on the left is generally referred to as representing Medicine, even though the attribute she holds in her right hand is a mirror and snake, traditionally associated with Prudentia, and not a caduceus as occasionally described. The figure on the right is an allegory of Surgery, recognizable by her saw and knife.

The building is currently a part of the Paris Cité University (former University of Paris Descartes) focusing on the medical and social sciences. The university is public and enrolls over 30,000 students.

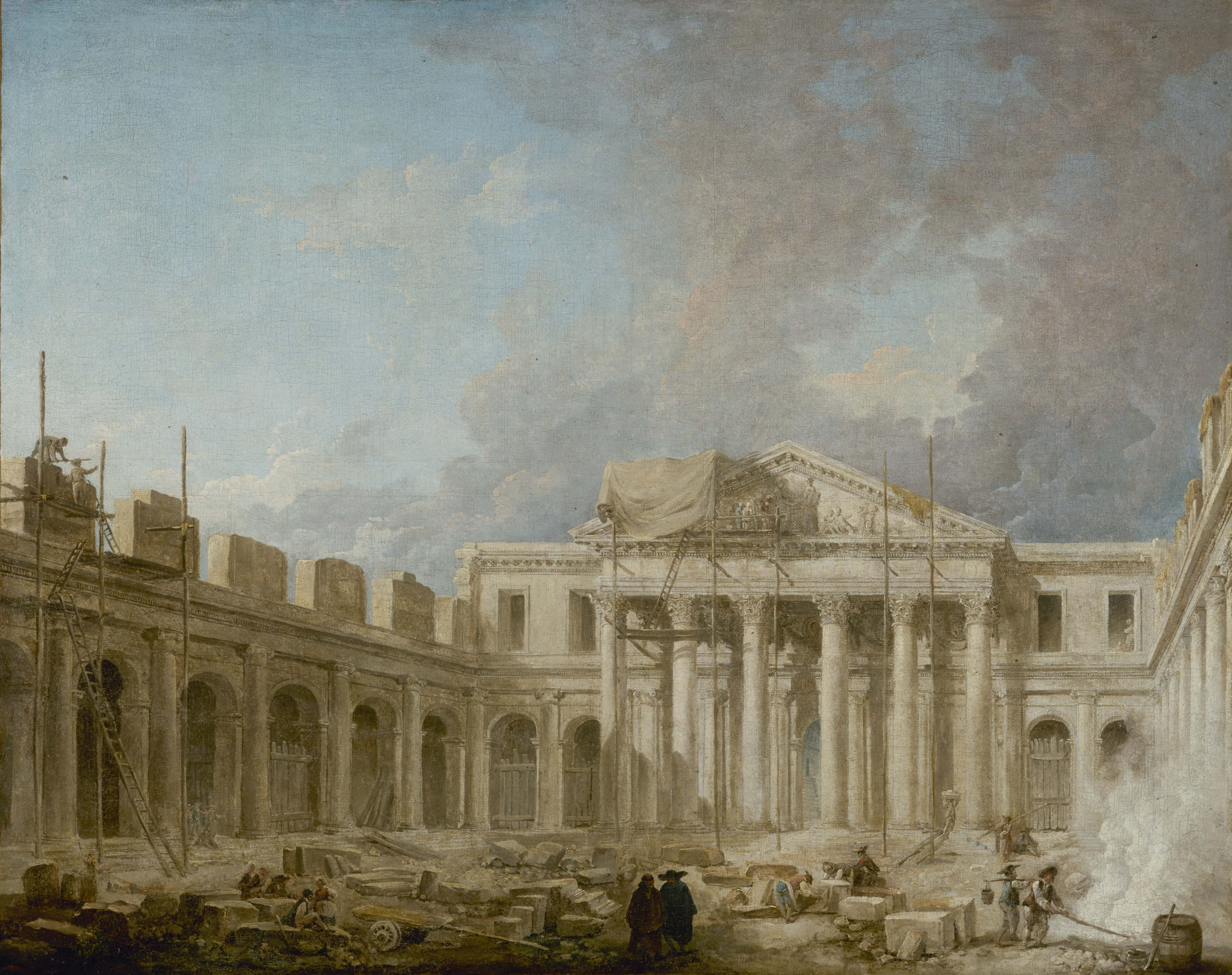
The École de Chirurgie Under Construction by Hubert Robert, 1773

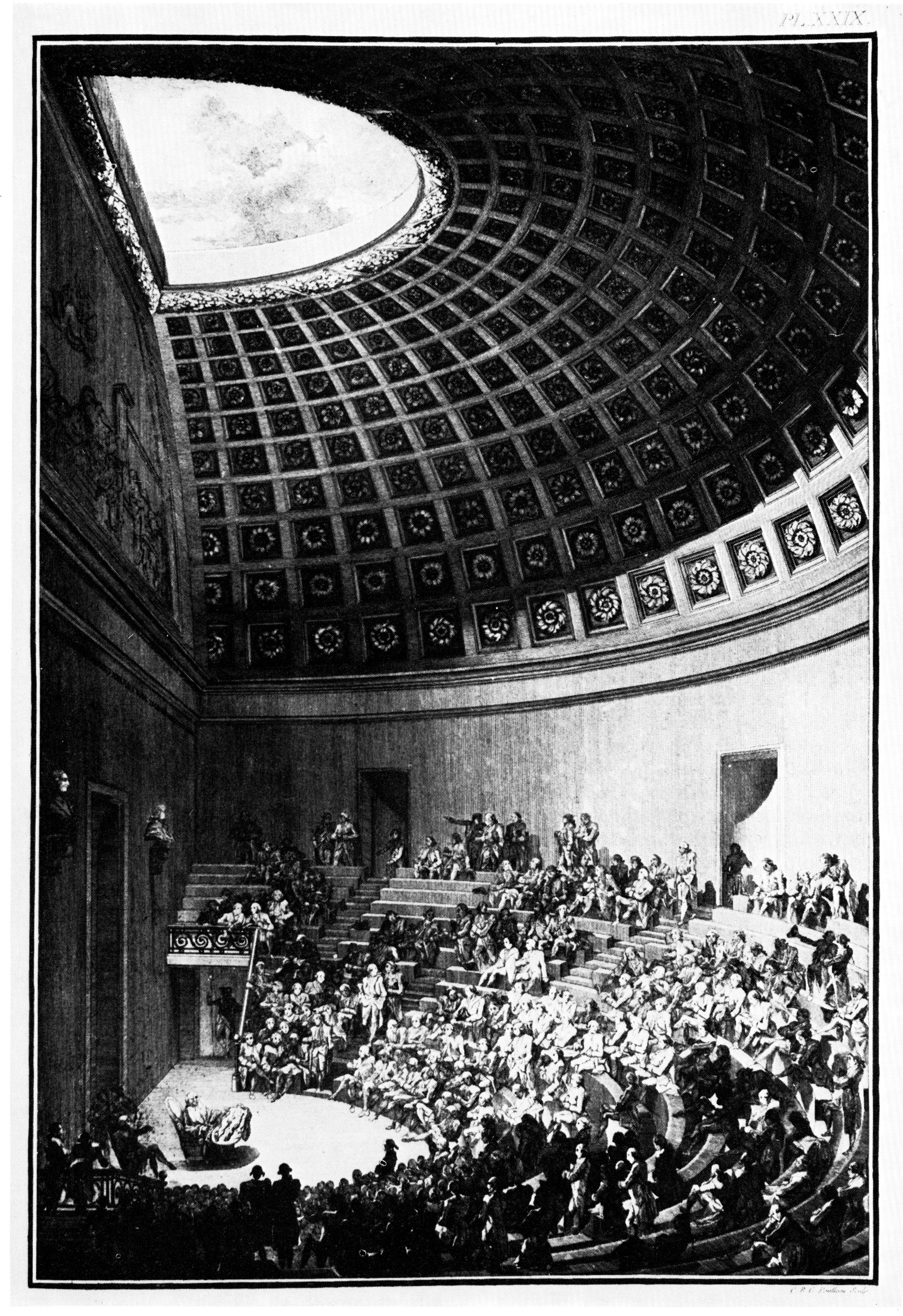
View of Amphitheatre

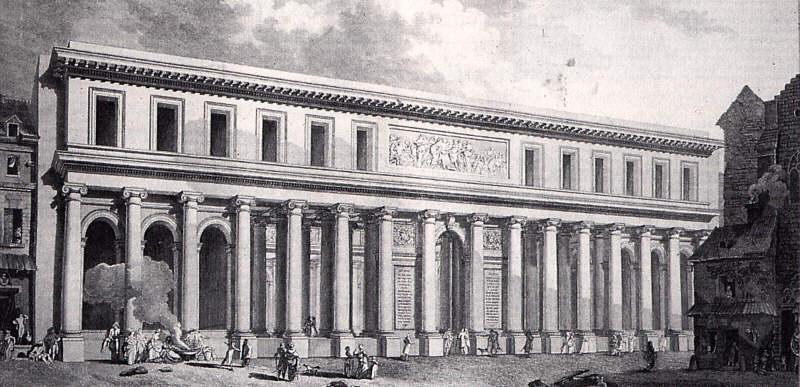
Street Facade and Relief Panel

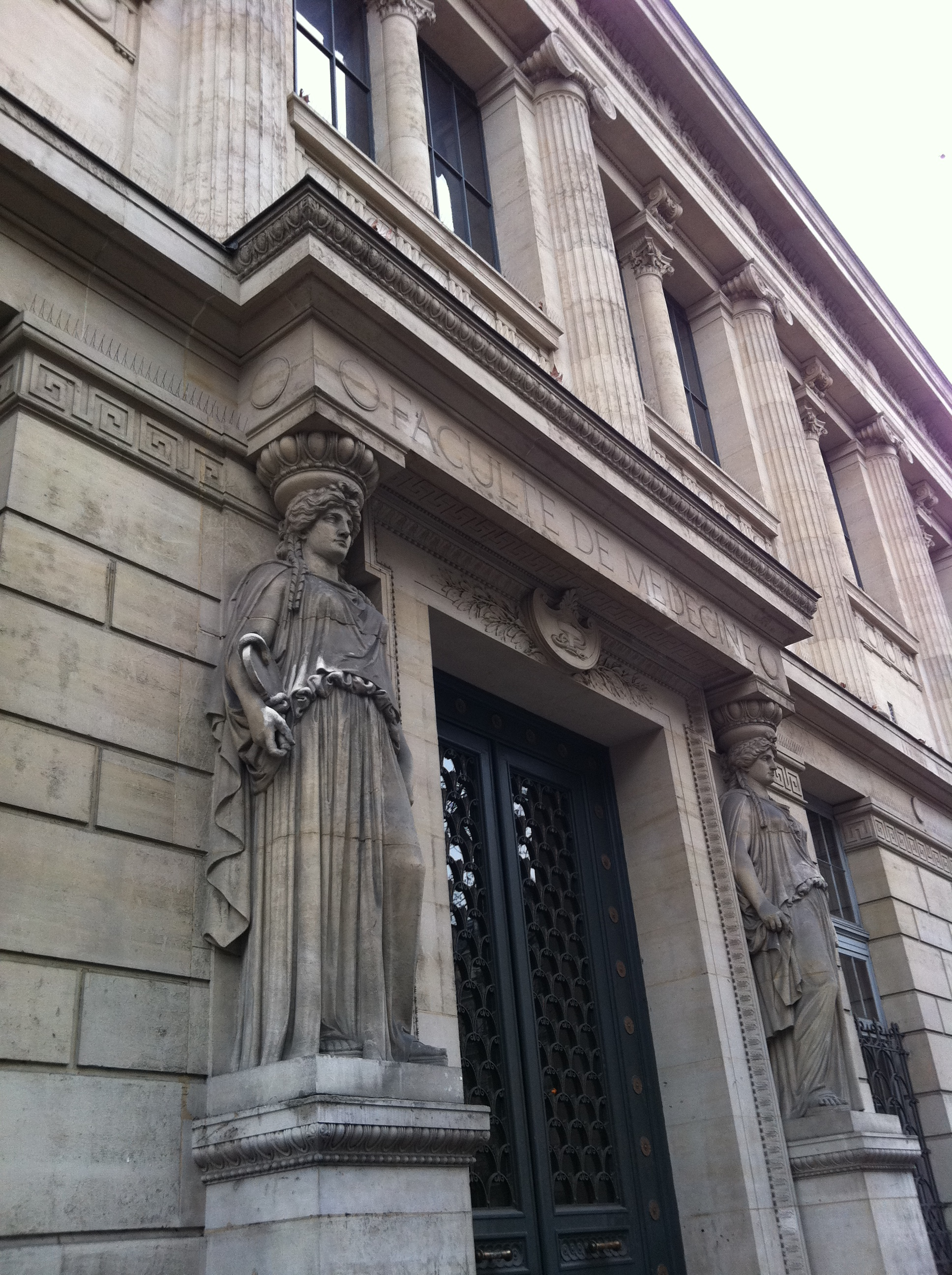
Late-19C portal of the extension at 83, boulevard Saint-Germain

== Legacy ==
Gondoin's design for the main theatre was copied later in debating chambers and post-revolutionary government buildings. The Palais Bourbon, seat of the French National Assembly, follows this model as well.
