= Empiricism of organization =

Political analysis method created by Charles Maurras, inspired by positivism

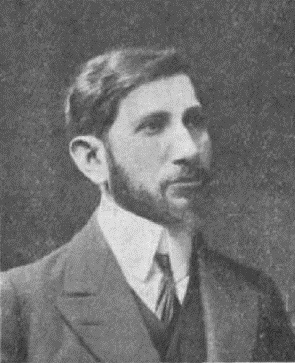
Charles Maurras

Organizing Empiricism is a political analysis method created by Charles Maurras, inspired by positivism. This method involves analyzing the present in light of the past to predict societal evolution through psychology and derive principles for action. The application of this positivist doctrine in politics observes historical laws and culminates in integral nationalism. Maurras argued that society's organization and institutions should result from a centuries-long selection process, with monarchy considered optimal for France.

Maurras summarized organizing empiricism as "leveraging the successes of the past for the future every well-born spirit wishes for their country." He also encapsulated the concept in the phrase, "Our teacher in politics is experience."

Maurrassian organizing empiricism claims to derive political truths, social laws, and psychological norms from history:

The examination of natural social facts and the analysis of political history lead to certain certainties. The past establishes them, psychology explains them, and the subsequent course of contemporary events confirms them day by day.

Through organizing empiricism, Maurras rejected deterministic philosophies, whether optimistic like Marxism or pessimistic like Guénonism, as well as the democratic idea that the future can be built without regard for the past, based solely on public opinion.

== Intellectual Origins ==
Maurras traced the roots of organizing empiricism to Thomism as interpreted by Jacques Maritain and, more broadly, the Philosophia perennis of Socrates, Plato, and Aristotle.

He directly drew inspiration from the analytical methods of literary critic Sainte-Beuve, coining the term "organizing empiricism." Sainte-Beuve's approach was known for its impartiality, emphasis on experience, and effort to explore contradictions in literary, political, and philosophical currents.

The method also incorporated traditional (ancient and medieval), counter-revolutionary, and positivist thought, particularly that of Auguste Comte.

== Influence ==
According to writer Jacques Paugam, Charles de Gaulle may have employed organizing empiricism in orchestrating the independence of Sub-Saharan Africa.

Organizing empiricism attracted several renowned historians to Action française, including Jacques Bainville, Pierre Gaxotte, Michel Mourre, Philippe Ariès, and Pierre Chardon.

== Bibliography ==
- Francis Moury (2017). "Charles Maurras et le positivisme d'Auguste Comte". Nouvelle École (66): 123–130.
- Maurice Plamondon (1980). "L'empirisme organisateur de Charles Maurras et celui de la Revue critique des idées et des livres". Études maurrassiennes (4). Aix-en-Provence: 193–205.
- Pierre Maureau (1972). "Sur l'empirisme organisateur". Études maurrassiennes. 1. Aix-en-Provence: 107–114.

== See also ==
=== Related Articles ===
- Integral nationalism
- Charles Maurras
- Action française
- Charles-Augustin Sainte-Beuve
- For a Party of Intelligence
- Jacques Bainville
