= Marie-Aimée de Kermorvan =

Mauritian writer and poet (1904–1985)

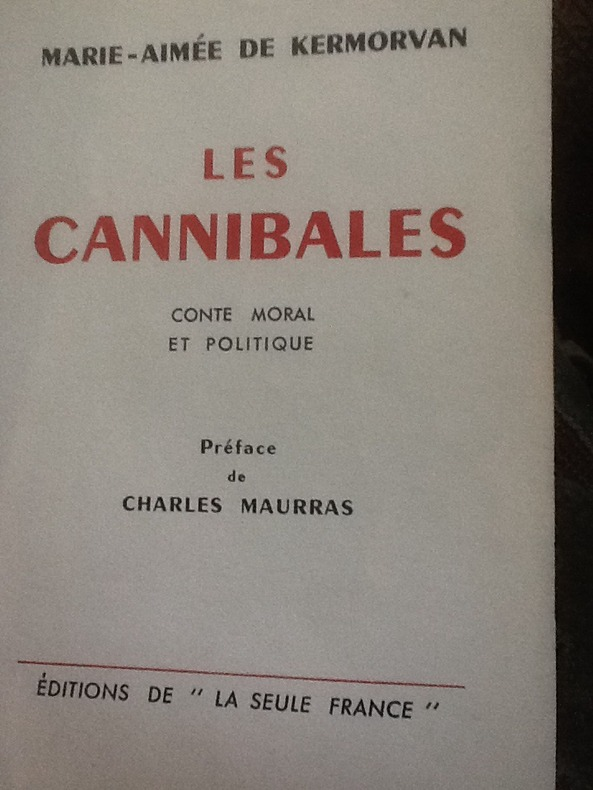
- 1951 book
- Born: 1904; Curepipe
- Died: 1985 (aged 80–81)
- Occupations: writer and poet
- Known for: poetry

Marie-Aimée de Kermorvan or Marie-Aimée Vigoureux de Kermorvan (1904 – 1985) was a Mauritian writer and poet. She spent her childhood in Mauritius and later published several books of writing and poetry in French. She was identified as a leading writer at her country's independence in 1968. In 1979 the Sivet Foundation awarded her a 2,000 franc prize for her last book "Choice of Poems".

== Life ==
Kermorvan was born in Curepipe in 1904 and she was raised there. Her parents were Léontine Eugénie Manès and Jean Baptiste Lucien Vigoureux de Kermorvan and she was one of their four children. In 1921 she and her family moved to Paris.

In 1929 her book of poetry, Soleil de France: poèmes, was published in France by the Librairie de la Revue française (now called Editions Gallimard) Kermorvan's 1936 book had an introduction by Raymond de La Tailhède. Her 1951 book, Les Cannibales, involved politics and morality and it had a preface by her nationalist friend Charles Maurras.

In 1968 her country gained its independence from the UK. The leading books of her country were identified by the British government in 1967 and the list included two of her books, Jeu de balance, from 1936 and Eurydice aux rives du jour from 1964.

She was awarded the Sivet Prize in 1979 which was given every five years by the Sivet Foundation to a “writer not domiciled in Paris, local poet if possible and preferably from Foréz”. There were three awards that year; Jean-Pierre Gaubert was given the medal and she was awarded 2,000 francs for her 1978 book of poetry "Choice of Poems".

She died in September 1985.

== Works ==
- Soleil de France, poetry, 1929.
- Jeu de balance, 1936.
- Les Cannibales, poetry, 1951.
- Eurydice aux rives du jour, 1964, éditions Brochés.
- Choix de poésies, Points et Contrepoints, poetry, 1978, éditions Brochés.
