= Musée Dupuytren =

Museum of wax anatomical items in Paris

Coordinates: 48.8505°N 2.3413°E

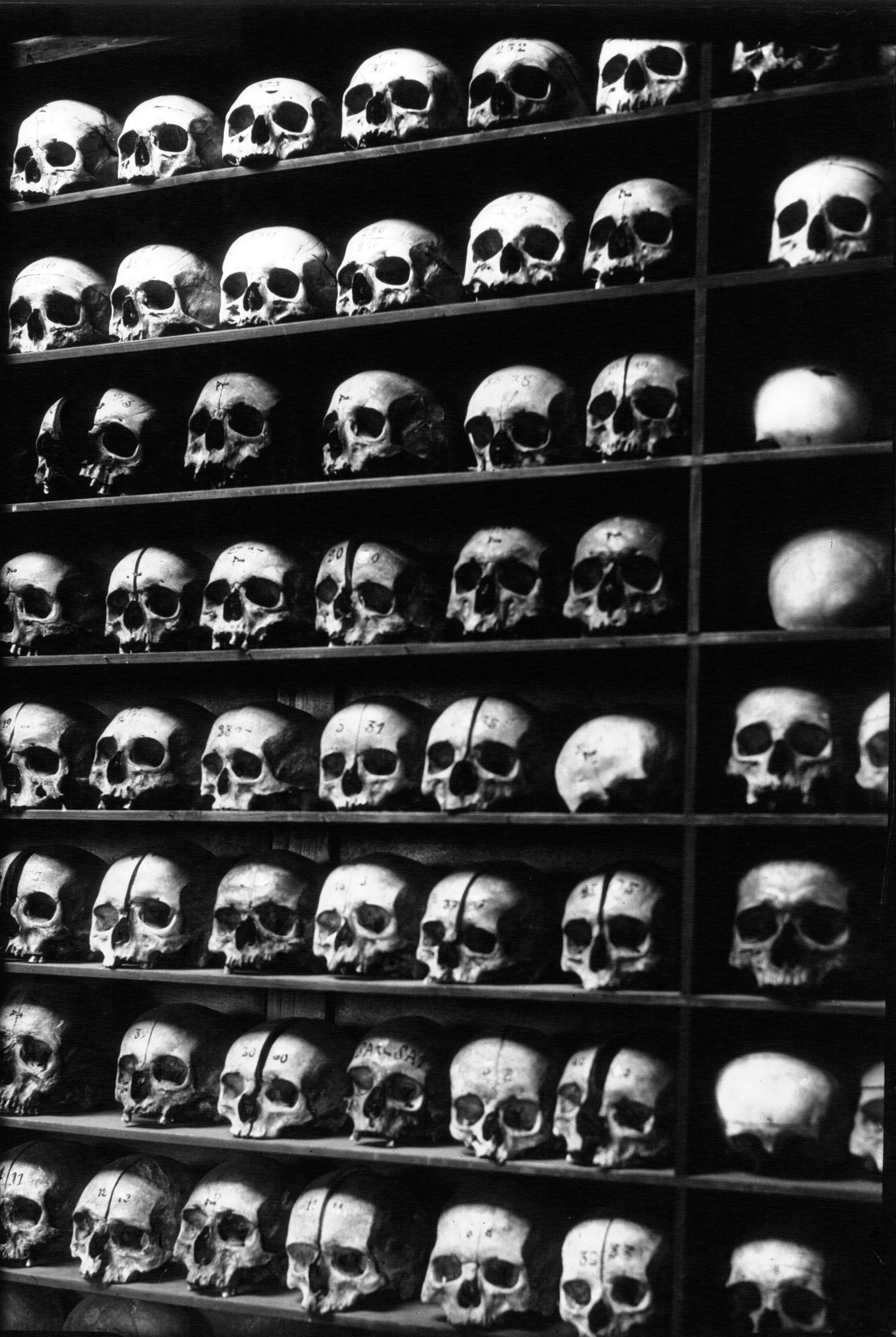
Skeletons and skulls of the museum in 1926.

The Musée Dupuytren was a museum of wax anatomical items and specimens illustrating diseases and malformations. It was located at the Cordeliers Convent campus, 15, rue de l'Ecole de Médecine, Les Cordeliers, Paris, France, and is part of the Sorbonne University Faculty of Medicine. In 2016 the museum was closed and moved to the Jussieu Campus, joining 8 scientific collections of Sorbonne University. The collections will be open to students and researchers, and will be open to the public for events.

== History ==
The museum was established in 1835 by Mathieu Orfila as the Museum of Pathological Anatomy of the Medicine Faculty of the University of Paris, with the request of Baron Guillaume Dupuytren, anatomist and celebrated professor of surgery. The museum was installed in the old refectory of the Cordeliers Convent, gathering collections from throughout the faculty. Its first catalog was compiled between 1836 and 1842, and listed about a thousand specimens. By the late 1870s the museum contained over six thousand pieces.

The museum began a slow decline starting in the late 19th century, despite continued acquisition of new collections, and its upkeep became problematic. In 1937 Gustave Roussy ordered the museum shut, with many items subsequently lost or destroyed. However, in 1967 Jacques Delarue (1901–1971) brought the museum back to life with a general refurbishment. Today it still retains an extensive collection including specimens dating from the 17th century, as well as wax anatomical models, books, and photographs.

Among many other notable items, the museum contains brains of aphasic patients, preserved in alcohol by the celebrated anatomist Paul Pierre Broca, and used in his research in the localization of brain functions.

== See also ==
- List of museums in Paris
- Musée d'Anatomie Delmas-Orfila-Rouvière
