= Latin Quarter, Paris =

Urban university campus in Paris, France

Coordinates: 48°51′00″N 02°20′33″E

Latin Quarter
- District
- Quartier latin
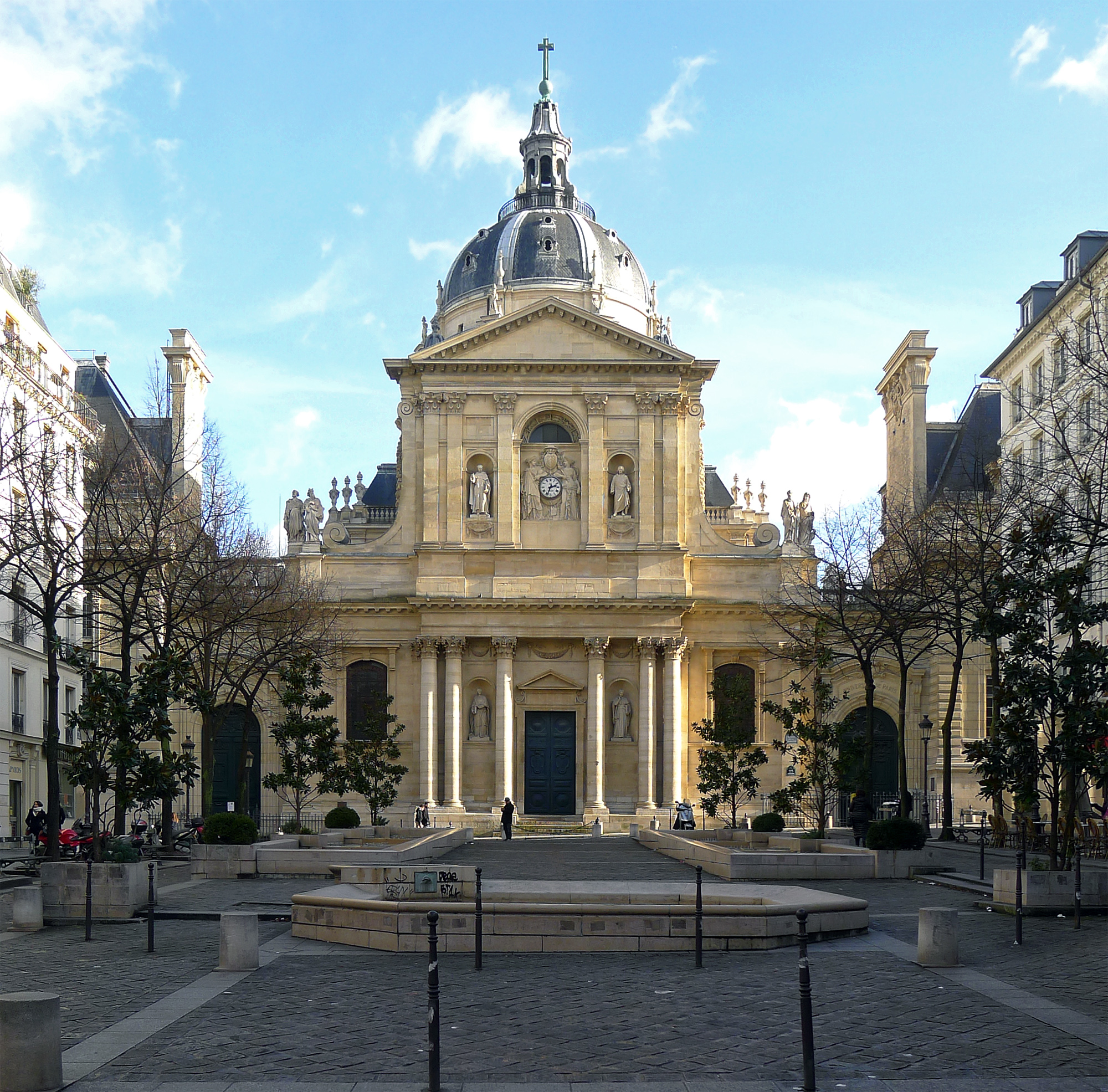
- The Sorbonne Chapel
- Interactive map of Latin Quarter
- Country: France
- Region: Île-de-France
- Ville: Paris
- Arrondissement: 5th

The Latin Quarter of Paris (French: Quartier latin, IPA: [kaʁtje latɛ̃]) is a district in Paris on the left bank of the Seine, around the Sorbonne. Located in the city's 5th and the 6th arrondissements, it is known for its concentration of universities.

Although there has been some exodus, new schools have appeared, and the Latin Quarter continues to be the heart of the universities, and Grandes écoles that succeeded the University of Paris, including the Sorbonne University, Panthéon-Sorbonne University, Paris Cité University, PSL University, Panthéon-Assas University, and Sciences Po.

The area gets its name from the Latin language, which was widely spoken in and around the University during the Middle Ages, after the twelfth century philosopher Pierre Abélard and his students took up residence there.

== Academic institutions ==
Universities, libraries, and other academic institutions in the Latin Quarter of Paris include:

- the Sorbonne University, with the Sorbonne, and the Pierre-et-Marie-Curie campus
- the Panthéon-Sorbonne University, with the Panthéon Centre and its Law School, and which also has teaching programs within the Sorbonne
- the Paris Cité University, with the École de Médecine building and the Cordeliers campus
- the PSL University, with the École Normale Supérieure, the Collège de France, the École des Mines, the École Nationale Supérieure de Chimie, and the ENSAD
- the Panthéon-Assas University, with its Assas Law School within the Panthéon Centre
- and the Sciences Po

The Latin Quarter is also home to the largest university libraries in Paris, such as the Sainte-Geneviève Library, the Sorbonne Library, the Sainte-Barbe Library, the Assas Law Library and the Cujas Law Library.

University administrative buildings are also located in the district, such as the presidency of Sorbonne University in the Cordeliers Convent or the headquarters of Paris Cité University in the former École de Médecine. Grandes écoles such as the École polytechnique have relocated in recent times to more spacious settings, notably in Paris-Saclay.

Other academic institutions in the Latin Quarter include:

- the Schola Cantorum, a private music conservatory
- the secondary schools lycée Henri-IV, lycée Louis-le-Grand the lycée Saint-Louis, known as les trois lycées de la montagne.
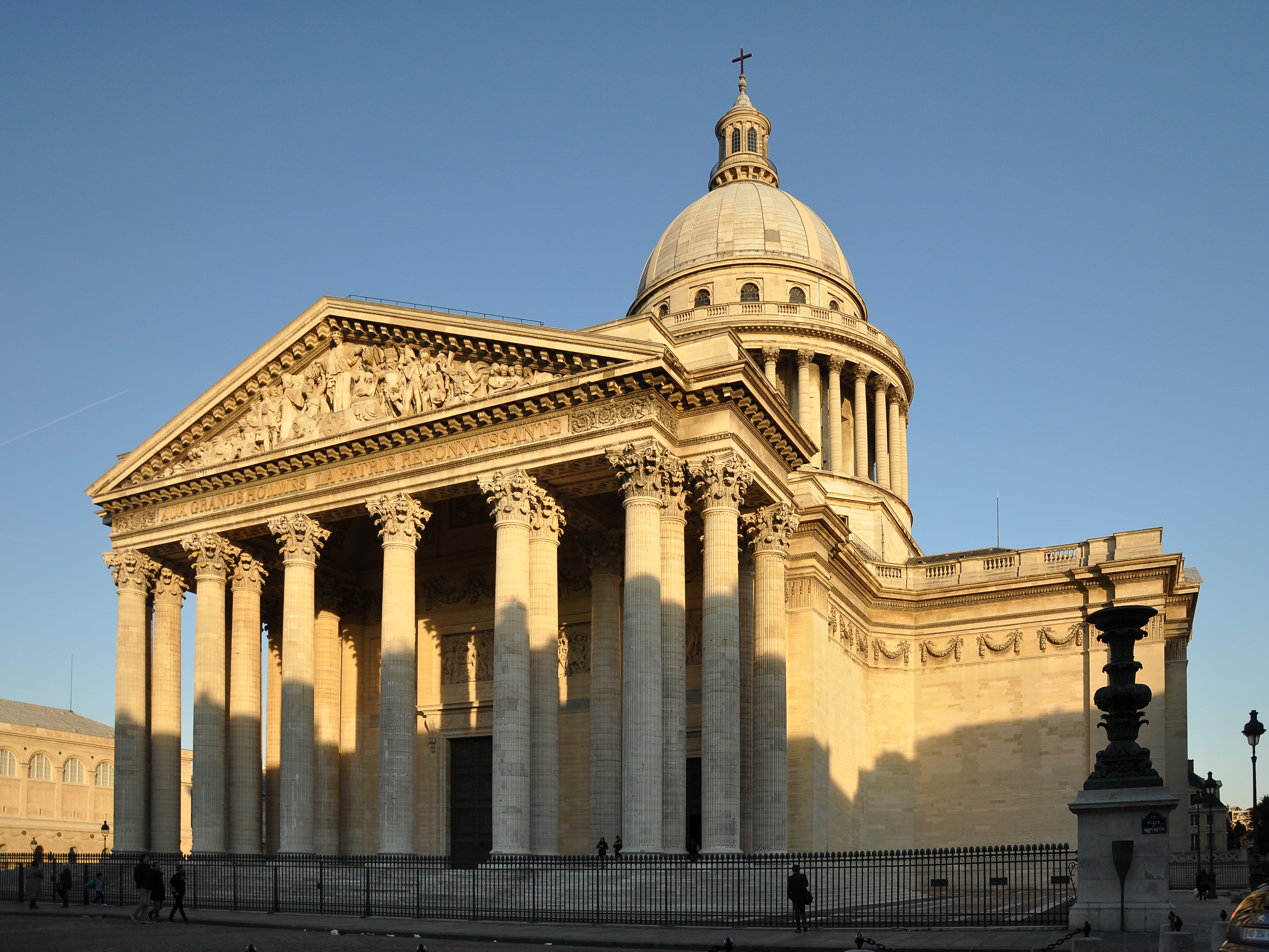
The Panthéon

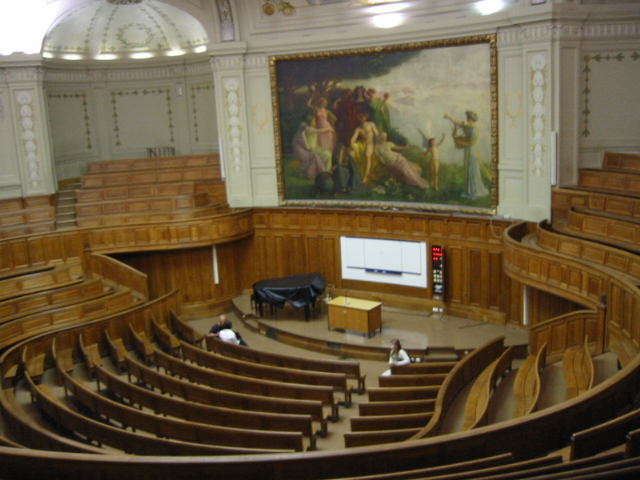
The Sorbonne amphitheater

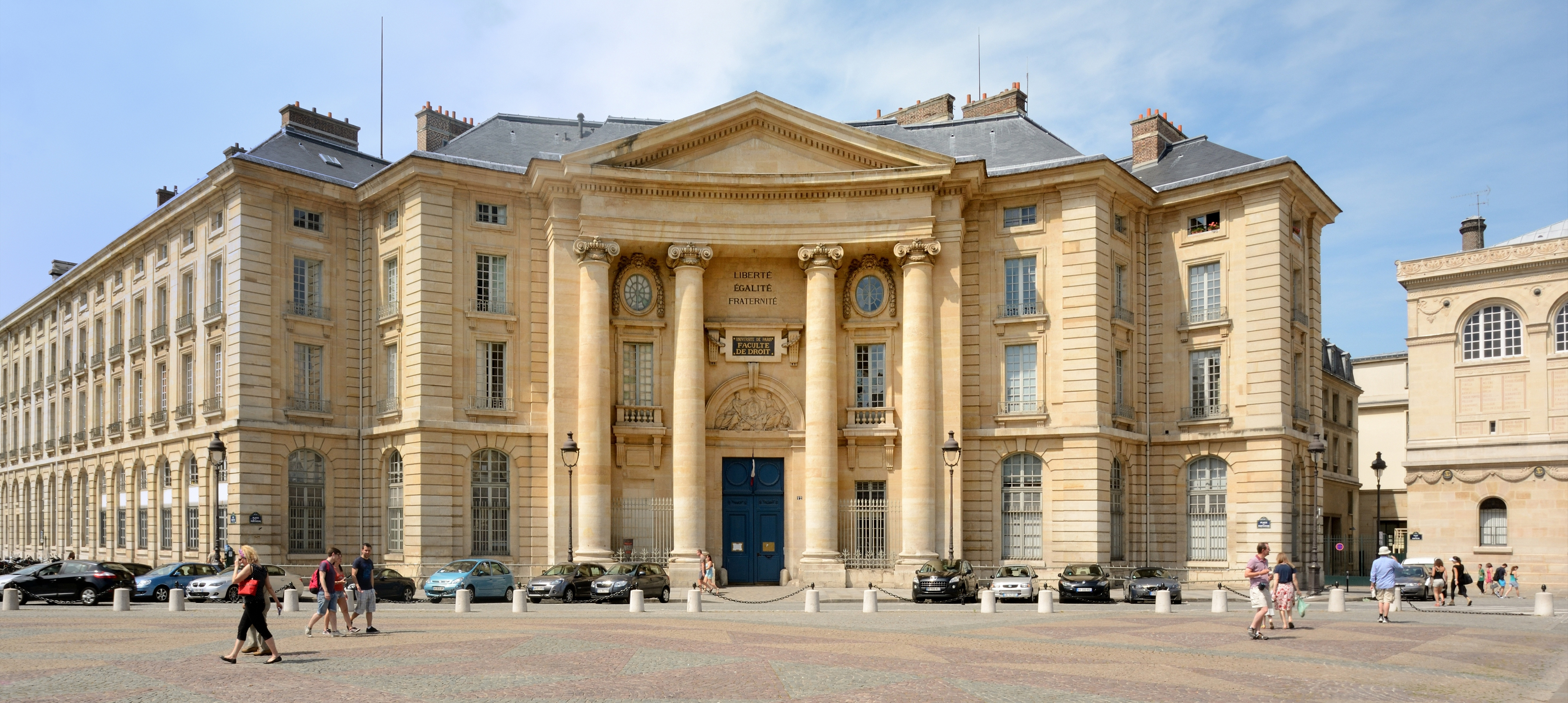
The Panthéon Centre, home to the Panthéon-Sorbonne School of Law and the Assas Law School

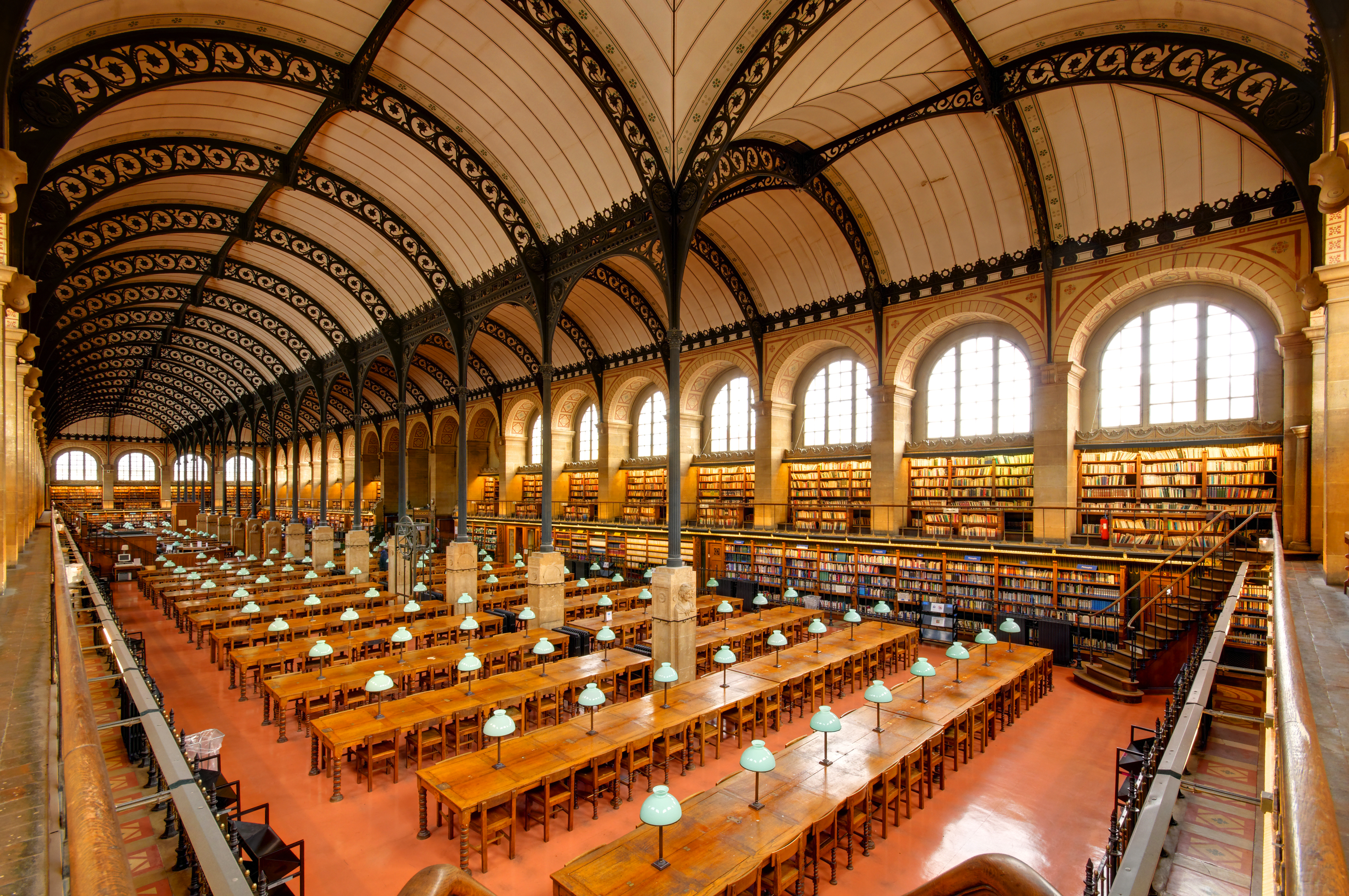
The reading room of the Sainte-Geneviève Library, Sorbonne Nouvelle University

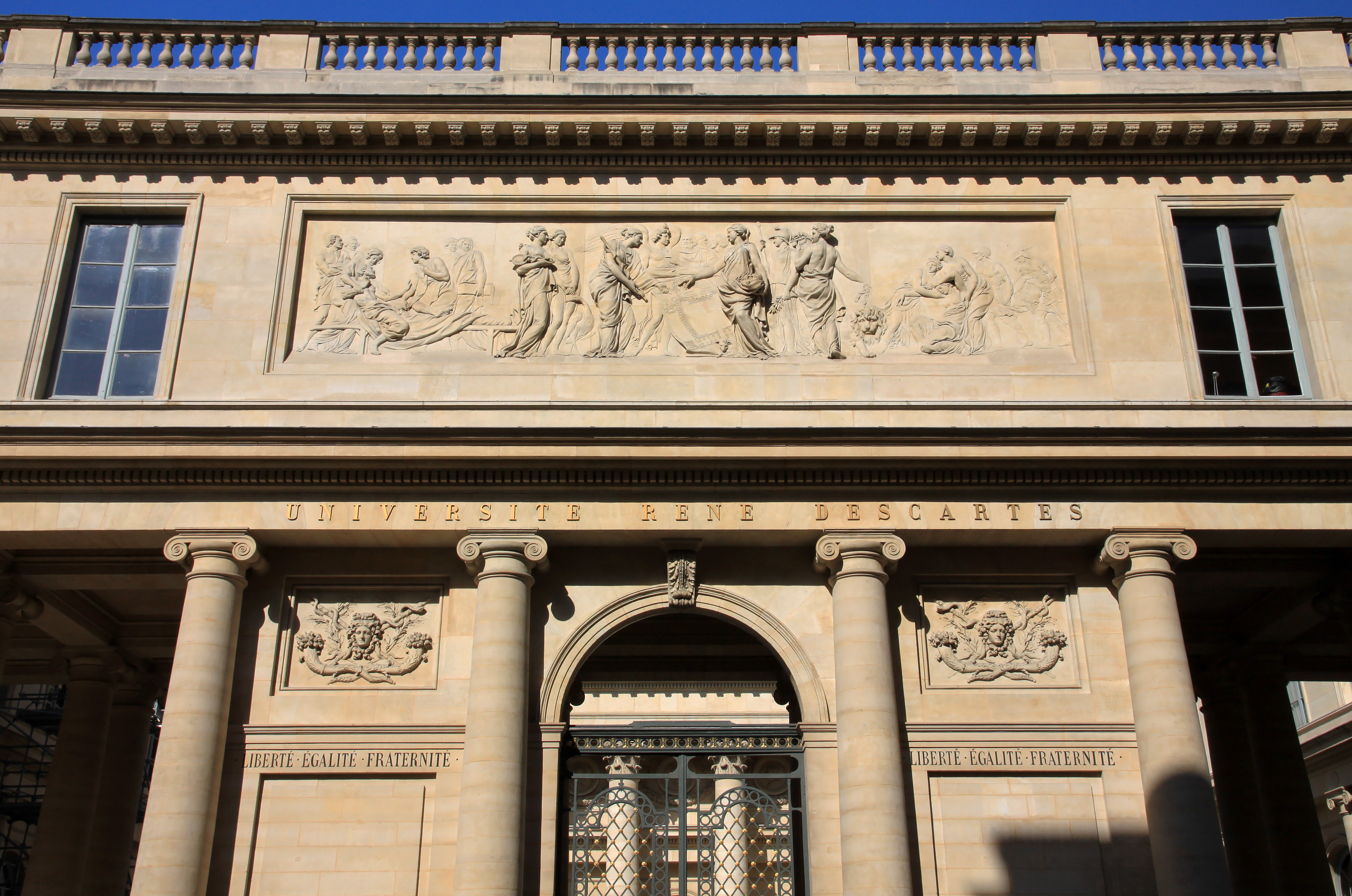
The Paris Cité University (medicine), within the École de Médecine building

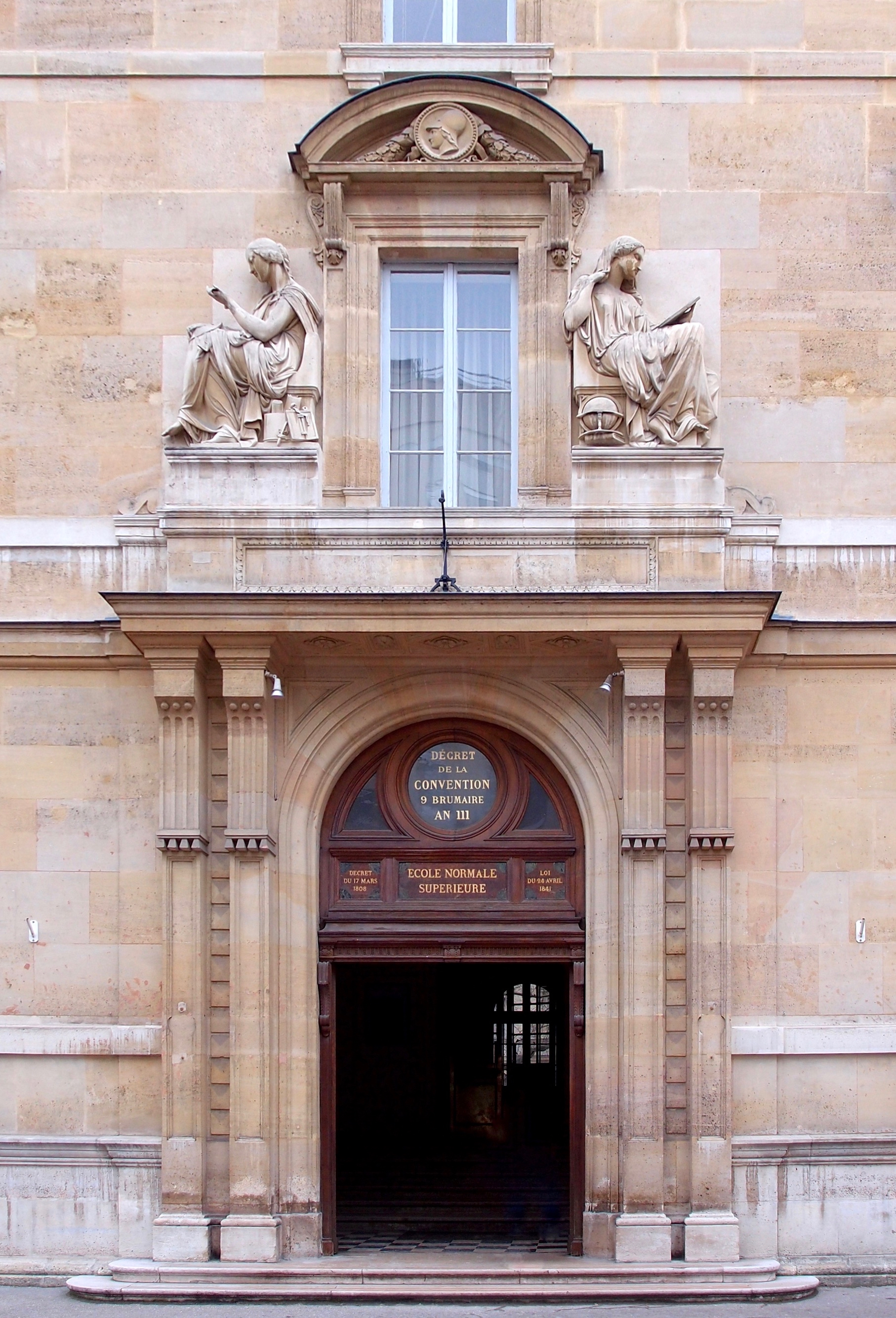
The École normale supérieure, PSL University

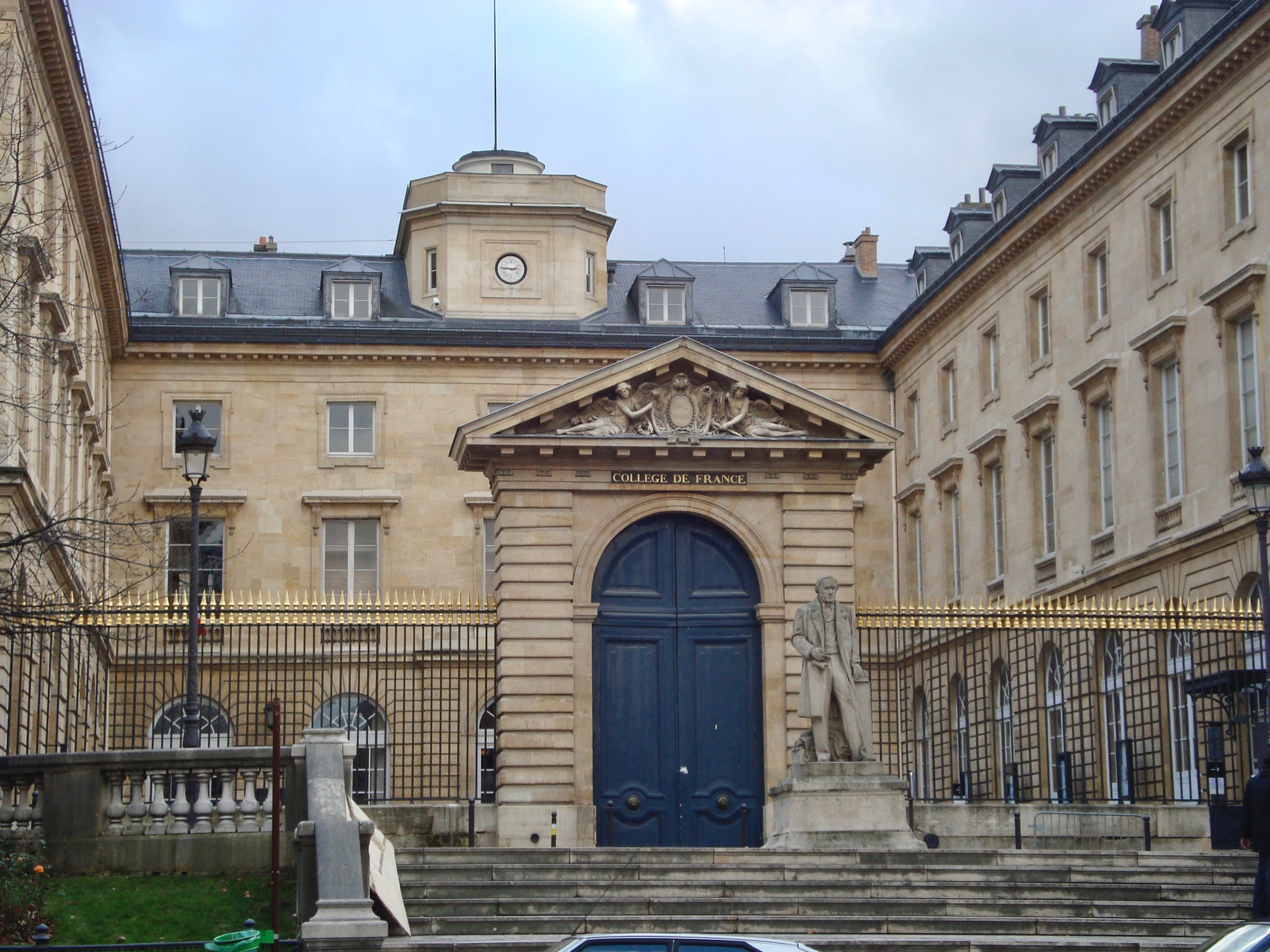
The Collège de France, PSL University

== Community life ==
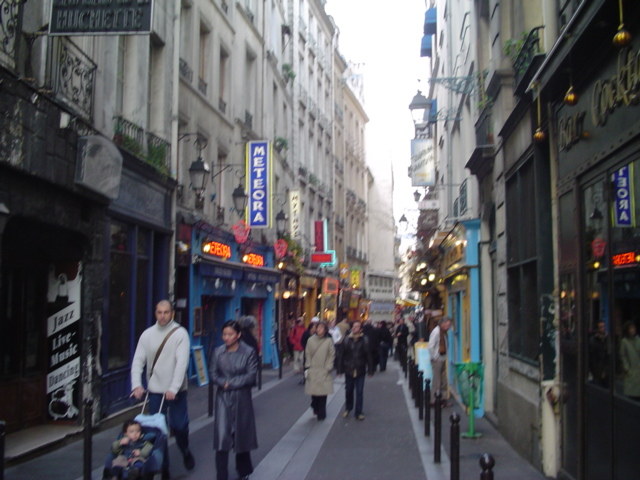
View of Rue de la Huchette (October 2003)

== In popular culture ==
The Latin Quarter is the setting of Puccini's tragic opera, La Bohème.

== See also ==
- List of restaurant districts and streets
- Montagne Sainte-Geneviève
- Paris Sciences et Lettres University
- Sorbonne University
- Université Paris Cité
