= University of Paris Faculty of Law =

Faculty of the University of Paris

Coordinates: 48.8469°N 2.3447°E

Faculty of Law of Paris
- Faculté de droit de Paris
- Other names: c. 1100 – 1229: École de droit de Paris; 1229–1679: Consultissima decretorum facultas (Faculty of Canon Law); 1679–1793: Faculté de droit civil et canonique; 1802–1896: École de droit de Paris; 1896–1950s: Faculté de droit de Paris; 1950s–1970: Faculté de droit et d'économie de Paris
- Active: 12th century–1970
- Current successors: Paris 1 Panthéon-Sorbonne University (École de droit de la Sorbonne); Paris-Panthéon-Assas University (Collège et École de droit)

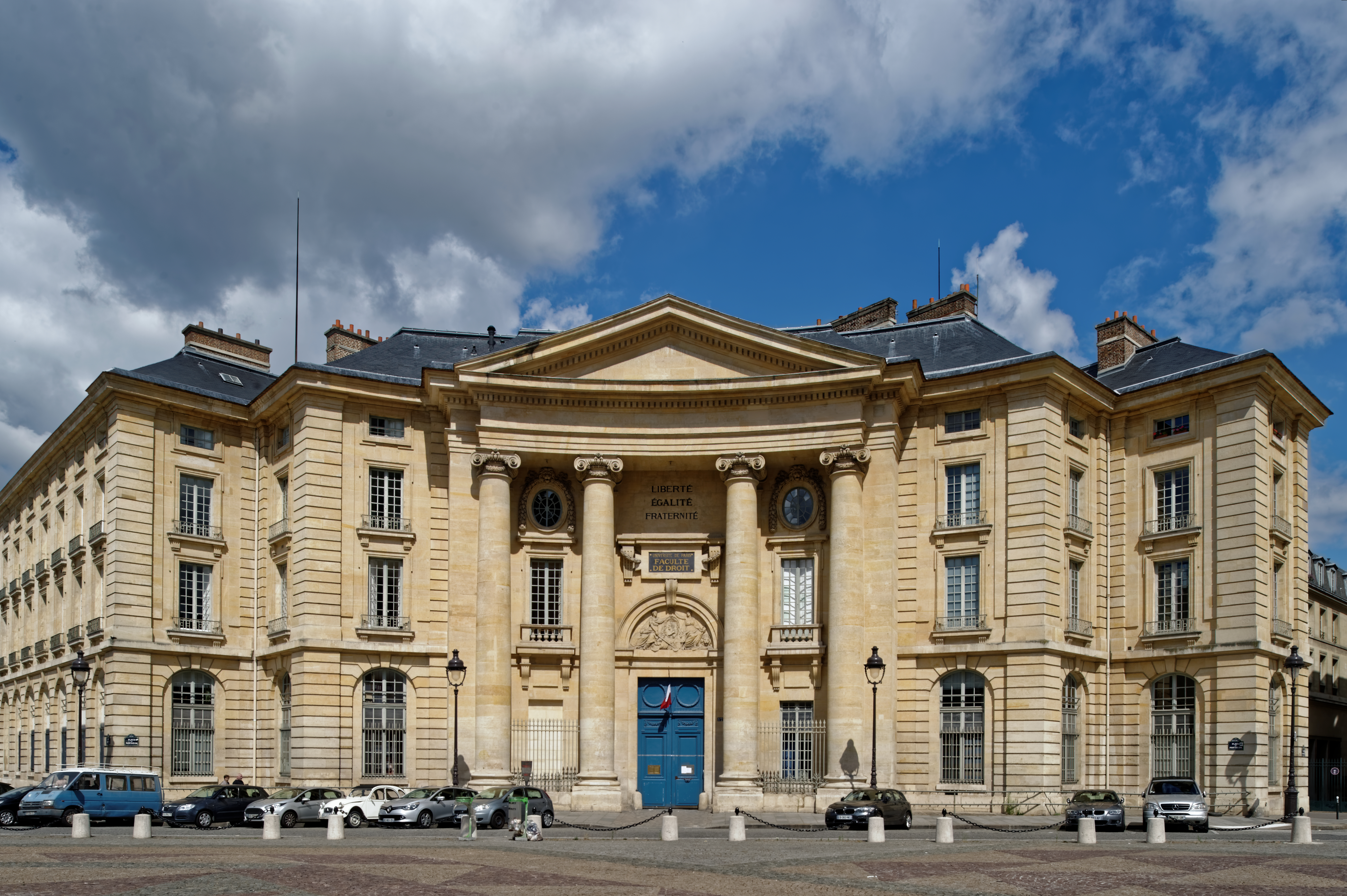
The structure designed by Jacques-Germain Soufflot for the Paris Law Faculty, on place du Panthéon

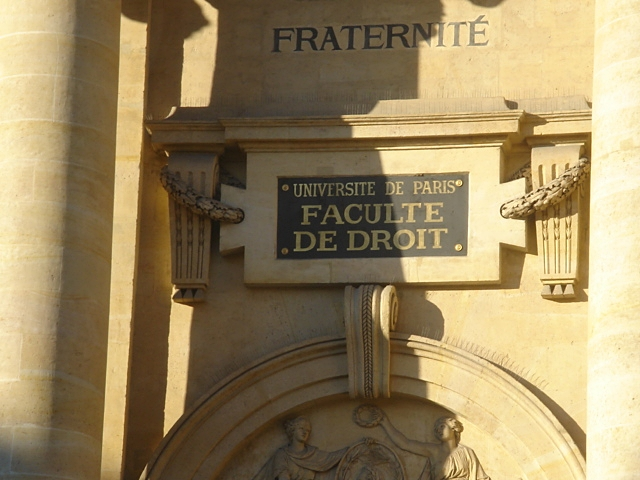

The Faculty of Law of Paris (French: Faculté de droit de Paris), called from the late 1950s to 1970 the Faculty of Law and Economics of Paris, is the second-oldest faculty of law in the world and one of the four and eventually five faculties of the University of Paris ("the Sorbonne"), from the 12th century until 1970.

During the Middle Ages, it was one of the two most important faculties of law in the world, along with the faculty of law of the University of Bologna (the oldest in the world). Pierre Abélard, founder of modern law, was its precursor, as a teacher at the cathedral school of Notre-Dame de Paris, Andrea Alciato, founder of legal humanism, was a professor there, and Saint Ivo, patron of lawyers and "Advocate of the Poor" according to the Catholic Church, had studied there. The prohibition by the Pope of teaching of Roman Law limited, however, its growth, to the benefit of the nearby University of Orléans, where numerous important French people studied law. In 1679, King Louis authorized the teaching of Roman Law. Numerous French intellectuals and revolutionaries, like Voltaire, Diderot and d'Alembert, Robespierre, etc. studied there. Between the French Revolution and its dissolution in 1970, numerous important people in France and in the world taught or studied there, including Victor Hugo, Claude Lévi-Strauss, Tocqueville, and Honoré de Balzac. The faculty of law is also mentioned in classical French literature, in particular in Les Misérables.

At the dissolution of the Sorbonne in 1970, its two main buildings were place du Panthéon and rue d'Assas. Most of its law professors (88 out of 108) decided to perpetuate the faculty of law and economics by creating and joining a university of law offering the same programs within the same two buildings; therefore, they created the "University of Law, Economics and Social Sciences of Paris", now called Panthéon-Assas University. Likewise, most of the economics professors (35 out of 41) preferred to found the multidisciplinary Paris 1 Panthéon-Sorbonne University with professors of the faculty of humanities of Paris and a few professors of law.

== History ==
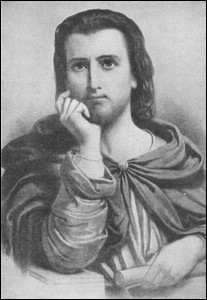
Pierre Abelard, theologian and logician before the existence of the faculty of law, who gave to the Sorbonne a recognition for its expertise in law in the early 20th century

=== c. 1100 – 1223: Law School of Paris ===
Pierre Abélard, teacher at the great cathedral school of Notre-Dame de Paris (that would eventually become the Sorbonne), writing with the influence of his wife Héloïse, stressed that subjective intention determines the moral value of human action and therefore that the legal consequence of an action is related to the person that commits it and not merely to the action. With this doctrine, Abelard created in the Middle Ages the idea of the individual subject central to modern law. This gave to School of Notre-Dame de Paris (later the University of Paris) a recognition of its expertise in the area of Law, even before the faculty of Law existed and the school even recognized as an "universitas" and even if Abelard was primarily a logician and a theologian. The law grew afterwards to be a discipline in its own rights (rather than only a subject within theology and philosophy), and a faculty of law was founded.

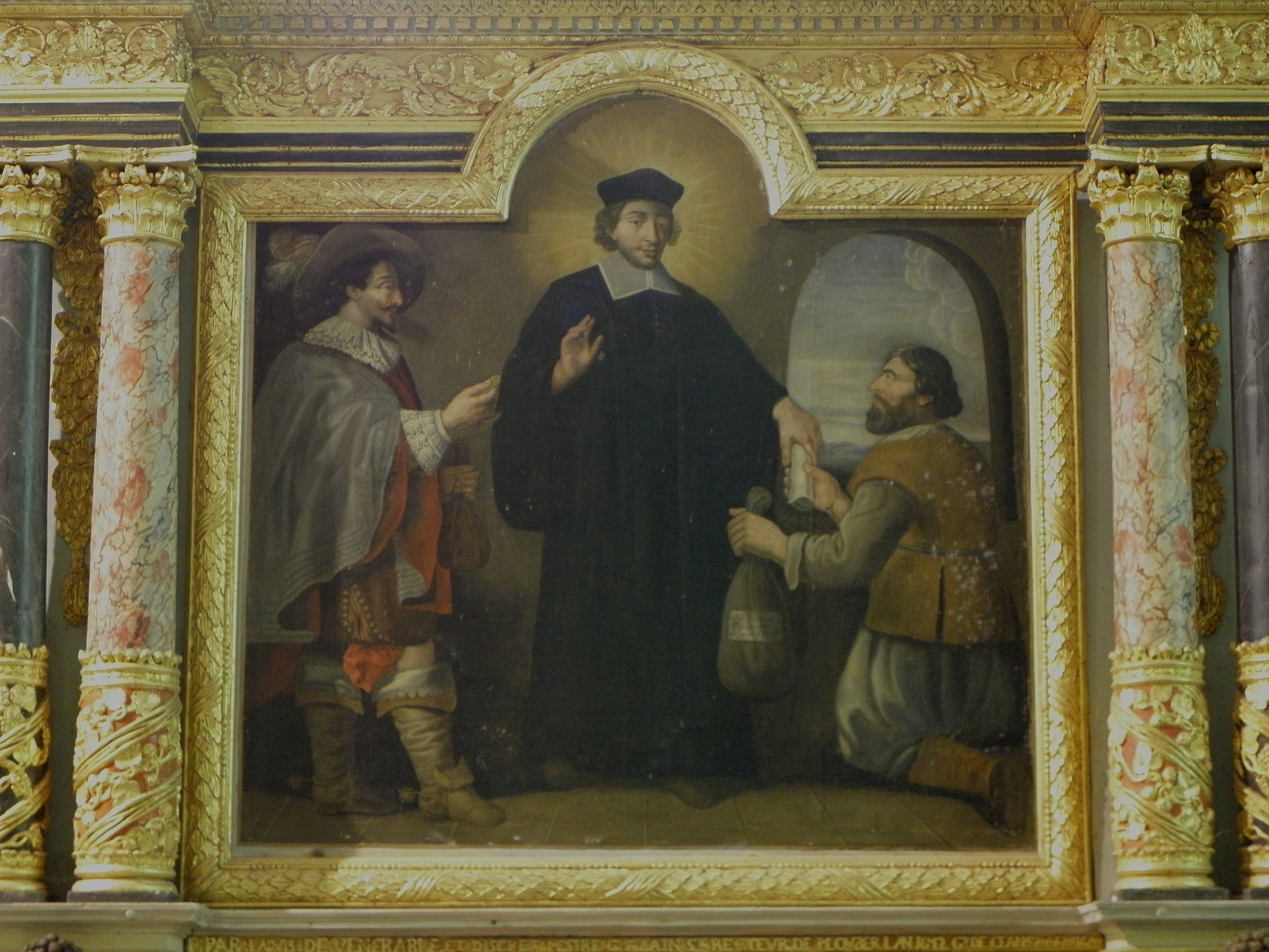
Saint Ivo, alumnus, declared saint by the Church in 1347, patron of the lawyers, "Advocate of the Poor". His day is still celebrated by the lawyers, at least in France. In this painting, he is bringing justice between a rich and a poor person

=== 1223–1679: Faculty of Canon Law ===
The Pope forbade Roman law in Paris in 1223 with the decretal Super Specula. Afterwards, the Paris Law Faculty was called "Faculté de décret" or "Consultissima decretorum facultas", meaning Faculty of Canon Law.

During this period, people who wanted to learn civil law (Roman Law) and become lawyers would usually go to the nearby faculty of law of the University of Orléans. Hence, Molière, Calvin, Perrault, Cujas, Rabelais, Fermat, La Boétie and others went to this faculty.

=== 1679–1793: Faculty of civil and canon law ===
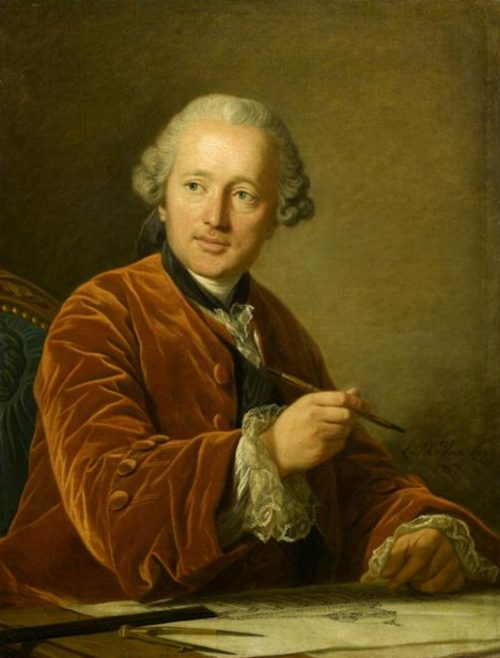
Jacques-Germain Soufflot, alumnus and architect of the Panthéon building of the Faculty of Law of Paris, opened in 1774

After the Edict of Saint-Germain of April 1679 by Louis XIV reestablished the teaching of Roman law in Paris, the faculty was known as the "faculty of civil and canon law".

Louis XIV also introduced French Customary Law into the programs.

The faculty was closed alongside other faculties on September 15, 1793, by the French Revolution.

=== 1802–1970: Faculty of Law of Paris ===
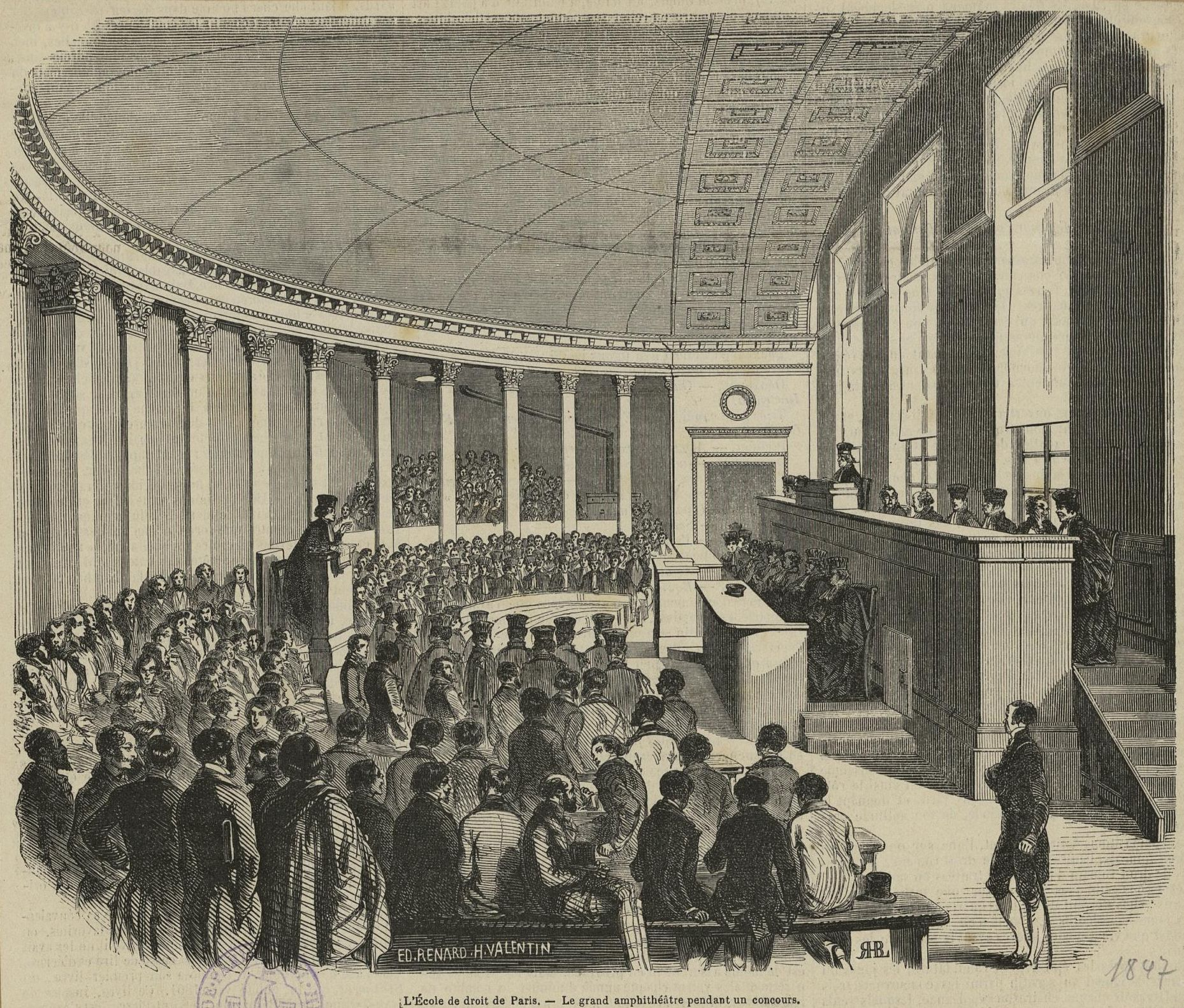
Large amphitheatre of the Faculty of Law of Paris in 1847

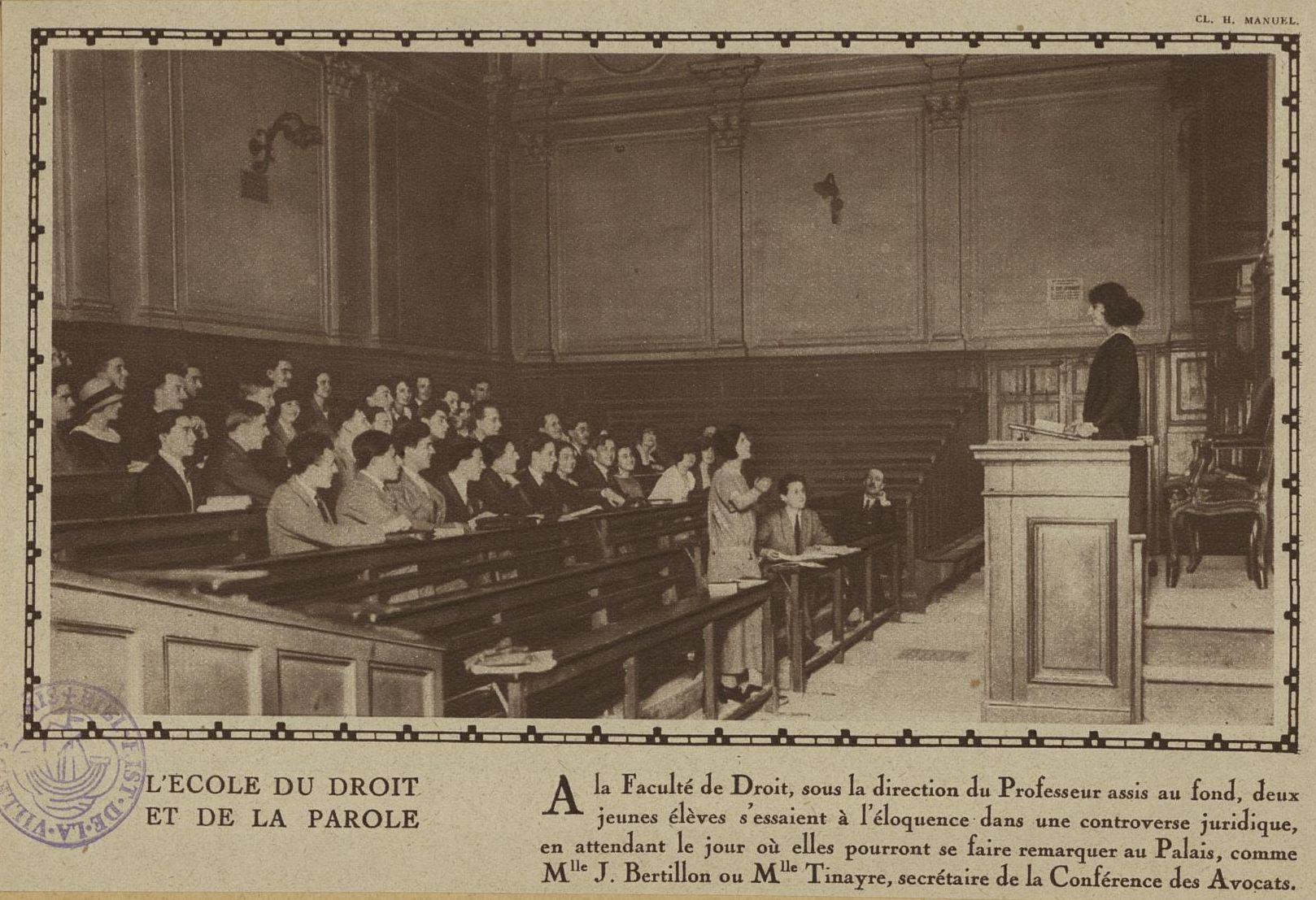
Course at the Faculty of Law of Paris in the early 20th century

In 1802, the faculty of law was re-opened, and was called "the School of Law of Paris" (l'École de droit de Paris). In 1896, the law faculty and the henceforth four other Parisian faculties were grouped together to recreate the University of Paris. In the late 1950s, it became a "faculty of law and economics".

The Code Civil was taught after its creation in 1804. The programs were reformed at the end of the 19th century.

Originally, the faculty of law was not organized around research centers and professors were pursuing their research as part of faculty of law in general. Hence, only newly emerging fields of research would have newly created institutes, whereas traditional subjects such as Roman Law and Legal History, Private Law in general and Public law in general, would not necessarily have ones.

"Doctorate courses" existed in legal studies at that time until they were replaced in 1925 by the "Diplôme d'études supérieures". The Decree of the 2 May 1925 created in each faculty of Law 4 DES: DES in Roman Law and Legal history, DES in Private Law, DES in public Law and DES in Politics and Economics. It required students to obtain two of them undergraduate studies to be able to begin a doctorate (PhD). In 1964, the undergraduate studies took 4 years (4-year licence, and eventually 3-year licence and a one-year maîtrise) and only one DES was necessary to begin a doctorate. 2 additional DES are created in each faculty: DES in Criminal Law and Politics and Economics are separated in two DES.

=== 1970: Dissolution ===
Following the events of May 1968, the faculties of the University of Paris became independent universities

Most law professors (88 out of 108) decided to perpetuate the faculty of law and economics within the same two buildings (Panthéon and Assas). Therefore, they created the "University of Law, Economics and social sciences of Paris" (Université de droit, d'économie et de sciences sociales de Paris), administratively shortened as Paris II, and currently named Panthéon-Assas University, which is therefore considered as its direct inheritor. Panthéon-Assas inherited the teaching programs and research centers from the Faculty of Law. Some joined interdisciplinary universities in Paris, like Panthéon-Sorbonne University, Paris Descartes University, Paris-East Créteil University (these names were formed later), or outside Paris.

Likewise, most of its professors in economics (35 out of 41) preferred to join the multidisciplinary university, Paris I, later called Panthéon-Sorbonne University while others joined Panthéon-Assas University, Paris Dauphine University, Paris Descartes University (currently Paris Cité University) and Paris-East Créteil University.

== Campuses ==
In 1680, Louis XIV decided to place the faculty of law at the Royal College.

In 1753, Louis XV decided that a new building would be constructed for the faculty of law on the place du Panthéon. Jacques-Germain Soufflot, alumnus of the faculty who had become the architect of the King designed and supervised the construction. It took place from 1771 to 1773 and the new building opened in 1774.

In the 1950s, a new building was constructed rue d'Assas in Paris. It was designed by Charles Lemaresquier, Alain le Normand and François Carpentier to accommodate the growing number of students at the University of Paris. It was built between 1959 and 1963 on the former grounds of Société Marinoni. At the time of its inauguration, its main lecture theatre was the largest in France, with 1,700 seats

== Notable faculty ==
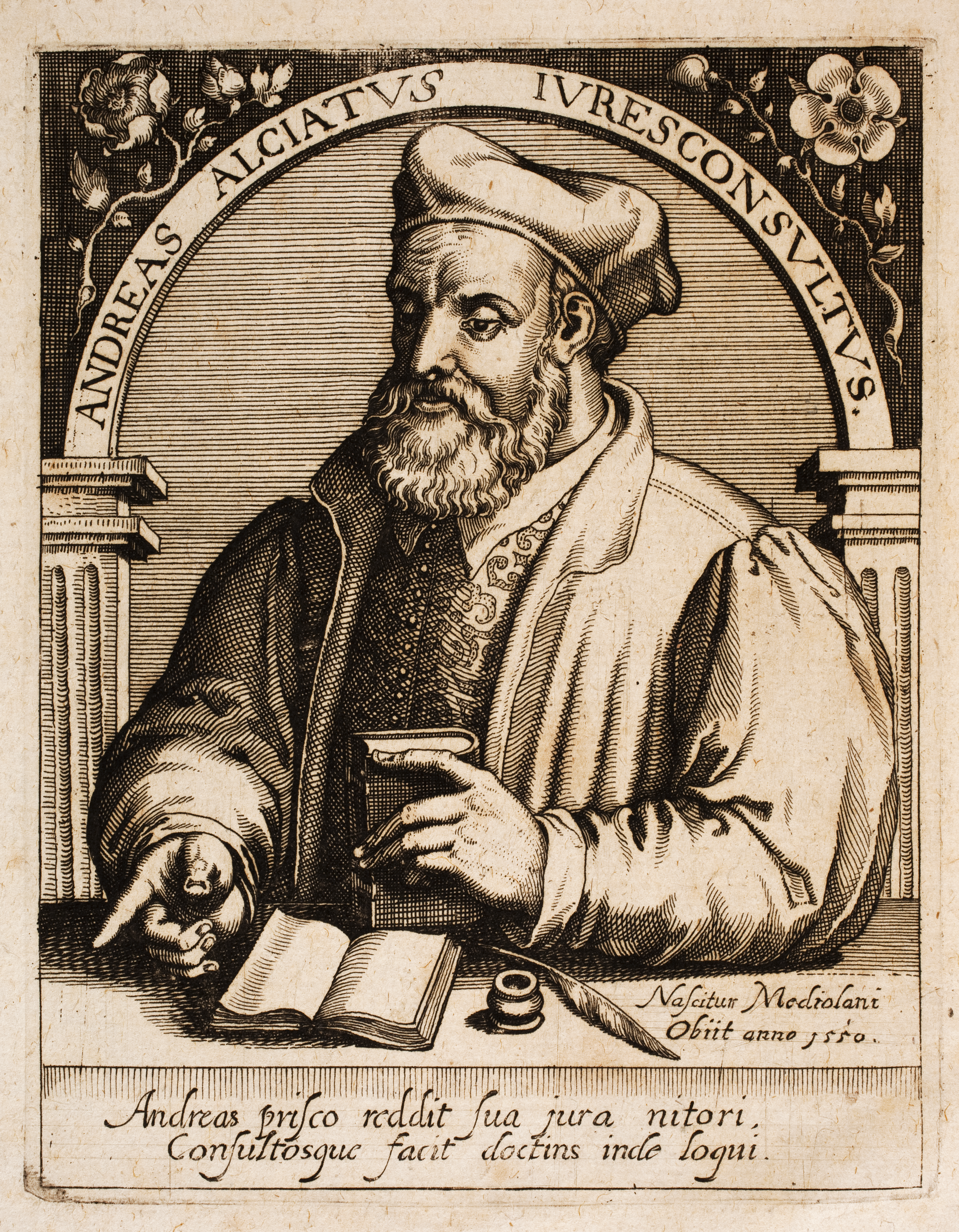
Andrea Alciato, founder of legal humanism

=== 1100–1679 ===
- Andrea Alciato, founder of legal humanism

=== 1679–1793 ===
- Mathieu-Antoine Bouchaud, author of the French Enlightenment and professor of law at the Paris Law Faculty

=== 19th century ===
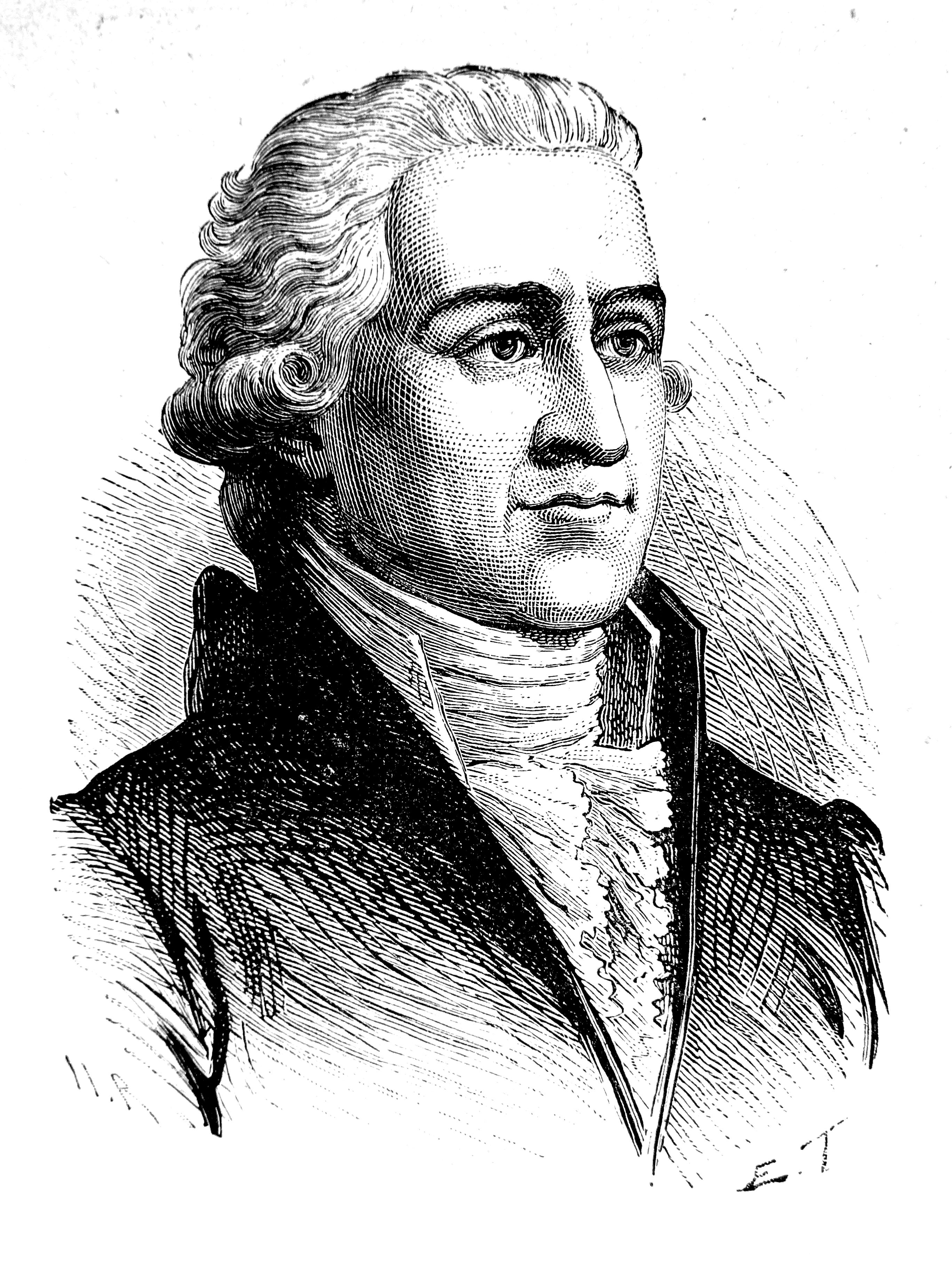
Francois Denis Tronchet, president of the commission for the creation of the French Civil Code and lawyer of Louis XVI at his trial

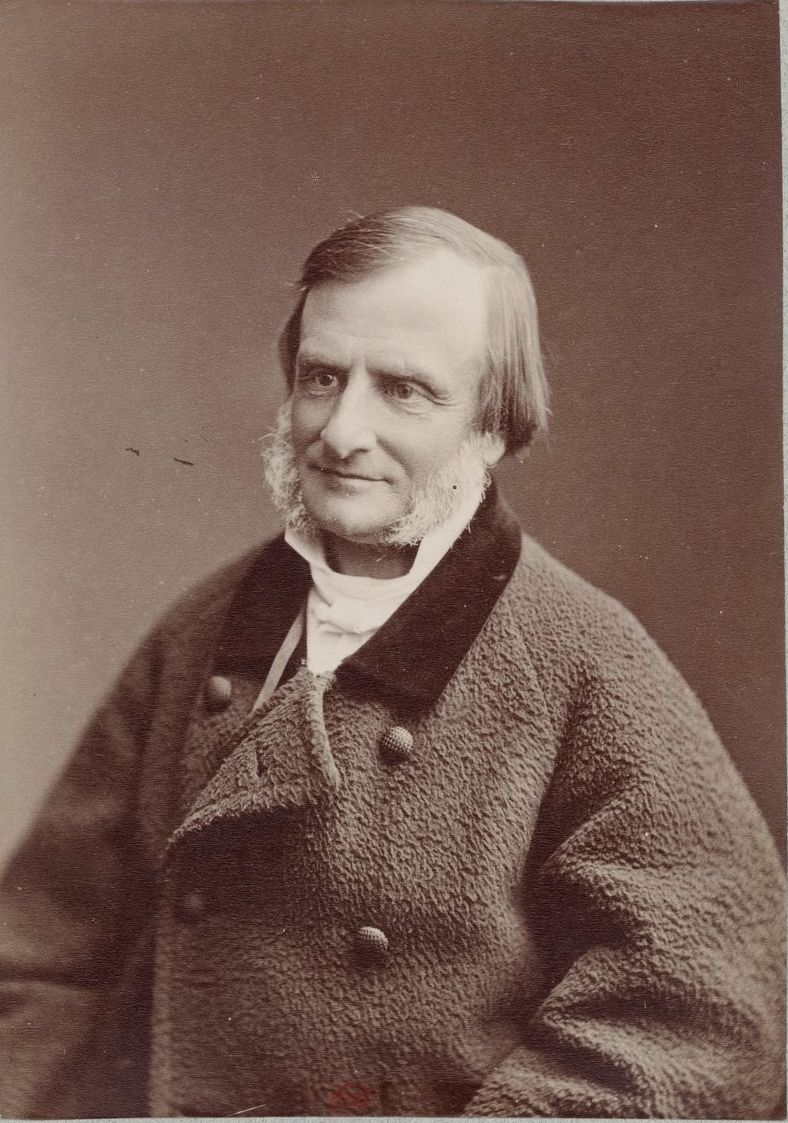
Émile Acollas, one of the founders of the League of Peace and Freedom

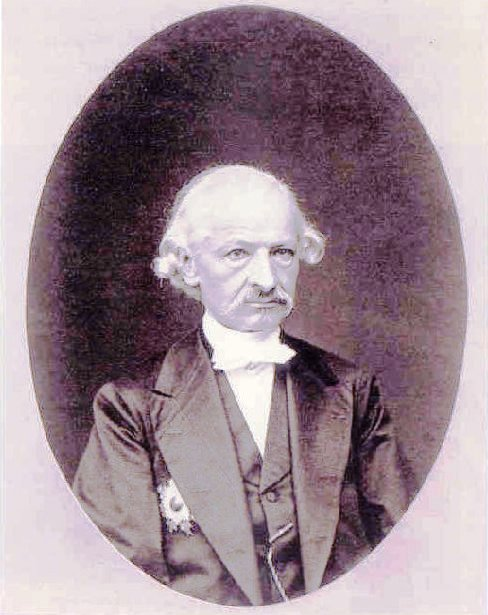
Gustave Boissonade, builder of the Japanese Civil Law during the Meiji Era

- Francois Denis Tronchet, president of the commission for the creation of the French Civil Code and lawyer of Louis XVI at his trial (with Malesherbes and Deseze)
- Claude-Étienne Delvincourt, also mentioned by Victor Hugo in Les Misérables as professor of Marius Pontmercy
- Joseph Louis Elzéar Ortolan
- Paul Gide and Charles Gide, father and uncle of André Gide, Nobel Prize in Literature 1947
- Gustave Boissonade, builder of the Japanese Civil Law during the Meiji Era
- Émile Acollas, one of the founders of the League of Peace and Freedom
- Louis Renault

=== 20th century ===
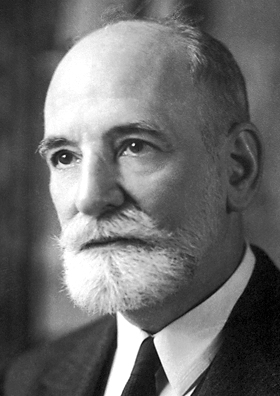
René Cassin, co-author of the Universal Declaration of Human Rights, Nobel Peace Prize, soldier during WW2

- Gaston Jèze, French academic, humanitarian and human rights activist (including during WW2)
- André Weiss
- Boris Mirkin-Getzevich
- René Cassin, known for co-authoring the Universal Declaration of Human Rights, receiving the Nobel Peace Prize, soldier during WW2
- Georges Ripert
- Henri Mazeaud (1939–1971, later professor emeritus from Paris II), twin brother of Léon Mazeaud, resistant to Nazi Germany and deported to Buchenwald
- Léon Mazeaud, (1941–1970), twin brother of Henri Mazeaud, resistant to Nazi Germany and deported to Buchenwald, dead in a hiking accident
- René Capitant, minister of Justice after WW2
- René David (1945–1968, went in 1968 to Aix-Marseille University until 1976), one of the most prominent professors of comparative law in the world in the 20th century, honorary degrees from the University of Edinburgh, Brussels, Ottawa, Basel, Leicester and Helsinki, recipient of the Amnesty International's Erasmus Prize in 1976.
- Suzanne Bastid (1947–1977, Paris II from 1971) was the first woman professor of Law of France, the first woman to be a member of the Académie des sciences morales et politiques Secretary General of the Institute of International Law (Nobel prize 1904).
- Georges Vedel (1949–1979, Paris II from 1971), former member of the Constitutional Council of France
- Jean Carbonnier (1955–1976, Paris II from 1971), one of the most famous French professors in Law of the 20th Century.
- Gérard Cornu (born 1967, Paris II from 1971), who wrote the new French Code of Civil Procedure in the late 1970s and is also well known in France for his Dictionary of Legal Vocabulary, translated in English.
- François Terré (1969–1999, Paris II from 1971), president in 2008 of the legal section of the Académie des sciences morales et politiques, head of the private committee for the reform of French Law of Obligations.
- Jacques Robert (1969–1979, Paris II from 1971), former member of the Constitutional Council of France

== Notable alumni (1100–1679) ==
Alumni of the Paris Law Faculty: Classical Ages

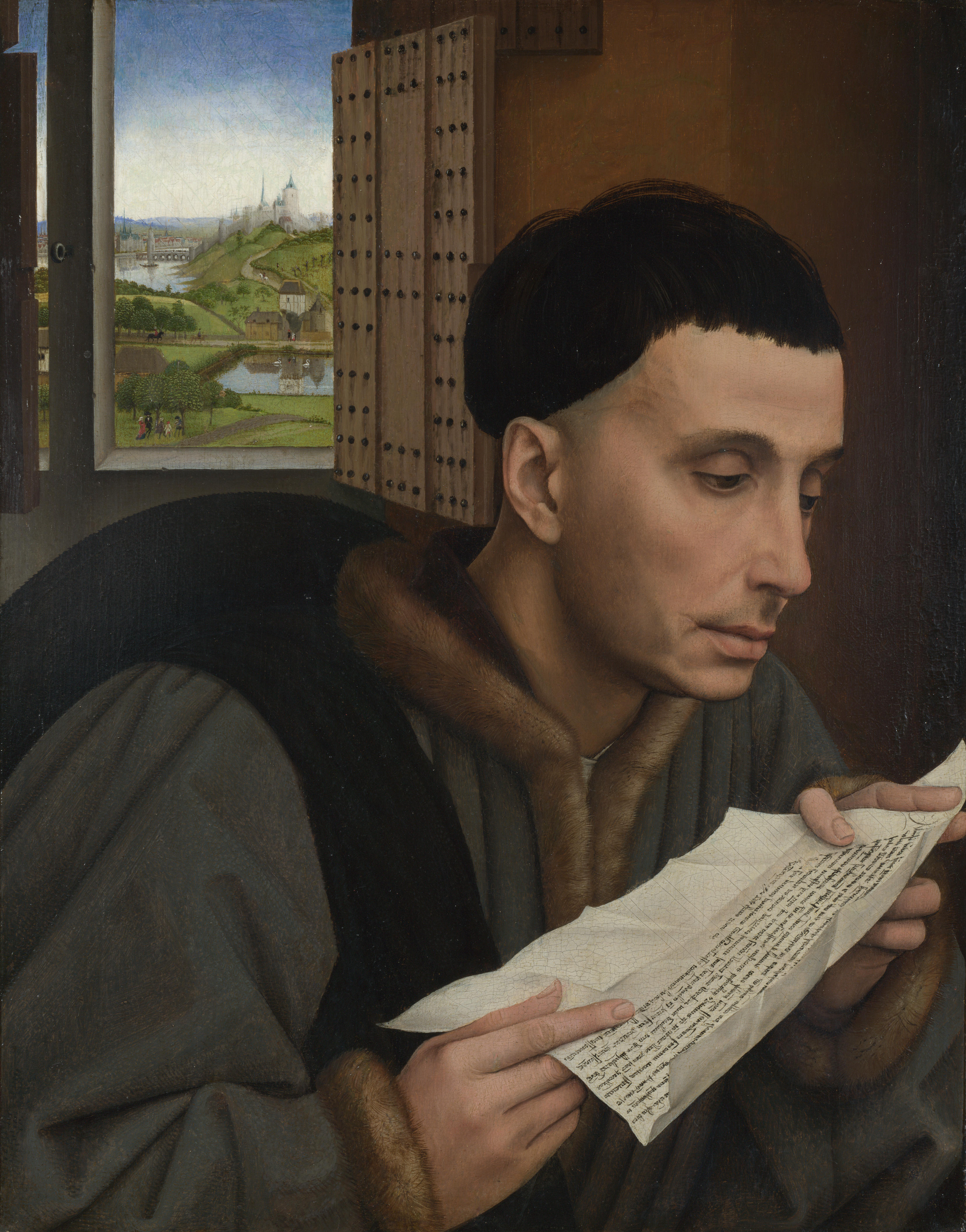
Saint Ivo, patron of the lawyers and of abandoned children, "Advocate of the Poor"

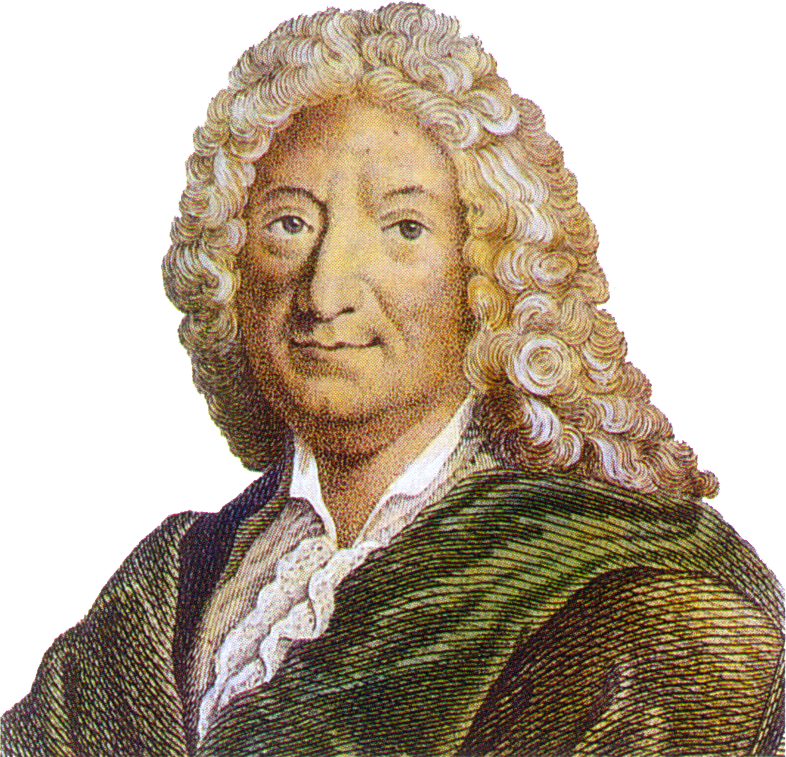
Alain-René Lesage, author of Gil Blas

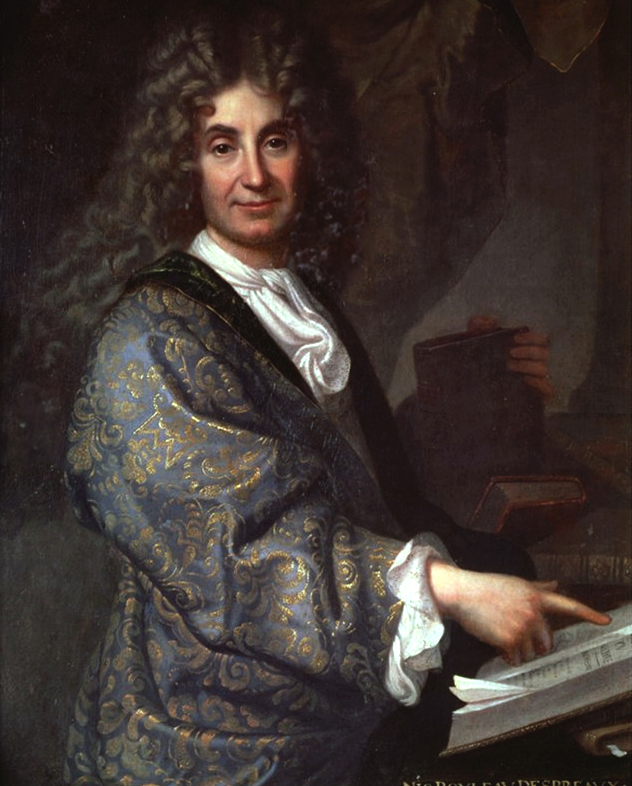
Nicolas Boileau, one of the builders of French poetry

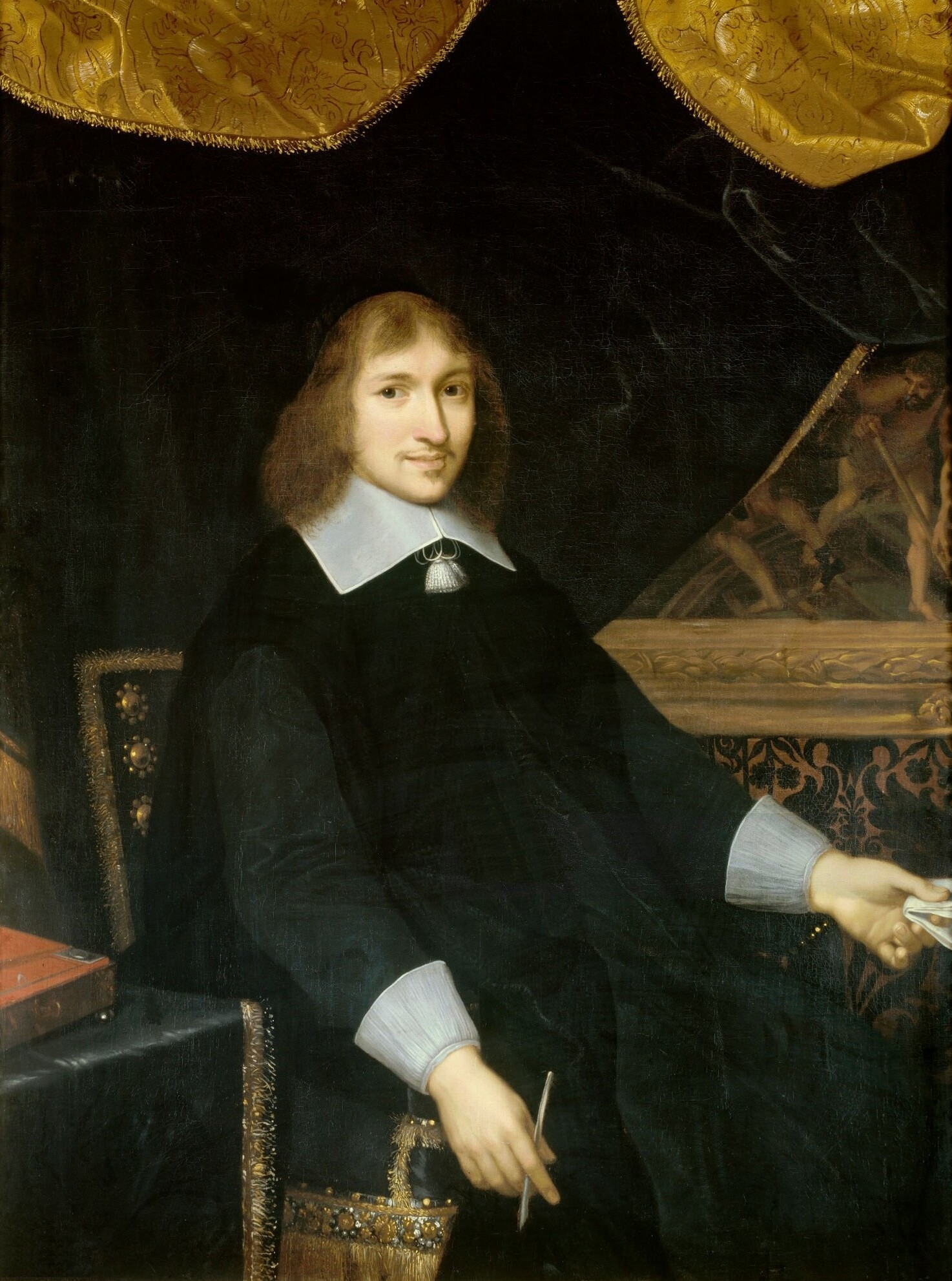
Nicolas Fouquet, Superintendent of Finances under Louis XIV

The Pope forbade the teaching of Roman law in Paris in 1223 with the decretal Super Specula. Until the reintroduction of Roman Law (civil law) by Louis XIV, people who wanted to learn civil law (Roman Law) and become lawyers would usually go to the nearby faculty of Law of the University of Orléans. Hence, Molière, Calvin, Perrault, Cujas, Rabelais, Fermat, La Boétie and others went to the latter.

- Saint Ivo, patron of the lawyers of abandoned children, and of Brittany, "Advocate of the Poor"
- Nicolas Boileau, one of the builders of French poetry
- Julius Caesar, Chancellor of the Exchequer
- Nicolas Fouquet, Superintendent of Finances under Louis XIV
- Alain-René Lesage, author of Gil Blas
Alumni of the Paris Law Faculty: French Enlightment

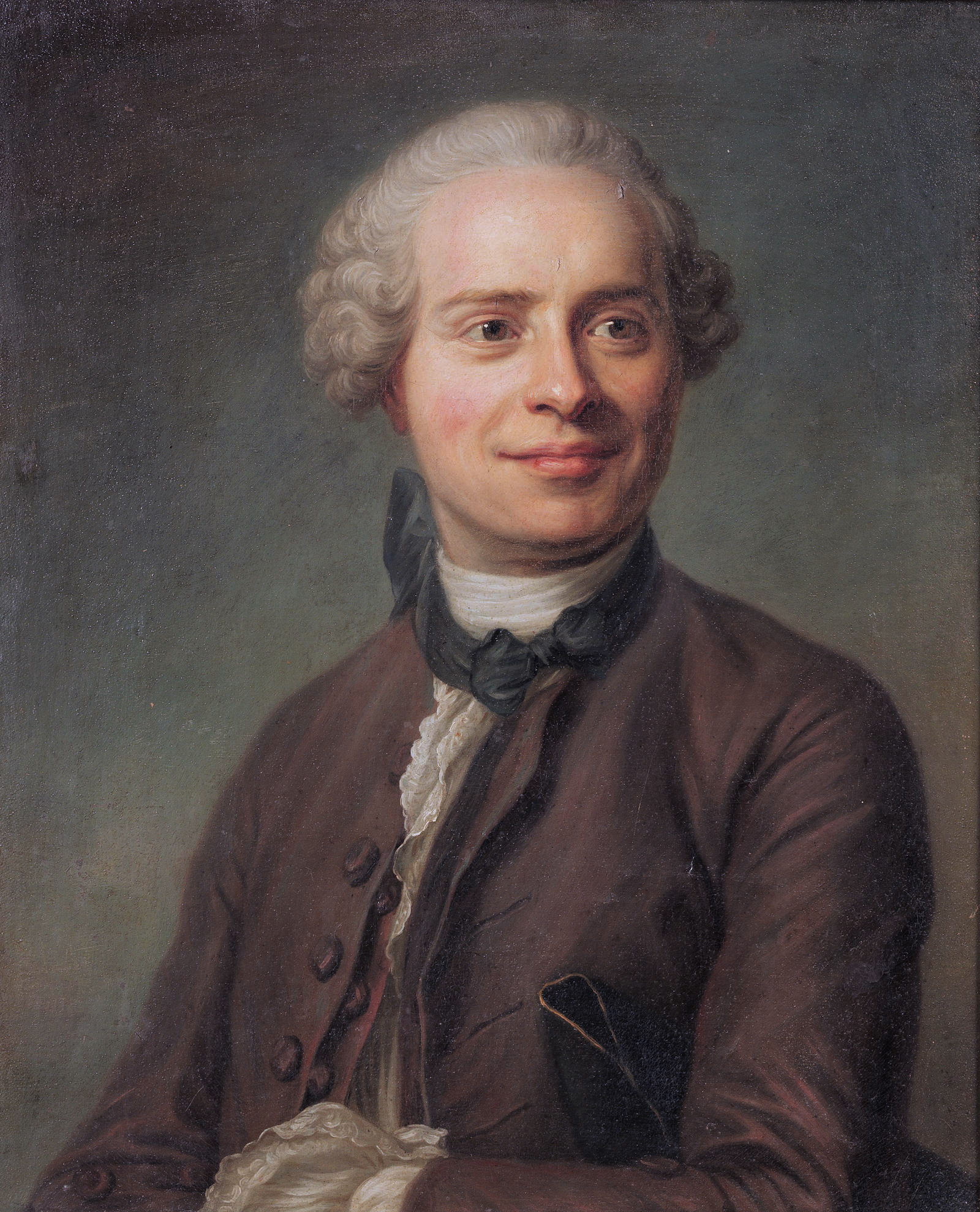
Jean le Rond d'Alembert, mathematician, physicist and philosopher

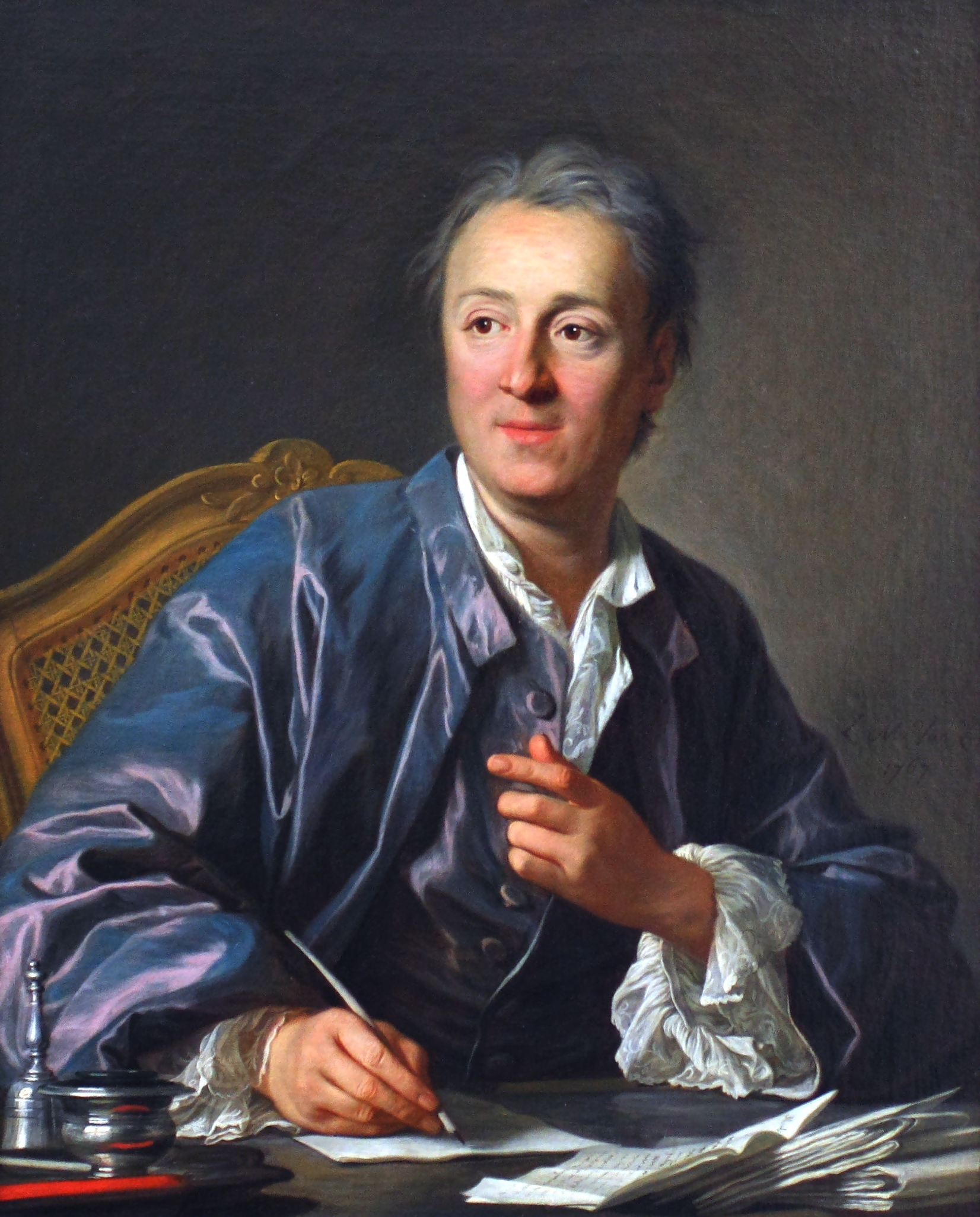
Denis Diderot, co-creator with d'Alembert of the Encyclopédie

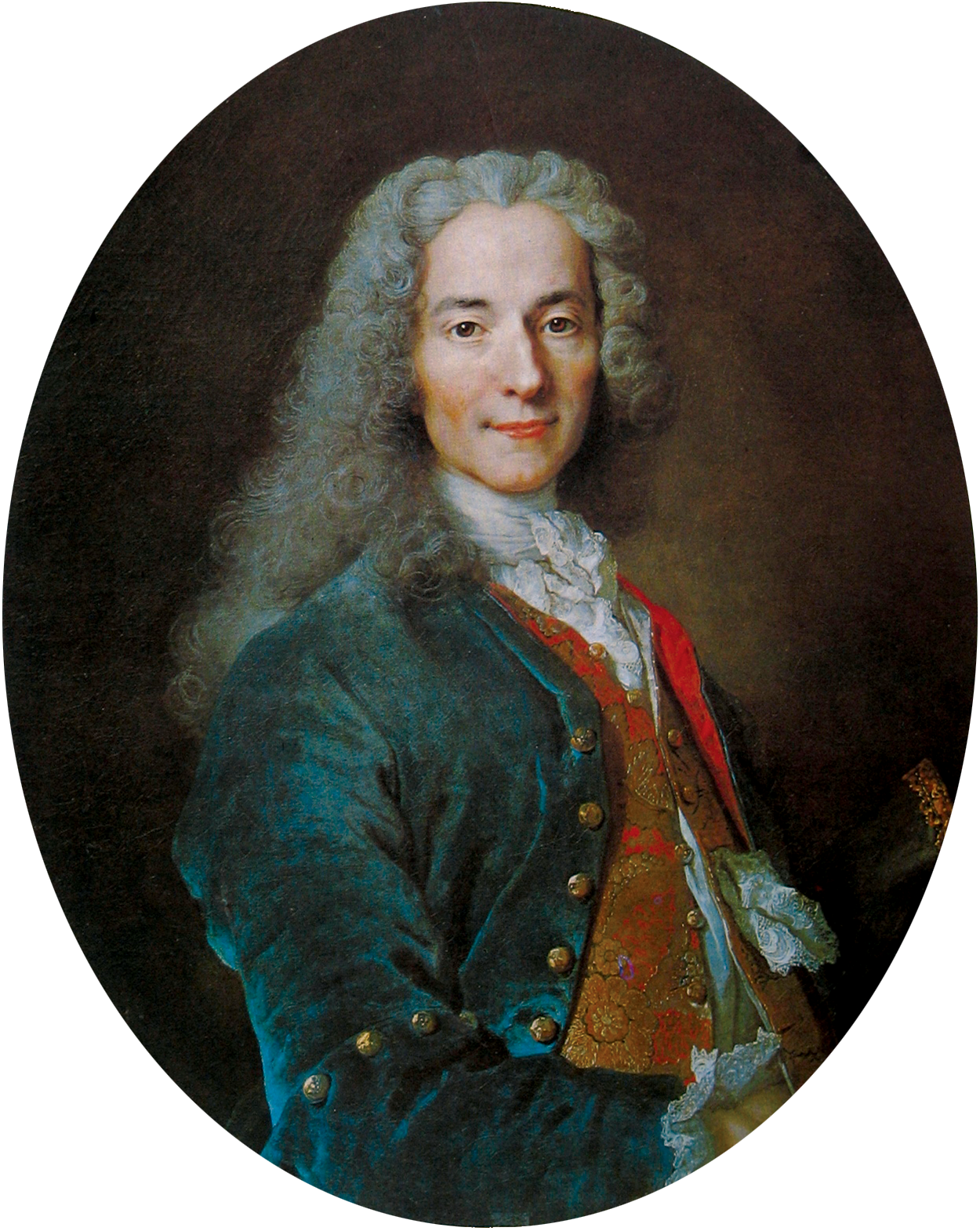
Voltaire, author of the French Enlightenment

== Notable alumni (1679–1793) ==
- Voltaire
- Mathieu-Antoine Bouchaud, author of the French Enlightenment
- Jean le Rond d'Alembert, co-creator with Diderot of the Encyclopédie (creating the concept of encyclopedia)
- Denis Diderot, co-creator with d'Alembert of the Encyclopédie
- Étienne Pascal, father and instructor of Blaise Pascal
- Maximilien Robespierre, prominent member of the French Revolution
- Camille Desmoulins, member of the French Revolution
Alumni of the Paris Law Faculty: Prominent intellectuals (after the Revolution)

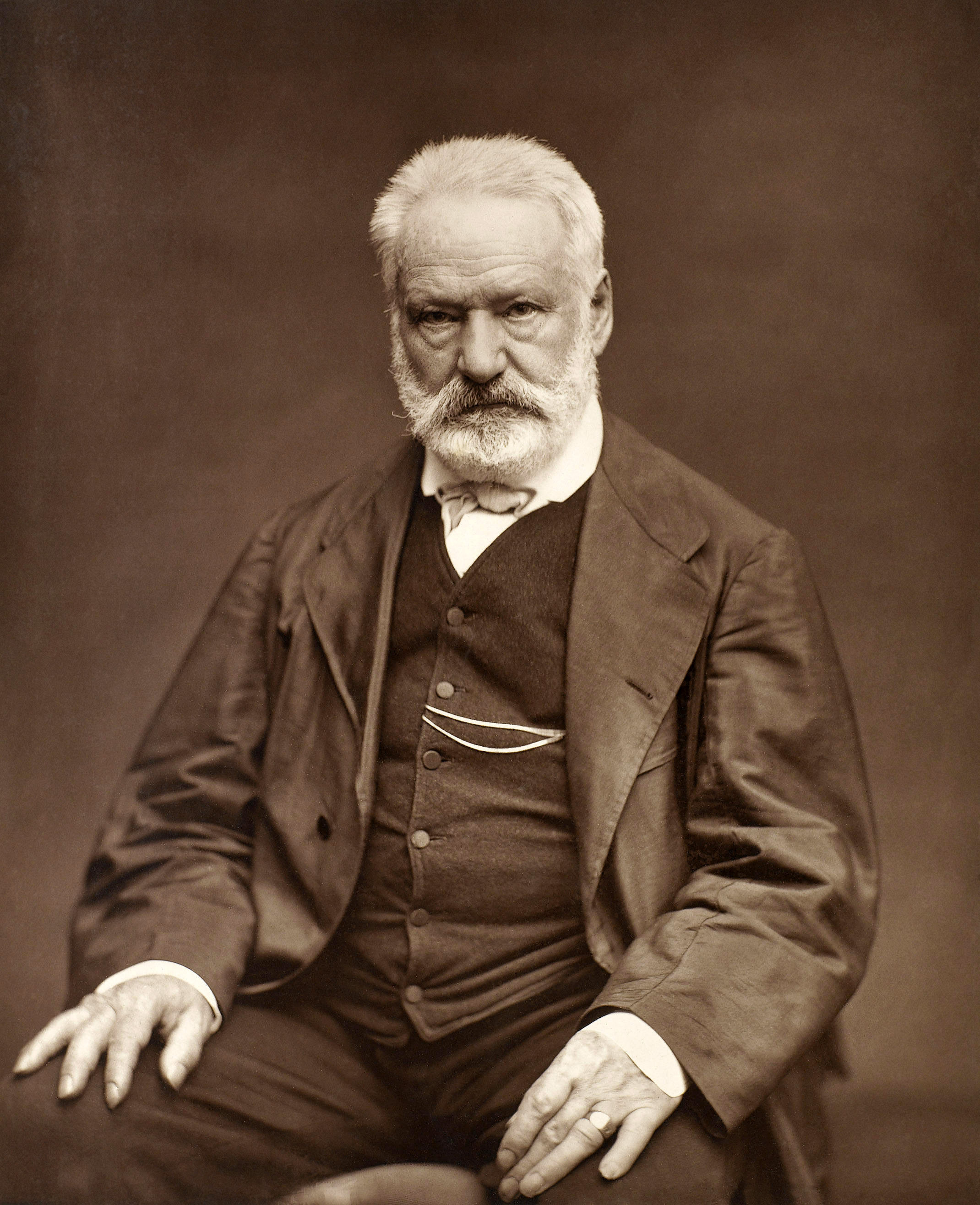
Victor Hugo, author of Les Misérables and most influential French intellectual in French modern history

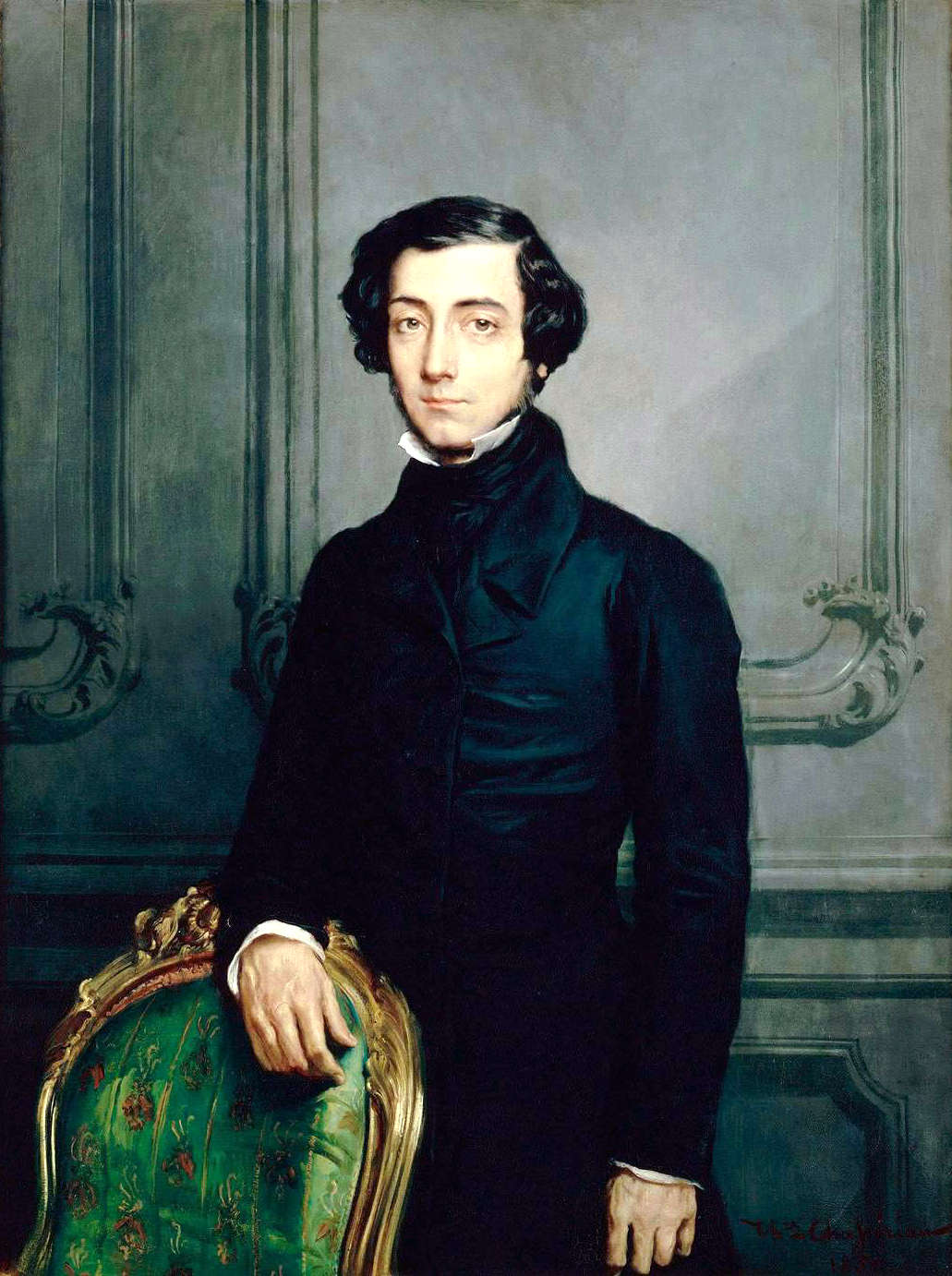
Alexis de Tocqueville, author of Democracy in America

Alumni of the Paris Law Faculty: Judiciary and lawyers

Henri Donnedieu de Vabres, French judge at the Nuremberg trials

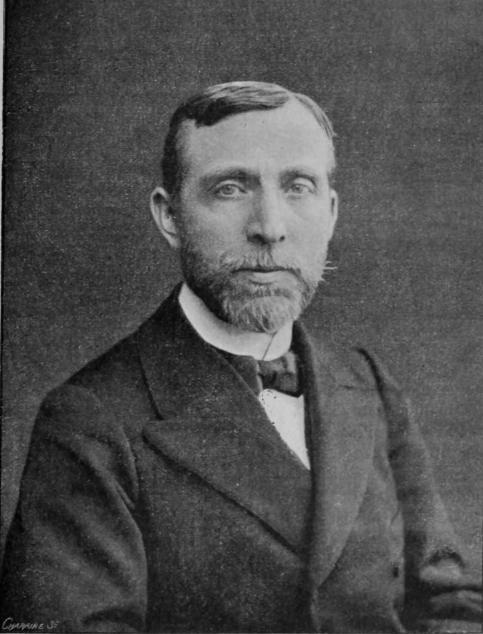
Louis Leblois, magistrate and lawyer of Alfred Dreyfus

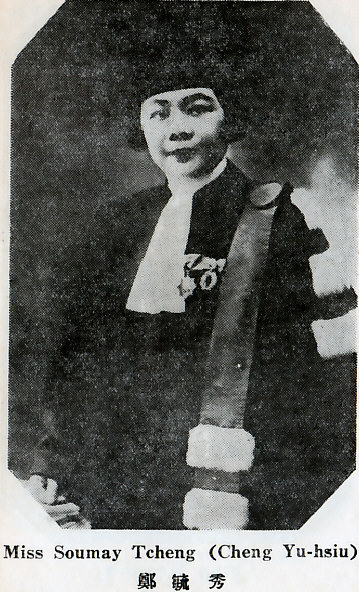
Tcheng Yu-hsiu, first female lawyer and judge in Chinese history

== Notable alumni (1802–1970) ==
=== Intellectuals ===
- Victor Hugo
- Alexis de Tocqueville

=== Law professors ===
- Manuel Alejandro Álvarez Jofré, Chilean professor of international law and a judge at the International Court of Justice
- Henri Batiffol
- Raymond Carré de Malberg
- Lev Kasso, Russian professor of law and secretary of public instruction
- Gustave Boissonade
Alumni of the Paris Law Faculty: Women and the law

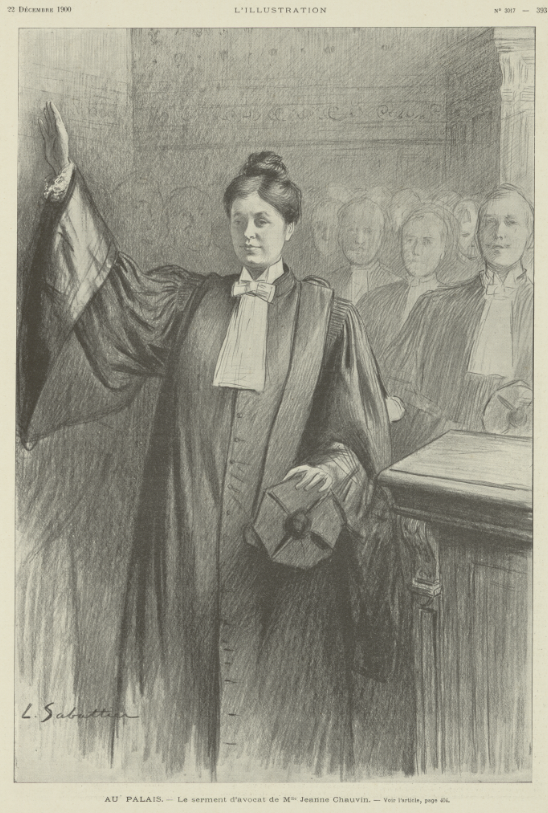
Jeanne Chauvin, first woman to lead at the bar in France

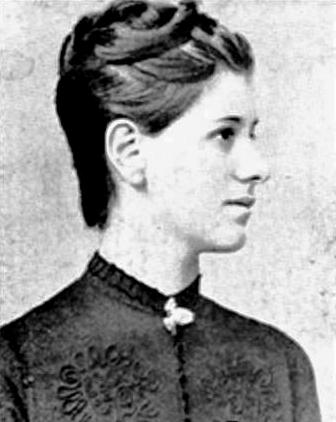
Sarmiza Bilcescu, first female student in law of France, first PhD in law of France

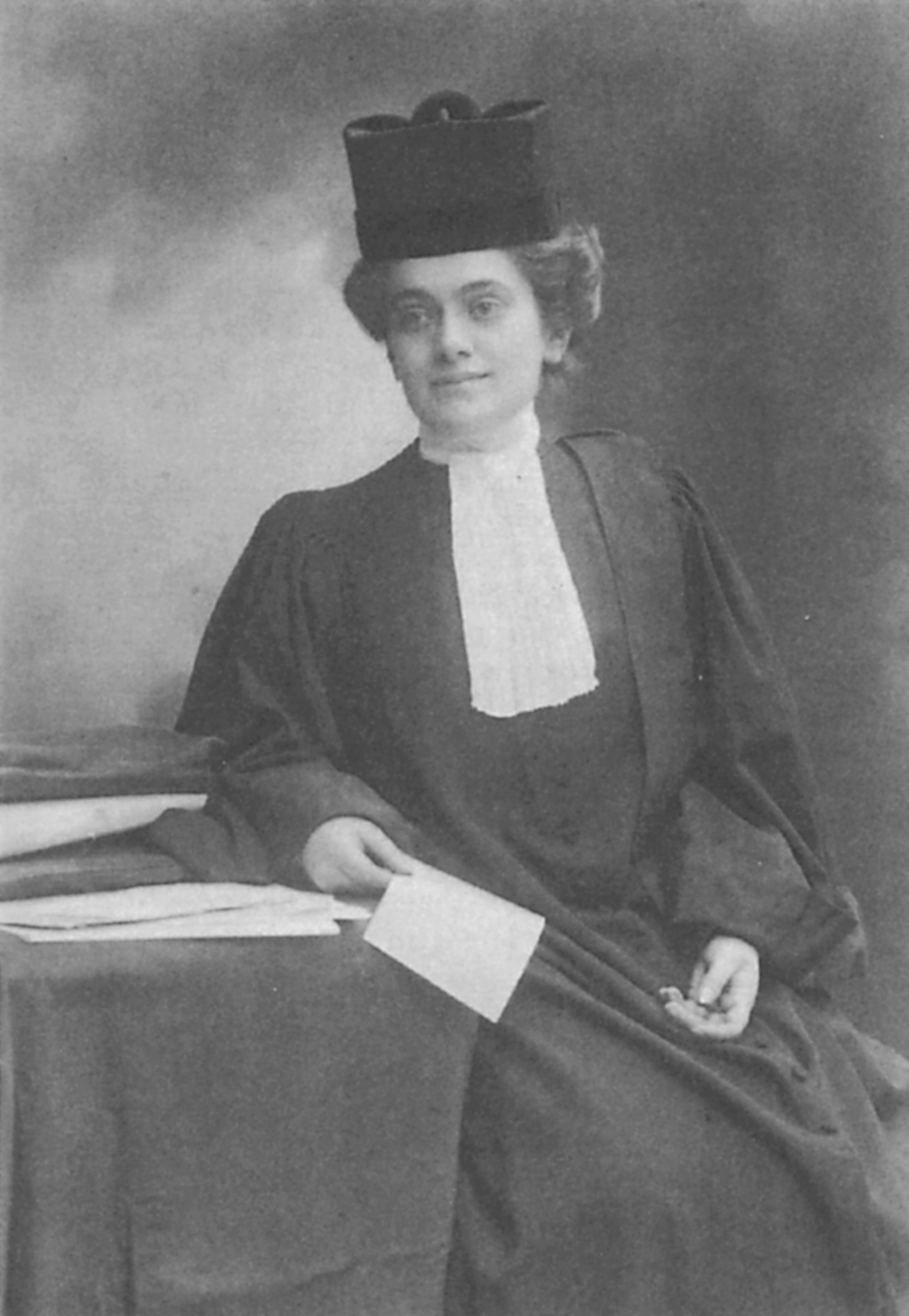
Olga Petit, first woman to take the oath to become barrister in France

=== Judiciary and lawyers ===
Lawyers who are more well known as politicians are listed in the section about politicians.

- Sarmiza Bilcescu, first female student in law in France and first female doctor of law in France
- Jeanne Chauvin, first woman to lead at the bar in France
- Henri Donnedieu de Vabres, French judge at the Nuremberg trials
- Louis Henri Barboux, lawyer for Sarah Bernhardt in her 1880 breach-of-contract suit against the Comédie-Française
- Louis Leblois, magistrate and lawyer of Alfred Dreyfus, symbolic French antisemitism case
- Fernand Labori, lawyer of Alfred Dreyfus
- Paul Magnaud, prominent magistrate
- Rodolphe-Madeleine Cleophas Dareste de La Chavanne
- Mireille Ndiaye
- Kiva Ornstein, prominent Romanian lawyer and activist
- Olga Petit, first woman to take the oath to become barrister in France
- Simone Rozès, first female president of the French Court of Cassation (highest position for a judge in France)
- Jacques Vergès, prominent French lawyer
- Tcheng Yu-hsiu, first female lawyer and judge in Chinese history
Alumni of the Paris Law Faculty: Literature, arts and other sciences

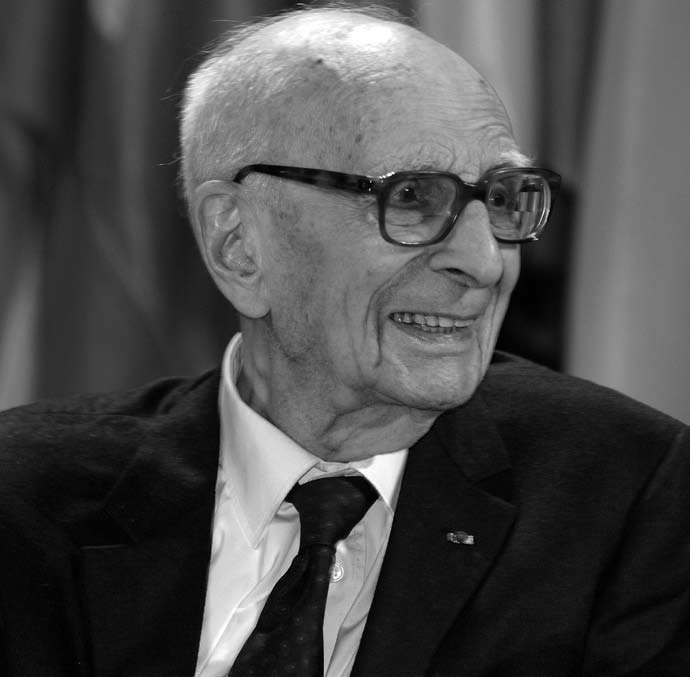
Claude Lévi-Strauss, "father of modern anthropology"

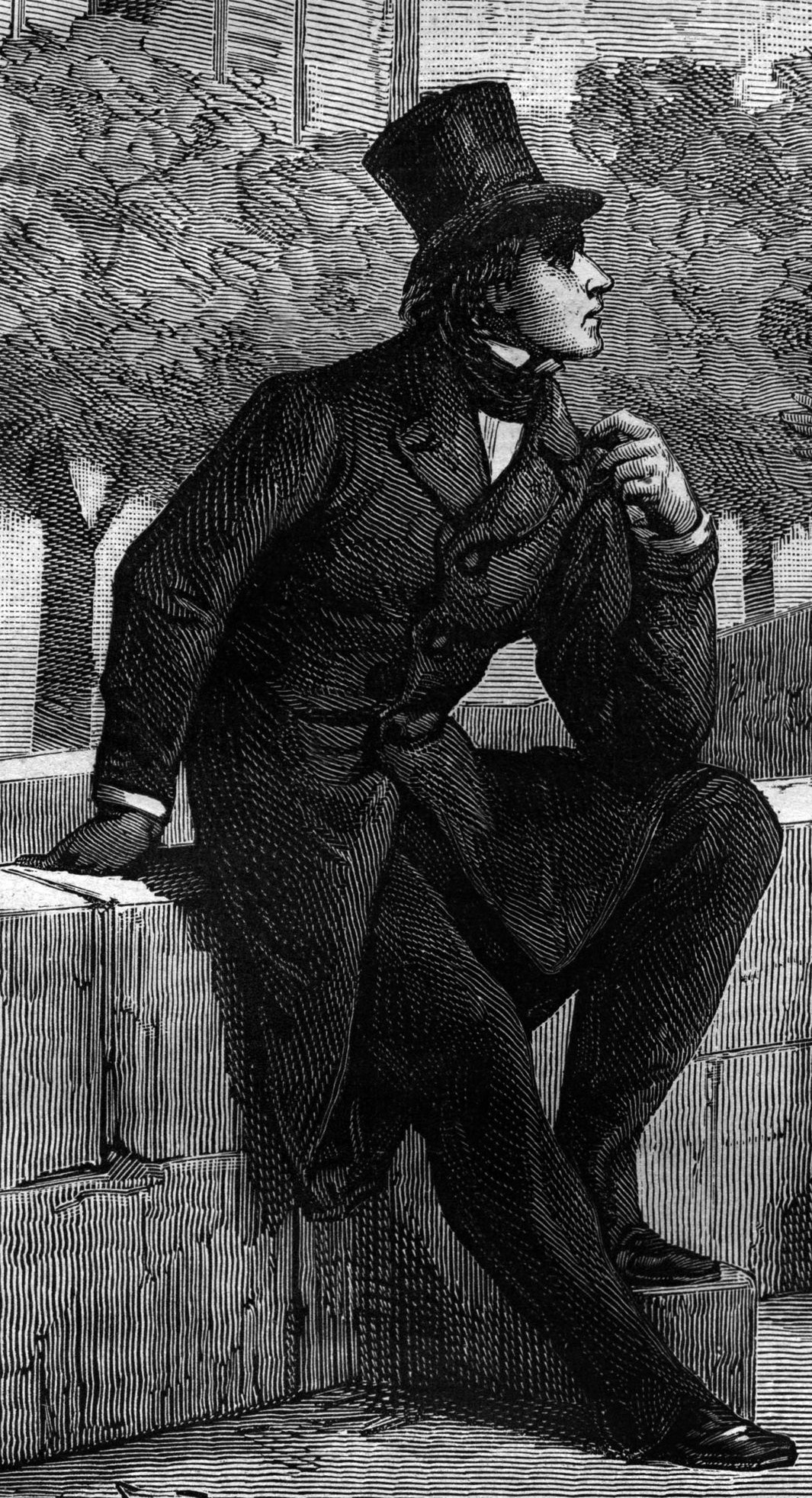
Marius Pontmercy, fictional lawyer, from Les Misérables

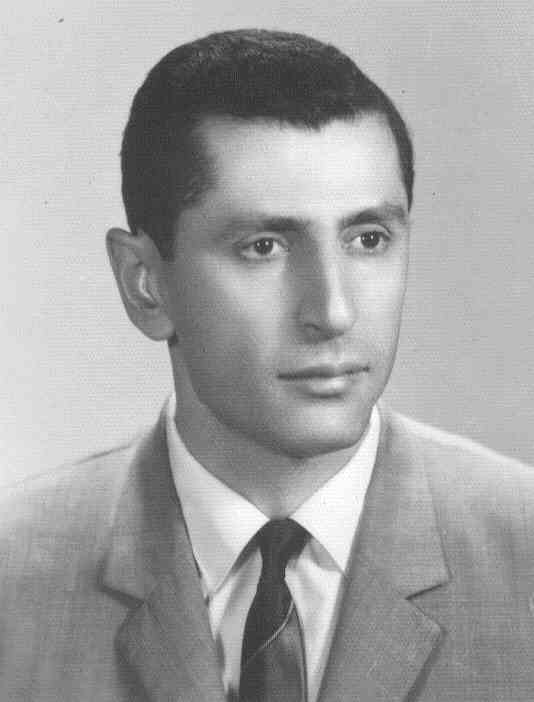
Dariush Safvat, music master

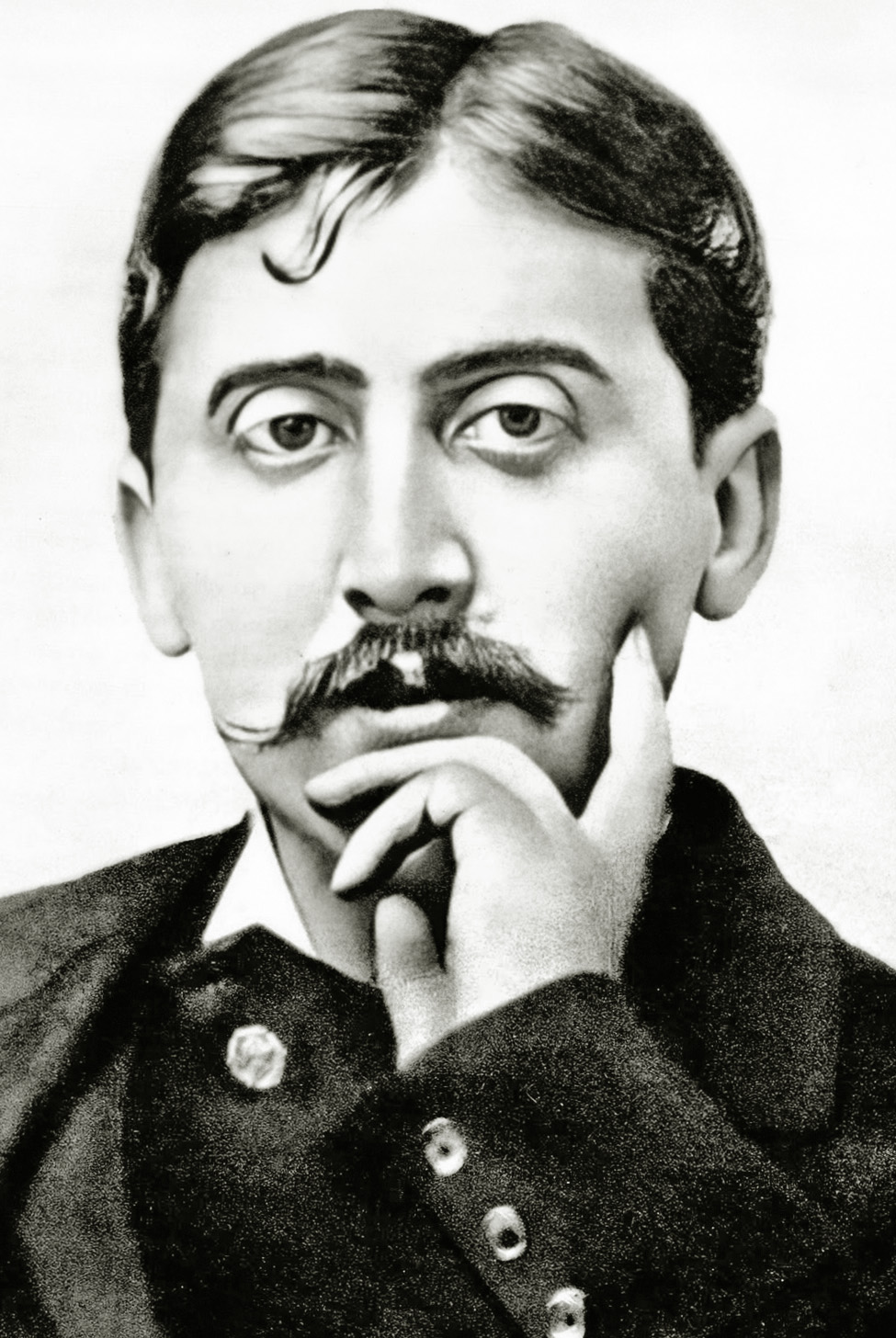
Marcel Proust, author of In Search of Lost Time

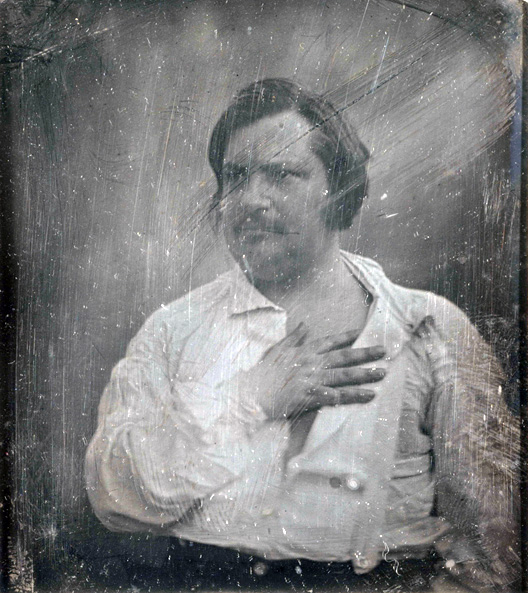
Honoré de Balzac, author of La Comédie Humaine series

=== Literature, arts and social activism ===
- Honoré de Balzac, prominent author
- René Bazin, prominent author
- Gustave Flaubert, author of Madame Bovary
- Marcel Proust, author of In Search of Lost Time
- Anne Ancelin Schützenberger, psychologist
- Jean Aubert, engineer
- Jacques Bainville, journalist and historian
- Alfred Binet, psychologist
- Henri Burin des Roziers, priest and social activist
- Charles Champoiseau, archeologist
- Éric de Dampierre, ethnologist
- Émile Dard, historian
- Henri de Gaulle, teacher, father of Charles de Gaulle (president of France)
- Gaëtan Duval, activist
- Dariush Safvat, music master
- Raphaël Salem, Raphaël Salem, Greek mathematician whose name gave the Salem numbers, the Salem–Spencer sets and the Salem Prize
- Claude Lévi-Strauss, "father of modern anthropology"
Alumni of the Paris Law Faculty: French and World Politics

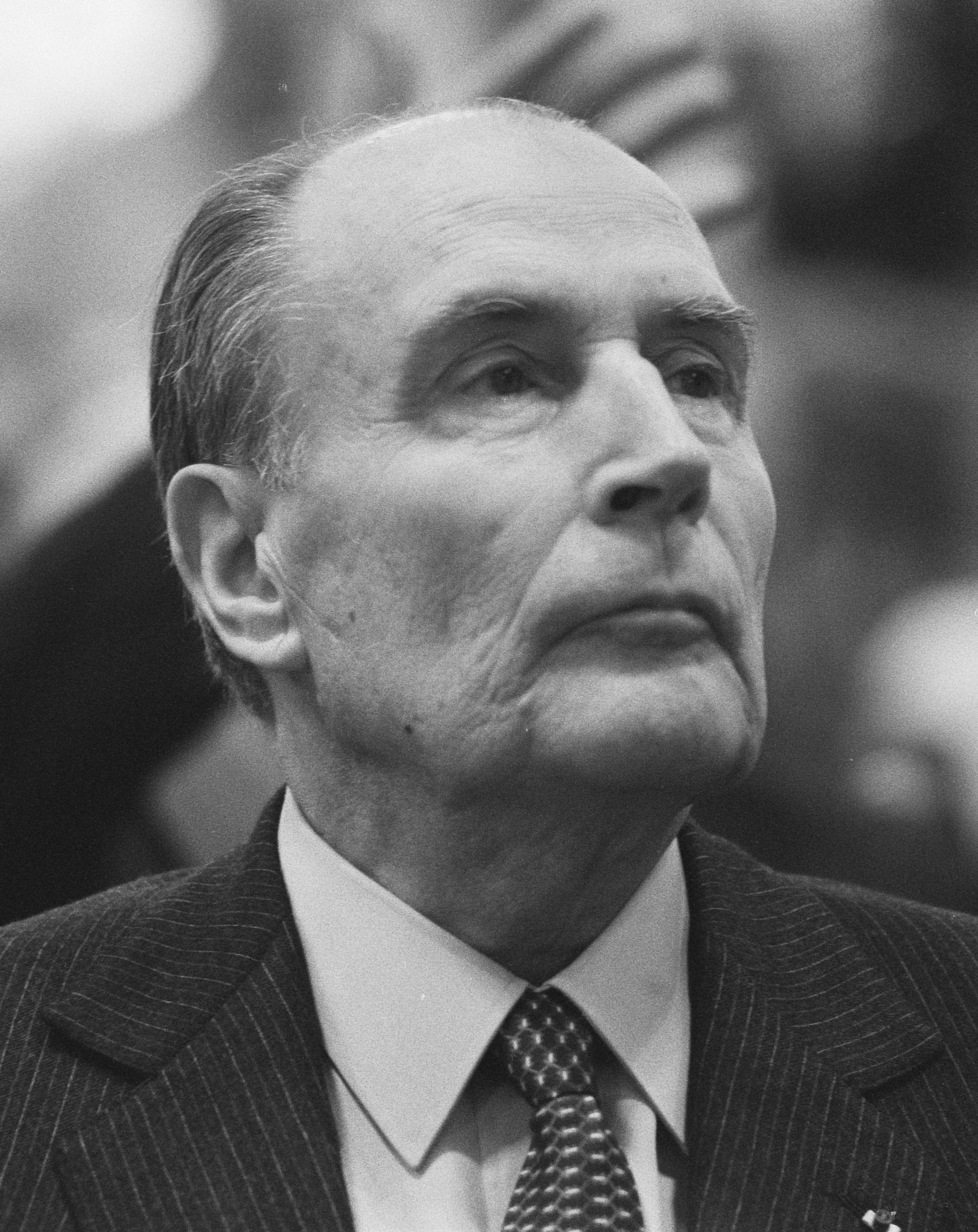
François Mitterrand, president of France for 14 years

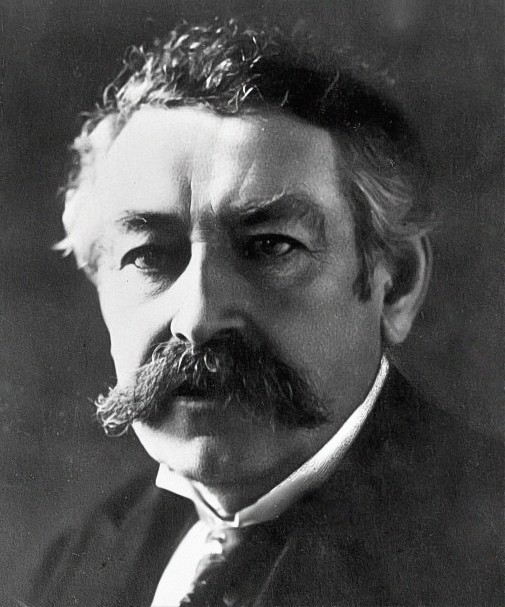
Aristide Briand, prime minister, Nobel Peace Prize 1926

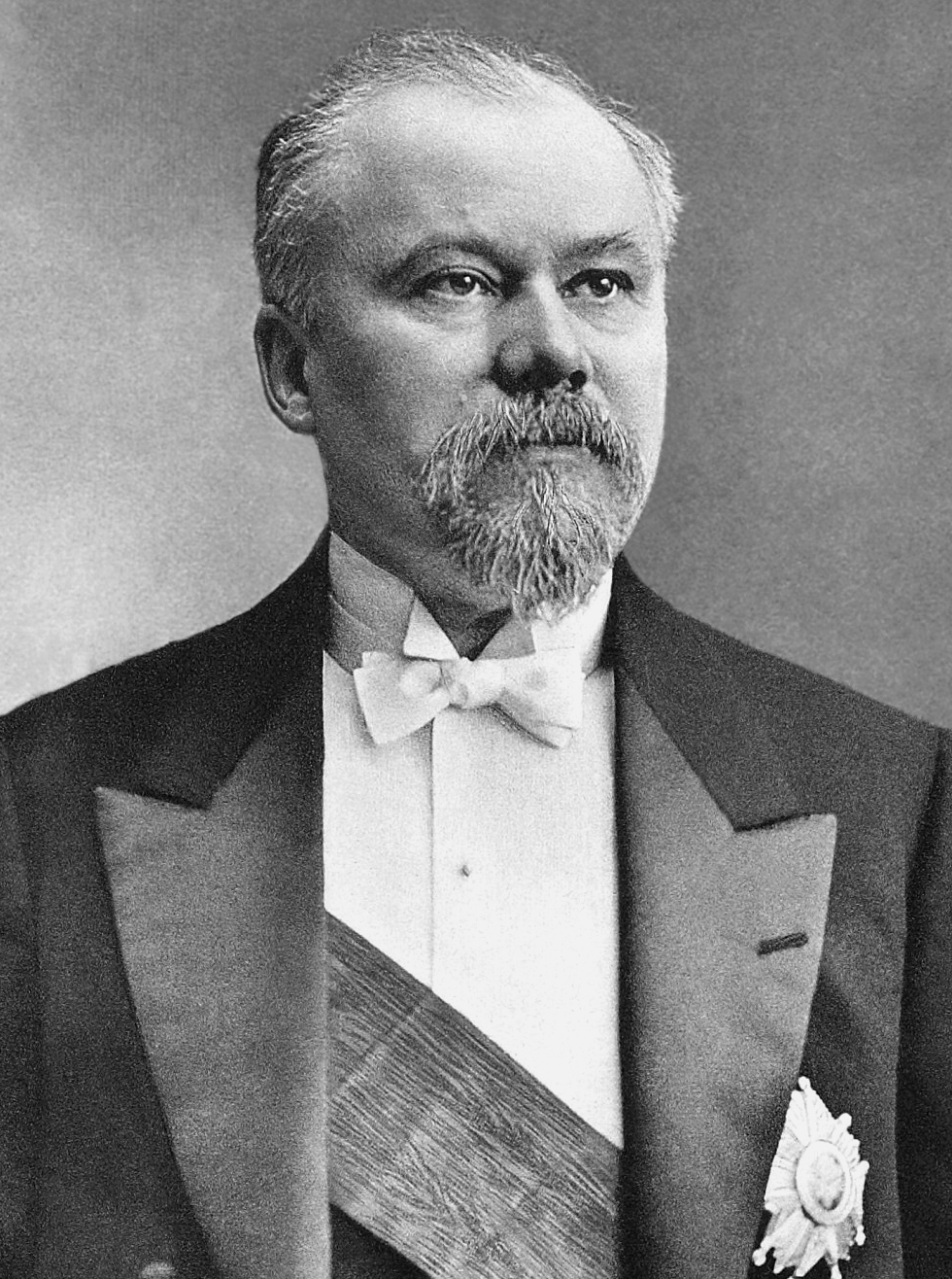
Raymond Poincaré, president of France during World War I and prime minister

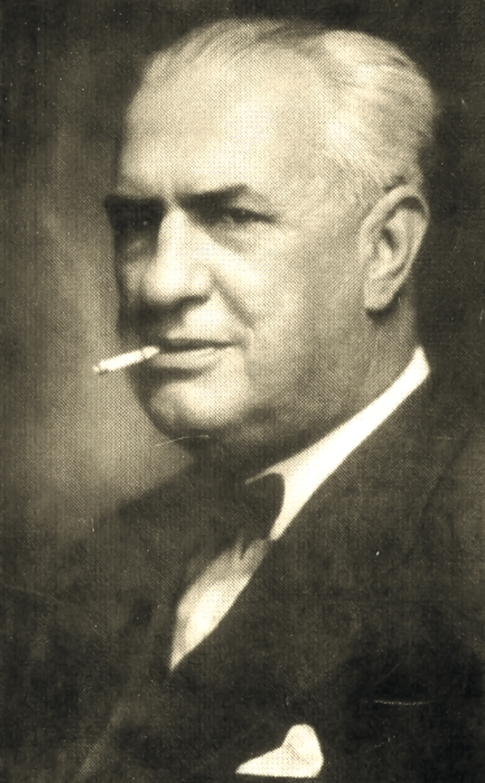
Constantin Argetoianu, prime minister of Romania, died in prison without trial

Shapour Bakhtiar, last prime minister of Iran before the Islamic Republic, assassinated in 1991

=== Politics and military ===
==== France: presidents ====
- François Mitterrand, president for 14 years
- Jean Casimir-Perier, president and prime minister, involved in the Dreyfus affair against antisemitism
- Raymond Poincaré, president during World War I and prime minister

==== France: prime ministers ====
- Aristide Briand, prime minister, Nobel Peace Prize 1926
- Léon Gambetta, prime minister, influential during the Franco-Prussian War and in the restoration of the Republic in France
- Jules Grévy, prime minister
- Michel Debré, prime minister
- Pierre Messmer, prime minister
- Maurice Couve de Murville, prime minister
- Henri Brisson, prime minister
- Maurice Bourgès-Maunoury, prime minister
- Léon Bourgeois, prime minister

==== France: other ====
- Jules Favre, opponent to Napoleon III
- Robert Badinter, minister of justice
- Gustave Rouland
- Simone Veil, minister of justice
- Pierre-Antoine Berryer, member of parliament and the Académie française
- Bernard Barberon, resistant to Nazi Germany
- Jean-Baptiste Biaggi, resistant and member of parliament
- Guy de Boysson, resistant
- Lucien Brun, prominent member of parliament of the French Third Republic
- Pierre Jacobsen, resistant and high-rank military
- Jean-Marie Le Pen, member of parliament

==== Outside of France ====
- Javad Ameri, Iranian minister of Interior
- Ali Amini, Prime Minister of Iran
- Constantin Argetoianu, prime minister of Romania
- Shapour Bakhtiar, last prime minister of Iran before the Islamic Republic, voluntary soldier during WW2 to help France, opponent to monarchy, to clerical rule and to the communists, assassinated in France by agents of the Islamic Republic in 1991
- Hassen Belkhodja, Tunisian secretary of state
- Habib Bourguiba Jr., Tunisian politician, son of Habib Bourguiba
- Boutros Boutros-Ghali, sixth secretary-general of the United Nations (UN)
- Armand Călinescu, prime minister of Romania
- Hasan Dosti, Albanian nationalist
- Abbas Ali Khalatbari, Iranian secretary of foreign affairs
- Gheorghe Mironescu
- Vũ Văn Mẫu, Minister of Foreign Affairs of the Republic of Vietnam and Prime Minister of the Republic of Vietnam
- Wei Tao-ming, Republic of China's ambassador to the United States during the Second World War

=== Fictional ===
- Marius Pontmercy, from Les Misérables

== Deans ==
- 1417- : Raoul Roussel
- Charles Giraud
- 1805-1809 : Louis-François Portiez
- 1809-1830 : Claude-Étienne Delvincourt
- 1830-1843 : Hyacinthe Blondeau
- 1843-1845 : Pellegrino Rossi
- 1845-1846 : Jacques Berriat-Saint-Prix
- 1846-1847 : Albert-Paul Royer-Collard
- 1847-1868 : Charles Auguste Pellat
- 1868-1879 : Gabriel Frédéric Colmet-Daâge
- 1879-1887 : Charles Beudant
- 1887-1896 : Edmond Colmet de Santerre
- 1896-1899 : Eugène Garsonnet
- 1899-1906 : Ernest Désiré Glasson
- 1906-1910 : Charles Lyon-Caen
- 1910-1913 : Paul Cauwès
- 1913-1922 : Ferdinand Larnaude
- 1922-1933 : Henry Berthélemy
- 1933-1938 : Edgard Allix
- 1937-1944 : Georges Ripert
- 1944-1955 : Léon Julliot de La Morandière
- 1962-1967 : Georges Vedel
- 1967-1970 : Alain Barrère

== Sources ==
- Abt, Lawrence Edwin; Riess, Bernard Frank, eds. (1966). Progress in Clinical Psychology. Grune & Stratton.
- Conac, Gérard (2005). "La fondation de l'université Paris I : François Luchaire, pilote d'une transition institutionnelle". In Bougrab, Jeannette; Maus, Didier (eds.). François Luchaire, un républicain au service de la République (in French). Publications de la Sorbonne. ISBN 978-2859445157.
- Décret n^{o} 70-928 du 8 octobre 1970 (in French).
