= Gaston Jèze =

French academic and humanitarian

Gaston Jèze (March 2, 1869, Toulouse – August 5, 1953, Deauville) was a French academic, humanitarian and human rights activist. He was a professor of public law and the resident of the International Law Institute.

During the 1930s, he served as legal counsel to Emperor Haile Selassie of Ethiopia, who had been deposed and exiled by the Italian Fascists. During World War II, he spoke out against the persecution of Jews and other minorities by Vichy France.

== A renowned academic ==
He was a leading proponent of and was largely responsible for promoting the establishment of finance as a separate discipline in the universities of France. He contributed to the shift in thinking from the notion of "power in the public sphere" to the idea of "public service". He taught at the Faculty of Law of Paris.

A specialist in public finance and administrative law, Jèze was one of the first academics to author a study of legal phenomena such as financial phenomena that takes into account all factors, whether legal, economic, financial, social or political .

In his work, he promoted the need for a careful and rational scientific study of the "facts" of a case or situation, carefully separated from the political points of view inevitably taken.

In economics, he is recognized as having made the public finances a real branch of economic analysis, especially through his "law of equilibrium", often called the "law of Jèze".

== Politics ==
During the 1919 elections, Jeze stood unsuccessfully as a candidate in Guadeloupe for the Colonial Socialist Party. He subsequently left politics completely.

In his academic work, Jèze, strongly and effectively made the case for democracy over authoritarian rule. Despite his belief in the superiority of democracy over dictatorship, he was no shallow and conformist ideologue, and his positions were deep, insightful and nuanced. According to him, "the benefits of democracy are mostly formal, that is to say related to the public and adversarial procedure that accompanies the decision."

He was a liberal and supporter of the Third Republic, but he did not hesitate to criticize the mistakes and "demagoguery" of governments, and he had little regard for the professional political bureaucracy of his time. In 1933, Jèze, with other noted academics René Capitant, René Cassin and Georges Ripert, became one of the first great French jurists to protest the anti-Semitic, racist and corporatist Nazi regime.

== Counsel to the Emperor of Ethiopia ==
In 1933 Monsieur Jèze became internationally renowned (outside of academic circles) for becoming the Legal Counsel to the Emperor of Ethiopia who was, at the time, negotiating with the Italian Fascists who wanted more favorable trading and residence rights for Italian citizens.

The Fascist dictator Benito Mussolini who secretly wanted to expand the Italian Empire by conquering Ethiopia used the negotiations to make demands unfavourable to Ethiopia and its citizens, which could not be feasibly met, as a pretext to move troops to the Ethiopian border.

The Italians, who had ulterior motives, consistently rebuffed all attempts at serious and equitable negotiations and thus having their demands predictably rejected by the Emperor, on Jèze's advice, declared war in 1935.

It was the start of the brutal Second Italo-Abyssinian War, during which the Italians committed numerous war crimes including the use of biological weapons. Following the war, Ethiopia became an Italian colony for the next 5 years and the emperor was exiled to London. Jèze remained the Emperor's legal Counsel until 1939.

During the negotiating period, he thus became the symbol of law and anticolonialism because of his oratory for and his championing of the Ethiopian cause before the Permanent Court of International Justice in The Hague.

His advocacy made him simultaneously became a target of right- wing nationalist organizations in France and abroad. Notably, on March 5, 1936, the French nationalist groups organised their biggest demonstration to date, demanding his resignation. That caused Jèze to hide throughout his stay in The Hague to avoid being the target of an assassination.

A notable participant in the demonstrations was François Mitterrand, a future leftwing socialist president of France.

== Notable works ==
(IN FRENCH)

- Cours de science des finances et de législation financière française, Giard, Paris 1922
- Cours de droit public, un vol. par année, Giard puis LGDJ, de 1913 jusqu'en 1936
- Éléments de la science des finances (1896 - rééd. plusieurs fois jusqu'en 1902) co-auteur Max Boucard
- Étude théorique et pratique sur l'occupation comme mode d'acquérir des territoires en droit international, thèse, Paris 1896
- Les dépenses de guerre de la France (PUF, 1926) (critique de la politique financière de la France pendant la Première Guerre mondiale)
- La Stabilisation des monnaies, (Paris 1932)
- Les principes généraux du droit administratif (3 volumes) : La technique juridique du droit public français (vol. 1); La notion de service public (vol. 2), L'entrée au service public : le statut des agents publics (vol. 3), rééd. Dalloz, 2004 (vol. 2 et 3) et 2005 (vol. 1)
- Théorie générale des contrats de l'administration (3 volumes), éd. Giard, 1934 (vol. 4) et LGDJ, 1936 (vol. 5 et 6)

== Citations ==
(IN FRENCH)

- Le recours pour excès de pouvoir est « l'arme la plus efficace, la plus économique et la plus pratique qui existe au monde pour défendre les libertés individuelles ».[7]
- On attribue souvent à Gaston Jèze la formule suivante : L'impôt est une prestation pécuniaire requise des particuliers par voie d'autorité, à titre définitif et sans contrepartie, en vue de la couverture des charges publiques (v. par example, Encyclopedia Universalis, 1996, v° Impôt, vol. 11, p. 1001). En réalité, cette définition est due à Georges Vedel[8].
- La véritable définition que Gaston Jèze a donnée l'impôt est la suivante : Une prestation de valeurs pécuniaires exigée des individus d'après des règles fixes, en vue de couvrir des dépenses d'intérêt général, et uniquement à raison du fait que les individus qui doivent les payer sont membres d'une communauté politique organisée [9].
- L'argent brûle les doigts de ceux qui le manipulent notion à l'origine de la séparation entre ordonnateurs et comptables publics.
- En politique, il n'y a pas de justice.[10]
- Il y a des dépenses, il faut les couvrir. (Énoncé du principe que l'État ne devrait pas dépenser plus que ses recettes, principe fondamental de finances publiques appelé aussi Loi d'équilibre ou Loi de Jèze).
- L’intérêt particulier doit s’incliner devant l’intérêt général.[11]
