= Joseph Louis Elzéar Ortolan =

French jurist

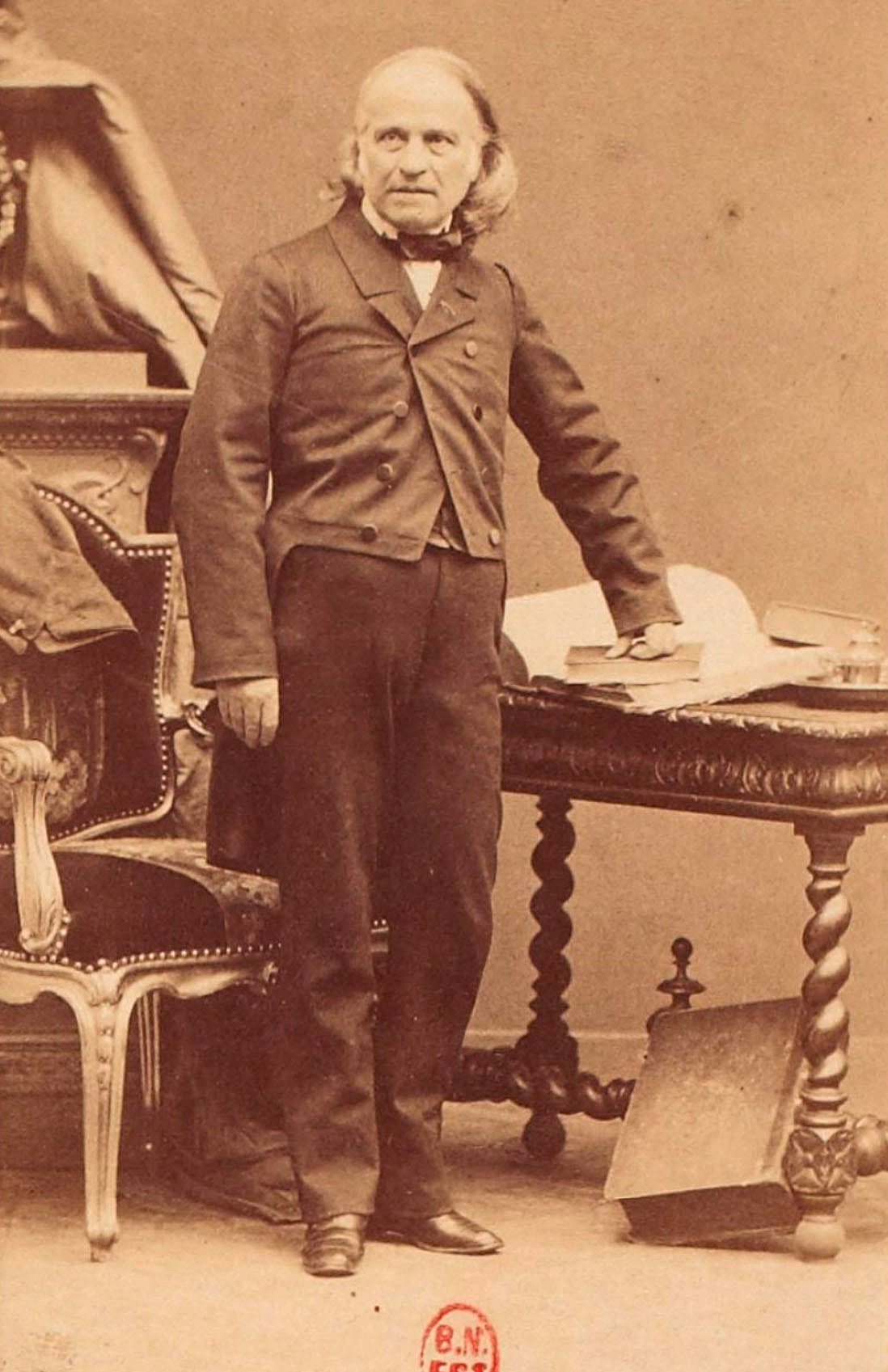
Studio portrait of Joseph Ortolan by Eugène Disdéri c.1865

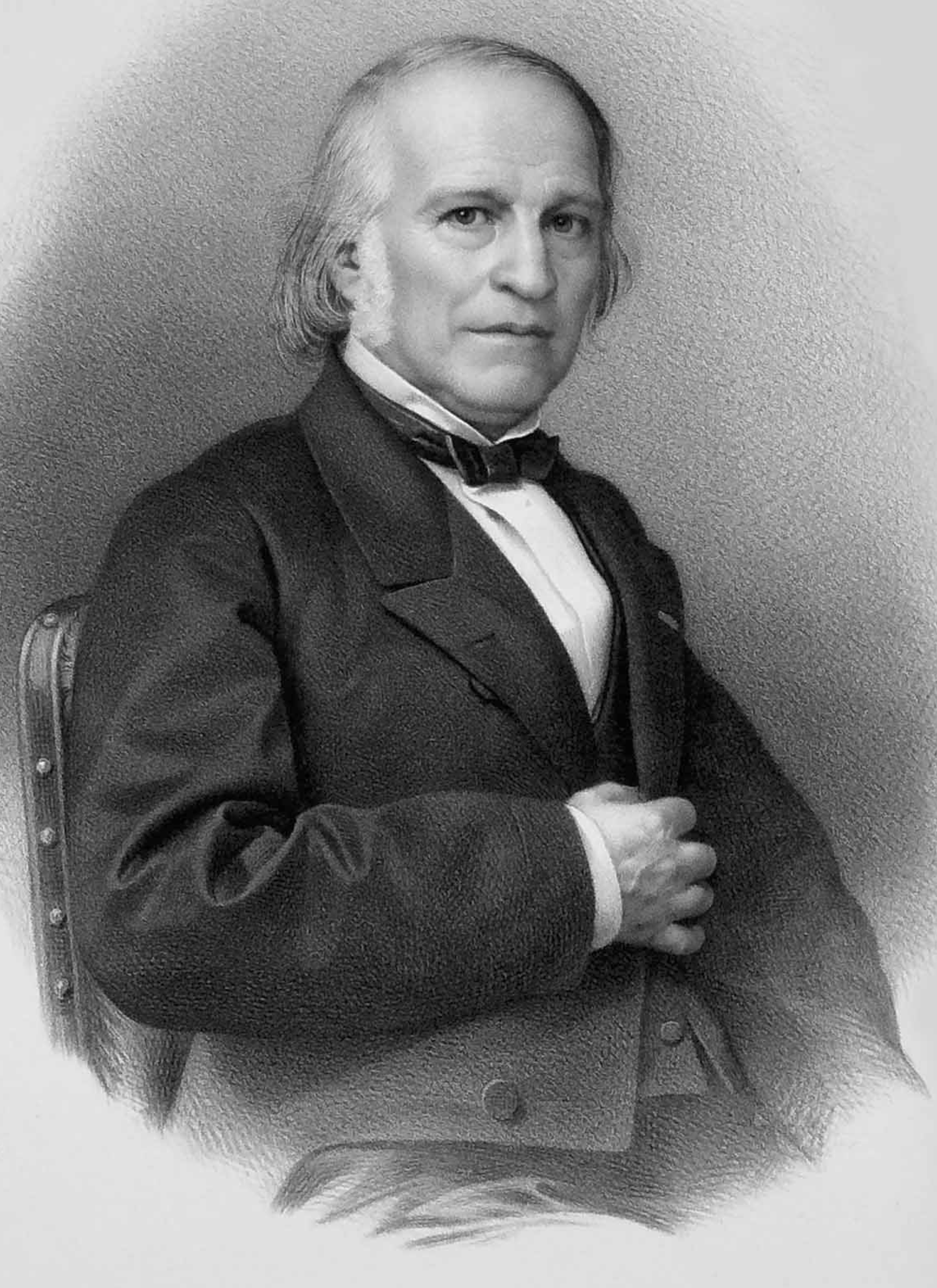
Engraving of Joseph Ortolan by Jean-Victor Frond

Joseph Louis Elzéar Ortolan (21 August 1802 – 27 March 1873) was a French jurist.

== Life ==
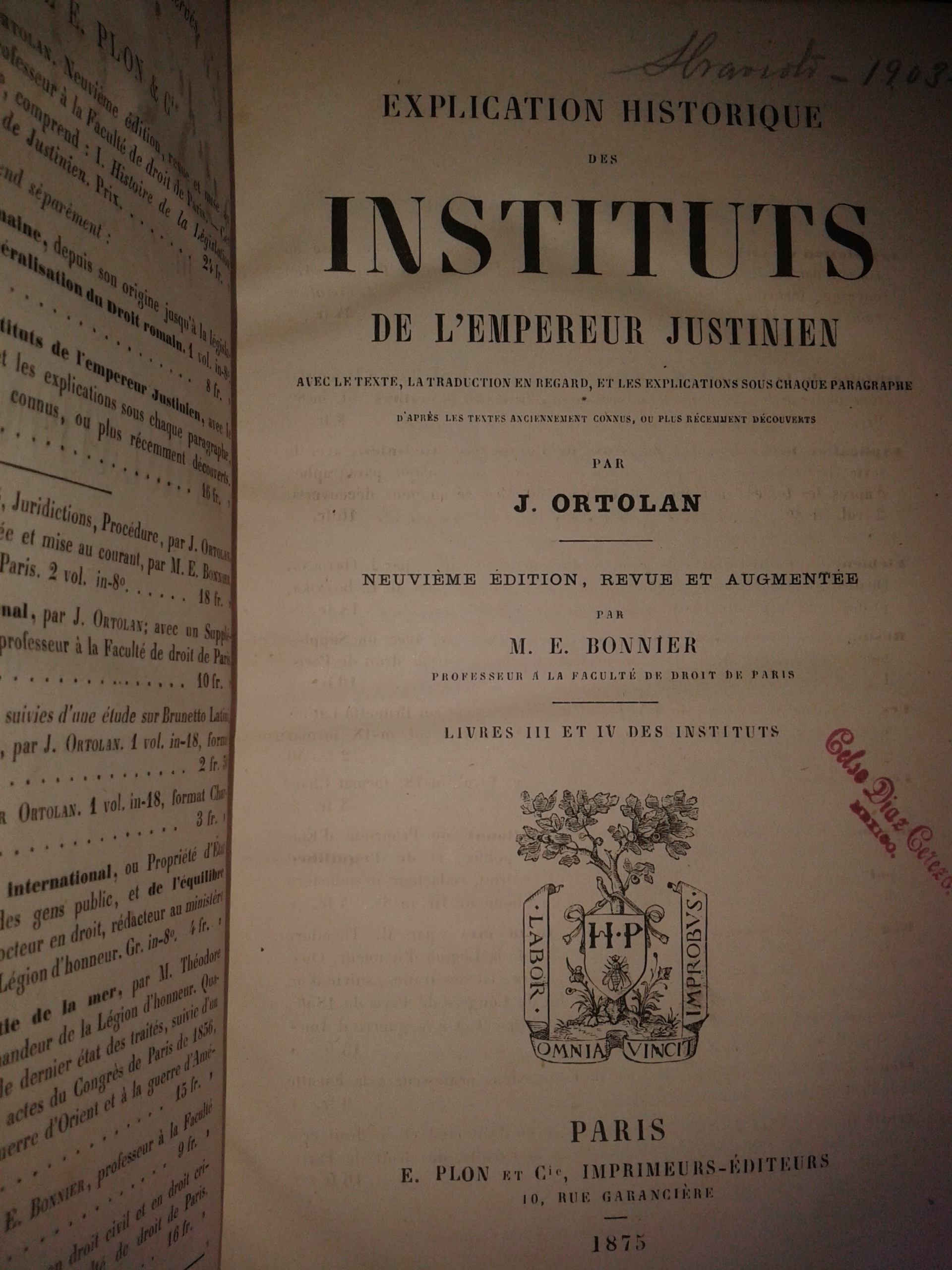
Title page of Explication historique des instituts de l'empereur Justinien, by Joseph Louis Elzéar Ortolan. Ninth edition, reviewed and enlarged by M. E. Bonnier. Books III and IV. Paris: E. Plon et Cie., 1875.

He was born at Toulon, studied law at Aix-en-Provence and Paris, and early made his name by two volumes, Explication historique des institutes de Justinien (1827), and Histoire de la legislation romaine (1828), the first of which has been frequently republished. He was made assistant librarian to the Court of Cassation, and was promoted after the Revolution of 1830 to be secretary-general.

He was also commissioned to give a course of lectures at the Sorbonne on constitutional law, and in 1836 was appointed to the chair of comparative criminal law at the Faculty of Law of Paris (University of Paris). He published many works on constitutional and comparative law, of which the following may be mentioned: Histoire du droit constitiitionnel en Europe pendant lemoyen age (1831); Introduction historique au cows de legislation penale comparee (1841); he was the author of a volume of poetry Les enfantines (1845). He died in Paris.
