= Charles Lyon-Caen =

French jurist (1843–1935)

Charles-Léon Lyon-Caen (25 December 1843 –17 December 1935) was a French jurist.

== Biography ==
Doctor of law in 1866, then agrégé in 1867, he became professor of law the same year at the Faculty of Law of Nancy, then of Paris in 1872. He also teaches at the École libre des sciences politiques and at the École des hautes études commerciales in Paris. He became "assesseur du doyen" in 1901, then dean of the Faculty of Law of Paris in 1906.

He became Chairman of the Legal Committee of the Banque de France, of the Litigation Committee of the Ministry of Finance, of the Commercial Legislation Committee at the Ministry of Commerce and Industry, and of the Technical Commission of the National Industrial Property Office.

Lyon-Caen was elected member of the Academy of Moral and Political Sciences in 1893, of which he became president in the section of legislation, public law and jurisprudence in 1905 and perpetual secretary in 1918. He is also president of the Société de législation comparée, of the Société d'études législatives, of the Institut de droit international, of the Curatorium of the Hague Academy of International Law and of the Economic and Social Sciences Section of the Comité des travaux historiques et scientifiques, as well as a member of the Royal Academy of Science, Letters and Fine Arts of Belgium, of the British Academy, and the American Society of International Law.

Married to Louise Marguerite May, he is the father of the French judge Léon Lyon-Caen.

== Works ==
- De l’action « familiae erciscundae », en droit romain. Des partages d’ascendants, en droit français (1866)
- De la condition légale des sociétés étrangères en France (1870)
- Analyse d'un projet de loi sur l'acquisition et la perte de la nationalité fédérale et de la nationalité d'État dans la confédération de l'Allemagne du Nord (1871)
- Examen doctrinal. De la jurisprudence commerciale et industrielle en 1789 et 1880 (1881)
- Étude sur le divorce en Autriche (1882)
- Étude de droit international privé maritime (1883)
- La Convention littéraire et artistique du 19 avril 1883 conclue entre la France et l'Allemagne (1884)
- Précis de droit commercial (2 vol., en collaboration avec Louis Renault, 1879–1885)
- Dictionnaire de législation comparée. Droit commercial et droit industriel. Projet de nomenclature (1887)
- De l’agrégation des Facultés de droit, 1889 (1906)
- Lois françaises et étrangères sur la propriété littéraire et artistique (3 vol., en collaboration avec Paul Delalain, 1889–1896)
- Traité de droit commercial (8 vol., en collaboration avec Louis Renault, 1889–1899, 1906–1914)
- Recueil de documents sur la prévoyance sociale (1909)
- Notice sur la vie et les travaux de Gustave Ador (1929)
- Notice sur la vie et les travaux de Cormenin (1788-1868) (1930)
