= Mathieu-Antoine Bouchaud =

French lawyer, economist and encyclopedist

- Born: 16 April 1719; Paris
- Died: 1 February 1804 (aged 84); Paris
- Occupations: Economist; Lawyer

Mathieu-Antoine Bouchaud (16 April 1719 – 1 February 1804) was an 18th-century French economist and lawyer who contributed to the Encyclopédie by Diderot and d'Alembert.

== Werke (Auswahl) ==
- 1773: Théorie des traités de commerce entre les nations. Paris.
- 1784: Recherches historiques sur la police des Romains concernant les grands chemins, les rues et les marchés, Paris, in-8°
- 1787: Commentaire sur la loi des Douze Tables, dédicated to the King, March. Tome III, p. 103-117; seconde edition in 1803 dedicated to the First Consul, in-4°

== Sources ==
- Ferdinand Hoefer, Nouvelle Biographie générale, t. 6, Paris, Firmin-Didot, 1857, p. 856.
