= Georges Vedel =

French public law professor

Member of the Constitutional Council
- In office 29 February 1980 – 28 February 1989
- Appointed by: Valéry Giscard d'Estaing
- President: Roger Frey; Daniel Mayer; Robert Badinter
- Preceded by: François Goguel
- Succeeded by: Maurice Faure

Personal details
- Born: 5 July 1910 Auch, France
- Died: 21 February 2002 (aged 91) 7th arrondissement of Paris, France
- Education: Lycée Pierre-de-Fermat
- Alma mater: University of Toulouse
- Occupation: Professor

Georges Vedel (5 July 1910 – 21 February 2002) was a French public law professor from Auch, France.

== Biography ==
Vedel is credited as being "the reviser of public law [in France]." He was a faculty member of universities in Poitiers, Toulouse, and Paris, at both Panthéon-Assas University. He was a published author, having written manuals on constitutional and regulatory law, publications which both left their mark on generations of French legal experts. Vedel was most well known for his theory of the constitutional bases present in regulatory law, a theory that united the field of public law in France.

Georges Vedel was a member of the Constitutional Council of France from 1980 to 1989. He was nominated to this position by Valéry Giscard d'Estaing, the president of France at the time. He is a fervent European and a well-known supporter of the federalist theories.

Vedel was elected to seat 5 of the Académie Française on 28 May 1998, replacing René Huyghe.

== Published works ==
- An Essay on the Cause Notion of Regulatory Law. (1934)
- Constitutional Law. (1949)
- Regulatory Law. (1958)

== Reports ==
- Long-term Perspectives of French Agriculture. (published by La Documentation française, 1969.)
- Growth of Competency in the European Parliament. (published by Journal des Communautés européennes, 1972.)
- Financing Public Business. (published by J.O.C.E.S., 1976.)
- Management of Press Businesses. (published by J.O.C.E.S., 1979.)
- Presidency of the Consultative Committee for the revision of the Constitution. (published by La Documentation française, 1993.)

Legal offices
| Preceded by François Goguel | Member of the Constitutional Council; 1980–1989 | Succeeded by Maurice Faure |
