= Lemercier =

Lemercier (English equivalent Taylor) is a common French occupational surname. Notable people with the surname include:

- Népomucène Lemercier (1771–1840), French poet and dramatist
- Pierre Lemercier, (fl 1532–1552), French architect/master mason
- Nicolas Lemercier, (1541–1637), French architect/master mason
- Jacques Lemercier (c.1585–1654), French architect and engineer
- Valérie Lemercier, French actress, director and singer
- Louis Lemercier de Neuville, French dramatic author and puppeteer
- Charles Lemercier de Longpré, baron d'Haussez, Minister of the Marine

== See also ==
- Lemercier, Guadeloupe, a settlement in the commune of Le Moule
