= Jean Marot (architect) =

French architect and engraver

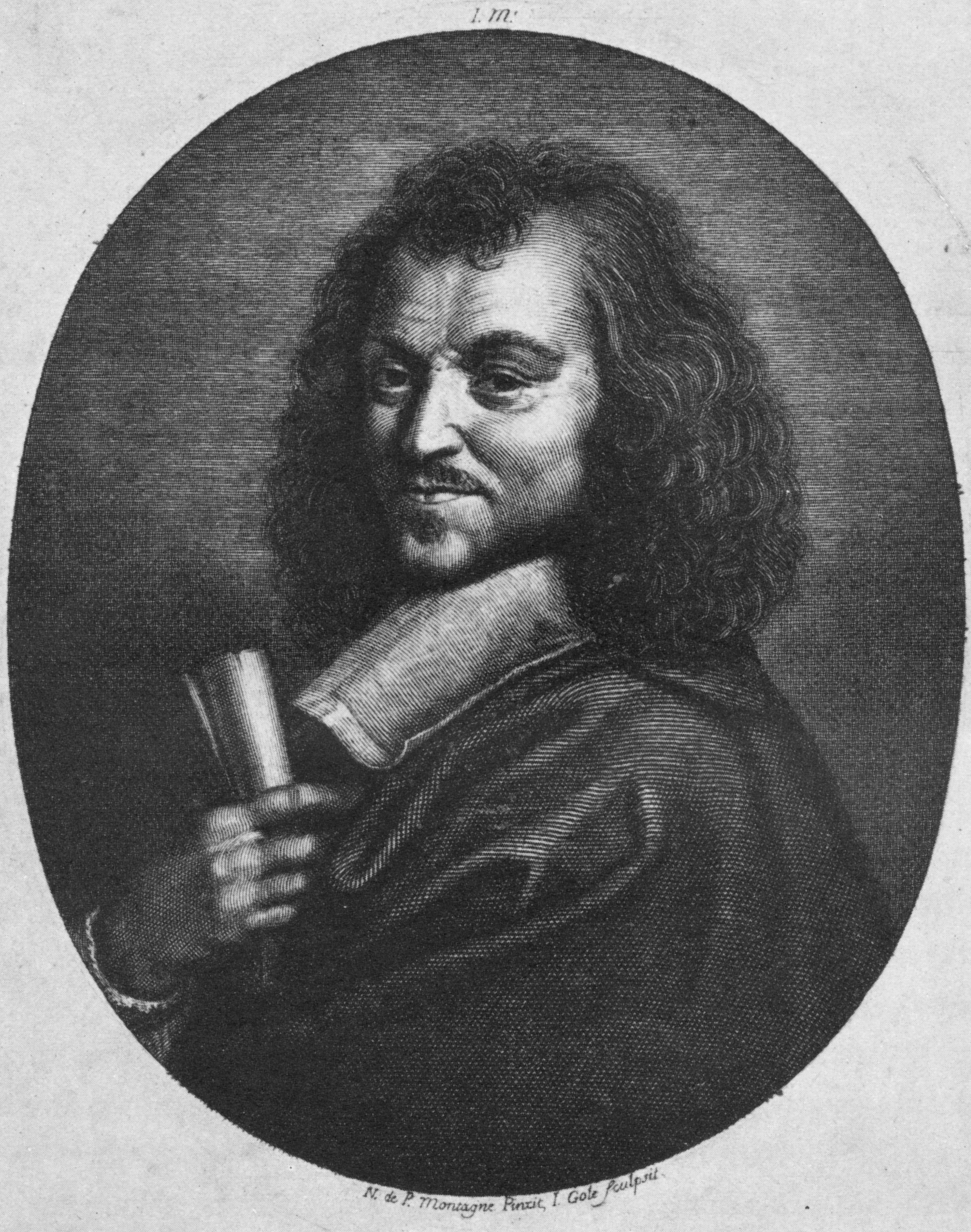
Jean Marot

Jean Marot (English: /mɑːˈroʊ/ mah-ROH, French: [ʒɑ̃ maʁo]; 1619 – 15 December 1679) was a French architect and engraver of architectural views. Little has survived of his own architectural work, but his engravings of the works of others, primarily those published in the volumes referred to as the Petit Marot (c. 1659) and the Grand Marot (1686), were highly esteemed by his contemporaries and remain, despite numerous inaccuracies and distortions, among the most important sources concerning architecture in France up to the early part of the reign of Louis XIV.

== Early life and career ==
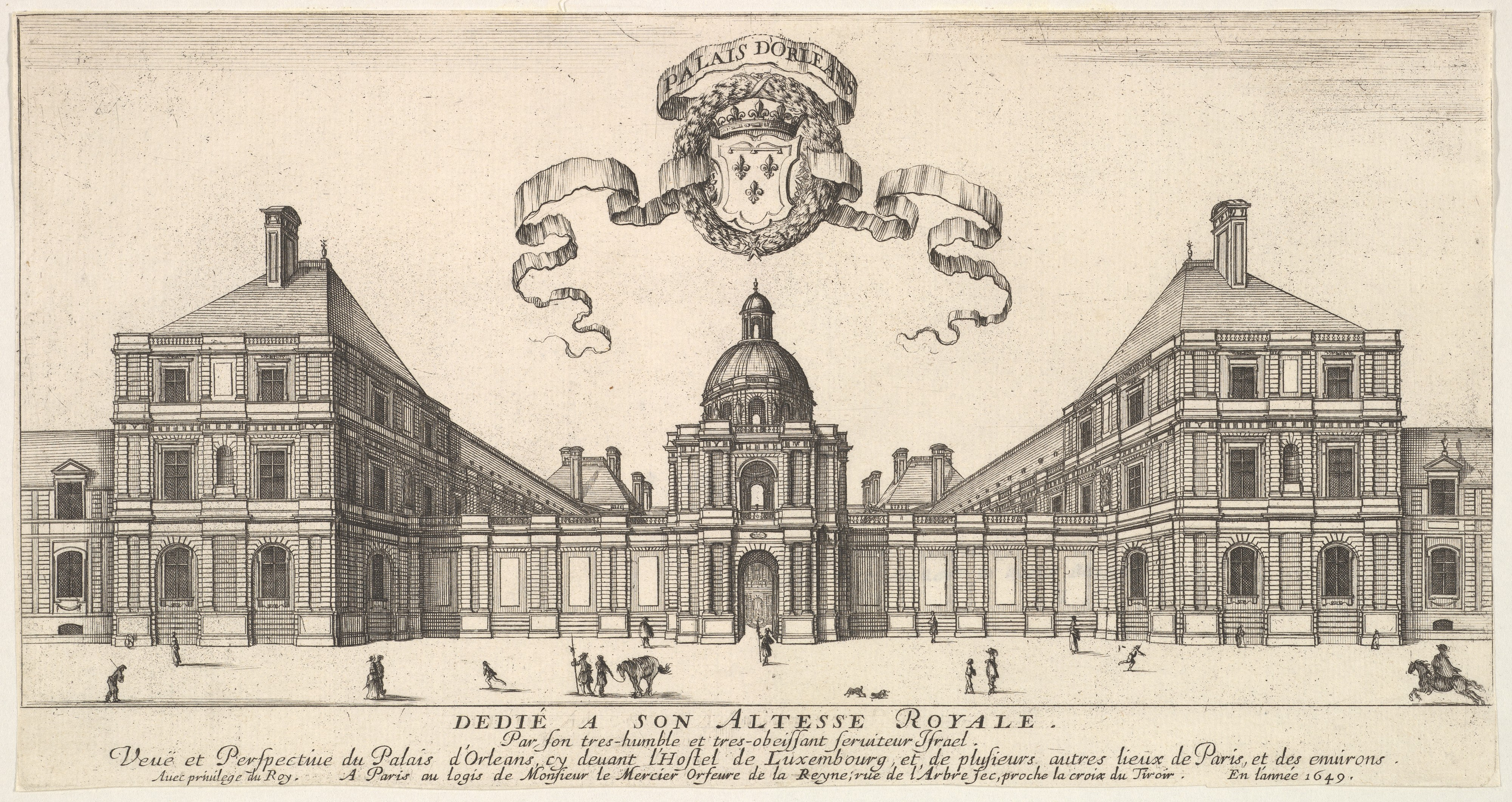
Perspective view of the street facade of Salomon de Brosse's Palais du Luxembourg in 1649, as engraved by Marot in collaboration with Israël Silvestre and Stefano della Bella

Born in Paris, he was the son of Girard Marot, a cabinetmaker of Netherlandish origin. Early in his career Jean Marot worked for the print publisher Israël Henriet, for whom he engraved architectural views in collaboration with Israël Silvestre, who may have provided sketches and engraved landscapes, and Stefano della Bella, who engraved figures and other embellishments. Among the architects whose designs Marot engraved (and interpreted) are Gianlorenzo Bernini, Salomon de Brosse, Jacques Lemercier, François Mansart, Louis Le Vau, Claude Perrault, and Jules Hardouin-Mansart. Marot also engraved plates after Vignola, Scamozzi, Palladio, and Philibert de L'Orme. Among the more notable buildings represented are the former Château de Richelieu, the Hôtel royal des Invalides, the Louvre in 1676, and the former Château de Madrid in 1678.

== Family ==
His brother Jean-Baptiste Marot (born 1632) was a painter. In 1659 Jean Marot married Charlotte Garbran, whose sister Anne was married to Pierre Gole, a cabinetmaker to Louis XIV. This relationship was to prove advantageous for Marot's further career. The marriage documents include an inventory of his belongings with important information on the engraved copper plates in his possession at that time. His son Daniel Marot was an engraver, who worked with his father in Paris, until he was motivated by anti-Protestant laws to emigrate to the Netherlands, where he became the primary designer for William of Orange. Another son, Jean Marot II, likely worked as an engraver with his father, and later, after becoming a Catholic, as an architect in the Bâtiments du Roi (1686 to 1702).

Jean Marot died in Paris.

== Publications ==
If the likely publication date of the first edition is known, that is the one given. Many of the online copies linked here are later editions, which can vary in content. The list is not complete.

- Diverses inventions nouvelles, pour des cheminées avec leurs ornemans de l'invention de Jean Marot (c. 1648)
  - Gallica: 4-HZ-256
- Le Magnifique château de Richelieu... (Paris, [c. 1657])
  - Gallica: 4-HA-6 (A)
  - ETH (Library of the Eidgenössische Technische Hochschule Zurich, at e-rara): doi:10.3931/e-rara-9235
  - INHA (Bibliothèque de l'Institut National d'Histoire de l'Art): NUM 4 RES 826
- Petit Marot – Recueil des plans, profils, et élévations de plusieurs palais, chasteaux, églises, sépultures, grotes et hostels bâtis dans Paris (Paris, [c. 1659])
  - Gallica: RES M-V-176; 4-HA-7 (A); 4-HA-7 (B)
  - GRI (Library of the Getty Research Institute, at the Internet Archive): 122903; 1764 reprint: 4663
  - ETH: doi:10.3931/e-rara-5383
  - INHA: NUM 4 RES 9
- Receuil des plus beaux portails de plusieures eglises de Paris (designs by Pierre Cottart, 1660)
  - GRI: 247436
- Description générale de l’hôtel des Invalides... (1683) [of the 20 plates (not counting the frontispiece), 14 are by Marot, probably engraved in 1677; 2 additional plates were added in a later edition]
  - INHA: NUM FOL EST 144
- Grand Marot – [L’Architecture françoise] (Paris, [1686]) [later editions usually include more plates, some engraved by his son, Daniel Marot]; republished as volume 4 of Jean Mariette's L’Architecture française (5 volumes, Paris, 1727)
  - Gallica: RES-V-371 (rare example of the first edition)
  - Heidelberg University Library: 116946342

== Gallery ==
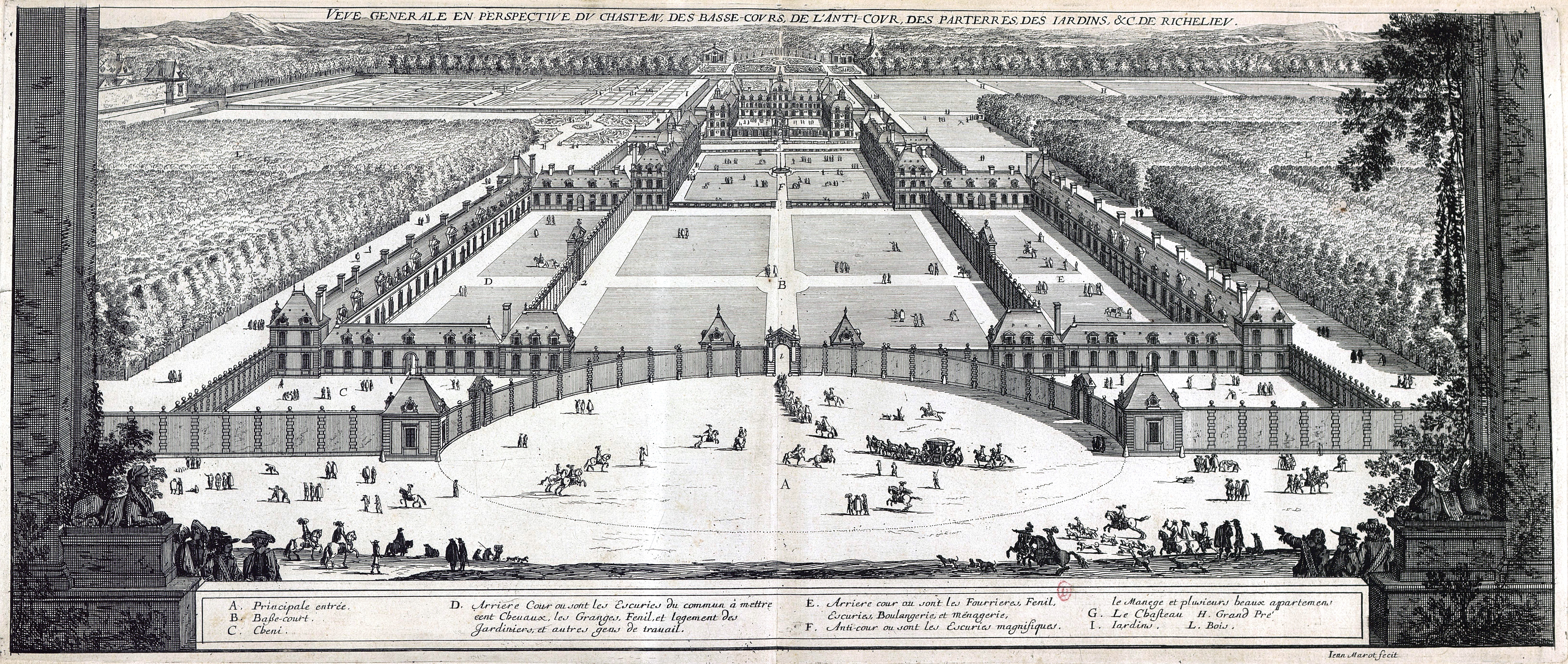
General perspective view of Jacques Lemercier's Château de Richelieu, engraved by Marot c. 1657, with embellishments by Jean Lepautre

== Bibliography ==
- Deutsch, Kristina (2011). "'Marot. Il se nommait Jean… '. Essai sur l’œuvre d’un graveur d’architecture du Grand Siècle", Nouvelles de l'estampe, no. 236 (Autumn 2011), pp. 4–23. ISSN 0029-4888.
- Deutsch, Kristina (2015). Jean Marot : Un graveur d'architecture à l'époque de Louis XIV. Berlin: De Gruyter. ISBN 9783110375954.
- Faucheux, Louis-Étienne (1857). Catalogue raisonné de toutes les estampes qui forment l'oeuvre d'Israel Silvestre. Paris: Vve Jules Renouard. Copy at Gallica.
- Jal, Auguste (1867). Dictionnaire critique de biographie et d'histoire. Paris: Henri Plon. Copy at Gallica.
- Mauban, André (1944). Jean Marot: Architecte et Graveur Parisien. Paris: Les Éditions d'Art et d'Histoire. OCLC 7057275. Catalog record at HathiTrust.
- Turpin, Adriana (1996). "Marot: (1) Jean Marot I", vol. 20, pp. 456–458, in The Dictionary of Art, edited by Jane Turner, reprinted with minor corrections in 1998. New York: Grove. ISBN 9781884446009. Also at Oxford Art Online (subscription, Wikipedia Library access or UK public library membership required).
