= Siege of Alès =

Siege and capture of Huguenot city of Ales by Louis XIII army

Coordinates: 44.12°N 4.08°E

Siege of Alès (1629)
- Part of the Huguenot rebellions
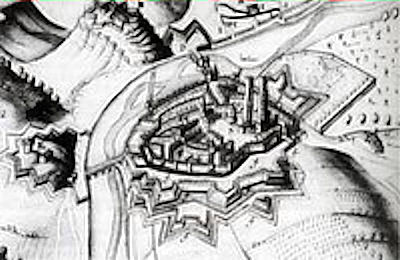
- Siege of Alès in June 1629.
Date	9–17 June 1629
Location	Alès
Result	Royal victory

Belligerents
France	Huguenot

Commanders and leaders
Louis XIII	Henri de Rohan

Strength
23,000	2,300

The siege of Alès was undertaken by Louis XIII of France, and the city captured on 17 June 1629.

== Siege ==
The siege of Alès followed the disastrous capitulation of the main Protestant stronghold of La Rochelle, in the siege of La Rochelle. Huguenot resistance persisted in the south of France though, and Louis XIII endeavoured to eliminate it as well. With Privas and Anduze, the city of Alès was at the center of a string of Protestants strongholds in the Languedoc, stretching from Nîmes and Uzès in the east, to Castres and Montauban in the west. Alès was selected by Antoine Hercule de Budos, Marquis des Portes (1589-1629), as a strategic target to sever Huguenot defenses in two and disconnect their main centers of Nîmes and Montauban.

After Privas fell on 28 May 1629, in which the Marquis des Portes was killed, French attention turned to Alès. After an intense siege, the city surrendered on 17 June. At the end of the siege, Henri, Duke of Rohan, the leader of the Huguenot rebellion, submitted.

== Aftermath ==
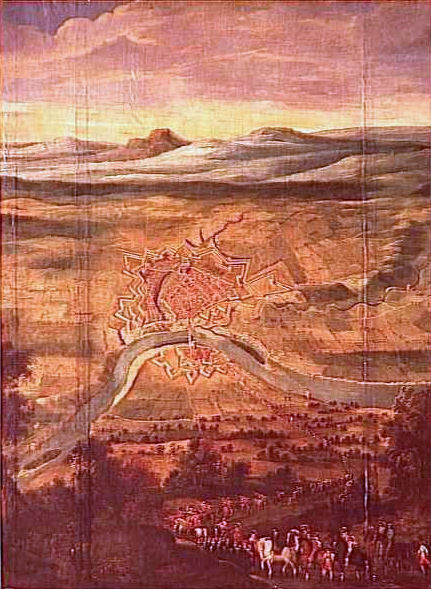
Redition of Montauban, 21 August 1629. Château de Richelieu.

The remaining Huguenot cities rapidly fell, and finally Montauban surrendered without resistance. This was one of the last events in the repression of the Huguenot rebellions in France.

The siege was followed by the Peace of Alès (27 September 1629), which settled the revolt by guaranteeing the practice of the Huguenot religion and judicial protection, but requiring Huguenot strongholds as well as political assemblies to be dismantled.

== See also ==
- French Wars of Religion
- Huguenot rebellions
