= Nicolas Prévost =

French painter

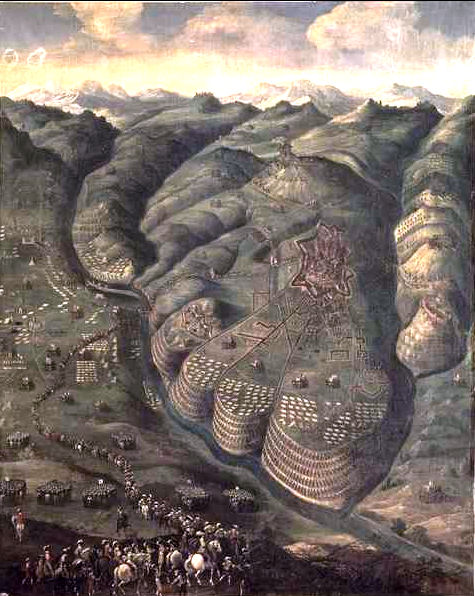
Siege of Privas, by Nicolas Prévost, 1640. Château de Richelieu.

Nicolas Prévost (1604–1670) was a French painter at the court of Louis XIII and Richelieu. In 1640, Richelieu commissioned him to paint the Siege of Privas, based on the engraving by Abraham Bosse, as well as several more of his personal achievements. The painting is now located at the Château de Richelieu. He was a pupil of Simon Vouet.

- Media related to Nicolas Prévost at Wikimedia Commons
