= Surrender of Montauban =

1629 surrender of Montauban to Louis XIII

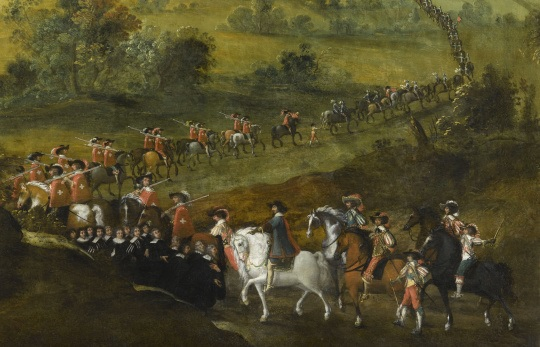
Louis XIII arriving for the surrender of Montauban, 21 August 1629 (detail).

The Surrender of Montauban occurred on 21 August 1629, when the Huguenot city of Montauban surrendered to the Catholic troops of the French king Louis XIII under the direction of Richelieu.

In 1621, Mautauban had successfully resisted the assaults of Louis XIII, but the city finally lost its independence with its surrender to royal forces in 1629. Montauban was considered to be the most powerful Huguenot fortress in France after La Rochelle.

The redition was the final chapter of the Huguenot rebellions, as the remnants of Huguenot power in southern France surrendered to the king. After the sieges of Privas and Alès, the remaining Huguenot cities rapidly fell, and finally Montauban surrendered without resistance. This was one of the last events in the repression of the Huguenot rebellions in France.

The redition was followed by the Peace of Alès of 27 September 1629, which settled the revolt by guaranteeing the practice of the Huguenot religion and judicial protection, but requiring Huguenot strongholds as well as political assemblies to be dismantled.

Soon after the surrender, the fortifications of Montauban were taken down by Richelieu. Catholicism was reinstated in Montauban, and a governing body, formed of half Protestants and half Catholics, established, as well as a senior administrator representing the king in 1635. In the space of 30 years, numerous discriminatory rules were established against the Protestants of Montauban, from clothing to religious restrictions. The Huguenots of Montauban were finally broken by Catholic military repression, the dragonnades, in 1683.
