= Charles David (architect) =

French architect

Charles David (1552 – 4 December 1650) was a 16th/17th-century French architect. He married Anne Lemercier, daughter of architect Nicolas Lemercier in 1582 and succeeded his father-in-law as architect of the church of Saint-Eustache, Paris in 1585. David was responsible for the construction of the choir, which was completed in 1637.

According to Paluster he was interred at St.-Eustache, with the epitaph (since effaced):

Ici gist le corps d'honorable homme Charles David vivant juré du Roy es oeuvres de maçonnerie doyen des jurés et bourgeois de Paris architecte et conducteur du batiment de l'eglize de ceans lequel apres avoir vecu vec Anne Lemercier sa femme l'espace de cincquante ans est decédé le 4 jour de December 1650 agé quatrevingt dix-huit ans

He was succeeded at Saint-Eustache by Jean Mansart de Jouy.
