= Siege of Privas =

1629 siege

Coordinates: 44.7347°N 4.5988°E

Siege of Privas (1629)
- Part of the Huguenot rebellions
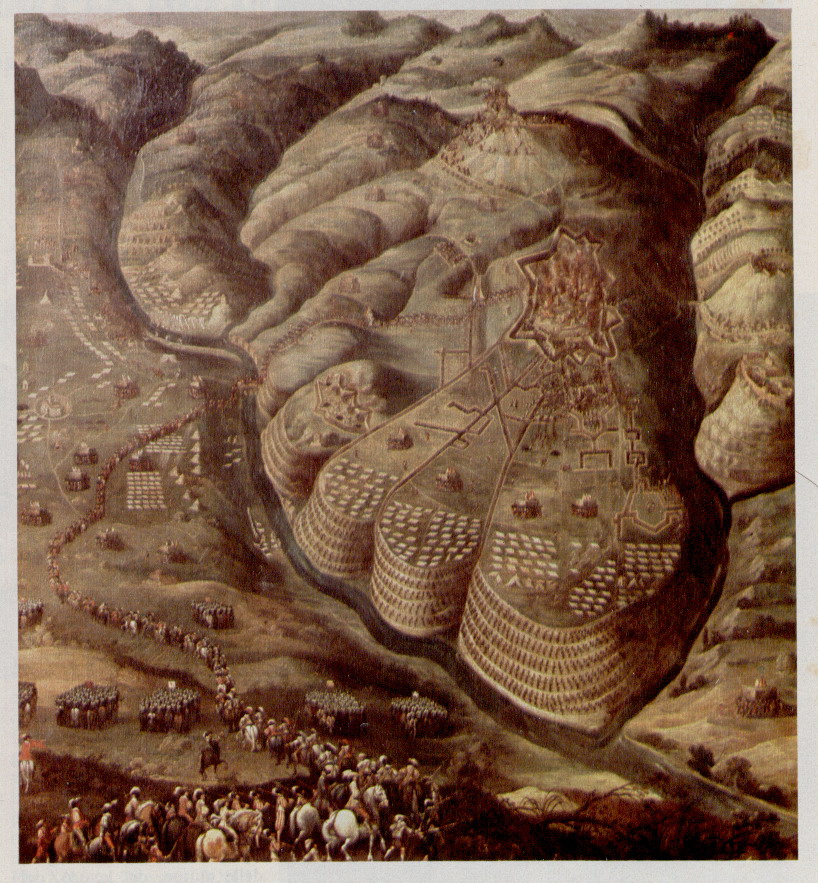
- Siege of the city of Privas in 1629, by Abraham Bosse (1604–76)
| Date | 14–28 May 1629 |
| Location | Privas |
| Result | Royal victory |

Belligerents
| France | Huguenot |

Commanders and leaders
| (Kingdom of France) Louis XIII (Kingdom of France) Henri de Schomberg | Henri de Rohan |

Strength
| 20,000 | 3,000 |

Casualties and losses
| Unknown | 200 executed or enslaved |

The siege of Privas was undertaken by Louis XIII of France from 14 May 1629, and the city of Privas was captured on 28 May 1629. It was one of the last events of the Huguenot rebellions (1621-1629).

== Context ==
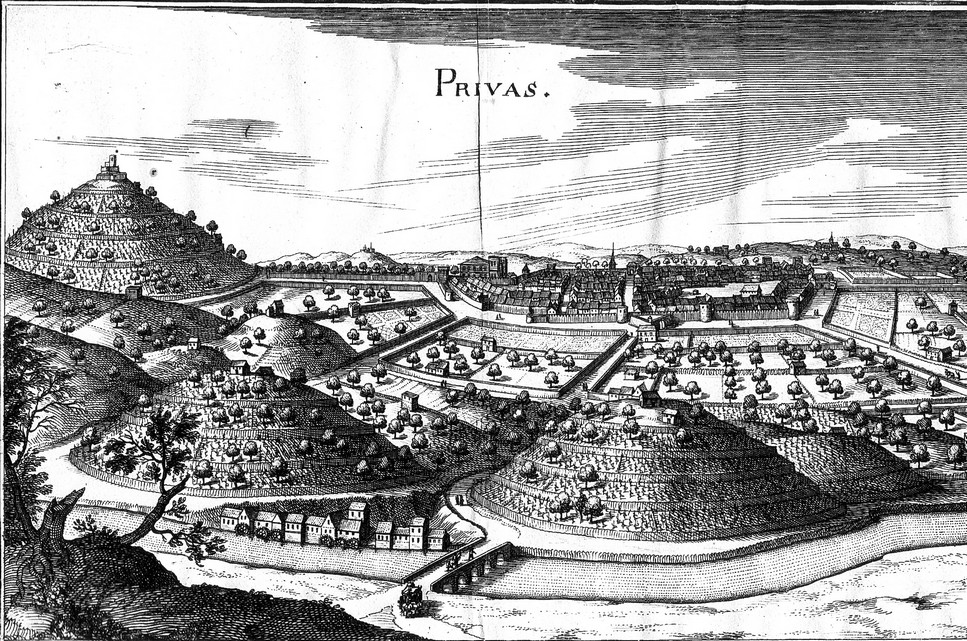
Privas circa 1620, by Matthaeus Merian.

The siege of Privas followed the disastrous capitulation of the main Protestant stronghold of La Rochelle. Louis XIII then moved to eliminate the remaining Huguenot resistance in the south of France. With Alès and Anduze, the city of Privas was at the center of a string of Protestant strongholds in the Languedoc, stretching from Nîmes and Uzès in the east, to Castres and Montauban in the west. Privas was selected by Antoine Hercule de Budos, Marquis des Portes (1589-1629), as a strategic target; capturing it would break a line of Huguenot defences and disconnect their main centers of Nîmes and Montauban. The city was defended by Alexandre du Puy-Montbrun, a leading Protestant from Montbrun-les-Bains in the Dauphiné, already active in Montauban (1621).

== The siege ==
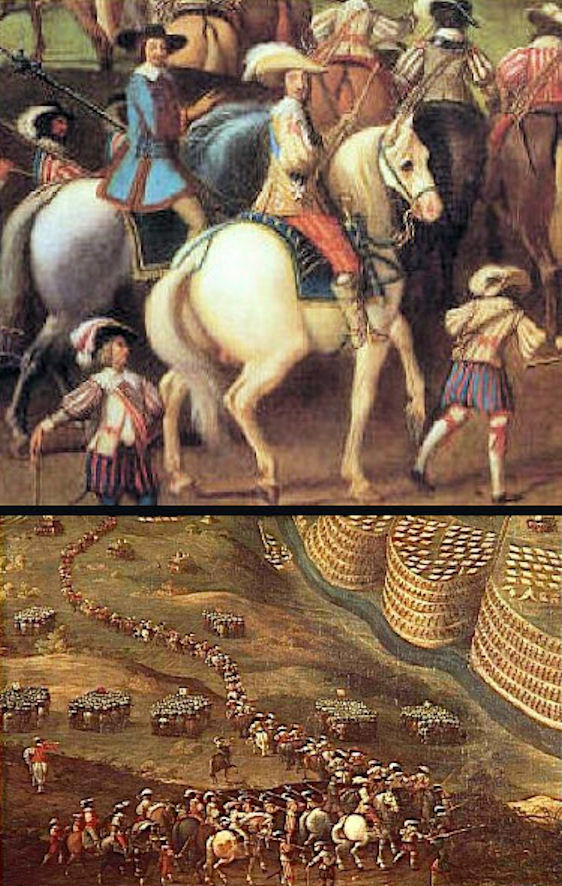
Louis XIII at the Siege of Privas. Siège de Privas, by Nicolas Prévost, 1640 (detail). Château de Richelieu

Privas was captured on 28 May 1629 after a siege of 15 days, at which Louis XIII was present. 500 to 600 Huguenot men who had barricaded themselves in a fort surrendered, but some attempted to blow themselves up with Royal troops, leading to a massacre. The city was destroyed by looting and burning.

In a letter to the Queen, Richelieu reported the destruction in wording that minimized active responsibility on the part of royal Catholic forces:

There was no intention of giving up the place to pillage, but in the night it was abandoned, and the gates thrown open for the soldiers to enter in crowds to plunder. Everything possible was done to prevent it being burned, but not a house had escaped the flames. Orders were given to prevent those in the fort from being molested by the troops, but they violently exposed themselves to destruction, leaping down from their fortifications, and incensing the soldiers against them, by their desperate attempts to destroy themselves with the King's followers.

— Letter from Richelieu to the Queen, Privas, 30 May 1629.

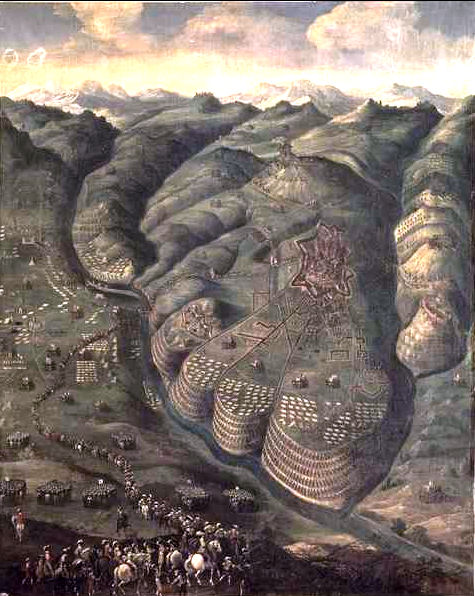
Siège de Privas, by Nicolas Prévost, 1640. Château de Richelieu

One girl who escaped the massacre was adopted by Richelieu, and was nicknamed "La Fortunée de Privas". The Marquis des Portes was killed in the siege.

== Aftermath ==
After Privas, Alès soon fell in the Siege of Alès in June 1629. The remaining Huguenot cities rapidly fell too, and finally Montauban surrendered after a short siege led by Bassompierre.

These last sieges of the Huguenot rebellion were followed by the Peace of Alès (27 September 1629), which settled the revolt by guaranteeing the practice of the Huguenot religion and judicial protection, but requiring Huguenot strongholds as well as political assemblies to be dismantled.

In 1640, Richelieu commissioned painter Nicolas Prévost to paint the siege, based on the engraving by Abraham Bosse. The painting is now located at the Château de Richelieu.

== See also ==
- French Wars of Religion
- Huguenot rebellions
