= Israël Henriet =

French draughtsman and copper engraver

- Turkish man, from the print series Plusieurs têtes coiffées à la persienne, 1650, Metropolitan Museum of Art, New York
- Born: 1590; Nancy, Kingdom of France
- Died: 25 April 1661 (aged 70–71); Paris, Kingdom of France
- Occupations: Draftsman; Engraver
- Movement: Baroque
- Patrons: Louis XIII

Signature
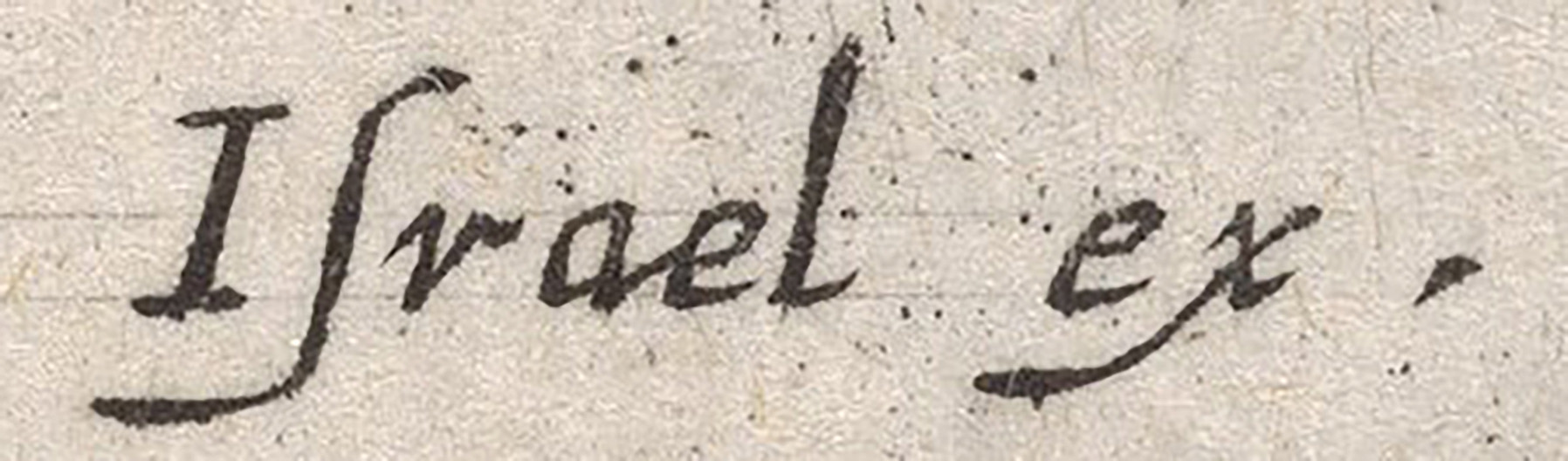

Israël Henriet (1590 – 25 April 1661) was a French draftsman, engraver and print dealer.

== Biography ==
Born in Nancy in 1590, Israël Henriet was a childhood friend of the engraver Jacques Callot. His father, Claude Henriet, served as court painter to Duke Charles III of Lorraine. Henriet studied engraving in Florence under Antonio Tempesta alongside Jacques Callot and Claude Deruet.

During the early 17th century, drawing became highly fashionable among the French aristocracy. Capitalizing on this trend, Henriet established himself in Paris as a drawing master to the wealthy and members of the royal court, eventually becoming the teacher of drawing to King Louis XIII – a prestigious role that cemented his reputation.

Once Henriet had settled in Paris (1622), his chief activity became the publication of prints. Following Callot's death, he acquired the exclusive rights to publish his etchings. He also published the work of other artists, including Stefano della Bella, Jean Le Clerc, and Charles Audran. Henriet also commissioned work from François Collignon (who in 1640 was godfather to one of his daughters), Jean Marot and Gabriel Pérelle.

Henriet was the uncle of the engraver Israel Silvestre. Following the death of his parents, Silvestre lived and worked in his uncle’s Parisian home, where he refined his drafting skills. At his death Silvestre, inherited his uncle’s stock of plates.

== Gallery of images ==
A slave holds a camel by the bridle, from the print series Plusieurs têtes coiffées à la persienne, 1650, Metropolitan Museum of Art, New York

Bust of a Soldier in Profile, from the print collection Diverses tétes et figures, 1650, Metropolitan Museum of Art, New York

Frontispiece, from the print series Les petits apôtres, c. 1632, Metropolitan Museum of Art, New York

Martyrdom of Saint Paul, from the print series Les petits apôtres, c. 1632, Metropolitan Museum of Art, New York

Marine View, from the print series Diverse vedute designate in Fiorenza, c. 1618–35, Metropolitan Museum of Art, New York

Soldiers waiting to board a ship, from the print series, Various Embarkations, c. 1646–47, Metropolitan Museum of Art, New York

Two children sitting on the ground, from the print series Livre pour apprendre à dessiner, c. 1649, Metropolitan Museum of Art, New York

== Bibliography ==
- Meaume, Édouard (1853). "Recherches Sur La Vie et Les Ouvrages De Jacques Callot. Première partie: Biographie". Mémoires de l'Académie de Stanislas: 191–327.
- Préaud, Maxime (2003). "Henriet, Israël". Grove Art Online. Oxford: Oxford University Press. doi:10.1093/gao/9781884446054.article.T037557.
