= Antonio Tempesta =

Italian painter and engraver (1555–1630)

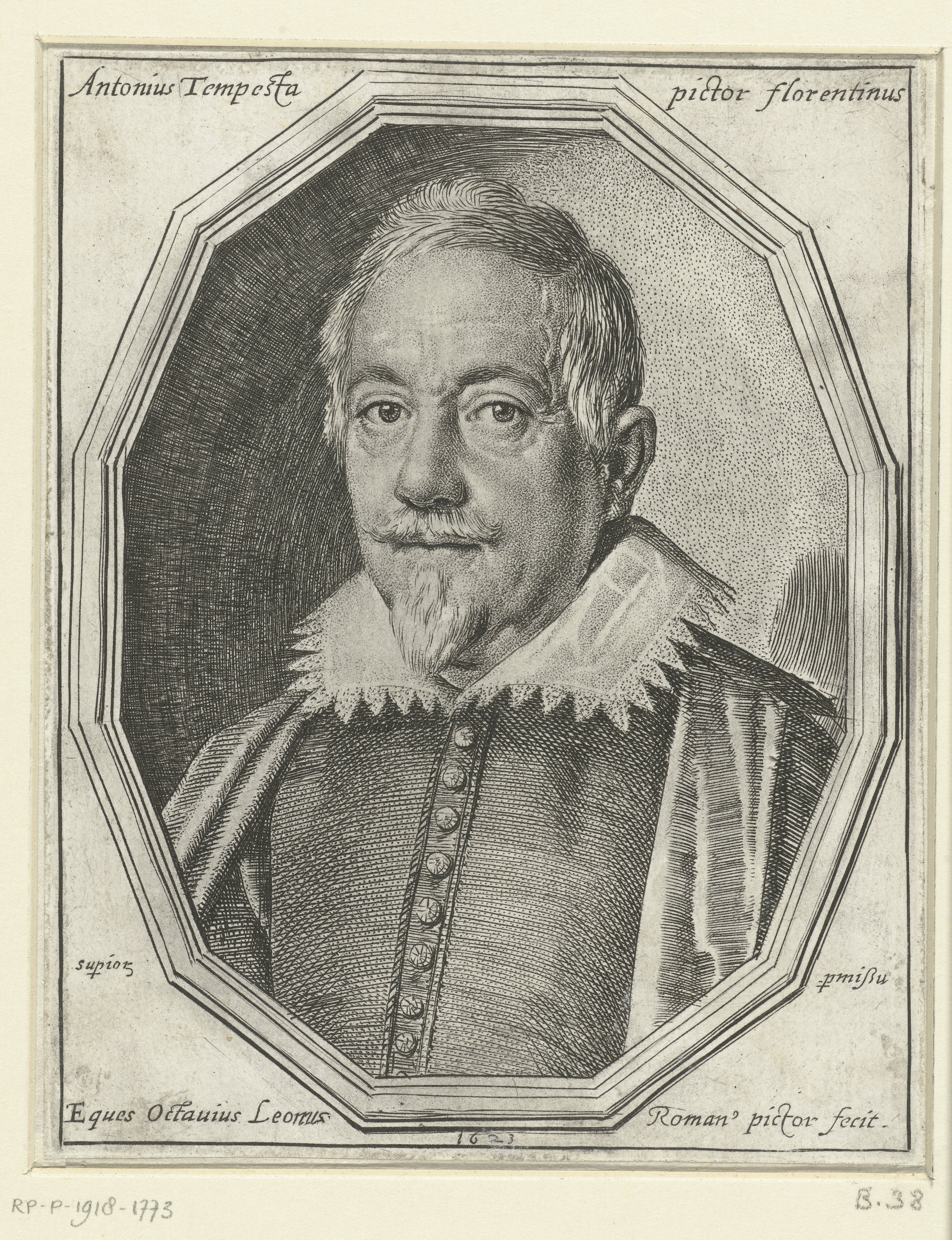
- Portrait of Antonio Tempesta engraved by Ottavio Leoni, 1623
- Born: 1555; Florence, Grand Duchy of Tuscany
- Died: 5 August 1630 (aged 74–75); Rome, Papal States
- Other name: Il Tempestino
- Education: Santi di Tito; Stradanus
- Occupations: Painter; Engraver
- Known for: Battle painting
- Movement: Baroque

Antonio Tempesta, also called il Tempestino (1555 – 5 August 1630), was an Italian painter and engraver, whose art acted as a point of connection between Baroque Rome and the culture of Antwerp. Much of his work depicts major battles and historical figures.

== Life ==
He was born and trained in Florence and painted in a variety of styles, influenced to some degree by "Counter-Maniera" or Counter-Mannerism. He enrolled in the Florentine Accademia delle Arti del Disegno in 1576. He was a pupil of Santi di Tito, then of the Flemish painter Joannes Stradanus. He was part of the large team of artists working under Giorgio Vasari on the interior decoration of the Palazzo Vecchio in Florence.

In 1573, Tempesta moved to Rome, where he completed commissions for numerous noble families and prominent cardinals, including Alessandro Farnese and Scipione Borghese. While in Rome, he associated with artists from the Habsburg Netherlands who had a profound influence on his style of landscape painting. From the early 1600s onwards, Tempesta devoted himself increasingly to engraving, a medium through which he achieved widespread fame and recognition throughout Europe. Tempesta became a member of the Accademia dei Virtuosi al Pantheon in Rome in 1611 and of the Accademia di San Luca in Rome by 1623, though probably earlier. Tempesta died in Rome on 5 August 1630. His pupils included Jacques Callot, Claude Deruet and Israël Henriet.

The works of Tempesta were an important source of inspiration for 17th- and 18th-century artists. Many engravings by Matthäus Merian and Stefano della Bella are based on Tempesta's compositions. In his lecture, Italienische Antike im Zeitalter Rembrandts (Italian Antiquity in the Age of Rembrandt), delivered in Hamburg on 29 May 1926, Aby Warburg highlighted Tempesta's influence on Rembrandt's work, particularly in The Conspiracy of Claudius Civilis (now in the Nationalmuseum, Stockholm), which relies heavily on a composition from Tempesta's series of prints, Batavorum cum Romanis Bellum. Giorgio de Chirico was a great admirer of Tempesta’s etchings, particularly his battle scenes, and used them as models for several of his own paintings.

== Commissions ==
=== Painting ===
Tempesta and the Flemish painter Matthijs Bril were commissioned by Pope Gregory XIII to paint wide panoramas of the Procession to Transfer the Relics of St. Gregory of Nazianzus (1572) for the loggias on the third floor of the Vatican Palace. He completed frescoes in the Palazzina Gambara at the Villa Lante in Bagnaia (1578-1609). From 1579 to 1583, Tempesta participated in the decoration of the Villa Farnese in Caprarola. Working alongside his workshop, he painted elaborate frescoes, idealised landscapes, grotesques and allegories on the walls and vault of the monumental helical staircase of th villa, designed by Giacomo Barozzi da Vignola.

Tempesta painted frescoes for the Palazzos Colonna, the Doria Pamphilj, and for the Marchese Giustiniani in his Roman palace, where Tempesta collaborated with Paul Bril, and at Bassano di Sutri. At Santo Stefano al Monte Celio in Rome in 1583–5 Tempesta, again working for Pope Gregory XIII, executed a series of frescoes on the entrance wall and interior of the chapel of Saints Primus and Felicianus. Subjects include the Massacre of the Innocents, and the Seven Sorrows of the Virgin, in which the Virgin is surrounded by seven swords, each with a tondo at the tip. This motif, rare in Italy, was derived from the south Netherlandish artist Bernard van Orley. In the frescoes in the interior of the chapel, which depict the martyrdom of the two saints, the architectural settings are impressive, and Tempesta’s interest in depicting nature, particularly animals, is evident.

=== Engraving ===
The Crucifixion, 1612, National Gallery of Art, Washington, D.C.

Tempesta is now best known as a printmaker in etching and engraving. Between 1589 and 1627 he made over 1000 prints, which were copied, adapted, and collected across Europe. Apart from single sheets, these were mainly series of engravings and book illustrations of which the following are particularly outstanding: 220 engravings for the Old Testament; 12 engravings illustrating the deeds of Alexander the Great (1608); 150 illustrations for Ovid’s Metamorphoses (1606); and three series c. 1620 and 1627 illustrating Torquato Tasso’s Jerusalem Delivered.

In 1612 he engraved a series of plates under the title Batavorum cum Romanis Bellum after designs of the Netherlandish artist Otto van Veen, also known as Vaenius (1556-1629) and court painter to Alessandro Farnese. Van Veen was influenced by the Italian mannerists but had developed his own style anticipating the Flemish baroque of his pupil Peter Paul Rubens. The series consists of 36 numbered engraved plates and illustrates the armed struggle between the ancient Dutch tribes and their Roman oppressors as narrated in Tacitus' Histories. Each plate bears at the bottom an engraved legend in Flemish and in Latin while a detailed explanation is printed on the otherwise blank verso. Plate I, signed 'Ant.Tempesta f. Anno 1611', shows 'Roma' and 'Batavia' in battle dress with respective scenic backgrounds, symbolizing the two nations. Fifteen other plates bear Tempesta's monogram. The plates depict heroic events, sieges, and battle scenes.

Tempesta’s prints were very popular in the Baroque period and were often used as models by other artists. Scenes in Francesco Allegrini’s ceiling paintings in the Palazzo dei Conservatori in Rome were based on Tempesta’s illustrations for Tasso. Guercino used his prints for his cycle of frescoes (1615–17) in the Casa Pannini in Cento, notably in his Flight of Aeneas, based on an illustration for Ovid’s Metamorphoses. Tempesta’s engraving of King Henry IV of France on horseback (1593) served as a model for portraits of Henry by numerous artists, including Jacques Callot, Peter Paul Rubens and Diego Velázquez.

=== Other activities ===
Tempesta also engaged in cartography. In 1593 he created aa aerial or bird's-eye view of Rome taken from the northwest, composed of 12 separate etched plates that fit together. The map is drawn from an imaginary high vantage point on the west side of the city, which enlarges landmarks like the Vatican while compressing more distant structures. The copper plates were reprinted and updated later in the 17th century, including a notable 1645 edition published by Giovanni Giacomo de Rossi and dedicated to Cardinal Camillo Pamphili. Tempesta's served as a major cartographic template for maps of Rome throughout the 1600s.

Tempesta also drew many designs for tapestries and also produced panel paintings, including two versions of the Crossing of the Red Sea (Budapest, Szépművészeti Múzeum; Rome, Galleria Doria Pamphilj), the Journey of the Three Magi (Catania, Museo civico al Castello Ursino), Pearl-diving in India (Paris, Louvre), Tournament on the Piazza del Castello in Turin ( 1620; Turin, Galleria Sabauda) and a Resurrection (1620–25; Florence, Santa Felicità).

== Gallery ==
Paintings

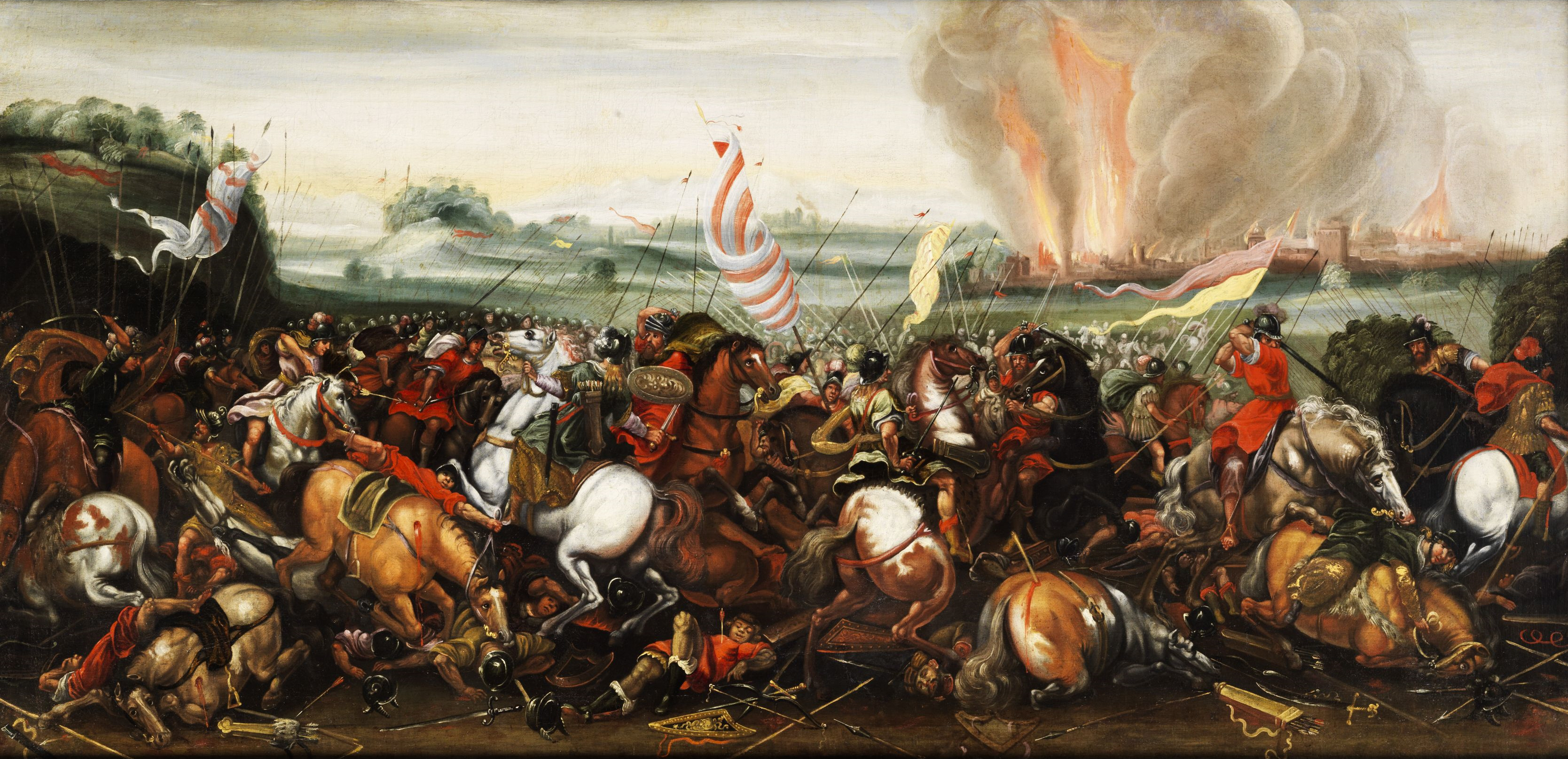
Battle Scene, 101 x 202 cm, priv. col.

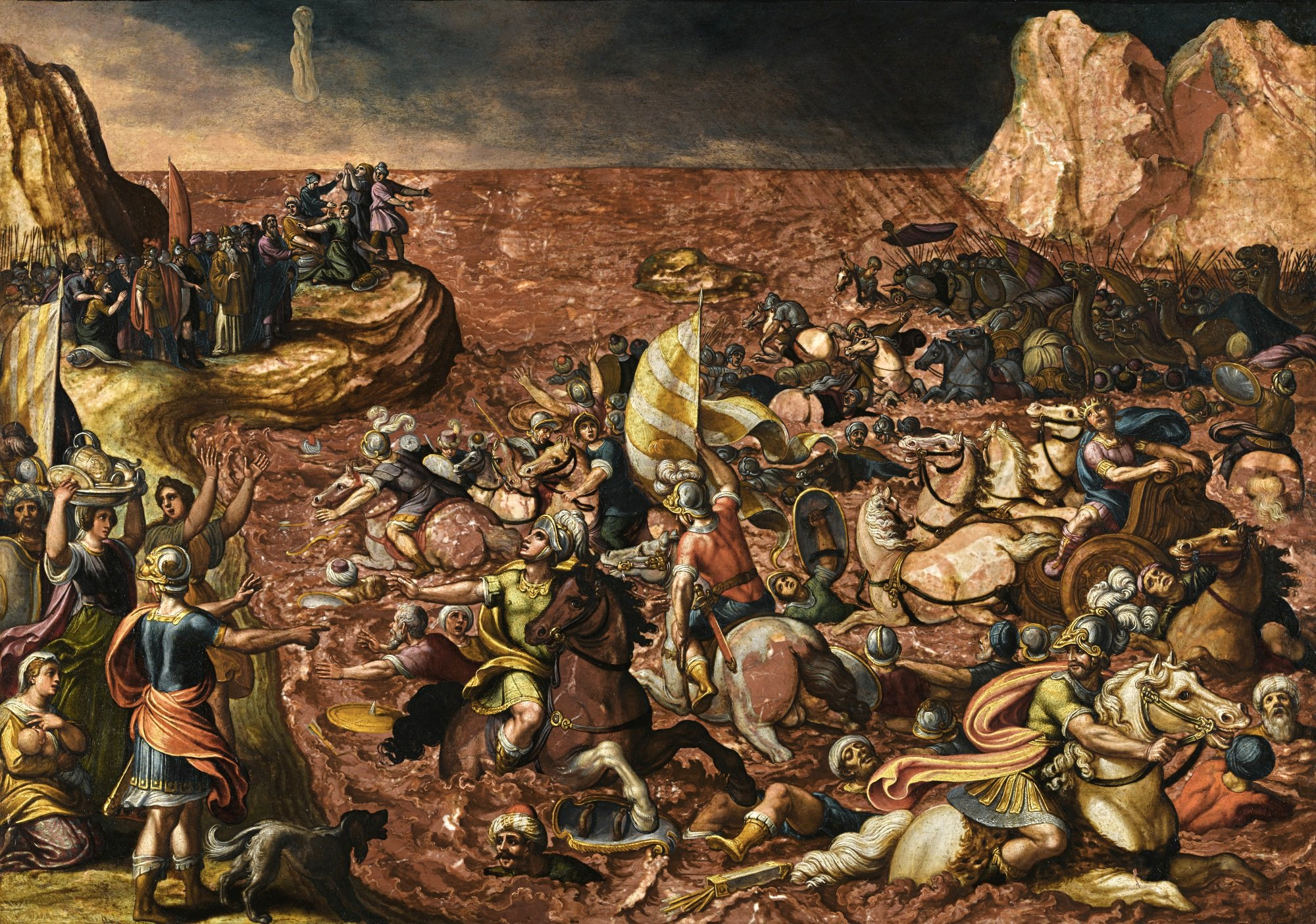
The Egyptians Drowning in the Red Sea, 42.1 x 59.5 cm, priv. col.

Battle Scene, 37 cm x 56.5 cm, Ajaccio, Musée Fesch

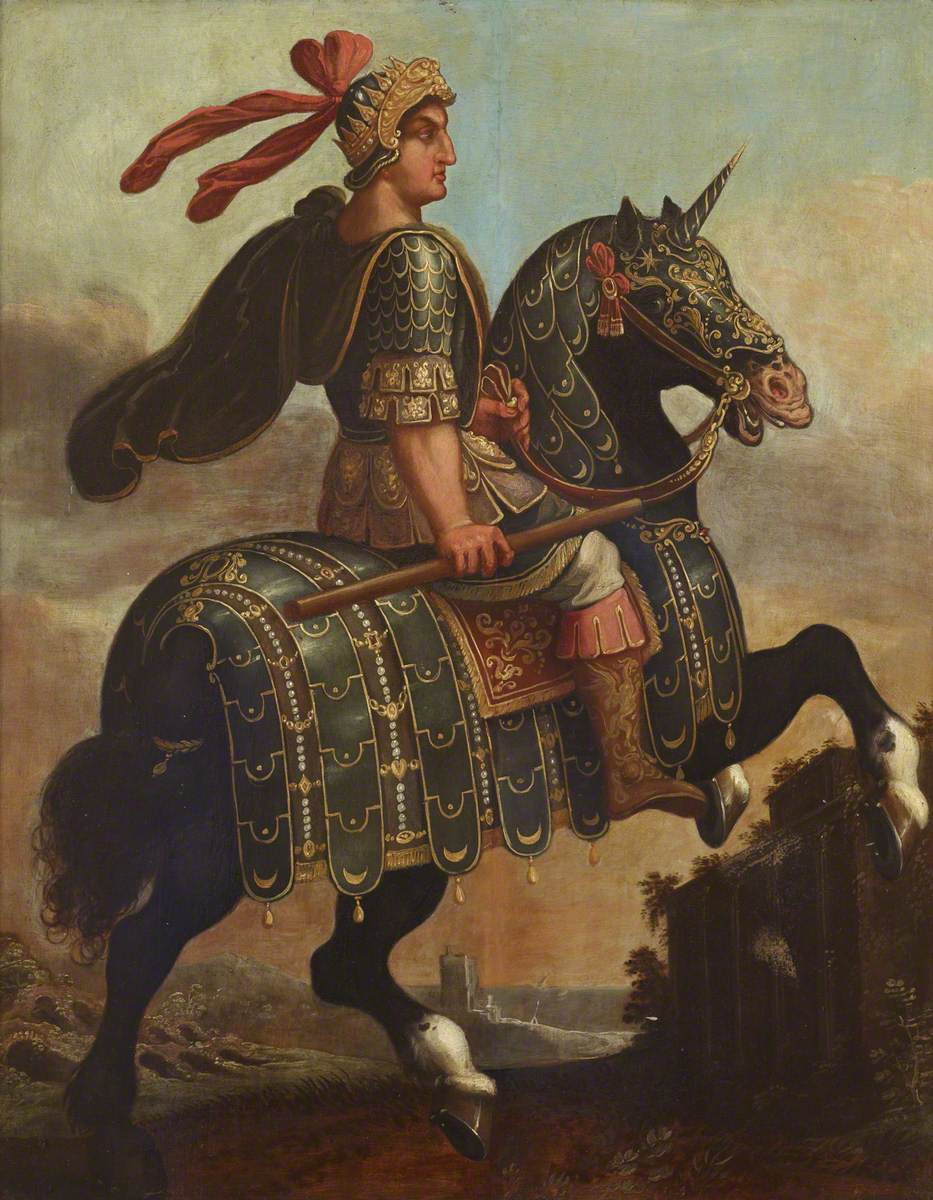
Nero, 65.3 cm x 51.2 cm, National Trust

Adoration of the Magi, 43.8 x 57.8 cm, priv. col.

Engravings

The Roman Commander Cerialis Attacks Near Trier, Metropolitan Museum of Art, New York

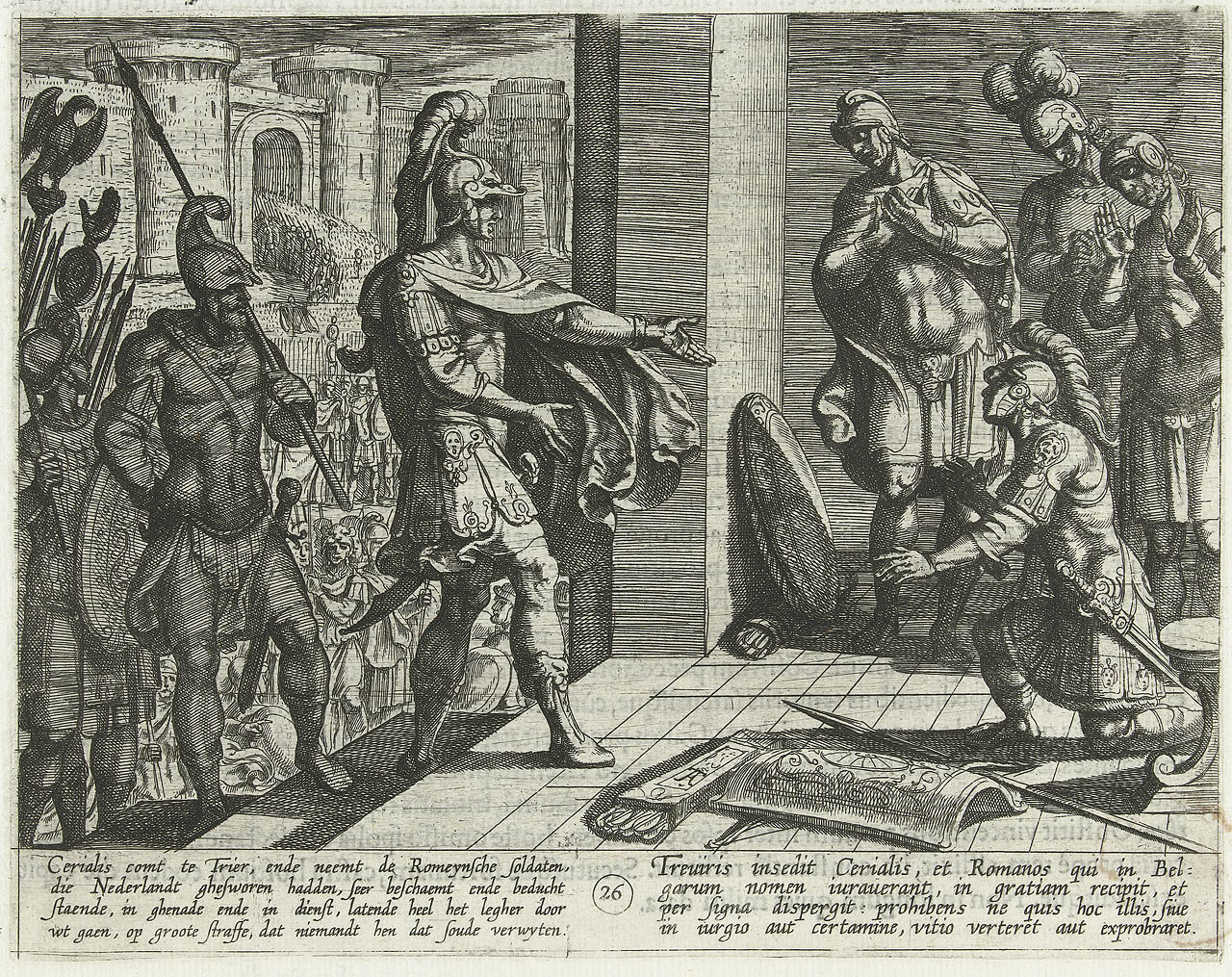
Cerialis grants mercy to soldiers that went over to the enemy, 1612, Amsterdam, Rijksmuseum

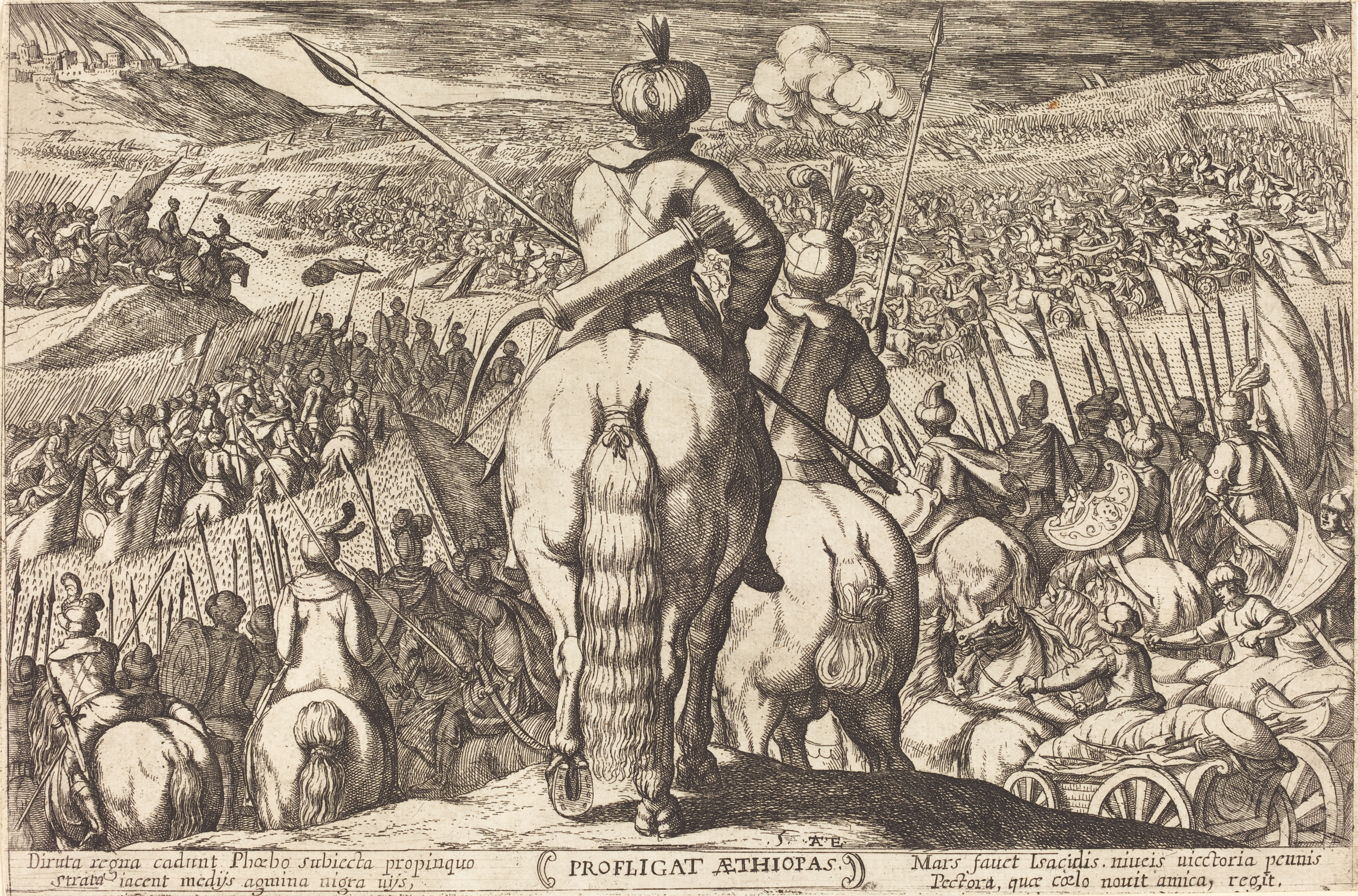
Defeat of the Ethiopians, 1613, National Gallery of Art, Washington, D.C.

The Death of Abimelech, c. 1610, Metropolitan Museum of Art, New York

The Death of Phaeton, 1606, Metropolitan Museum of Art, New York

Alexander's Triumphal Entry into Babylon, 1608, Metropolitan Museum of Art, New York
