= Richelieu, Indre-et-Loire =

Richelieu
- Commune
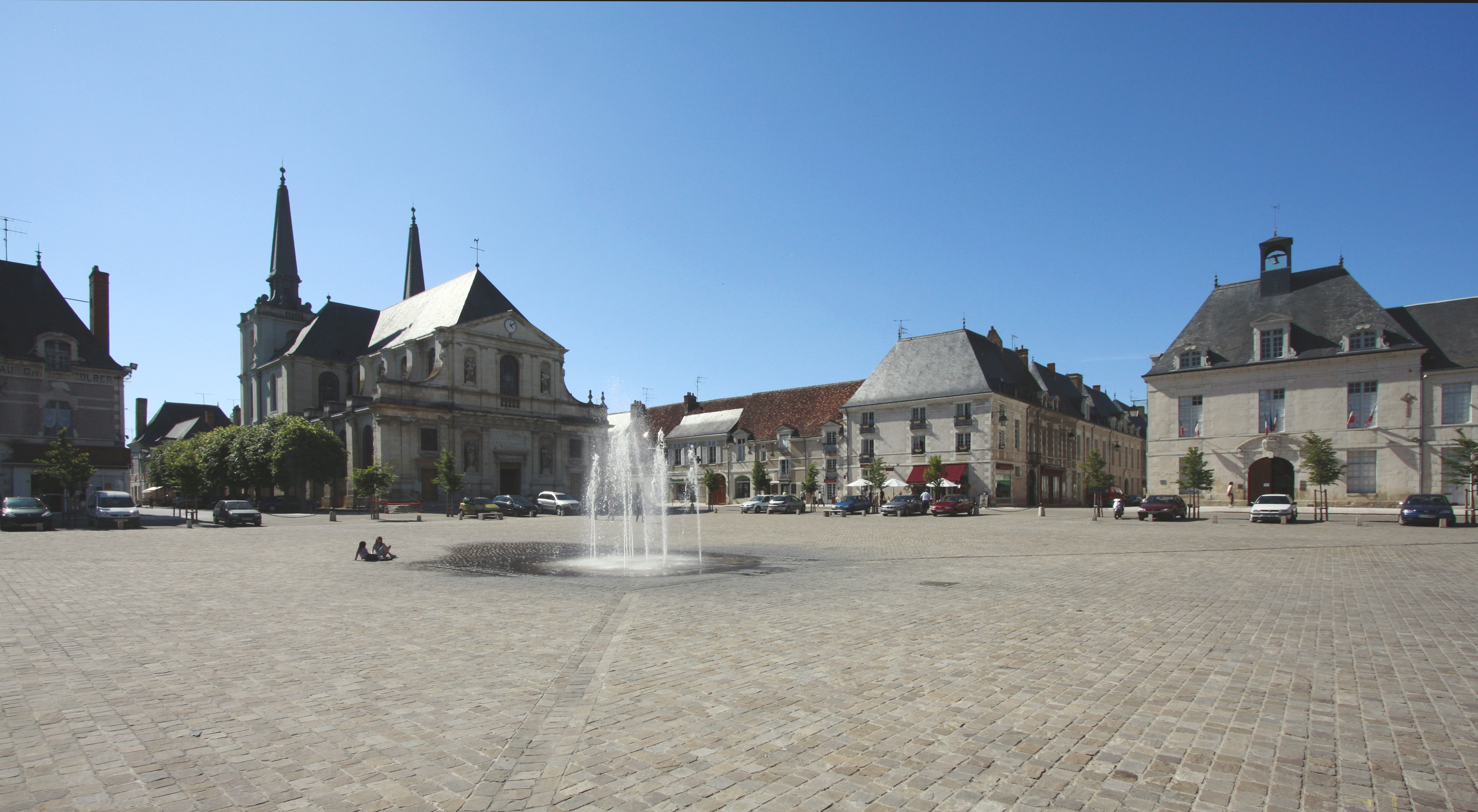
- Place du Cardinal

- Coat of arms
- Location of Richelieu
- Location within France Location within Centre-Val de Loire
- Coordinates: 47°00′54″N 0°19′28″E
- Country: France
- Region: Centre-Val de Loire
- Department: Indre-et-Loire
- Arrondissement: Chinon
- Canton: Sainte-Maure-de-Touraine

Government
  - Mayor (2020–2026): Étienne Martegoutte
- Area^{1}: 5.09 km^{2} (1.97 sq mi)
- Highest elevation: 77 m (253 ft)
- Lowest elevation: 47 m (154 ft)
- Population (2023): 1,598
  - Density: 314/km^{2} (813/sq mi)
- Time zone: UTC+01:00 (CET)
  - Summer (DST): UTC+02:00 (CEST)
- INSEE/Postal code: 37196 /37120
- ^{1} French Land Register data, which excludes lakes, ponds, glaciers > 1 km^{2} (0.386 sq mi or 247 acres) and river estuaries.

Richelieu (French pronunciation: [ʁiʃ(ə)ljø]) is a commune in the Indre-et-Loire department in central France.

It lies south of Chinon and west of Sainte-Maure de Touraine and is surrounded by mostly agricultural land. Its inhabitants are called Richelais, and Richelaises.

Because of its design as the "ideal city" of the seventeenth century, the town is the subject of protective measures for its architecture.

== History ==
In 1343, salt became a state monopoly by order of the Valois king Philip VI, who established the gabelle, the tax on salt. Anjou was part of the "great gabelle" area and encompassed sixteen special tribunals or "salt granaries", including that of Richelieu.

The village was a 17th-century model "new town". It was built at the order of Cardinal Richelieu (1585–1642), who had spent his youth there and bought the village of his ancestors; he had the estate raised to a duché-pairie August 1631. He engaged the architect Jacques Lemercier, who was already responsible for the Sorbonne and the Cardinal's hôtel in Paris, the Palais Cardinal (now the Palais-Royal). With the permission of King Louis XIII, he created from scratch a walled town on a grid arrangement, and, enclosing within its volumes the modest home of his childhood, an adjacent palace, the Château de Richelieu, surrounded by an ornamental moat and large imposing walls enclosing a series of entrance courts towards the town and, on the opposite side, grand axially-planned formal vista gardens of parterres and gravel walks, a central circular fountain, and views reaching to an exedra cut in the surrounding trees and pierced by an avenue in the woodlands extending to the horizon. The pleasure grounds were enclosed in woodland; since their innovative example was followed and extended at Vaux-le-Vicomte and in the gardens of Versailles, and since André Le Nôtre's father was employed at Richelieu in 1629, and it is not improbable that the young boy was employed as well, it is worth making a detailed survey. Construction took place between 1631 and 1642 – the year of the Cardinal's death – and employed around 2000 workers.

A smaller chateau built for the Cardinal's mistress is located 4 km outside the town.

== Geography ==
=== The town ===
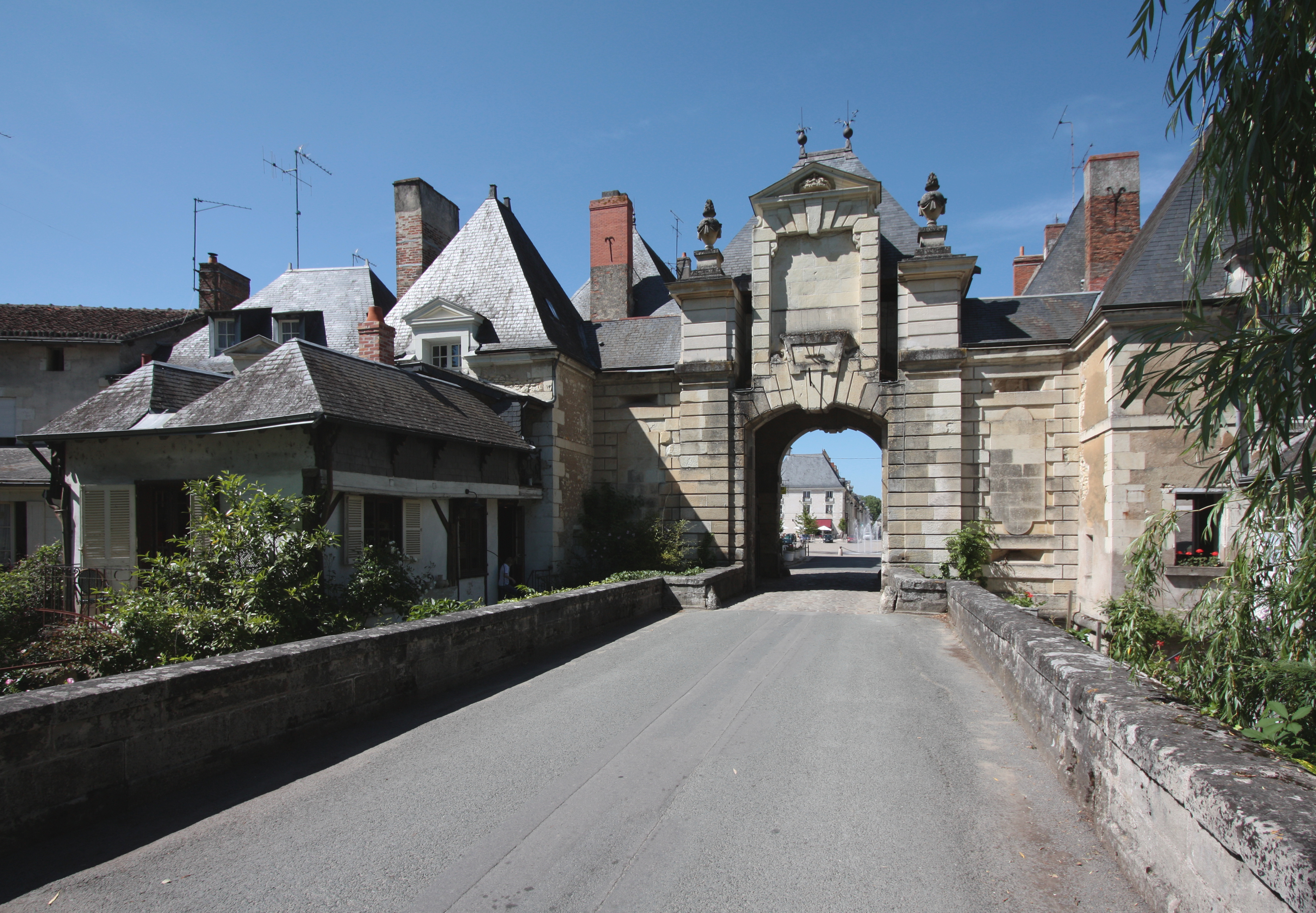
Town gate

The town itself (as distinct from the Château grounds) is about 700 meters long by 500 meters wide. It is accessible by three monumental gates; a fourth, dummy gate exists to respect the symmetry of the whole. The urban plan revolves around two symmetrically arranged places: Place Royale (now Place des Réligieux) and the Place du Cardinal (now Place du Marché), in which are grouped the presbytery, the "audience" (now the town hall), a covered open market hall (still surviving, with wooden pillars and roof beams) and shops.

To ensure quick settlement, the Cardinal imposed no city taxes. In return, buyers of plots for construction undertook to build within two years a "flag" or a house according to the plans and specifications filed with the court of the city, while being required to choose as builder one of the Cardinal's appointees. A register of specific transactions is kept, allowing historians to know today the list of owners of the original buildings of the city.

Upon the death of Cardinal, the city ceased to grow, but continued to have illustrious visitors, like Louis XIV, Jean de La Fontaine, and Voltaire. According to La Fontaine, Richelieu was at the time of writing the "most beautiful village of the universe."

In 1790, during the convening of the Estates General, representatives of the town of Richelieu sat with those of Mirebeau in the delegation of Saumur, within the generality of Tours. The same year, the town of Richelieu was separated from Saumur to integrate with the then new Department of Indre-et-Loire.

== Population ==
Historical population
Year	Pop.	±% p.a.
1968	2,214	—
1975	2,444	+1.42%
1982	2,433	−0.06%
1990	2,223	−1.12%
1999	2,165	−0.29%
2007	1,971	−1.17%
2012	1,848	−1.28%
2017	1,716	−1.47%
2023	1,598	−1.18%
Source: INSEE

== Administration ==
The mayor of Richelieu between 2008 and 2020 was Hervé Novelli, formerly a Secretary of State in the French cabinet. In 2020 Étienne Martegoutte was elected mayor.

== Festival ==
Periodically the town holds historical re-enactments.

== See also ==
- Communes of the Indre-et-Loire department
