= Nicolas Lemercier =

French architect

Nicolas Lemercier or Le Mercier (1541 – 1637) was a French architect or master mason. He was the son of architect/mason Pierre Lemercier and may have been the father of Jacques Lemercier. Works attributed to Nicolas include Pontoise Cathedral and the nave of the church of Saint-Eustache, Paris. He was succeeded at Saint-Eustache by his son-in-law Charles David, who married Nicolas' daughter Anne.
