= Pierre Lemercier =

French architect (1532–1552)

Pierre Lemercier (fl 1532 – 1552) was a 16th-century French architect or master mason. He was first of the Lemercier family of architects/masons. Work attributed to Pierre includes the western tower of Pontoise Cathedral and possible the original design of the church of Saint-Eustache, Paris. He was succeeded at Pontoise and Saint-Eustache by his son Nicolas Lemercier.
