= Israel Silvestre =

French draftsman, etcher and print dealer (1621–1691)

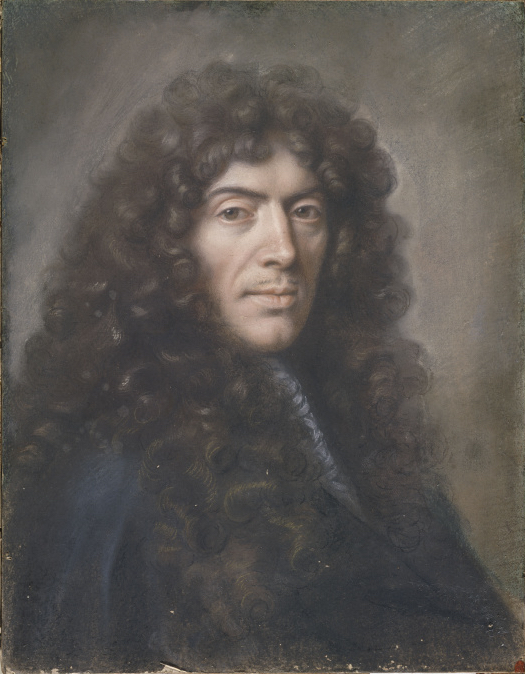
- Portrait of Israel Silvestre by Charles Le Brun, c. 1670
- Born: 13 August 1621; Nancy, Kingdom of France
- Died: 11 October 1691 (aged 70); Paris, Kingdom of France
- Occupations: Draftsman; Etcher
- Movement: Baroque
- Patrons: Louis, Grand Dauphin

Israel Silvestre (13 August 1621 in Nancy – 11 October 1691 in Paris), called the Younger to distinguish him from his father, was a prolific French draftsman, etcher and print dealer who specialized in topographical views and perspectives of famous buildings.

== Biography ==
Orphaned at an early age, Silvestre was taken in by his uncle in Paris, Israël Henriet, an etcher and print-seller, and friend of Jacques Callot. Between 1630 and 1650 he travelled widely in France, Spain and Italy, which he visited three times, and later worked up his sketches as etchings, which were sold singly and in series. His work, especially of Venetian subjects published in the 1660s, influenced eighteenth-century painters of vedute such as Luca Carlevarijs and Canaletto, who adapted his compositions. Some of his etchings depict public ceremonies and ephemeral scenographies, such as the royal party Les Plaisirs de l'Isle enchantée, held in the gardens of Versailles during the reign of Louis XIV, on May 7-13 1664.

In 1661 he inherited Henriet's stock of plates, among which was a large part of the works of Callot, and many of those of Stefano della Bella. In 1662 he was appointed dessinateur et graveur du Roi and in 1673 he was appointed drawing-master to Louis, le Grand Dauphin. From 1668 he was granted workshop space in the galleries of the Louvre, where the practice of housing eminent artists and craftsmen was a tradition that was originated under Henri IV. Silvestre's atelier was large: he had at least two pupils who had separate careers as engravers, François Noblesse and Meunier. In 1670 Charles Le Brun recommended him for membership in the Académie royale de peinture et de sculpture. In 1675 his son, the artist Louis de Silvestre, was born at Sceaux.

At his death he left a large collection of drawings, more than a thousand engravings, and other works of art to his sons, whose own artistic tastes he had nurtured. The family collection was sold at auction in 1810.

== Gallery of images ==
The first feast day of the royal party Les Plaisirs de l'Isle enchantée: Procession by the Knights of Charlemagne (7 May 1664)

The second feast day of the royal party Les Plaisirs de l'Isle enchantée: La Princesse d'Élide (8 May 1664)

The third feast day of the royal party Les Plaisirs de l'Isle enchantée: Ballet at the Castle of Alcina (9 May 1664)

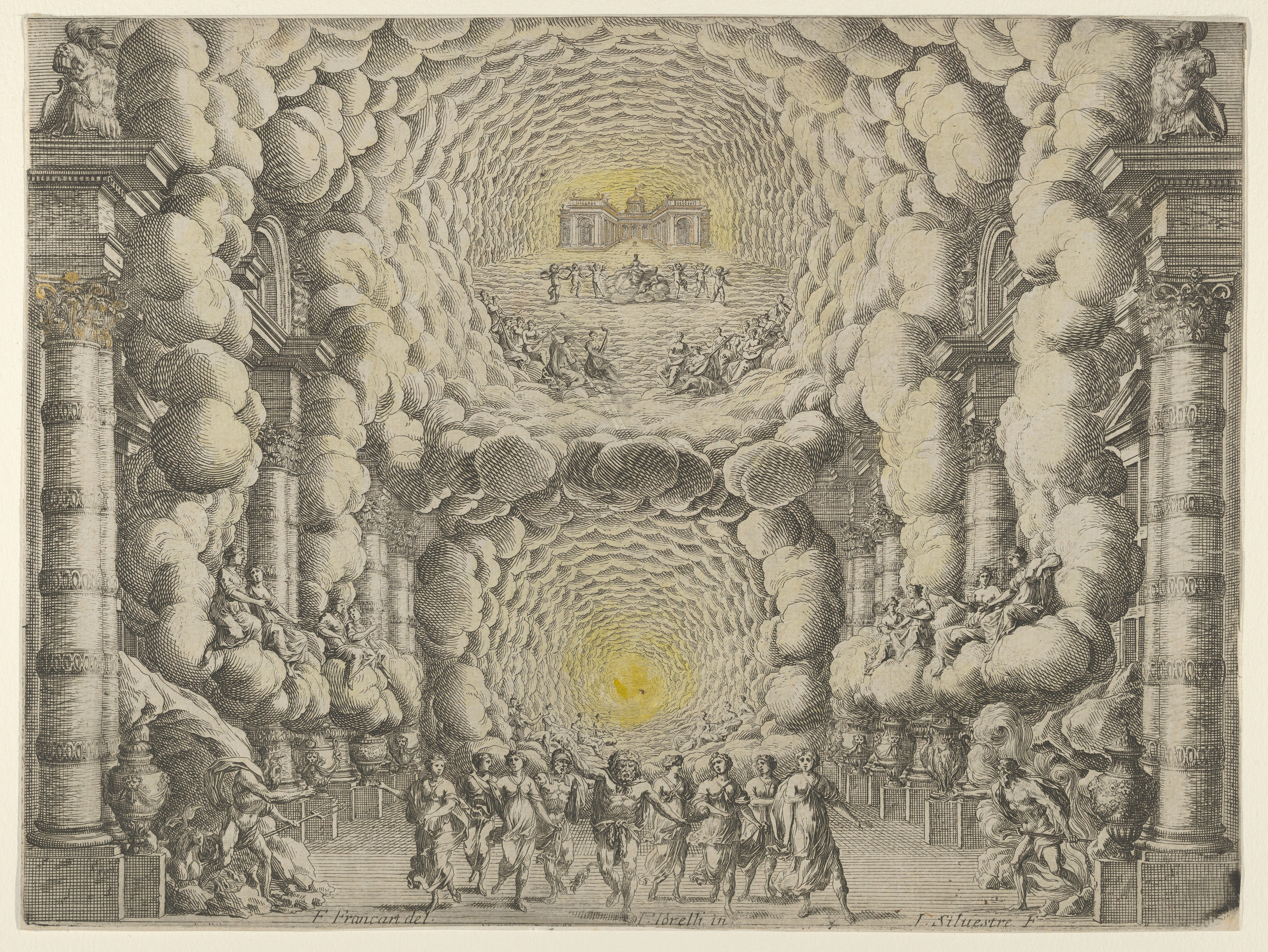
Design for a theater set created by Giacomo Torelli for the ballet Les Noces de Thétis

View of Paris

View of Saint Elizabeth of Hungary Church, Paris

View of the Tour de Nesle and the Palais du Louvre

View of the Porte Saint-Denis

== Sources ==
- Regnault-Delalande, F.L. (1810). Catalogue raisonné d'objets d'arts du cabinet de feu M. de Silvestre (in French). Paris: Self published.
- Silvestre, E. de (1869). Renseignements sur quelques peintres et graveurs des XVIIe et XVIIIe siècles: Israël Silvestre et ses descendants, 2nd edition. Paris: Impr. de Madame veuve Bouchard-Huzard. OCLC 16849729 Copy at Google Books.
