= Château de Richelieu =

Demolished château in Touraine, France

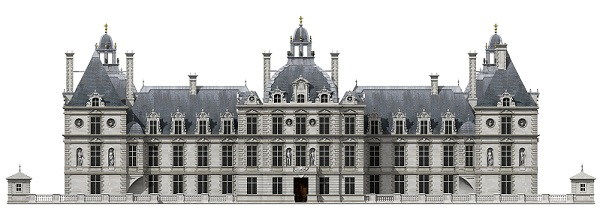
- Reconstruction of the garden façade
- Interactive map of the Château de Richelieu area

General information
- Status: Razed 1805
- Location: Richelieu, Indre-et-Loire, France
- Coordinates: 47.0071°N 0.3259°E
- Construction started: 1631
- Completed: 1642
- Owner: Cardinal Richelieu

Design and construction
- Architect: Jacques Lemercier

The Château de Richelieu was an enormous 17th-century château (manor house) built by the French clergyman, nobleman, and statesman Cardinal Richelieu (1585–1642) in Touraine. It was demolished for building materials in 1805 and almost nothing of it remains today. It lay south of Chinon and west of Sainte-Maure-de-Touraine, just south of what is now Richelieu, Indre-et-Loire, surrounded by mostly agricultural land.

Built between 1631 and 1642 on the site of the former du Plessis family mansion, the château was at the heart of a several-hectare park located south of the current city. The site was designated a historical monument in September 1930.

== History ==
The château, along with a new model village ( "new town"), was built on the orders of Richelieu, who had spent his youth there and purchased the village of his ancestors; he had the estate raised to a duché-pairie in August 1631. He engaged the architect Jacques Lemercier, who had designed the Sorbonne and the Cardinal's hôtel in Paris, the Palais Cardinal (now the Palais-Royal). With the permission of King Louis XIII, Richelieu created from scratch a walled town on a grid plan and, enclosing within its precincts the modest home of his childhood, an adjacent palace (the Château de Richelieu proper) surrounded by an ornamental moat and large imposing walls enclosing a series of entrance courts towards the town and, on the opposite side, grand axially planned formal vista gardens of parterres and gravel walks, a central circular fountain, and views reaching to an exedra cut in the surrounding trees and pierced by an avenue in the woodlands extending to the horizon. The pleasure grounds were enclosed in woodland; since their innovative example was followed and extended at Vaux-le-Vicomte and in the gardens of Versailles, and since André Le Nôtre's father was employed at Richelieu in 1629, it is not improbable that the young boy was employed as well. Construction took place between 1631 and 1642 – the year of the Cardinal's death – and employed around 2,000 workers.

At the Château de Richelieu, the Cardinal maintained one of the largest art collections in Europe and the largest collection of ancient Roman sculpture in France.

After a period of decline, the Château de Richelieu was dismantled in the 19th century — not for any great political reasons, but by an estate agent. It was sold, stone for stone, as building material. Elements of the fabric appear to have been reused on farms in the area.

== Description ==
=== The château ===
In 1639, the then 17-year-old count palatine Carl of Pfalz-Zweibrücken, the future king Charles X of Sweden, visited the not yet finished chateau Richelieu. He left a written description of some of the rooms he saw, and the following passage is a translation.

"We passed the bridge to the chateau and had to our right a nice garden, entered the courtyard in front of the chateau where there is a stable on one side with room for 60 horses. From here we went into the inner courtyard and found us in front of the entrance leading to the main staircase. Next to the doors were four large columns made from red marble and on top of these other, smaller columns made from the same material, on top of these were very large statues in the shape and size of humans. Apart from these the courtyard had an additional 31 large statues and 30 smaller ones in the shape of busts. The side of the courtyard leading to the entrance of the chateau is not built as high as the other three but has an open gallery on the roof. When we came into the courtyard we turned right and entered the chateau itself on a large staircase.

First came the chamber of Moses, whose story is painted on the open fireplace. The walls on the other sides are decorated with beautiful tapestries, the ceiling however is sculpted and covered in gold. The cover and curtains of the bed have been embroidered by the cardinals’ mother in gold, silver and silk and is very artistically done.

The second is the Porcille-chamber, whose story is painted on the open fireplace.

The third is the Lucrecia-chamber, whose death is also painted on the open fireplace. All these chambers are lined with silken tapestries, some of them embroidered, well dressed, and the beds decorated with curtains and bedcovers in the best possible way, to make it all wonderful and splendid.

The fourth is the queen's apartment. In “le Cabinet”, where the portraits of Henry IV (of France), his spouse, son, and his spouse, as well as other persons of royal blood are to be found, in all 92 paintings.

The fifth is the queens chamber, decorated with red velvet tapestries, just like the curtains on the bed. The ceiling however is sculptured and painted with gold.

The sixth is the queen's antechamber, also hung with silken tapestries and gold painted ceiling. Justice and mercy are depicted on the open fireplace.

The seventh is the king's wardrobe, where the death of Hercules is described, and the window fittings are made of fine silver.

The eighth room is “le Cabinet” of the king, full of beautiful landscape paintings and very rare, given to the cardinal by the duke of Mantua. The ceiling is sculptured and painted with gold and the walls are covered with costly tapestries.

The ninth is the kings chamber with very costly tapestries embroidered with silver and gold, and so are the bedcurtains and the chairs. The floor is made from black and white marble, and the ceiling is gilt.

The tenth is the king's antechamber, very costly and with a representation of Vulcan on the open fireplace. The fittings and locks on the doors, and the window fittings are made from silver in this room too.

The eleventh is the cardinal's apartment, and this room has two open fireplaces. On one is painted Moses with his stone tablets and the inscription: Qui peccat in uno, factus est omnium reus, meaning: The one who sins in one way, sins in all. On the other is Solomon painted, when he worshiped the idols, and the tapestries are very beautiful, and the chamber wonderfully decorated with paintings and proverbs. Among the paintings is one of the hunting party the princess of Lothringen arranged for the king. Here are also many emblems or proverbs, among them the following: 1 Erit altera merces, 2 Ultima meta, 3 In aeternum, 4 Aliena meispra fero, 5 Nec momentum sine linea, 6 Non uritnisi leasus, 7 Minimum pressus punget, 8 Beatus sare quam accipere, 9 Eminius prospicienti nihil novum, 10 Virtutis honors praemium.

The twelfth is the cardinal's antechamber, and on the stove is Hercules painted with this inscription: Armandus Richelieu, Hercules admirandis.

The thirteenth is the cardinals chamber, and on the stove stands Saturn.

The fourteenth is “le Cabinet” of the cardinal, where are two globes made from metal, one of the sky and one of the earth. These were found in Nancy and taken away by the duke of Lothringen. On the mantlepiece stands a bust of Julius Caesar, the head made of porphyry and the body of alabaster.

The fifteenth is the gallery, a room that is not yet finished. It has paintings of the fortresses that during the time of king Louis were conquered from the enemy. Here are also 6 columns of red marble that cost 18 000 gulden. After this we returned downstairs.

The sixteenth is “la Basse salle”, where the portraits of king Gustavus Adolphus of Sweden, the cardinal Richelieu, and the grand duke of Tuscany are found, and after this yet further down we found many, many statues made of marble, so that the overall number of statues exceeds 200. Here is also a table 6 ½ feet (pieds) long and 5 feet wide, made from all sorts of valuable stones, among these agates and jasper, and in the middle a very large agate, 14 inches (pouce) wide, and this stone alone is valued at a million.

The cardinal has also made a zoo here, 6 kilometres (4 mi) in circumference, and is building a church so that this will in time become a most lovely place.

=== The grounds ===
The château was approached by a long double avenue of trees forming one of three avenues that met at a patte d'oie before the outer gates, which curved inwards to form half of a circle on the ground that was completed by the pattern formed by the three approaching approaches through the town; this nodal feature, with its flanking pavilions, survives, in the town's Place du Cardinal. In the two spandrel shapes enclosed behind the outer walling were matching enclosed outer service courts. Through the arched central gateway the visitor entered the vast basse cour, with common stabling for a hundred horses in a flanking courtyard to the left, with barns and lodgings for gardeners and estate workers, and to the right, an identical courtyard with elite stabling, bakehouse and other offices. Continuing along the axis one passed through a smaller cour d'honneur enclosed by matching ranges each with a central dome and end pavilions. There was a central fountain. Beyond was the rectangular moat that surrounded the château itself, with its inner court, reached across a central drawbridge leading to the grand domed gatehouse, a handsome structure with Hercules and Mars in niches on either side and a statue of Louis XIII above, with a statue of Fame crowning the dome.

The inner court was about two thirds the width of the avant-cour. The main corps de logis was domed; its left-hand range enclosed the modest house of Richelieu's youth. Wings enclosed the court on either side; once again they had end pavilions with squared domes. On the façades of the piano nobile there were niches in the piers between windows, containing statues, and niches in the ground floor containing busts.

The garden front looked onto a square parterre that was itself surrounded by moats and reached by a central bridge. Like the two outer courts, it was divided in four plats with a central feature. To either side a major cross-axis extended the patterned gardens. Ahead, at the terminus of the main axis, the woods drew back in an exedra.

=== The site today ===
The walled gardens of the château remain and are open as a public park. It is the property of the Chancellerie des Universités de Paris. A few fragments of the palace buildings remain, such as the bridges over the moats, the "Honour Gateway", and some buildings from the service ranges; one of the latter is in use as a kind of museum or information centre and includes pictures and models of the palace as it once was. This building is covered in carved graffiti from visitors to the site, dating back at least as far as 1905, and including dated initials from the periods of both World War I and World War II, plus some graffiti from bearers of the Richelieu name.

There is a small shop and management office at the entrance, and a car park between that and the town.

== Gallery ==
=== Historical images ===
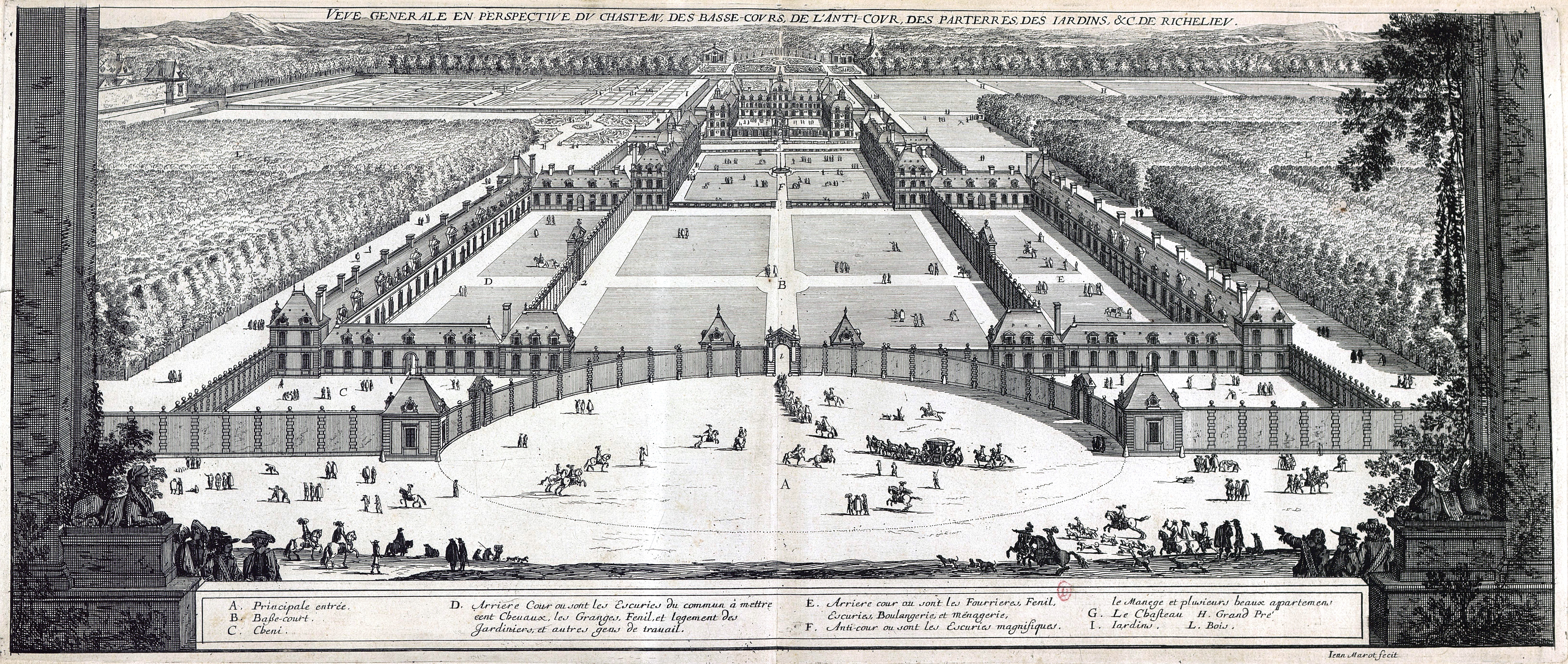
General perspective view of the Château de Richelieu from Le Magnifique Chasteau de Richelieu... (ca. 1657) by Jean Marot

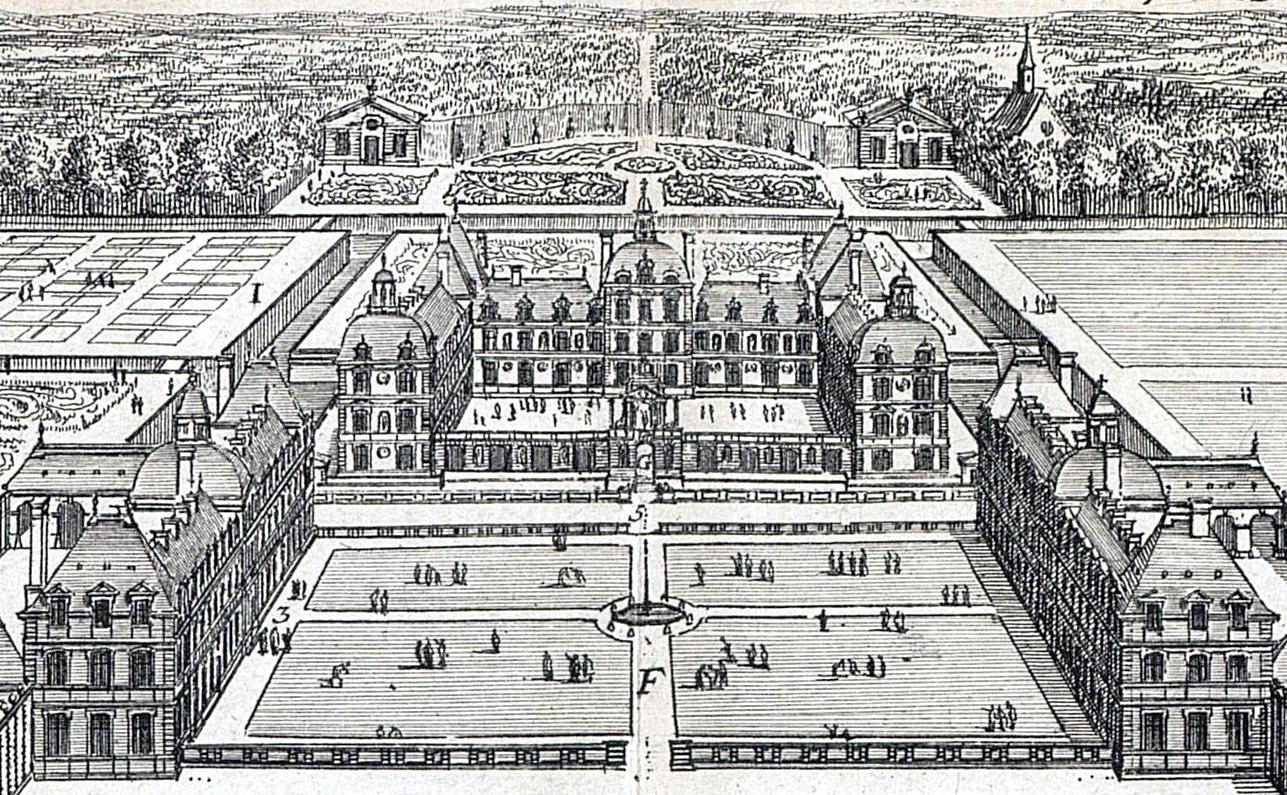
Detail of General perspective view of the Château de Richelieu from Le Magnifique Chasteau de Richelieu... (ca. 1657) by Jean Marot

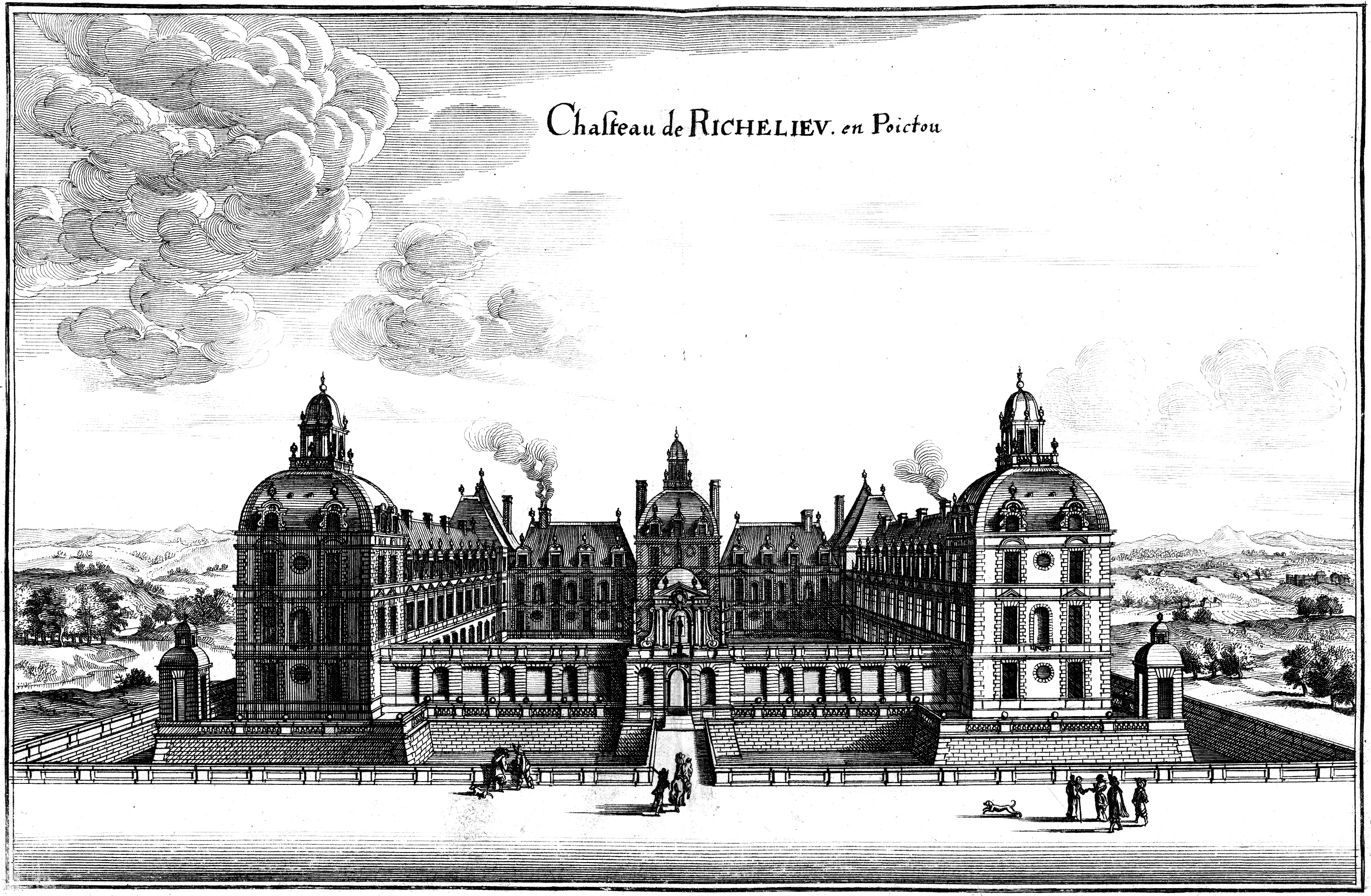
A 17th century engraving from the Topographia Galliae

=== Extant remnants ===
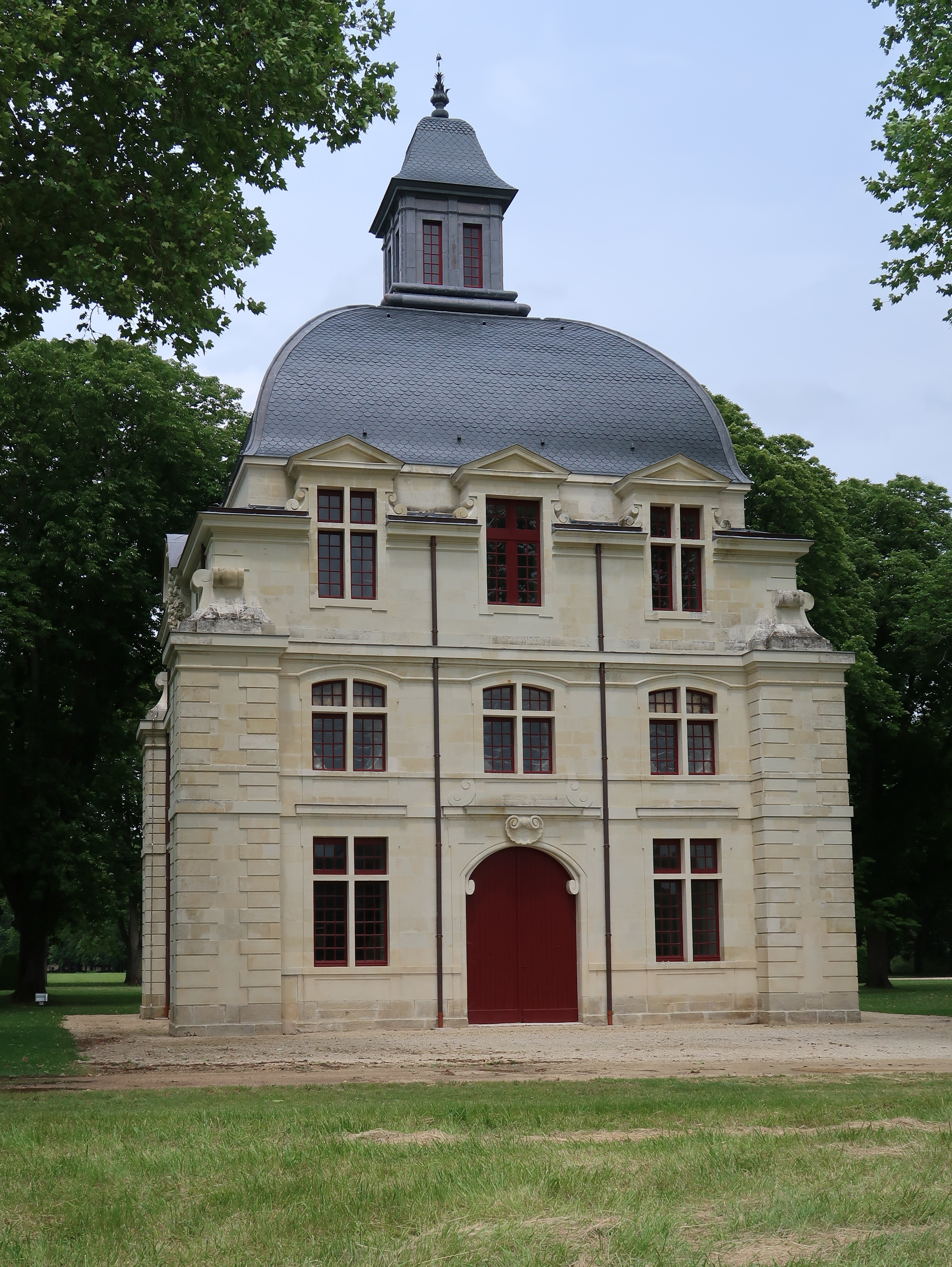
The central pavilion of the stables (the wing of which was demolished ca.1900).

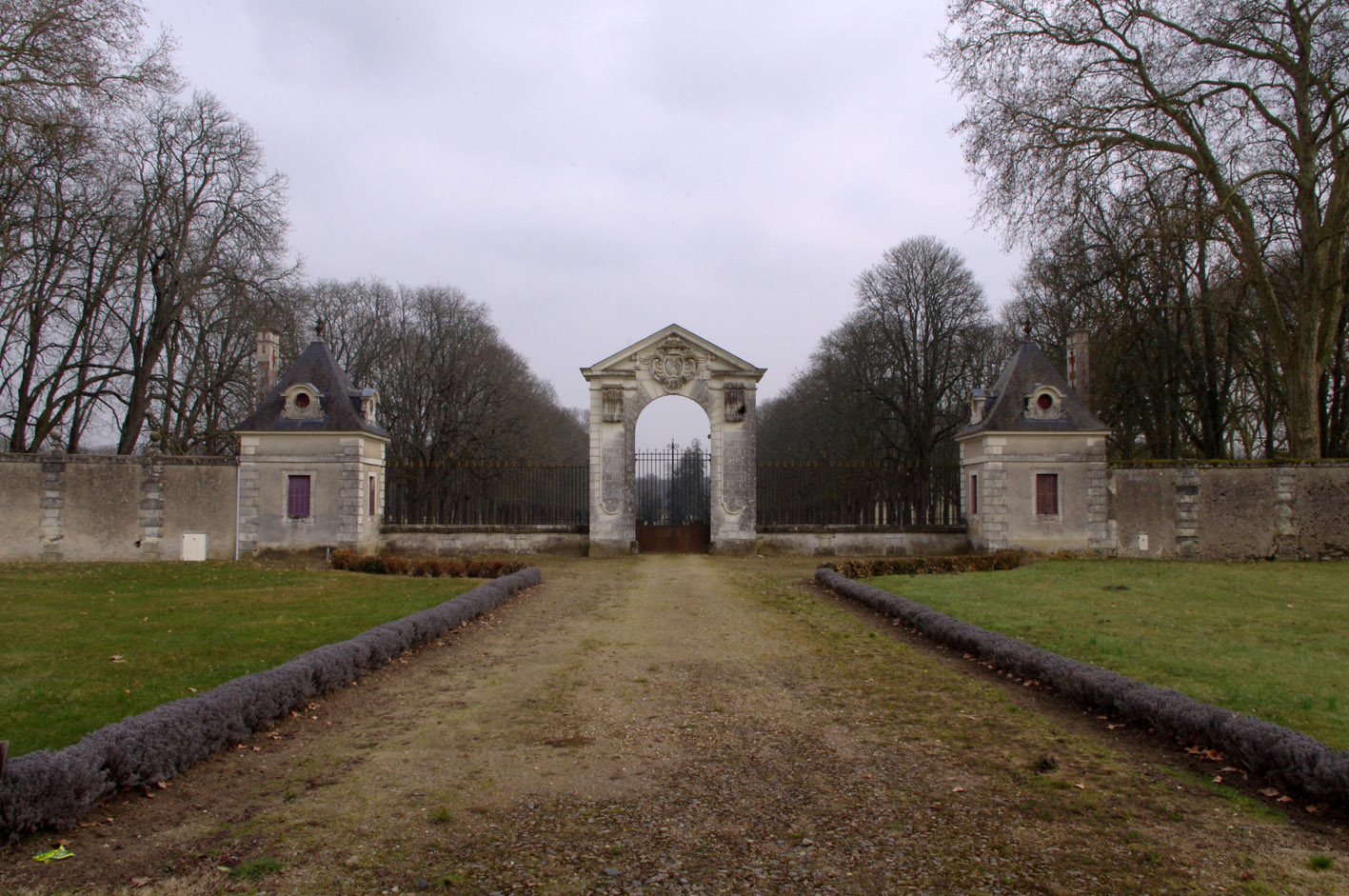
Grand entry hémicycle (which retains its pavilions and portal).

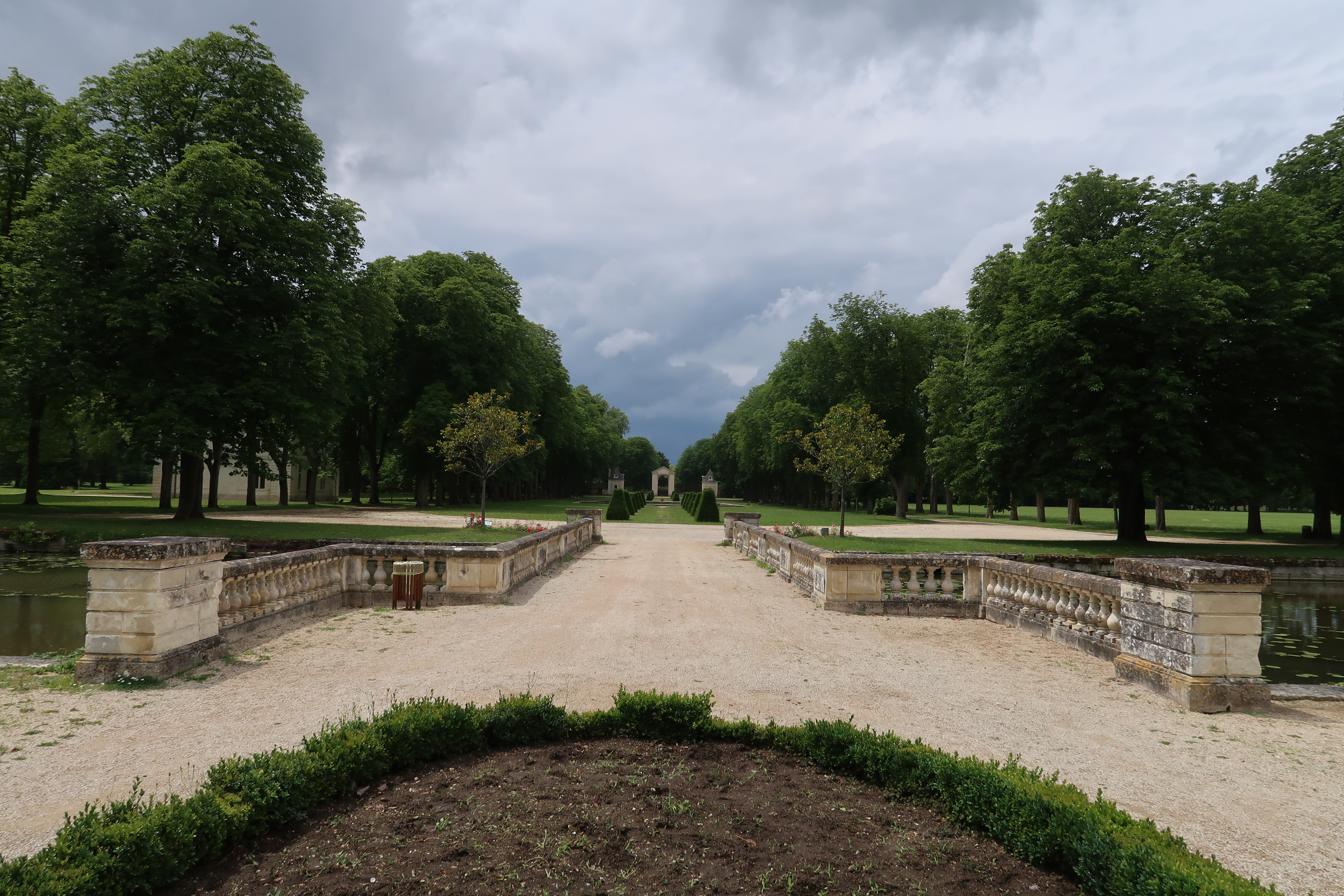
The Parc de Richelieu

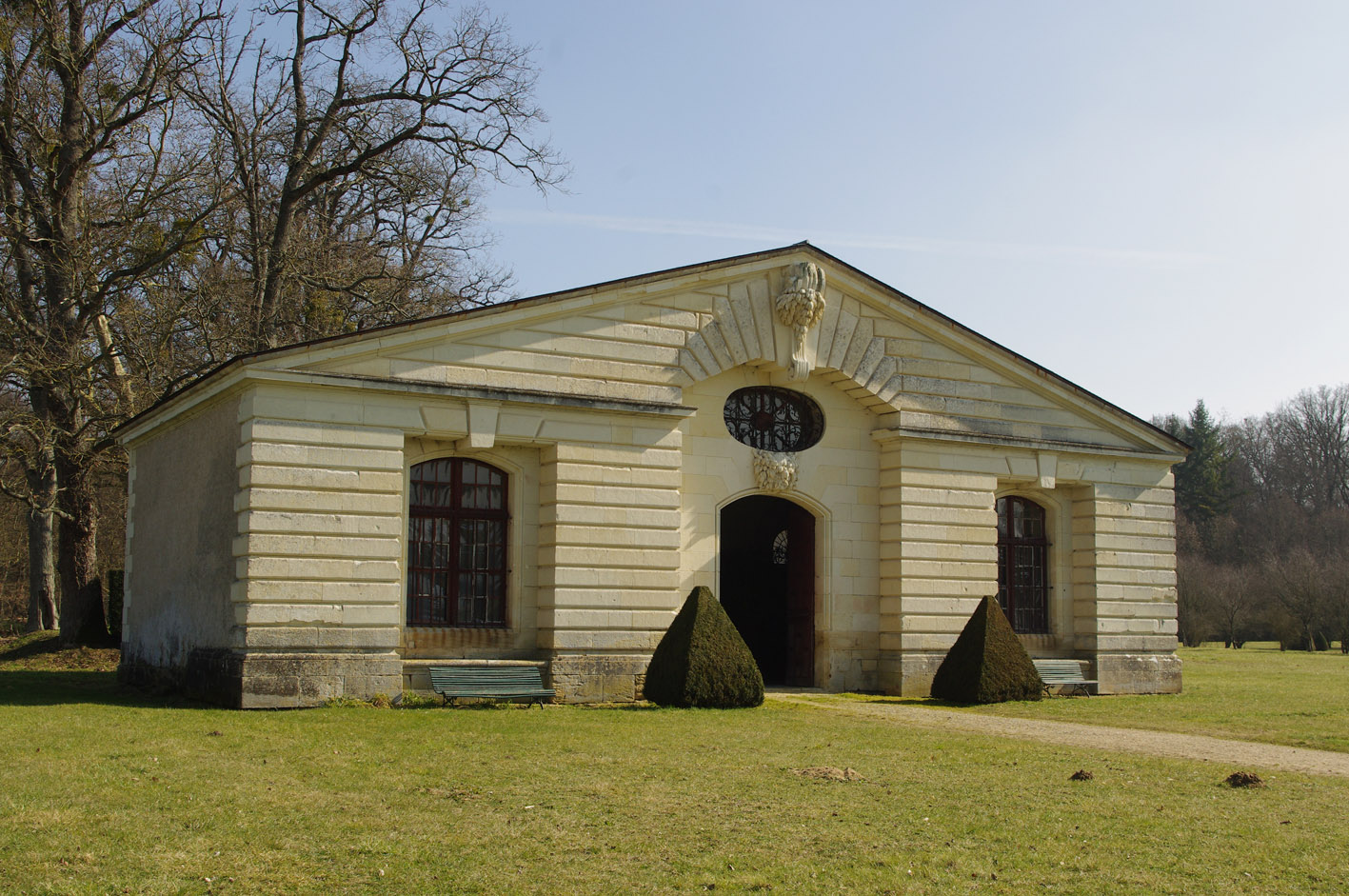
Pavillon de l'orangerie

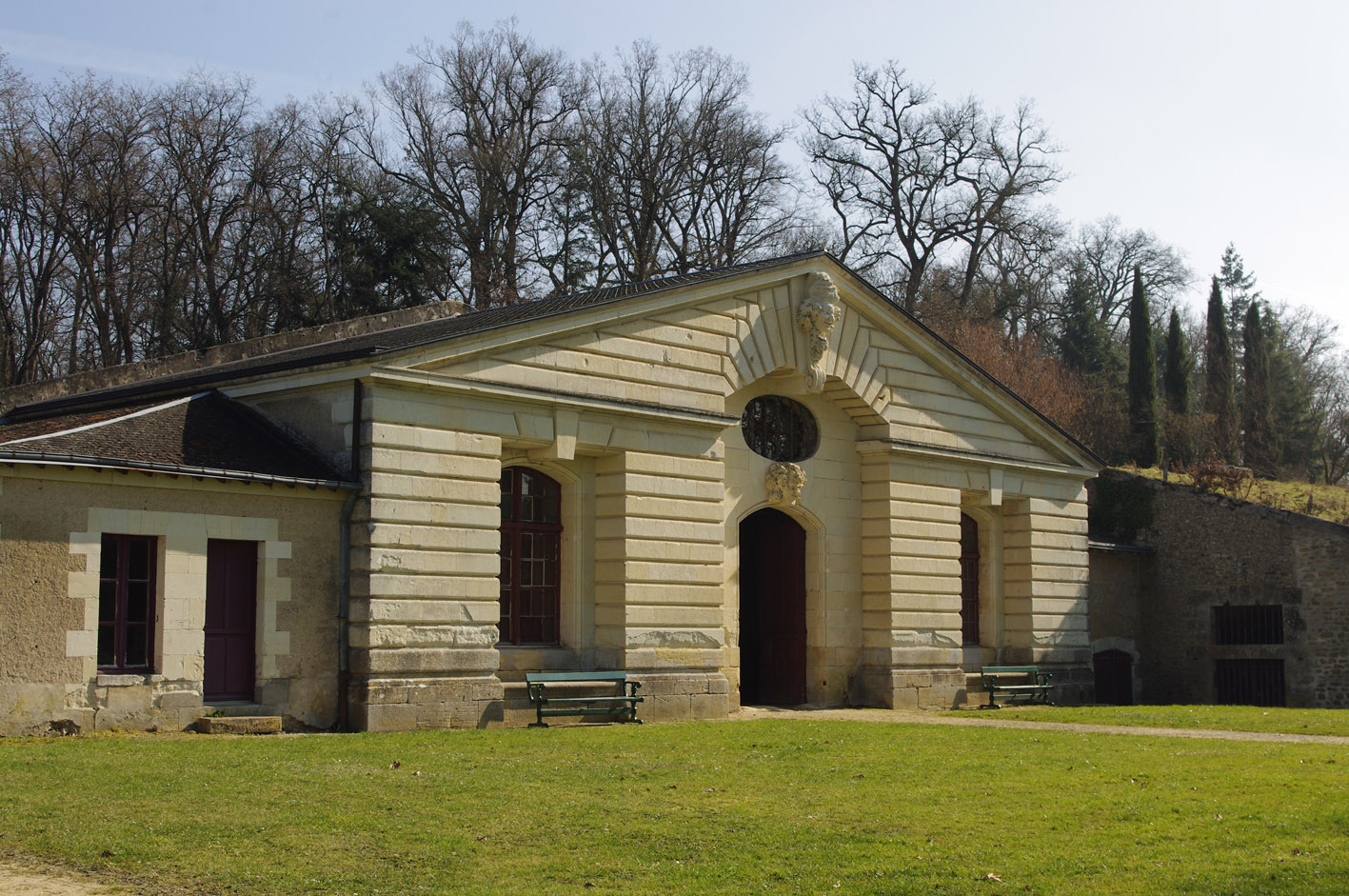
Pavillon du chai et des caves (winery and cellars)
