= Pietro Santi Bartoli =

Italian painter (1635–1700)

- The adventus of Marcus Aurelius in Syria. Plate from Bartoli's Admiranda Romananum Antiquitatum ac Veteris Sculpturae Vestigia (1693)
- Born: 1635; Perugia, Papal States
- Died: 7 November 1700 (aged 64–65); Rome, Papal States
- Education: Jean Lemaire; Poussin
- Known for: Etching
- Notable work: Admiranda Romananum Antiquitatum ac Veteris Sculpturae Vestigia (1693)
- Movement: Neoclassicism

Pietro Santi Bartoli (also Sante or Santo; 1635 – 7 November 1700) was an Italian engraver, draughtsman, painter and antiquarian.

== Life and career ==
Born in Bartola, near Perugia, in 1635, Bartoli moved to Rome as a youth. There he studied painting under Jean Lemaire and Poussin, but soon abandoned it to devote himself entirely to engraving. He became a member of the circle of artists and scholars associated with Cassiano dal Pozzo and Cardinal Camillo Massimo. He formed particularly close ties with the antiquarian Giovanni Pietro Bellori, who provided learned commentary on his prints of ancient Roman monuments and artefacts.

Bartoli acted as a bridge between the Renaissance antiquarian compilations of Antonio Lafreri and the sweeping 18th-century architectural visions of Giovanni Battista Piranesi. Unlike Piranesi's later, more theatrical and imaginative reconstructions, Bartoli focused on systematic, faithful visual documentation of Roman ruins, bas-reliefs, columns, sepulchres, and frescoes. His plates, created using a burin and an etching needle, won him European fame as an engraver. Some of his engravings, such as the 123 plates depicting the bas-reliefs of the Trajan's Column and the 78 plates of the Column of Marcus Aurelius, were frequently reprinted and contributed to the rise of Neoclassicism. Winckelmann himself praised Bartoli's work, recommending that young artists wishing to familiarise themselves with antiquity should study and emulate it.

Bartoli's 35 plates depicting the ancient paintings from the Tomb of the Nasonii on the Via Flaminia (Rome, 1680), were highly prized and much sought-after, both in his own time and thereafter. Following Bartoli’s death, his son Francesco expanded upon this work by adding reproductions of other paintings discovered during archaeological excavations at the site. Even more influential was the reproduction of the 55 plates of the illustrated Vergilius Vaticanus, titled Antiquissimi Virgiliani codicis fragmenta et picturae ex Bibliotheca Vaticana ad priscas imaginum formas... incisae. Bartoli engraved this work at the urging of Cardinal Massimo in 1677 and initially published it in a limited number of copies. Subsequent editions featuring the manuscript’s text, edited by Giovanni Gaetano Bottari, appeared in the following century (1741, 1782, 1797).

For Massimo, Bartoli also executed drawings of ancient Roman paintings and mosaics (now in the Glasgow University Library). Following Bellori's death in 1696, Bartoli became papal antiquarian and antiquarian for Queen Christina of Sweden. In 1699, with the engraver Domenico de' Rossi, he realized Romanae Magnitudinis Monumenta, a major collection of copperplate engravings of ancient Roman monuments, temples, and theaters. Many of the plates adapted earlier works published by Giacomo Lauro in his Antiquae Urbis Splendor (1612-1615). Bartoli adapted 138 of Lauro's original plates and engraved 16 new ones.

Bartoli also produced a number of portraits, including one of the Spanish Archbishop of Lima, Turibius of Mogrovejo, as well as a lesser-known portrait of Giuseppe Maria Mitelli in the attire of a member of the Accademia Clementina. Bartoli died in Rome on 7 November 1700, and was buried in the church of San Lorenzo in Lucina, alongside his master Nicolas Poussin.

== Selected works ==
Among his works are:

- Admiranda Romanarum Antiquitatum ac veteris Sculptura vestigia; 81 plates.
- Romanae magnitudinis Monumenta; 138 plates.
- Veteres arcus Augustorum triumphis insignes; 52 plates.
- Colonna di Marco Aurelio (Column of Marcus Aurelius); 78 plates.
- Colonna traiana eretta dal Senato, e popolo romano all'imperatore Traiano (Trajan's Column) with Alphonsus Ciacconius; (1673) 128 plates.
- Pitture antiche di Roma, e del sepolcro de' Nasoni; (1702) 123 plates.
- The Nozze Aldobrandini; (Roman 1st century Aldobrandini Wedding fresco) two sheets.
- Le pitture antiche delle grotto di Roma; assisted by F. Bartoli; 94 plates, 1680 & 1706.
- Veterum lucernae sepulcrales, collectae ex cavernis et specubus subterraneis, with Alexander Duke and Giovanni Pietro Bellori 1691 & 1704; 119 plates.
- Scenes from the life of St. Peter; after Lanfranco.
- Subjects from Raphael's Bible ; 42 plates.
- Grottesques; after Raphael; inscribed Parerya atque ornamenta in Vaticano; 43 plates.
- Antiquissimi Virgiliani Codicis fragmenta et picturae, ex Biblioteca Vaticano;
- Birth of the Virgin; after Albani.
- Virgin and Child in the Clouds; after Ludovico Carracci.
- Coriolanus and his Family and San Carlo Borromeo led by an Angel; after Annibale Carracci.
- Daniel in the Lions' Den; after Pietro da Cortona.
- St. John preaching; after Mola.
- Adoration of the Magi; after Raphael; in three sheets.
- Jupiter nursed by Amalthea; Jupiter hurling thunderbolts at Giants; Hylas carried off by Nymphs; Sophonisba before Masinissa; Continence of Scipio; after Giulio Romano.
- St. Stephen.
- St. Bernard enchaining the Devil; Theatre erected in St. Peter's for a Canonization;
- The sepulchral Monument of Pope Urban VIII.

== Gallery ==
Frieze of the Column of Marcus Aurelius, plate from Bartoli's Columna Cochlis M. Aurelio Antonino Augusto dicata, 1704

The Pyramid of Cestius, plate from Bartoli's Gli antichi sepolcri, 1767

The Tomb of Caecilia Metella, plate from Bartoli's Gli antichi sepolcri, 1767

Perseus marries Andromedas, plate from Bartoli's Admiranda Romananum Antiquitatum ac Veteris Sculpturae Vestigia (1693)

Aldobrandini Wedding, plate from Bartoli's Admiranda Romananum Antiquitatum ac Veteris Sculpturae Vestigia (1693)

Relief of an actor, plate by Bartoli from Filippo Buonarroti's Osservazioni istoriche sopra alcuni medaglioni antichi (1698)

Arch of Septimius Severus, plate by Bartoli from Joseph-Marie Suarez's Arcus L. Septimii Severi Aug. (1676)

The Arrival of the Etruscans in Latium, plate by Bartoli after Polidoro da Caravaggio and Maturino da Firenze

== Bibliography ==
- Bryan, Michael (1889). Walter Armstrong; Robert Edmund Graves (eds.). Dictionary of Painters and Engravers, Biographical and Critical. Vol. II L-Z. London: George Bell and Sons. p. 449.
- Petrucci, Alfredo (1964). "BARTOLI, Pietro Santi (Piersanti)". Dizionario Biografico degli Italiani (in Italian). Vol. 6: Baratteri–Bartolozzi. Rome: Istituto dell'Enciclopedia Italiana. OCLC 883370.
- Negro Spina, Annamaria (2003). "Bartoli, Pietro Sante [Santi]". Grove Art Online. Oxford: Oxford University Press. doi:10.1093/gao/9781884446054.article.T006590.
- Modolo, Mirco (October–December 2010). "Dal clivus Scauri al vicus Capitis Africae: gli affreschi della vigna Guglielmina a Roma nei disegni dei Bartoli". Bollettino d'Arte (in Italian). 8: 1–20.
- Pace, Claire (2015). "Bartoli, Pietro Santi (Sante; 1635–1700)". In Nancy Thomson de Grummond (ed.). Encyclopedia of the History of Classical Archaeology. Routledge. pp. 122–124. ISBN 9781134268610.
