= Claude Duchet =

French engraver and publisher

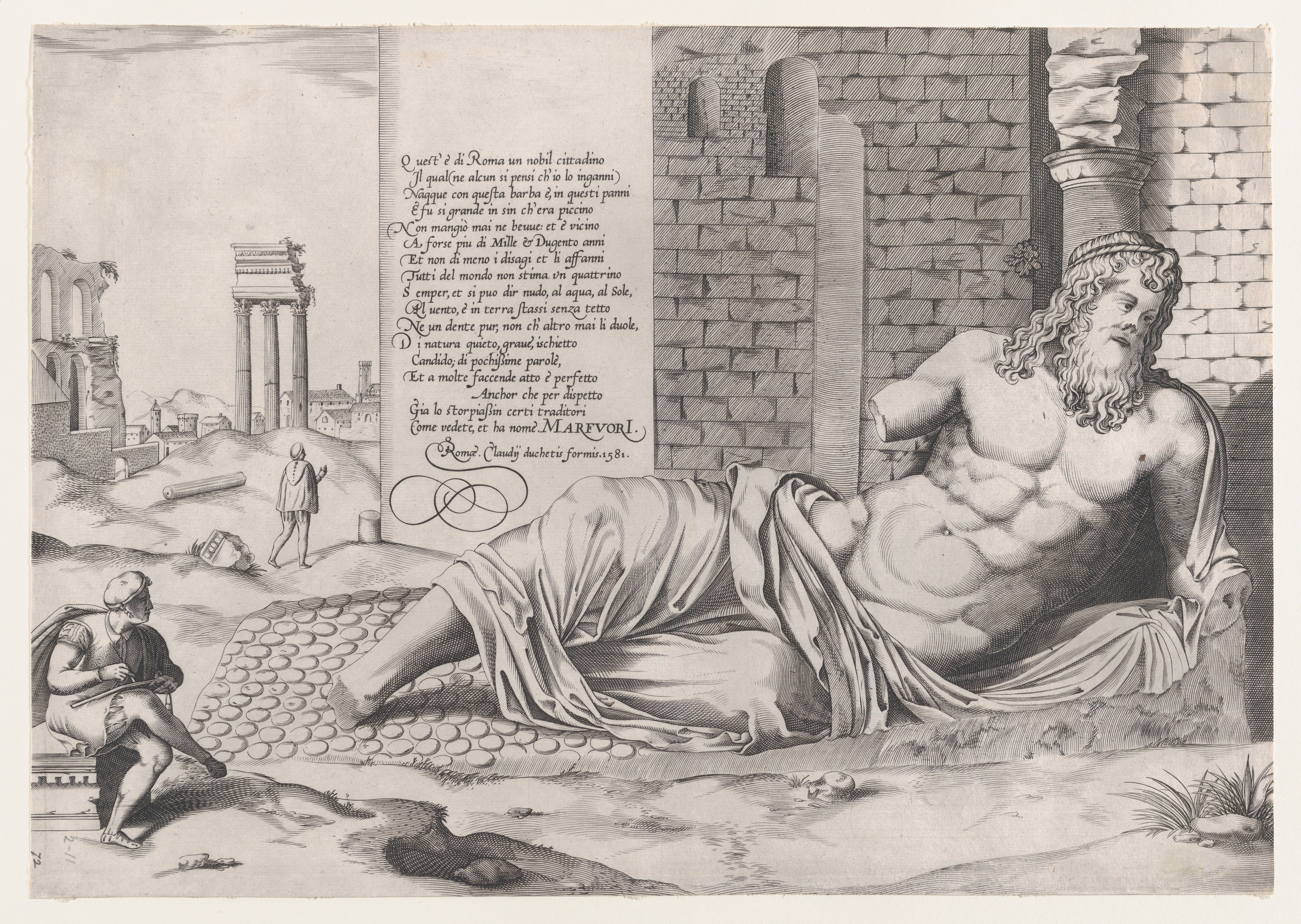
- Marforio from Duchet's Speculum Romanae Magnificentiae, 1581, Metropolitan Museum of Art, New York
- Born: 1552; Orgelet, in the County of Burgundy
- Died: 9 December 1585 (aged 32–33); Rome, Papal States
- Known for: Etcher and copper engraver
- Movement: Mannerism

Claude Duchet (1552 – 9 December 1585) was a Burgundian engraver and publisher active in Rome.

== Biography ==
Claude Duchet was born in Orgelet, in the County of Burgundy. His mother was the sister of the renowned printer, Antoine Lafréry. Duchet learned the craft of engraver in Venice, where he ran a workshop from 1568 to 1571 under the address In Merzaria alla libreria della nave. The date of Duchet's arrival in Rome is unknown. From 1577, he worked as a publisher, printer and engraver in Rome, in partnership with his nephew Etienne (son of his brother François).

Following Lafréry's death in 1577, his substantial estate, which included a large workshop in the rione Parione of Rome, passed to the Duchets. On 23 July 1577, the estate was formally entrusted to Etienne to administer on behalf of any co-heirs. However, upon returning from a trip to Sicily at the end of November of the same year, Duchet took over management of the assets from Etienne. Etienne continued to live and work with his uncle in Lafréry's former house-workshop.

In 1585, Duchet married Margherita Gherardi, sister of the printer Giacomo Gherardi. He gained a reputation for his maps, as well as his devotional and archaeological prints. His vast output includes works after Bernardino Passeri, with whom he studied, Antonio Tempesta, and Cherubino Alberti. Duchet continued publishing Lafréry's Speculum Romanae Magnificentiae, an album of plans and views of Rome, executed by some of the best engravers in Rome. He replaced lost or divided plates by commissioning new engravings from artists like Ambrogio Brambilla, Nicolas Beatrizet, Enea Vico and Diana Scultori.

Duchet died in Rome on 9 December 1585 and was buried in San Luigi dei Francesi. After his death the workshop first passed to Giovanni Orlandi, then to Hendrik van Schoel, before finally merging with Giovanni Giacomo de Rossi's printing house at the beginning of the 17th century. His pupils included, among others, Philippe Thomassin.

== Bibliography ==
- Fox, Stephen Paul (1992). "DUCHET, Claude". Dizionario Biografico degli Italiani (in Italian). Vol. 41: Donaggio–Dugnani. Rome: Institute of the Italian Encyclopaedia. ISBN 978-88-12-00032-6.
- Jurkowlaniec, Grażyna (2020). "Early Engravings by Giacomo Lauro Published by Claudio Duchetti". Print Quarterly. 37 (1): 3–14. JSTOR 48785928.
- Meurer, Peter H. (2004). The Strabo Illustratus Atlas: A Unique Sixteenth Century Composite Atlas from the House of Bertelli in Venice. Antiquariat Gebr. Haas.
- (in German) Susanne Christine Martin: Duchet, Claude. In: Allgemeines Künstlerlexikon. Die Bildenden Künstler aller Zeiten und Völker (AKL). Band 30, Saur, München u. a. 2001, ISBN 3-598-22770-1, S. 201
