= Jean Rouppert =

French painter

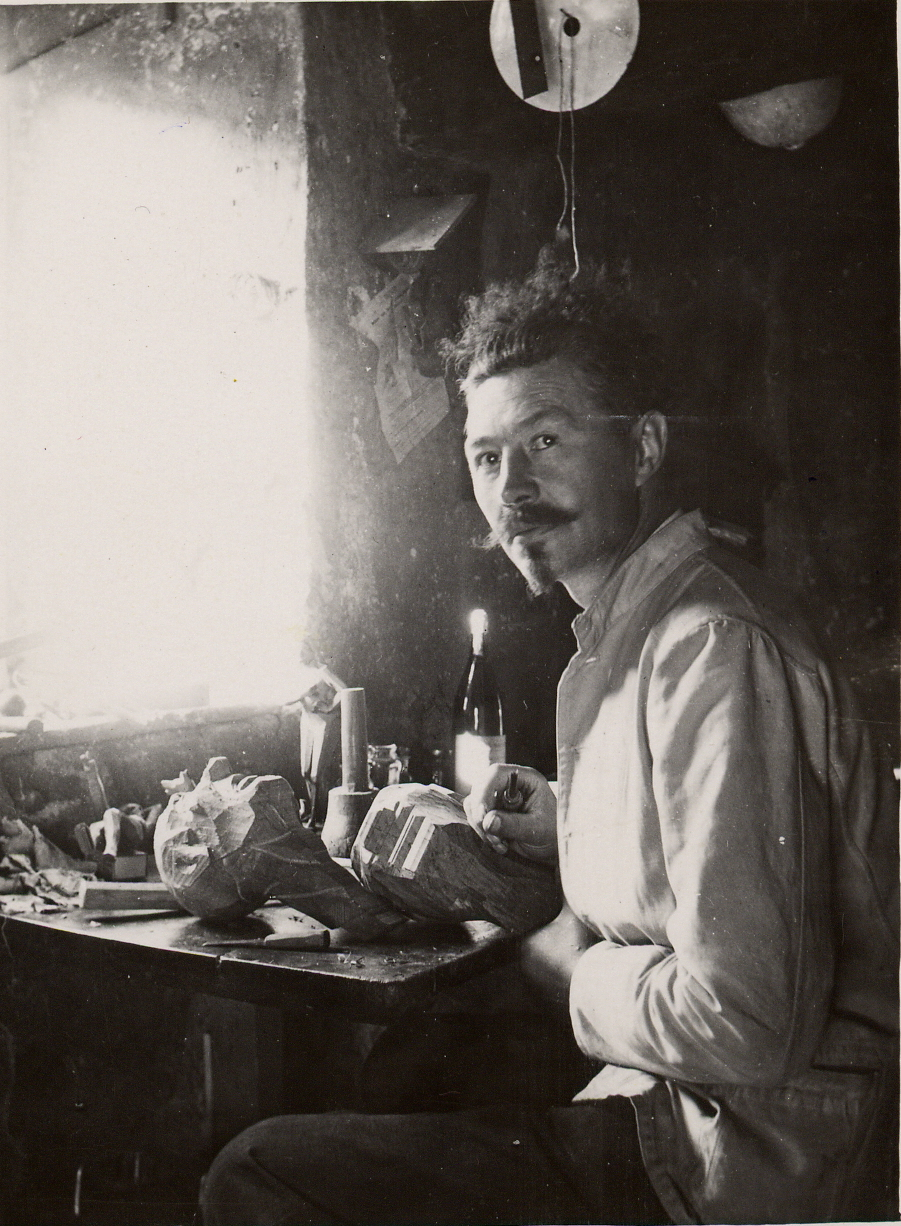
- Jean Rouppert, 1933
- Born: 15 August 1887
- Died: 25 August 1979 (aged 92)
- Occupation: Artist

Jean Rouppert (1887–1979) was a French artist. He was a painter, a caricaturist and a sculptor.

== Biography ==
Jean Rouppert was born on 11 August 1887 in Custines, a town which is situated in the district of Meurthe-et-Moselle. Jean François Rouppert was the son of Johann Rouppert – a metal worker – and of Marie Clémence Kieffer. He lived in Lorraine until 1924 when he moved to the Rhône-Alpes region. He first lived in Lyon and from 1932 onwards he settled in the area of Roanne. Between 1913 and 1924 he was employed as a set painter and then as an art manager for the Emile Gallé institutions in Nancy. Because he was initially a self-taught person, his formation at Gallé obviously left a mark on him. Afterwards he stood out as a protagonist of the Art Deco movement.

The First World War made much of an impact on him as he went through its entire length as a soldier. He made numerous black ink drawings that formed an uncompromising criticism of the war. In 1925 he became an independent artist and he started up a workshop of his own in Lyon which he relocated in Saint-Alban-les-Eaux in 1932. During his lifetime Jean Rouppert expressed himself through drawing mainly, and also through painting. He also developed wood sculpture, mostly from 1934 onwards.

He addressed multiple themes, amongst which are mainly found caricatures and expressive faces, the Great War, naturalistic or imaginary landscapes and wildlife art. He also drew illustrations which depicted a literary or historical theme. Besides, he gave shape to mythological, legendary or religious characters as well as popular figures and he designed Art Deco patterns too.

As a Lorraine inhabitant, Jean Rouppert had been influenced by German art and Lorraine art from the 16th and 17th century (Dürer, Callot) which enhanced his stroke with cogency and accuracy. The influence of Gallé and to a greater extent the Arts and Crafts Movement, the Art Nouveau and Japonisme appear in his works. This influence becomes visible through his ink drawings as much as in his water colours, his gouache works or his sculptures. Jean Rouppert put his art on display during the 1930s, 1940s and the 1950s. He exhibited his works in museums and galleries, including the "Salon de la Société lyonnaise des Beaux-Arts" and the "Salon des Amis des Arts à Roanne".

He died on 25 August 1979 at the age of 91, following his wife by one year. Some retrospective exhibitions have been dedicated to him since 1996 in many "Musées de France".
