= Lafreri atlases =

1570 group of atlases

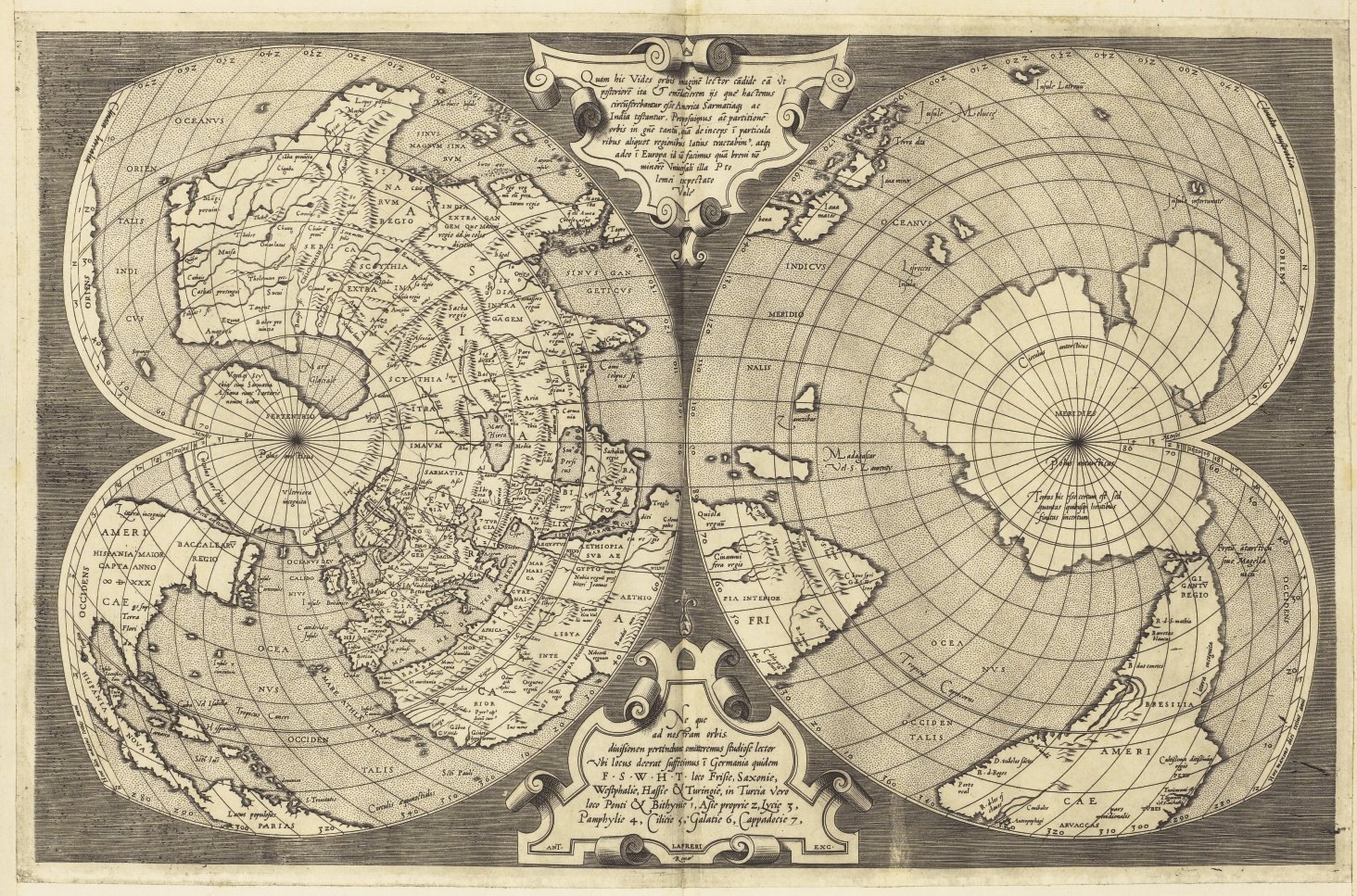
Untitled map of the world on a double cordiform projection from "Lafreri atlas", c. 1564

The cartographic Renaissance of the sixteenth century in Europe was based on a rapid increase in geographical knowledge sourced from exploration and discovery, and the European map of the world "had literally doubled in size within just over a century." Especially in the important trading centers of Rome and Venice, many individual maps were printed in Italy from about 1544. Each publisher worked independently, producing maps based upon his own customers' needs. These maps often varied greatly in size.

Over time, it became common to bind maps together into composite works. Although the word "atlas" was not in use for these composite works until 1570, they now are termed "IATO [Italian, Assembled To Order] atlases" or, more frequently, "Lafreri atlases" (one of the leading publishers of the period, Antonio Lafreri is thought to have been the first to add an engraved title page to a collection of maps – around 1570 or 1572 about the same time as the Theatrum Orbis Terrarum was published in Antwerp.

Each of the atlases was put together from a list of many different available maps, chosen to satisfy the needs or requests of the individual customer; so few if any atlases are identical. About sixty or seventy of these atlases survive today, most held in institutions. The atlases are very important in the history of cartography, for many sixteenth-century Italian maps survive only in these atlases.

Collectors of antique maps value Lafreri atlases, due to their engraving style and scarcity.

== Cartographers of the Lafréri atlases ==
The most notable cartographers involved in publication of the Lafreri maps and atlases include:

- Giacomo Gastaldi – based in Venice; the most important Italian mapmaker of his time
- Battista Agnese – Genoa
- Antonio Lafreri (or Antoine du Pérac Lafréry 1512–77) – Rome; publisher of some of the composite atlases
- Antonio Salamanca – Lafreri's partner
- Giovani Francesco Camocio – Venice
- Donato Bertelli – Venice
- Ferando Bertelli – Venice
- Paolo Forlani – Venice

== See also ==
- Atlas (geography)
