= Philippe Thomassin =

French engraver and publisher

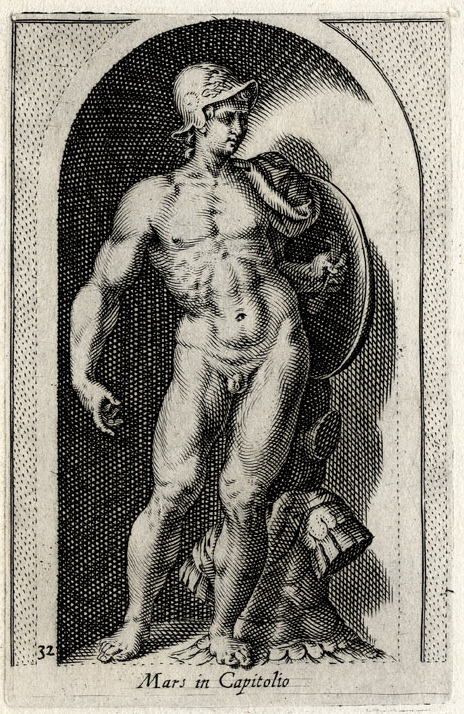
- Philippe Thomassin, Mars in Capitolio from Antiquarum statuarum Urbis Romae liber primus, after 1610, engraving
- Born: Philippe Thomassin; 28 January 1562; Troyes
- Died: 12 May 1622 (aged 60); Rome
- Known for: Printmaking, engraving, publishing

Philippe Thomassin was a French engraver and publisher who emigrated to Rome. He was born in Troyes on 28 January 1562 and died on 12 May 1622 in Rome.

== Early years ==
Born on 28 January 1562, he was one of the twelve children of Jehan Thomassin, a belt-maker, and Nicole Aubry. He was apprenticed to a goldsmith in Troyes in circa 1577.

== Engraver in Rome ==
Philippe Thomassin is first documented in Rome in 1585. He initially worked for the French publishers Claude Duchet (Claudio Duchetti), Lorenzo Vaccari and Marcello Clodio. He subsequently collaborated with Antonio Tempesta on the Vita et miracula Divi Bernardi Clarevalensis Abbatis which was published in 1587.

== Association with Jean Turpin ==
In 1588 Thomassin married Barbara Unge. This marked the beginning of his association with the Parisian painter Jean Turpin, who had married Barbara's sister. Together, their collaborative business activities included acquiring plates and republishing them, copying existing plates by others printmakers, such as those in the possession of Antonio Lafreri and Antonio Salamanca, and producing prints after contemporary paintings by artists including Federico Barocci.

Thomassin was arrested in 1590 by the Holy Office on account of a portrait of the Protestant French king Henry IV of France which he had engraved.

The death of Barbara on 29 June 1601, saw the breakdown of Thomassin's relations with Turpin. A notarial deed dated 19 January 1602 formally dissolved their partnership, with terms that specified that Thomassin was to receive 500 scudi in exchange for giving Turpin a proportion of his share of their business, which, if the share given to Turpin was worth more than 500 scudi, was to be considered a gift from Thomassin. It has been estimated that circa 240 engraved plates passed into Turpin's possession in January 1602: many of these were later to be sold to Callisto Ferrante.

== Post 1602: Thomassin’s associations with Giulio Mancini ==
In the years following the termination of his relations with Turpin, Thomassin rebuilt up a stock of circa 250 engraved plates. These were left in his will to his second wife, Girolama Piscina, whom he married on 3 June 1602 and who, as inventories of the possessions of Girolama and her second husband Francesco Agazzi evince, was in possession of the engraved plates in June 1627. The plates ultimately passed into the possession of the de’ Rossi publishing family. In addition to issuing prints after the work of contemporary artists, Thomassin also engraved plates after artists from the preceding centuries including Raphael, Parmigianino, Francesco Salviati and Giorgio Vasari. The decision to produce prints after these earlier Tuscan and Northern-Italian artists was motivated by Thomassin's involvement with the Sienese art collector and dealer, Giulio Mancini (1559–1630). Mancini was present in Rome from 1592 and Thomassin is referred to in Mancini's correspondence with his brother Deifebo Mancini on 25 September 1609, in reference to a sottocoppa (or metal wine dish) that was to be engraved by Thomassin following a design by Guido Reni. In the following six years, Thomassin continued to issue prints after drawings and paintings in Mancini's collection, including Parmigianino's The Virgin and Child in 1611, Vasari's Immaculate Conception in 1611–12, Zuccari's The Adoration of the Magi in 1613 and Francesco Salviati's The Baptism of Christ in 1615. Jamie Gabarelli has pointed out that the relationship between Thomassin and Mancini was one based not only on a professional interaction but also one based on reciprocal favours, and the resulting engravings represent the earliest group of engravings to be based on works owned or handled by a single collector.

Between 1608 and 1611/1612 Jacques Callot was present in Thomassin's workshop, where he was tasked with engraving prints after well known paintings: a commercial practice which offered a steady source of income.

== Bibliography ==
- Bruwaert, Edmond, La vie et les œuvres de Philippe Thomassin, graveur Troyen 1562–1622, Troyes, 1914.
- Bury, Michael (2001). The Print in Italy 1550–1620. London: British Museum Press.
- Gabarelli, Jamie, ‘Philippe Thomassin and Giulio Mancini’s Art Collection’, Print Quarterly, XXXII, December 2015, pp. 379–94.
- Grivel, Marianne (1996). "Thomassin". In Turner, Jane (ed.). The Dictionary of Art. 30. New York: Grove's Dictionaries. p. 746. ISBN 1-884446-00-0. OCLC 1033647127 — via the Internet Archive.
- Pagani, Valeria, ‘Philippe Thomassin’s engraved plates after 1602’, Print Quarterly, XXXIII, September 2016, pp. 251–62.
