= Giacomo Lauro (engraver) =

Flemish born Italian engraver

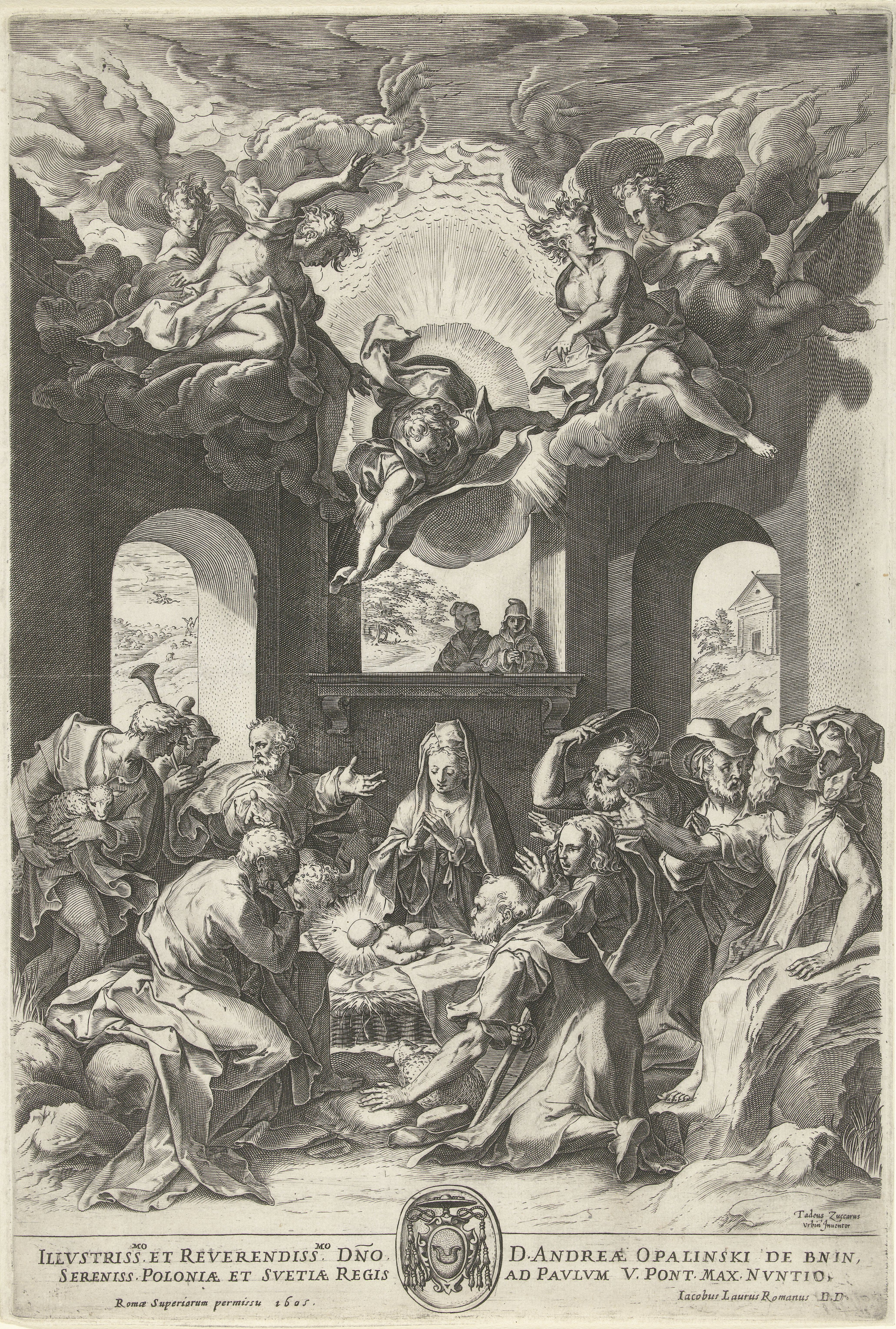
Giacomo Lauro, Adoration by the shepherds, 1605, Rijksmuseum, Amsterdam

Giacomo Lauro was an Italian engraver of Flemish origin working in Rome between 1584 and 1645.

== Biography ==
Born in Antwerp to a family of engravers, Giacomo Lauro was active in Rome between 1583 and 1645. At first he partnered with Claude Duchet (inheritor of the prominent Antonio Lafreri print workshop), publishing religious and mythological plates such as the Martyrdom of St. Catherine (1582) and the Stoning of St. Stephen (1584). He established his own workshop around 1590. He specialised in bird's-eye views of Italian cities, particularly Rome. Among his earlier works is a widely disseminated map of Christian Rome (1599) with the seven principal basilicas engraved after Antonio Tempesta. In 1639 Lauro published a small quarto booklets of 37 Italian and international city views with the title Heroico splendore delle città del mondo.

Lauro acquired and restored old plates and published copies of classic prints as Marcantonio Raimondi's St. Paul Preaching in Athens. He collaborated closely with the painter Antonio Tempesta. He acted as a major publisher for Tempesta's designs, printing numerous plates of his battles, landscapes, and allegorical scenes directly from original copperplates, as well as executing close workshop copies for broader distribution.

Following the death of the Dutch artist Cornelis Cort in 1578, Lauro was among the prominent Roman print publishers who acquired historical copperplates from the late Flemish master's stock. He regularized, retouched, and reissued these older sixteenth-century masterworks to meet the continuous demand for Cort's plates. Lauro also acquired plates from Jacob Matham which he published in 1598.

Today Lauro is best known for his monumental antiquarian work Antiquae Urbis Splendor (first published in three parts dated 1612–1615), which featured detailed copper-plate engravings and architectural reconstructions of ancient Roman monuments, temples, and theaters. The work was reissued several times, some accompanied by further views of churches, palaces and gardens of Rome.

== Gallery ==
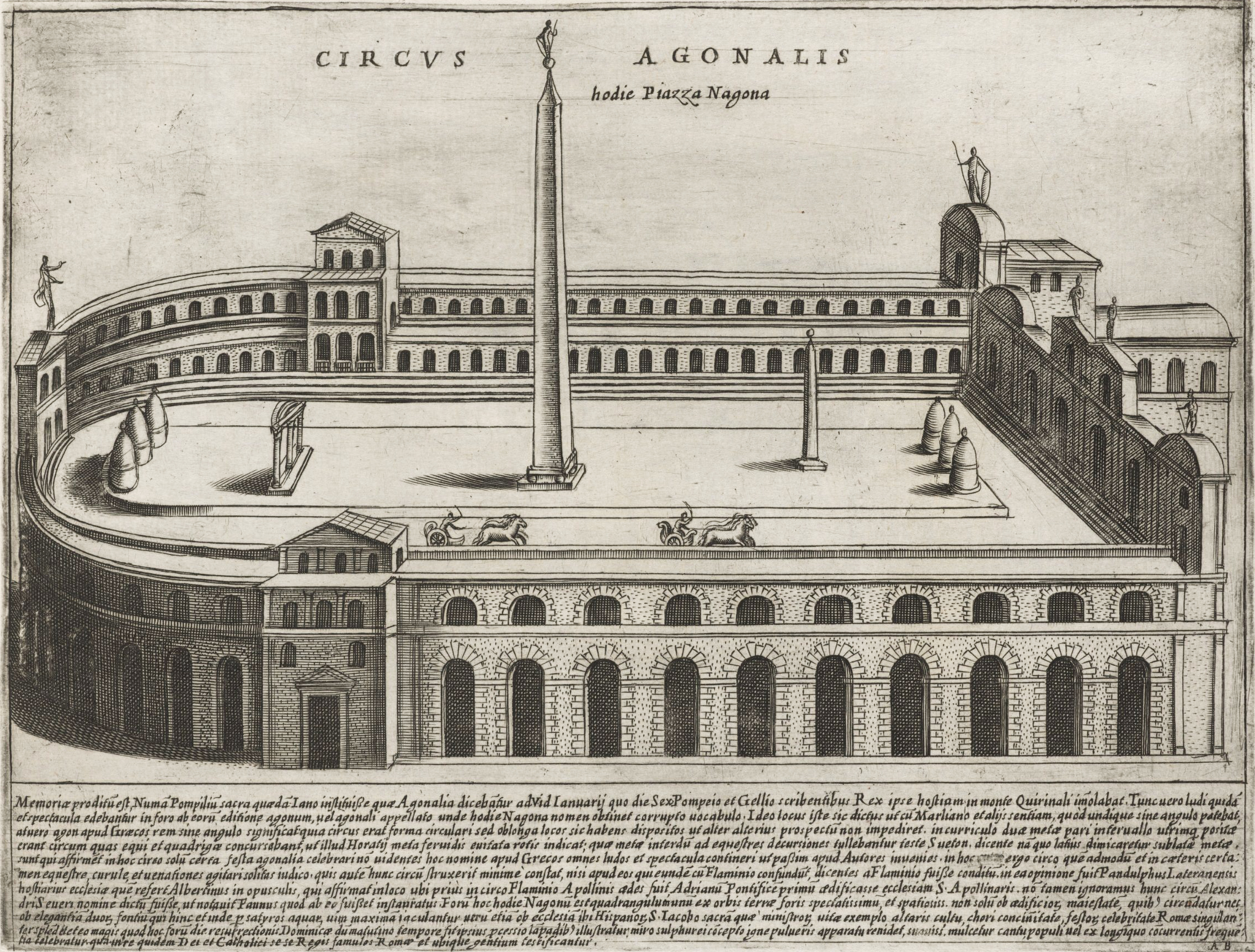
Circus Agonalis, from Antiquae urbis splendor, 1610, Houghton Library, Harvard University

The Porticus Octaviae, from Antiquae urbis splendor, 1638, Rijksmuseum, Amsterdam

Villa Farnese in Caprarola. for Palazzi diversi nel'alma cità di Roma, 1638, Rijksmuseum, Amsterdam

Temple of Janus in the Roman Forum from Splendore dell'antica e moderna Roma, 1641, National Library of Poland, Warsaw

== Sources ==
- Jurkowlaniec, Grażyna (2020). "Early Engravings by Giacomo Lauro Published by Claudio Duchetti". Print Quarterly. 37 (1): 3–14. JSTOR 48785928.
- Marshall, Amy (2002). Mirabilia Urbis Romae. Five Centuries of Guidebooks and Views. Toronto: Coach House Printing. ISBN 9780772760395.
- Di Calisto, Laura (2005). "LAURO, Giacomo". Dizionario Biografico degli Italiani (in Italian). Vol. 64: Latilla–Levi Montalcini. Rome: Institute of the Italian Encyclopaedia. ISBN 978-88-12-00032-6.
