= Cucurucu =

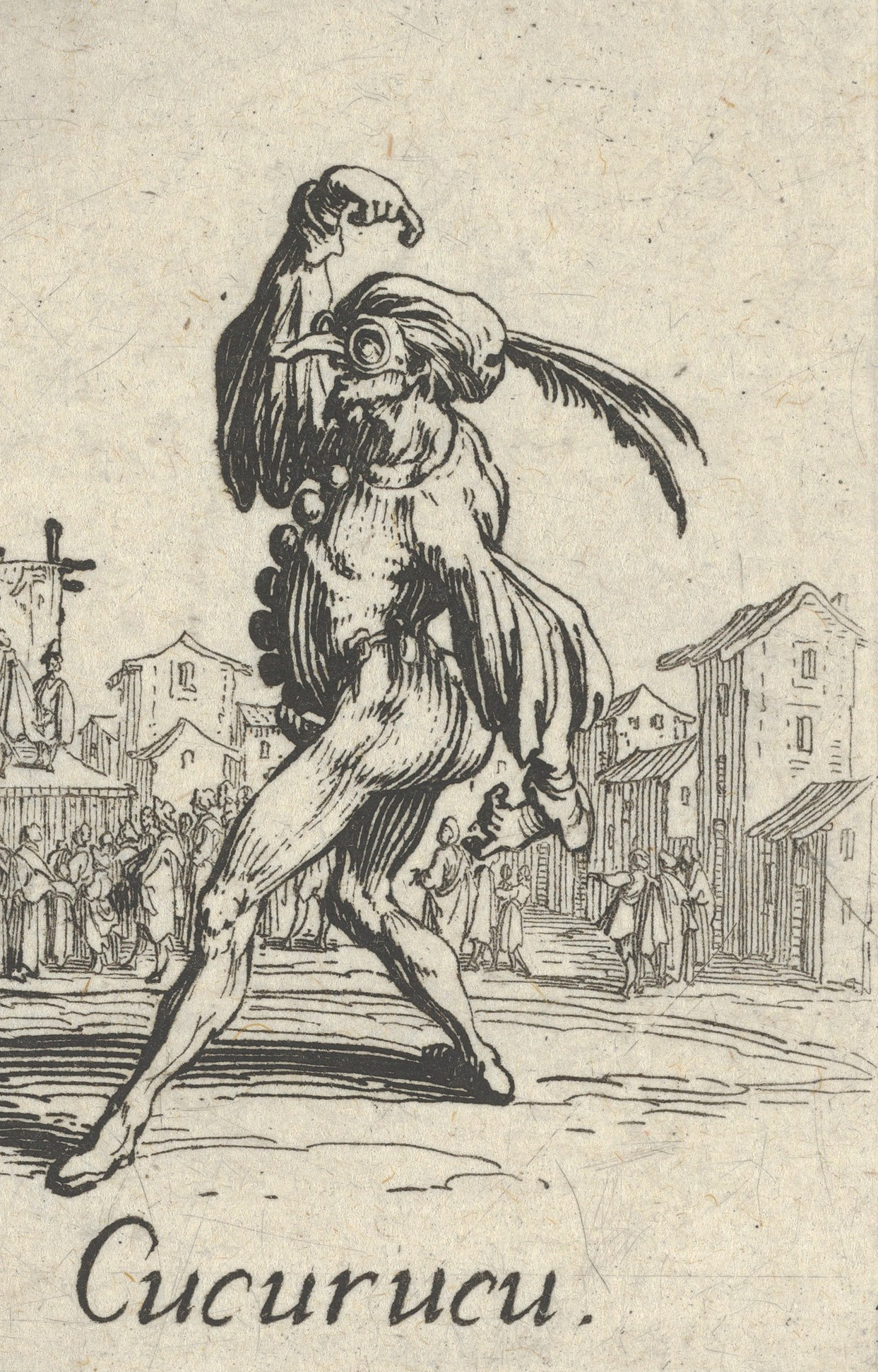
Cucurucu in a 17th-century etching by Jacques Callot

Cucurucu is the brother of Pulcinella, and a zanni character in commedia dell'arte. Like Pulcinella, Cucurucu's name is probably derived from a bird noise.

He figures in the comic madrigal "Chichilichichì Cucurucù," attributed to Giovanni Domenico da Nola, and the madrigal "Chi Chi Li Chi" by Andrea Gabrieli, along with Lucia and Martina. A sketch by Jacques Callot shows him with another zanni, Razullo.
