= Ambrogio Brambilla =

Italian painter

- Caricatures of the Olympian Gods, 1580s, Uffizi, Florence
- Born: mid-1500s Milan, Duchy of Milan
- Died: c. 1599; Rome, Papal States
- Occupations: Engraver; Cartographer
- Years active: 1579–1599
- Movement: Mannerism

Ambrogio Brambilla (active 1579 – 1599) was an Italian engraver and cartographer, mainly active in Rome.

== Biography ==
Ambrogio Brambilla was born in Milan in the mid-1500s. In his youth, he was a member of the Milanese Accademia della Val di Blenio, founded by the Mannerist painter Gian Paolo Lomazzo and dedicated to rustic, grotesque and carnival-style poetry written in the Lombard language. Brambilla participated in the academy not only as a painter and printmaker, but also as a poet, and some of his poems (written under the pseudonym 'Compà Borgnin') were published in an anthology of Milanese dialect verse by members of the Academy (1589).

Brambilla left Milan in the late 1570s, and by 1579 he had become a member of the Congregazione dei Virtuosi al Pantheon – a guild of Roman artists. He remained in Rome until at least 1599, the date of his last known work. In 1582 he produced a series of 135 small engravings of the emperors from Julius Caesar to Rudolf II and in 1585, another series, of the popes up to Sixtus V. His most successful works, however, were prints of scenographic reconstructions of ancient buildings such as the Septizodium (1582) and Vedute of ancient and modern Rome, for example, the Cortile del Belvedere (1579), the Tomb of Pope Julius II by Michelangelo, and the Girandola di fuochi artificiali a Castel Sant'Angelo (Fireworks Display at Castel Sant'Angelo, 1579).

Many of his prints depicting ancient monuments, produced after 1577, were included in the volume titled Speculum Romanae Magnificentiae (The Mirror of Roman Magnificence) produced a la carte for buyers interested in views of the monuments of Rome, and published by the printing press of Antonio Salamanca and Antonio Lafreri.

Brambilla also produced prints depicting popular games and street scenes. In 1589 he engraved the Last Judgement after a relief sculpture in wax on slate by Giacomo Vivio based on Michelangelo's frescoes in the Sistine Chapel. Two unpublished engravings depict a Perspective Map of Ancona (1585) and a View of the Catafalque for the Funeral of Cardinal Alessandro Farnese (1589; both Milan, Sforza Castle). Later sources record Brambilla's activity as a sculptor in bronze, painter and architect. While he is best known for his engravings of antiquities, he also produced grotesque caricatures in the Leonardesque tradition.

== Gallery ==
Section and elevation of the Colosseum in Rome, 1581, Metropolitan Museum of Art, New York

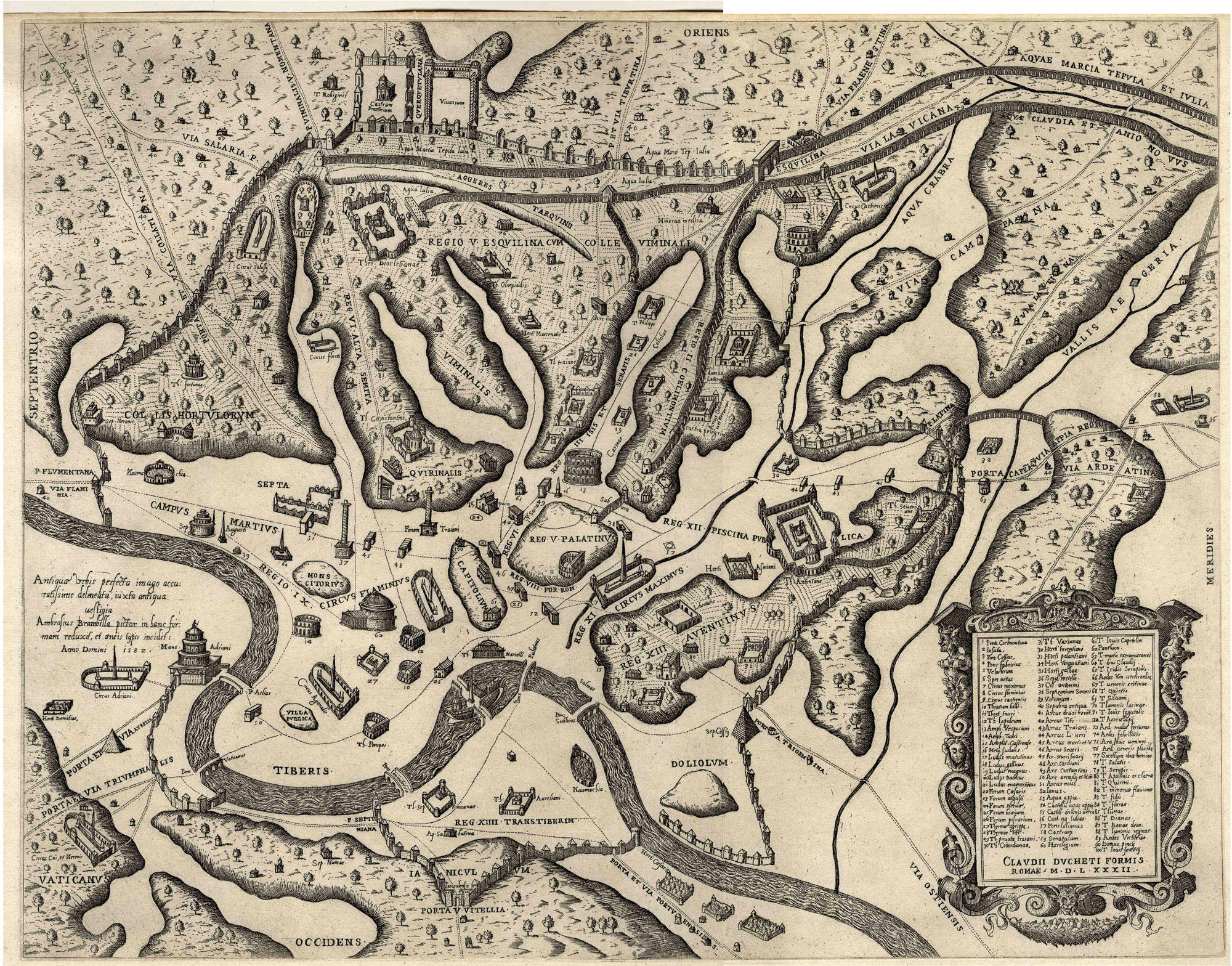
Map of Ancient Rome, 1582, Salzburg University Library

The Tiberine island, 1582, Yale Center for British Art, New Haven, Connecticut

The Pantheon, 1581-1586, Yale Center for British Art, New Haven, Connecticut

The Pyramid of Caestius, 1602, Yale Center for British Art, New Haven, Connecticut

Fireworks Display at Castel Sant'Angelo, 1579, Metropolitan Museum of Art, New York

A Papal Gathering in the Sistine Chapel, 1582, Metropolitan Museum of Art, New York

Villa d'Este and its Gardens, 1581, Metropolitan Museum of Art, New York

== Bibliography ==
- Alberici, Clelia (1971). "Brambilla, Ambrogio". Dizionario Biografico degli Italiani (in Italian). Vol. 13: Borremans–Brancazolo. Rome: Institute of the Italian Encyclopaedia. ISBN 978-88-12-00032-6.
- Katritzky, M.A. (2006). The Art of Commedia: A Study in the Commedia Dell'Arte 1560-1620 with Special Reference to the Visual Records. Amsterdam-New York: Rodopi. pp. 114–117. ISBN 978-9042017986.
