= Razullo =

Zanni figure in commedia dell'arte theatre

Razullo is a zanni figure in commedia dell'arte theatre. A sketch by Jacques Callot shows him with Cucurucu.
