= Theseus Rediscovering His Father's Sword =

Painting by Nicolas Poussin

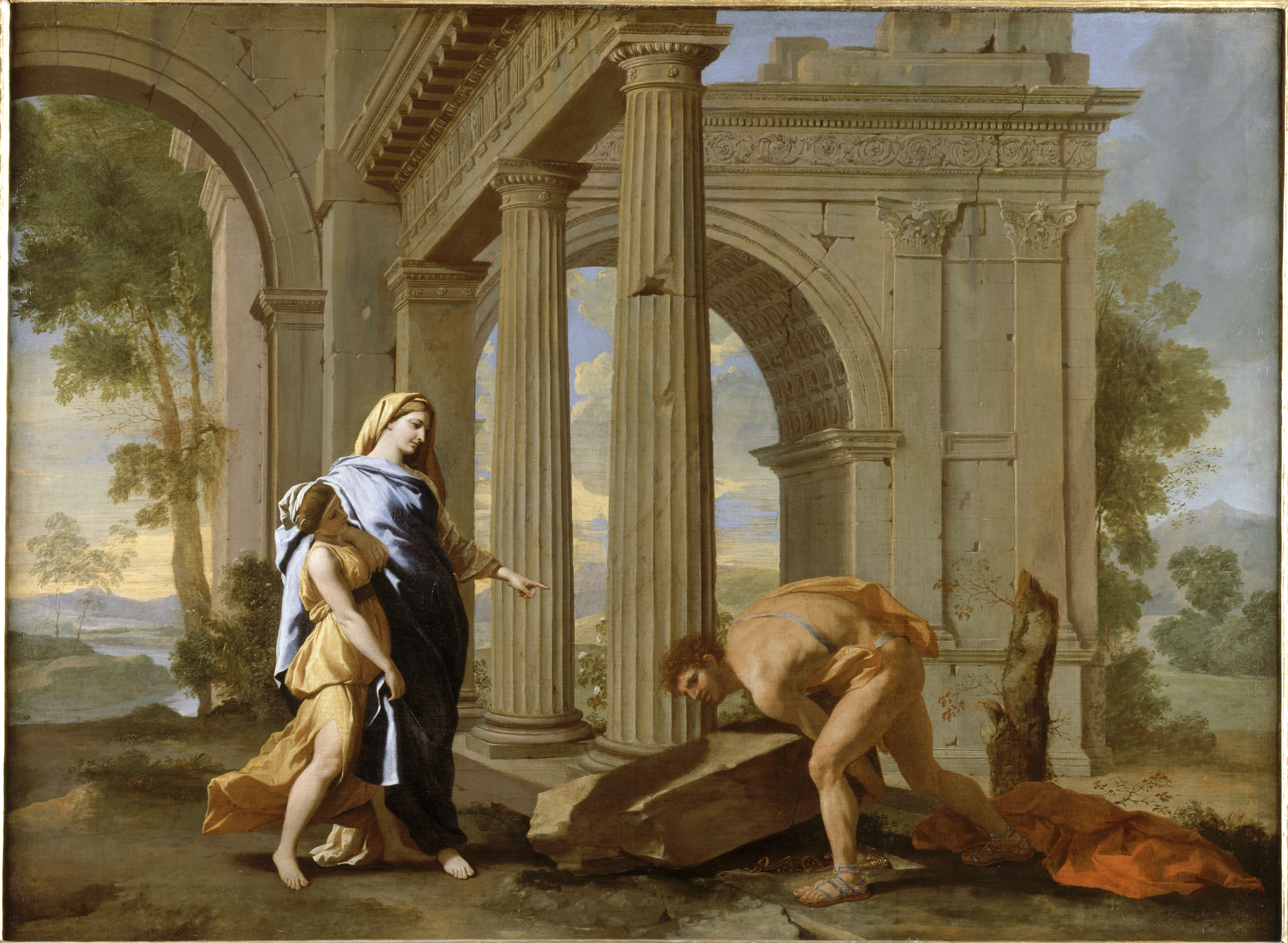
- Artist: Nicolas Poussin and Jean Lemaire
- Year: c.1638
- Medium: oil on canvas
- Dimensions: 98 cm × 134 cm (39 in × 53 in)
- Location: Musée Condé, Chantilly

Theseus Rediscovering His Father's Sword is a c.1638 painting by Nicolas Poussin and Jean Lemaire, acquired in London by Henri d'Orléans, Duke of Aumale in 1860, moved to his château de Chantilly in 1871 and now in the Musée Condé at Chantilly. The Uffizi (inv. 1004) and the Wildenstein collection hold autograph copies of the work, but X-ray examination has shown much retouching of the Chantilly version and so it is accepted as the original of the composition.

Such collaborations were common - in the 1630s Poussin only produced small private commissions, with foreground figures in his own hand and background architecture by a specialist painter such as Lemaire. The first record of the painting dates to the 19th century, when it was in the United Kingdom, passing through the hands of John Knight, Higginson and Nieuwenhuis before being acquired by the Duke of Aumale.

It shows a scene from Plutarch's Life of Theseus. Theseus's mother Aethra and Theseus himself were both born in Troezen. She had had sex with both Poseidon and the mortal Aegeus, king of Athens, in Troezen on the same night. Before leaving her in Troezen to return to Athens, Aegeus left his sandals and sword under a heavy boulder and instructed that - if Aethra's son could lift the boulder and recover the items under it - he must come to Athens to meet his father. Theseus later managed to do so without effort, as shown in the painting.

== See also ==
- List of paintings by Nicolas Poussin
