= Nicolas Beatrizet =

French engraver

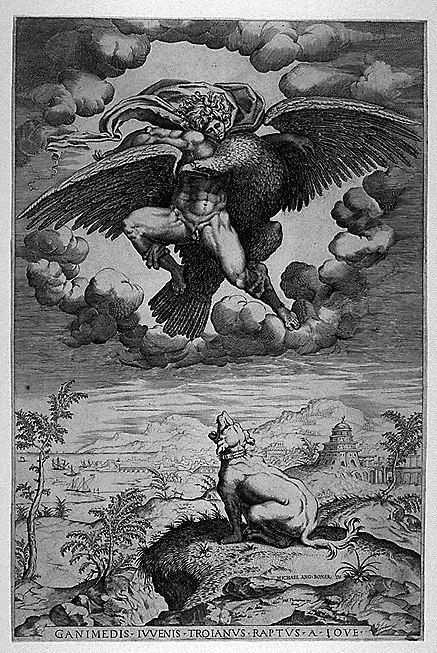
Ganymede, after Michelangelo.

Nicolas Béatrizet (or Beatrizet, or Beatricetto) was a 16th century French engraver, working in Rome.

== Life ==
Béatrizet was born at Luneville in or before 1520. From his style, it has been conjectured that he was a scholar of Ghisi and Agostino Veneziano de Musis. From 1540 to 1560, he engraved under the direction of Michelangelo. He died at Rome after 1560.

Joseph Strutt believed that the importance of Béatrizet's works lay rather in the fact that his engravings were unique records of pictures by some of the greatest artists rather than their inherent quality. He wrote that "they seem to want any requisite, that a fine engraving ought to possess, namely, drawing, character, effect, and mechanical execution".

== Works ==
He usually signed his plates with the letters "N. B. L. F.". Their number is considerable, but most of them are included in the following list:

=== Portraits ===
- Bust of Pius III.
- Pope Paul III, an oval.
- Pope Paul IV; dated 1558.
- Henry II, King of France; N. B. F. Lot.f. 1558.
- Another Portrait of Henry II; dated 1556.
- Hippolita Gonzaga.
- Juan Valverdus, Spaniard.
- Antoine Salamanca, engraver, publisher and dealer in prints.
- Don Juan of Austria, an oval, on a monument; inscribed "Generate della Legha".
- The Genealogy of the first twelve Emperors and Empresses, with their Portraits, from medals; two sheets.*The Kings of Poland, in medallions; inscribed "Reges Polonia".

=== Religious subjects ===
- Cain killing Abel; inscribed "Fratricida Abelis, A. S. ex. 1540".
- Joseph explaining the Dream; after Raphael; marked N. B. F., and his name; one of his best plates.
- The Nativity of the Virgin; after Baccio Bandinelli; inscribed "Nicolaus Beatricius restituit et formis suis exc".
- The Annunciation; with the names of Michelangelo and Beatrici.
- The Adoration of the Magi; after Parmigiano, "N.B.L.F".
- The Holy Family, with St. John; "Jerom. Mutian. pinx., Nicolaus Beatricius Lotaringus incidit, &c".
- The Good Samaritan; Michelangelo, inv.
- Christ on the Mount of Olives: after Titian; marked "N. B. F."
- The Crucifixion, with the Virgin, Magdalene, and St. John; with the Sun and Moon on each side; "Mucianus Brixianus, inv., Nicolaus Beatricius, &c. exe".
- The Mater Dolorosa; after Michelangelo; "N. B. Romae. 1547."
- The taking down from the Cross; after Circignani; marked "B. Romae".
- Christ delivering the Souls from Purgatory; with the names of Raphael and Beatrici.
- The Ascension; after Raphael, with his cipher. 1541.
- The Conversion of St. Paul; "Michelangelo, pinx., &c."; marked "N. B."
- St. Michael overcoming the Evil Spirit; after Raphael; marked "N. B. L."
- The Virgin seated on a Throne, distributing Rosaries; inscribed Nicolaus Beatricius, S;c. exe., oval.
- The Cross worshipped all over the world; arched plate, marked "N. B. F.", and inscribed "Crux illustris, &c. MDLVII".
- The prophet Jeremiah; after Michelangelo.
- St. Jerome kneeling before a Crucifix; after Titian; marked "N. B. L. F."
- St. Elizabeth, Queen of Hungary, relieving the distressed; after Mutiano.
- The Last Judgment; after Michelangelo. Dated 1562. In nine sheets.

=== Secular and mythological subjects ===
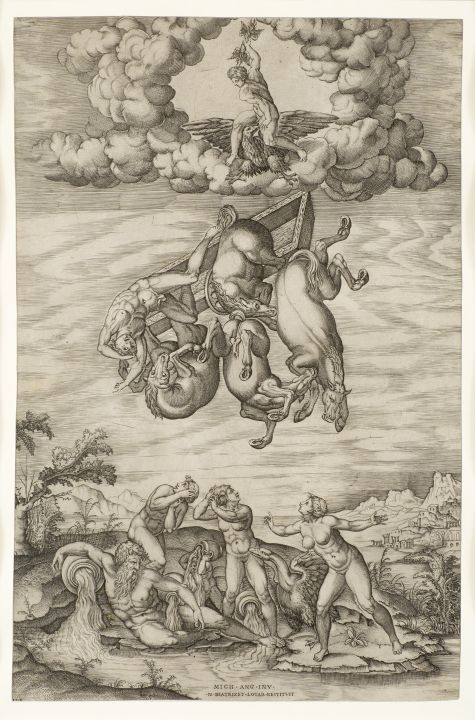
The fall of Phaeton, after Michelangelo, ca. 1542.

- The Sacrifice of Iphigenia; on the altar is inscribed "Iphigenia"; it is marked "N. B. L. F."
- Ganymede; after Michelangelo; inscribed "Ganimedes juvenis, &c". (pictured)
- The Fall of Phaeton; after Michelangelo; retouched by Beatrici. (pictured)
- Tityus devoured by a Vulture; after the same; "Ant. Salamancha, ex."
- Silenus carried by Children; after the same; "N. Beatrice, fec".
- The Dream of Human Life, emblematical subject; after the same.
- Shooting at a Target; after the same.
- Vertumnus and Pomona; after Pontormo.
- Reason combating Love; after B. Bandinelli; with his cipher.
- A Combat between five Men and five Wild Beasts; after Giulio Romano. 1532.
- The Battle of the Amazons; after a basso-rilievo; inscribed "Amazonum pugna, &c. 1559".
- The Battle of the Dacii; after the basso-rilievo of the Arch of Constantine; marked "N. B." and inscribed "Tabula Marmora, &c."
- The Emperor Trajan triumphant; after a basso-rilievo. 1560.
- The Pantheon of M. Agrippa; marked "N. B. F."
- The Temple of Fortune; after a drawing by Raphael; marked "N. B. F."
- The great Circus; marked "N. Beatrizet Lotaringiae"; two sheets.
- The Front of the Farnese Palace; after the design of Michelangelo. 1548.
- Statue of Moses; after Michelangelo; inscribed "Moysis ingens, &c".
- Statue of Jesus Christ; after Michelangelo; with his name.
- Equestrian Statue of M. Aurelius. 1558.
- Statue of a Philosopher reading; inscribed "Anaximenes, &c.": the plate was afterwards retouched, and the Philosopher changed into St. Paul.
- The Castle of St. Angelo.
- The Siege and Taking of Luneville; "Nic. Beatrizet Lotaringas, incidet. 1558."
