= Jean Lemaire (painter) =

French painter

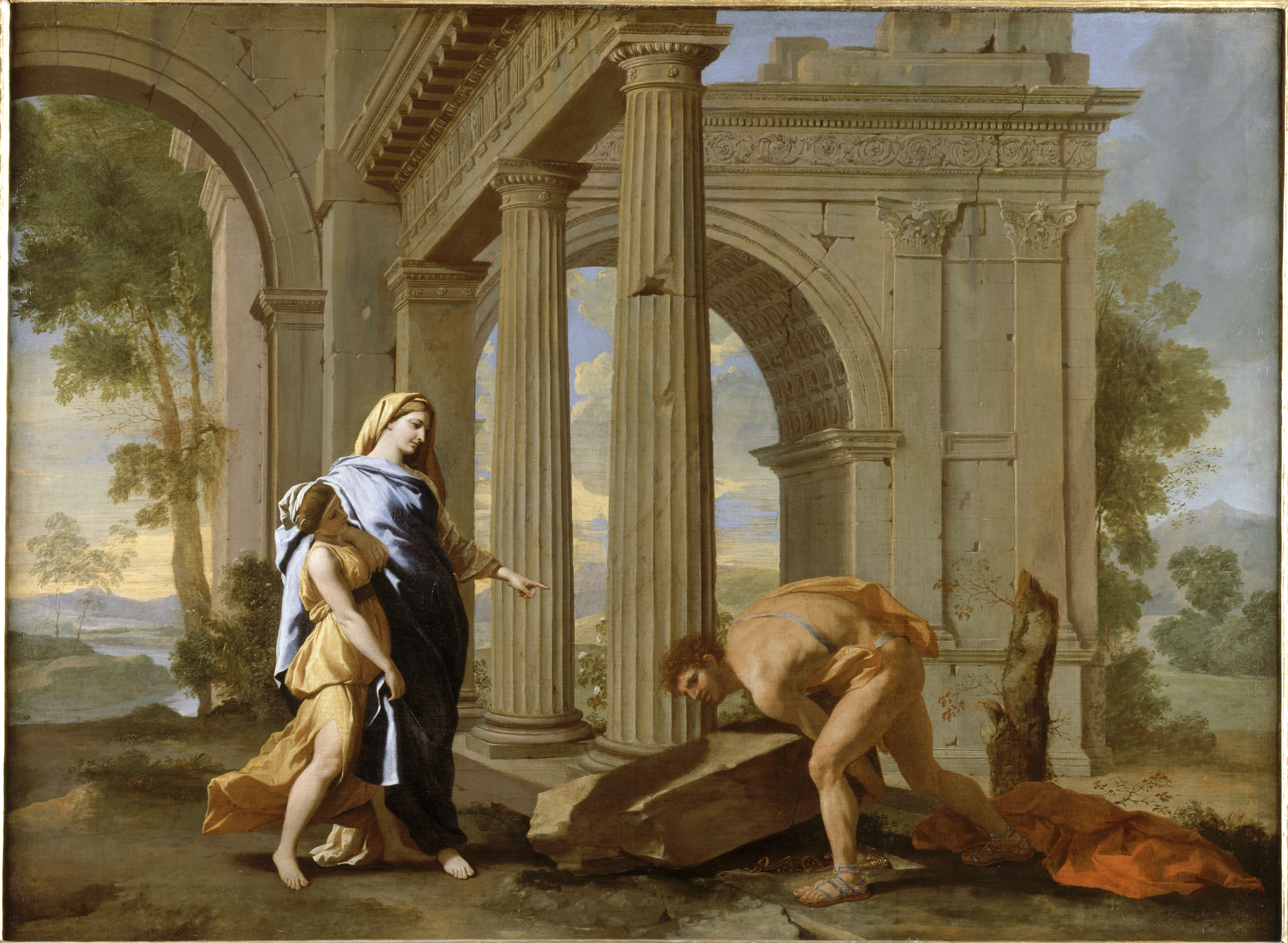
Theseus Rediscovering His Father's Sword, c. 1636–1637. Figures by Poussin, architecture by Lemaire.

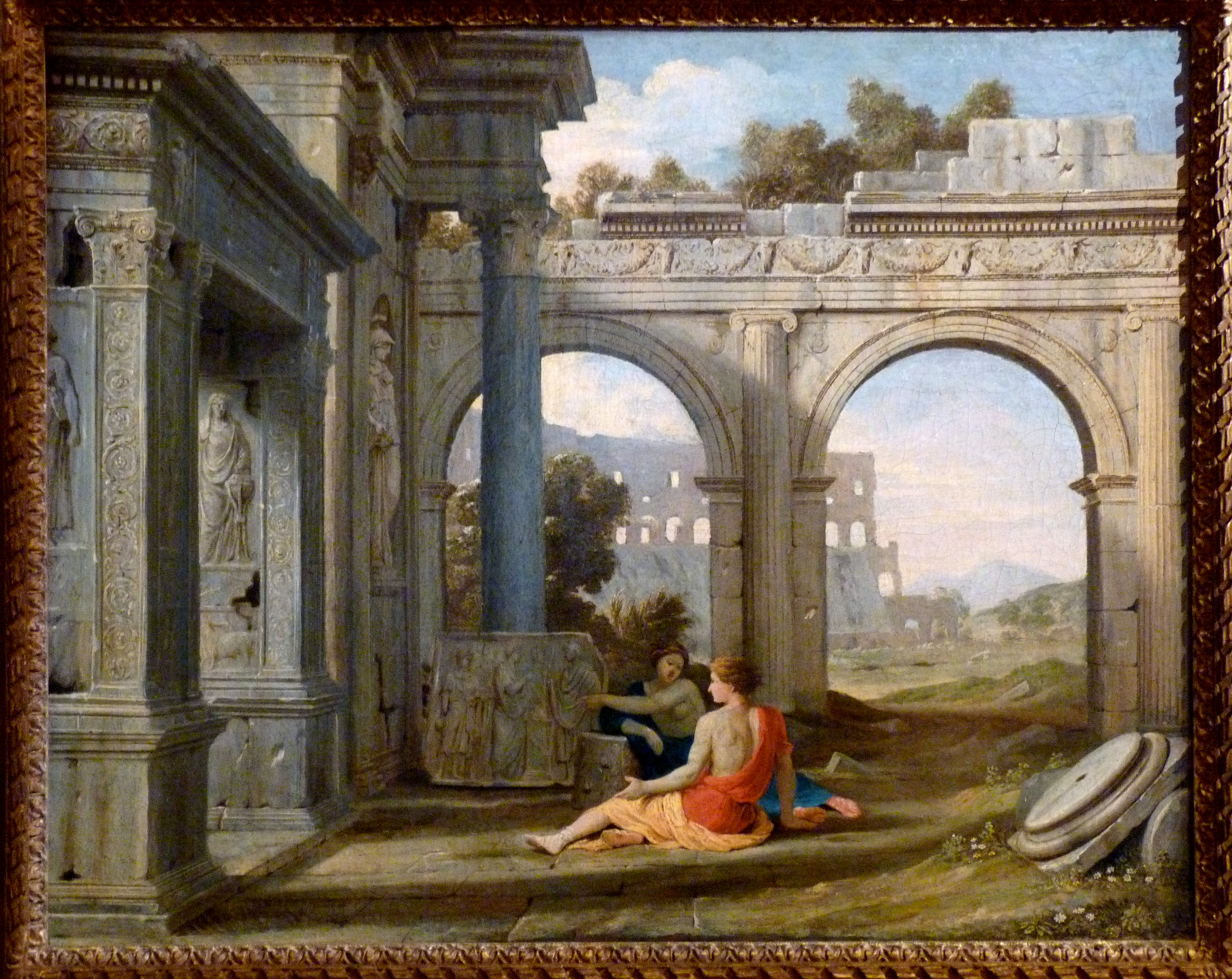
Figures in a landscape of classical ruins, c. 1639, Georges de Lastic collection.

Jean Lemaire (1598–1659) was a French painter. He is also known as Lemaire-Poussin, due to his frequent close collaborations with Nicolas Poussin. He specialised in landscapes and classical architectural scenes, populated with mythological figures in classical dress.

== Life ==
Lemaire was born in Dammartin-en-Goële. He studied under Claude Vignon before moving to Rome, where there is evidence for his presence dated to 1613. It was there he became linked with Poussin, who arrived in Rome in 1624. Around 1636 Lemaire took part in the decorative scheme commissioned by Philip IV of Spain for his Buen Retiro palace - Lemaire proposed a scholarly architectural classical landscape. He returned to Paris in 1639 and re-allied with Poussin in 1640, becoming his main assistant in the decorative scheme in the Grande Galerie of the Louvre. He travelled to Italy again in 1642 before settling back in France for good. He was made guardian of the king's paintings at the Louvre and the Tuileries, at the suggestion of François Sublet de Noyers. He died in Gaillon.

== Sources ==
- "Artists Sketching among Antique Ruins". Victoria and Albert Museum.
- "Classical Ruins in a Landscape". Royal Collection Trust.
- Anthony Blunt, 'Jean Lemaire: Painter of Architectural Fantasies' (The Burlington Magazine for Connoisseurs: Vol. 83, No. 487 (Oct., 1943), pp. 236 and 240-246
