= Juan Valverde de Amusco =

Spanish anatomist

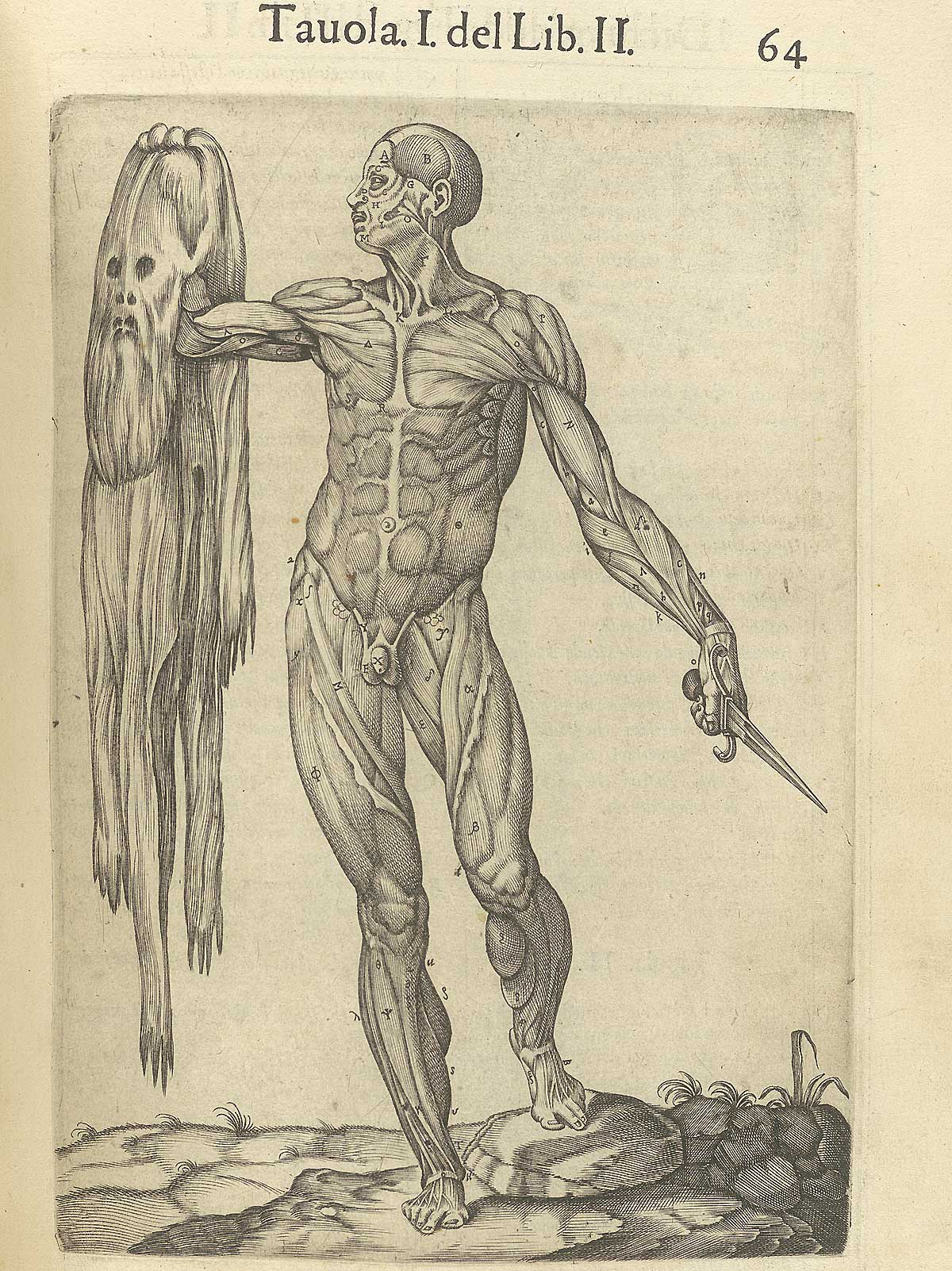
Juan Valverde de Amusco's Historia de la composicion del cuerpo humano (Rome, 1560).

Juan Valverde de Amusco (or "de Hamusco") (c. 1525-?) was born in the Crown of Castille in what is now Spain c. 1525 and studied medicine in Padua and Rome under Realdo Columbo and Bartolomeo Eustachi. He published several works on anatomy, including De animi et corporis sanitate tuenda libellus (Paris, 1552).

Valverde's most famous work was Historia de la composicion del cuerpo humano, first published in Rome, 1556. All but four of its 42 engraved copperplate illustrations were taken almost directly from Andreas Vesalius's De humani corporis fabrica. Vesalius bitterly commented on Valverde's plagiarism, accusing him of having performed very few dissections himself. Occasionally, however, Valverde corrected Vesalius' images, as in his depictions of the muscles of the eyes, nose, and larynx. One of Valverde's most striking original plates is that of a muscle figure holding his own skin in one hand and a knife in the other, which has been likened to Saint Bartholomew in The Last Judgment (Michelangelo) of the Sistine Chapel.

The original illustrations were most likely drawn by Gaspar Becerra (1520–1570), a contemporary of Michelangelo, and the copperplate engravings are thought to have been carried out by Nicolas Beatrizet (1507?-1570?), whose initials "NB" appear on several of the plates.

== Sources ==
- Adapted from public domain text at Juan Valverde de Amusco Biography. Historical Anatomies on the Web. US National Library of Medicine.
