= Antonio Salamanca =

Spanish-born Italian engraver and publisher

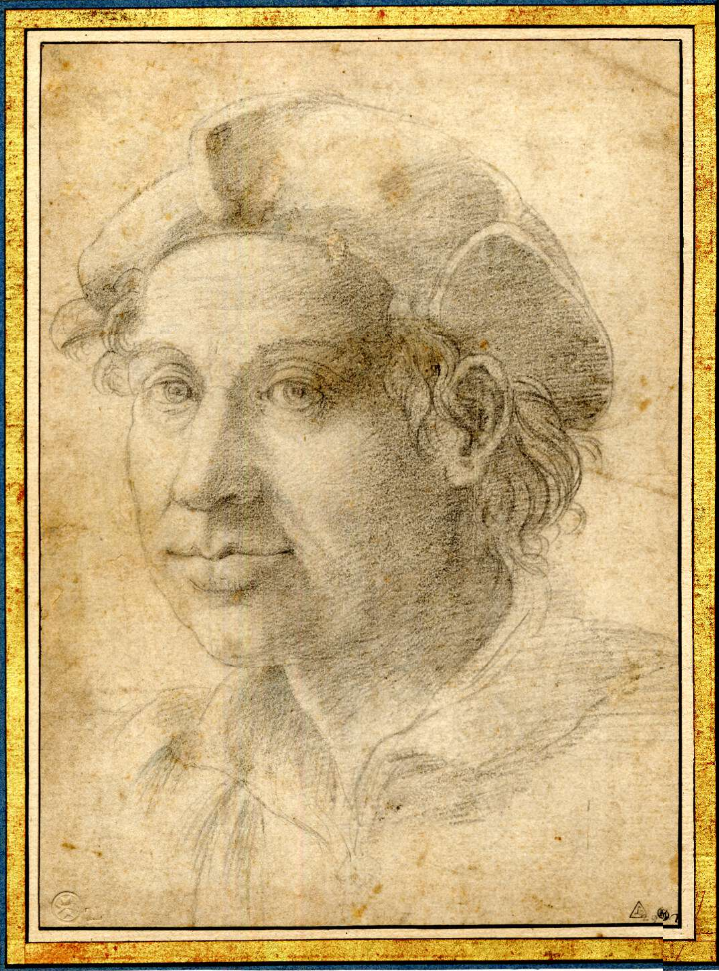
- Sebastiano del Piombo, Portrait of Antonio Salamanca, British Museum, London
- Born: Antonio Martínez; 4 April 1478; Salamanca, Spain
- Died: 11 July 1562 (aged 84); Rome, Papal States
- Other name: Antonio Martínez de Salamanca
- Occupations: Publisher, book-seller and engraver
- Years active: 1517–1562
- Children: Francesco Salamanca

Antonio Salamanca or Martínez de Salamanca (4 April 1478 – 11 July 1562) was a Spanish-born Italian dealer and publisher who settled in Rome and was active as a book-seller, publisher and engraver.

== Biographe ==
=== Early life ===
Antonio Martínez was born in Salamanca, Spain on 4 April 1478. Little is known about his youth and family.The only source providing biographical details is an 18th-century transcription of the inscription on his tombstone, which was formerly located in the Roman church of San Lorenzo in Damaso but is now lost.

He probably moved to Rome around 1505. In the petition he submitted to the Roman Conservators to obtain honorary citizenship, granted on 29 May 1560, he stated that he had been a resident of the city for fifty-five years. The same documents also note that he descended 'from a noble family of Salamanca'.

Nothing is known about his life prior to that time. The only indication of a possible stay in Milan comes from a note in an essay by Franz Ehrle. Ehrle claimed that Salamanca came from Milan, but he did not provide any supporting evidence. This assertion has since been repeated in much of the subsequent literature.

Around 1510, Salamanca married a young Roman woman named Sigismonda Viccarda (1494–1557), with whom he had at least three children: Maddalena, Francesco and Emilia. A recently discovered marriage contract dates their wedding in 1532. However, his daughter, Magdalena, was born prior to this date. Since she is explicitly named as his legitimate child in her own marriage certificate, it can be concluded that Salamanca had a previous, unidentified wife as well.

=== Career ===
Salamanca is first mentioned as a 'bookseller' in the 1517 census – the earliest documentary evidence of his presence in Rome. He lived in the Parione district, within the parish of San Lorenzo in Damaso. In 1519, he requested and obtained a papal privilege for his first publication: six books from the Amadís de Gaula a Spanish chivalric romance, edited and partly written by Garci Rodríguez de Montalvo. The first four volumes (Amadís de Gaula: Los Cuatro Libros) appeared that same year, followed in 1525 by Las Sergas del Virtuoso Cavallero Esplandián, published in partnership with the Florentine printer Giacomo Giunta.

As the only Spanish printer active in Rome during the sixteenth century, Salamanca primarily published texts in the Castilian language for his fellow countrymen living in the city. Around 1520, he published an edition of Fernando de Rojas' tragicomedy La Celestina, followed in 1531 by Antonio de Guevara's Libro aureo de Marco Aurelio emperador y eloquentissimo orador. He also published liturgical texts by Spanish authors, including Spechio vulgare per li sacerdoti by Francisco Delicado (1525), the Breviarium by Cardinal Francisco de Quiñones (1535), and Missae by Cristóbal de Morales (1544).

In 1532 Salamanca published his first collection of engravings with prints of mythological interest, including works by Raphael. During the 1540s, Salamanca increasingly invested in the production of printed images, releasing an average of three to four new works per year. He focused on large-format prints of archaeological, religious and mythological subjects, portraits, and early cartographic works. Among his works from this period is an early copy of Gerardus Mercator's first world map.

Salamanca employed several prominent engravers in his workshop, including Nicolas Beatrizet, Enea Vico, and Giulio Bonasone. Since 1553, he cooperated with Antonio Lafreri (1512–1577), a publisher and map trader of French origin, with whom he published a book of Juan Valverde de Amusco illustrated by Beatrizet. His cooperation with Lafreri lasted until his death, for almost a decade, and produced engraved maps, prints and views of cities, as well as informative leaflets (avvisi) of important events of his time.

Salamanca died in Rome on 11 July 1562, and was buried in San Lorenzo in Damaso. After his death, in 1562, his son Francesco Salamanca continued the cooperation with Antonio Lafreri. Francesco managed his father's workshop until his death in Rome on 18 September 1585. After his death, his 635 printing plates were sold to Camillo Agrippa and Giacomo Lauro.

== Gallery ==
Salamanca's double cordiform map of the World, published in Rome in 1550

Verona Arena. Plate from the Speculum Romanae Magnificentiae, 1543, Rijksmuseum, Amsterdam

Arch of Janus. Plate from the Speculum Romanae Magnificentiae, 1543, Rijksmuseum, Amsterdam

Christ and the Virgin Mary, Rijksmuseum, Amsterdam

Christ walking on the water, 1548, Rijksmuseum, Amsterdam

Column of Antoninus and a Roman Obelisk, 1543–44, Metropolitan Museum of Art, New York

Conversion of Saul, from Michelangelo's fresco in the Cappella Paolina, c. 1545, Metropolitan Museum of Art, New York

Vulcan seated hammering on an anvil flanked by Venus and three cupids, 1515–27, Metropolitan Museum of Art, New York

== Sources ==
- Ehrle, Franz (1908). Roma prima di Sisto V: la pianta di Roma Du Perac-Lafrery del 1577 riprodotta nell’esemplare esistente nel Museo Britannico. Rome: Danesi. pp. 13, 35–39.
- Gallori, Corinna (March 2025). "Antonio Salamanca's First Marrige". Print Quarterly. LXII (1): 44–45.
- Pagani, Valeria (June 2000). "Documents on Antonio Salamanca". Print Quarterly. XVII (2): 148–155.
- Baker-Bates, P. (2012). "Antonio Salamanca: A Spanish Friend of Sebastiano del Piombo". Konsthistorisk Tidskrift/Journal of Art History. 81 (4): 211–218. doi:10.1080/00233609.2012.727861.
- Pagani, Valeria (2013). "La vendita della stamperia dei Salamanca, 1587". Annali della Pontificia insigne Accademia di belle arti e lettere dei Virtuosi al Pantheon. XIII: 475–494.
- Alberti, Alessia (2017). "Salamanca, Antonio". Dizionario Biografico degli Italiani (in Italian). Vol. 89: Rovereto–Salvemini. Rome: Istituto dell'Enciclopedia Italiana. ISBN 978-88-12-00032-6.
