= Jacques Callot =

French engraver (c.1592–1635)

Jacques Callot, Lucas Vorsterman the Elder after Anthony van Dyck

Jacques Callot (French: [ʒak kalo]; c. 1592 – 1635) was a baroque printmaker and draftsman from the Duchy of Lorraine. He is an important person in the development of the old master print. He made more than 1,400 etchings that chronicled the life of his period, featuring soldiers, clowns, drunkards, Romani, beggars, as well as court life. He also etched many religious and military images, and many prints featured extensive landscapes in their background.

== Life and training ==
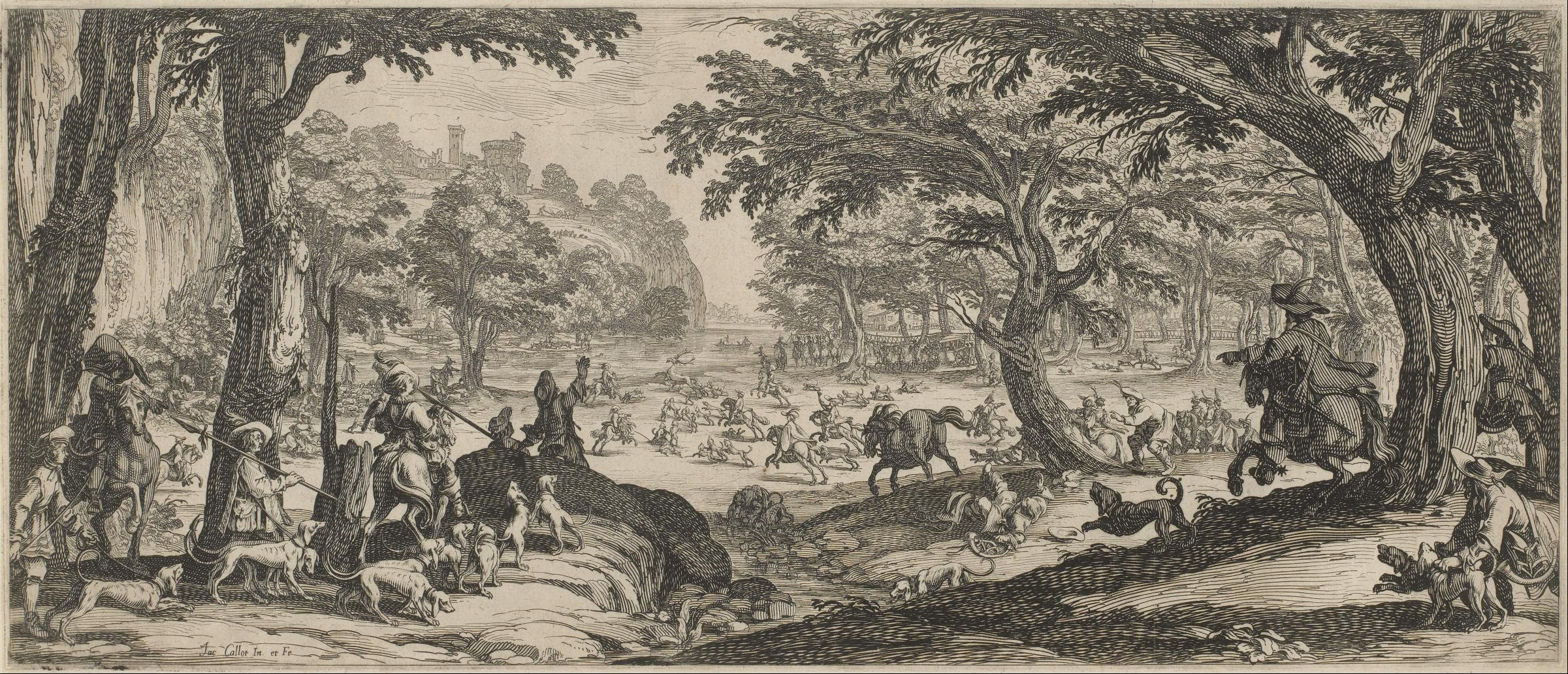
The Large Hunt, a famous technical showpiece

Callot was born and died in Nancy, the capital of Lorraine, now in France. At the time, the Duchy of Lorraine was an independent state on the north-eastern border of France, southwestern border of Germany and overlapping the southern Netherlands. He came from an important family (his father was master of ceremonies at the court of the Duke), and he often describes himself as having noble status in the inscriptions to his prints. At the age of fifteen he was apprenticed to a goldsmith, but soon afterward travelled to Rome where he learned engraving from an expatriate Frenchman, Philippe Thomassin. He probably then studied etching with Antonio Tempesta in Florence, where he lived from 1612 to 1621. More than 2,000 preparatory drawings and studies for prints survive, but no paintings by him are known, and he probably never trained as a painter.

During his period in Florence he became an independent master, and worked often for the Medici court. After the death of Cosimo II de' Medici during 1621, he returned to Nancy where he lived for the rest of his life, visiting Paris and the Netherlands later during the decade. He was commissioned by the courts of Lorraine, France and Spain, and by publishers, mostly in Paris. Although he remained in Nancy, his prints were distributed widely through Europe; Rembrandt was a keen collector of them.

== Technical innovations: échoppe, new hard ground, stopping-out ==
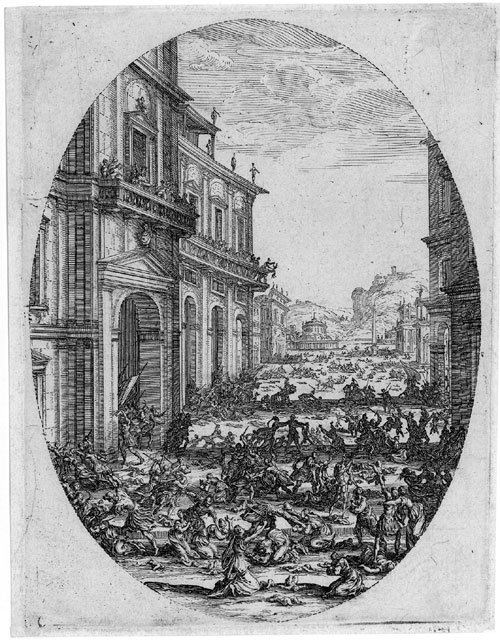
Massacre of the Innocents, showing the use of multiple stoppings-out to create the fainter lines of the distant view. 13.7 × 10.5 cm

His technique was exceptional, and was helped by important technical advances he made. He developed the échoppe, a type of etching-needle with a slanting oval section at the end, which enabled etchers to create a swelling line, as engravers were able to do.

He also seems to have been responsible for an improved recipe for the etching ground that coated the plate and was removed to form the image, using lute-makers varnish rather than a wax-based formula. This enabled lines to be etched more deeply, prolonging the life of the plate in printing, and also greatly reducing the risk of "foul-biting", such that acid gets through the ground to the plate where it is not intended to, producing spots or blotches on the image. Previously the risk of foul-biting had always been present, preventing an engraver from investing too much time on a single plate that risked being ruined by foul-biting. Now etchers could do the very detailed work that was previously the monopoly of engravers, and Callot made good use of the new possibilities.

He also made more extensive and sophisticated use of multiple "stoppings-out" than previous etchers had done. This is the technique of letting the acid dissolve lightly over the whole plate, then stopping-out those parts of the work which the artist wishes to keep shallow by covering them with ground before bathing the plate in acid again. He achieved unprecedented subtlety in effects of distance and light and shade by careful control of this process. Most of his prints were relatively small – as much as about six inches or 15 cm on their longest dimension.

One of his devotees, the Parisian Abraham Bosse spread Callot's innovations all over Europe with the first published manual of etching, which was translated into Italian, Dutch, German and English.

== Miseries of War ==
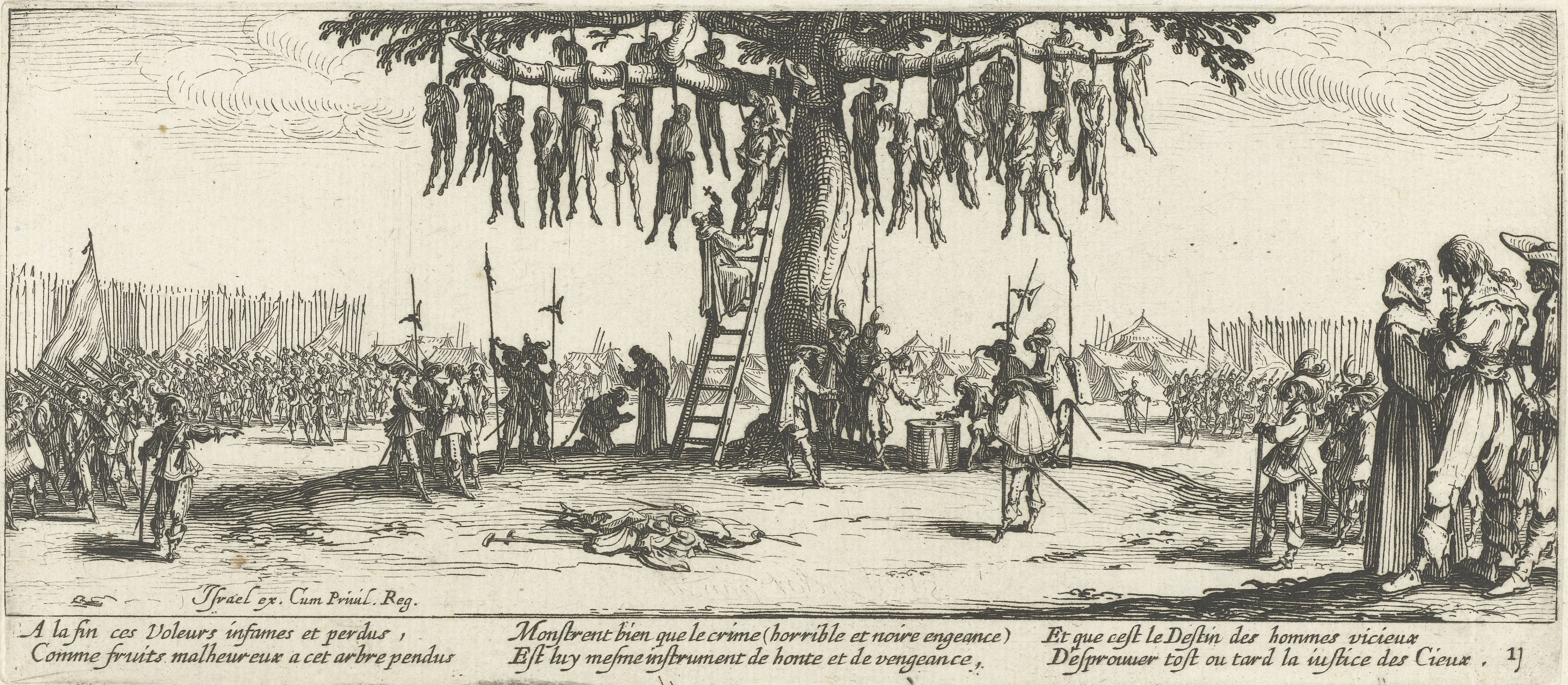
One of Les Grandes Misères de la guerre

His most famous prints are his two series of prints each on "the Miseries and Misfortunes of War". These are 18 prints published during 1633, and the earlier and incomplete Les Petites Misères – referring to their sizes, large and small (though even the large set are only about 8 × 13 cm). These images show soldiers pillaging and burning their way through towns, country and convents, before being variously arrested and executed by their superiors, lynched by peasants, or surviving to live as crippled beggars. At the end the generals are rewarded by their monarch. During 1633, the year the larger set was published, Lorraine had been invaded by the French during the Thirty Years' War and Callot's artwork is still noted with Francisco Goya's Los Desastres de la Guerra (The Disasters of War), which was influenced by Callot – (Goya owned a series of the prints), as among the most powerful artistic statements of the inhumanity of war.

== Grotesque Dwarves ==
Callot's series of "Grotesque Dwarves" were to inspire Derby porcelain and other companies to create pottery figures known as "Mansion House Dwarves" or "Grotesque Dwarves". The former title comes from a father and son who were paid to wander around the Mansion House in London wearing oversized hats that contained advertisements.

Varie Figure Gobbi – Series of 21 etchings, 1616

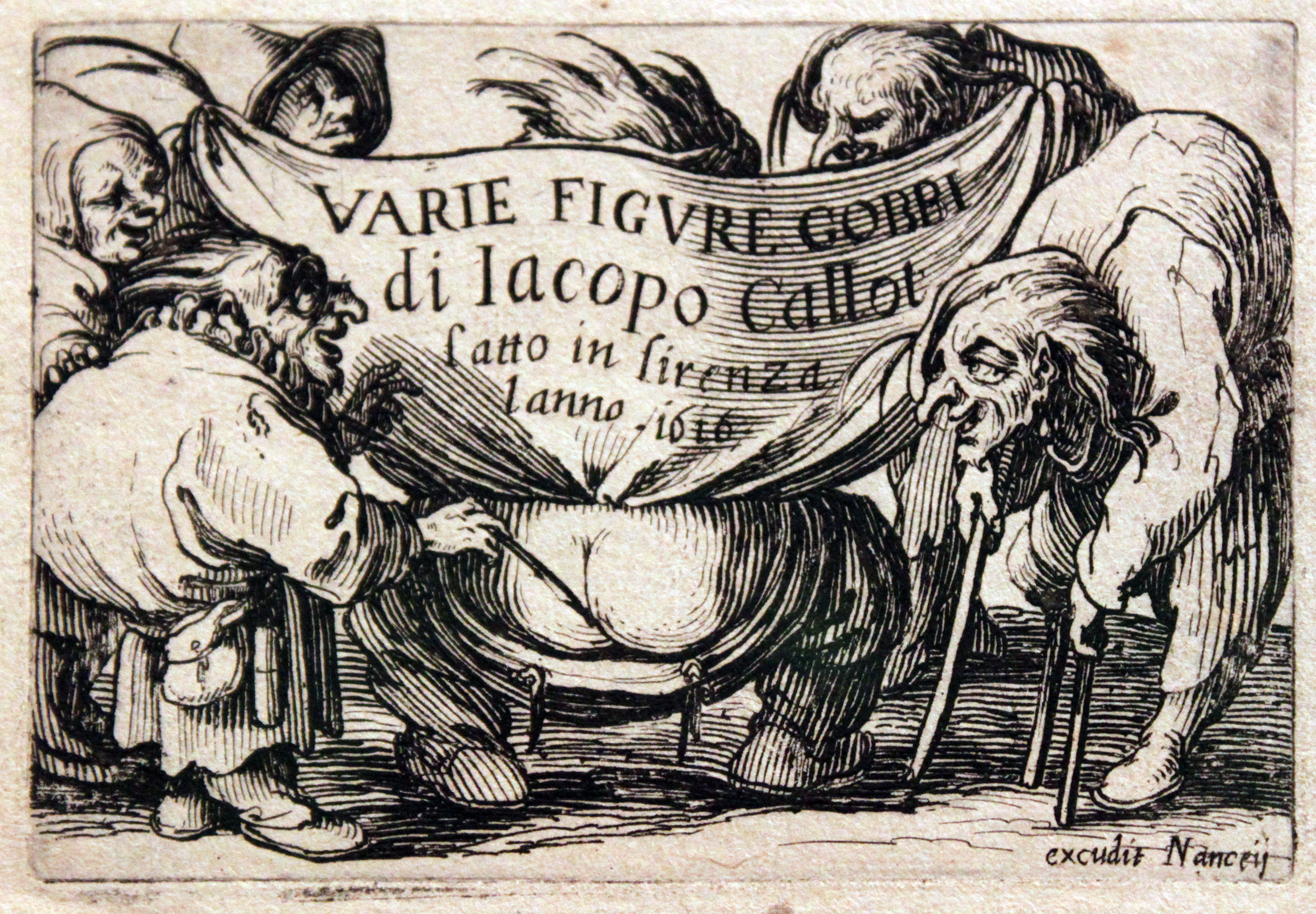
Varie Figure Gobbi, Städelsches Kunstinstitut

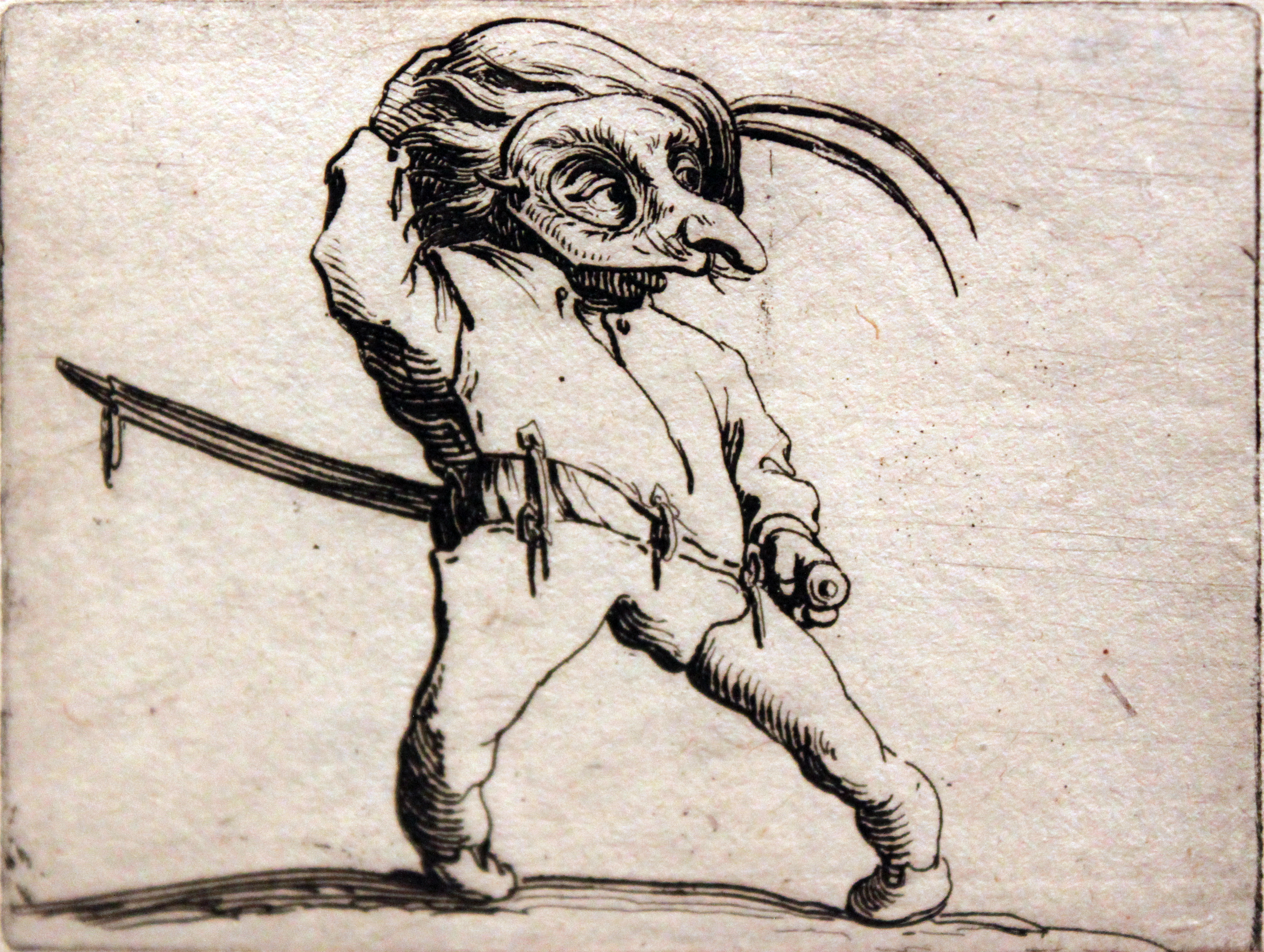
Masked Dwarf with Contorted Legs

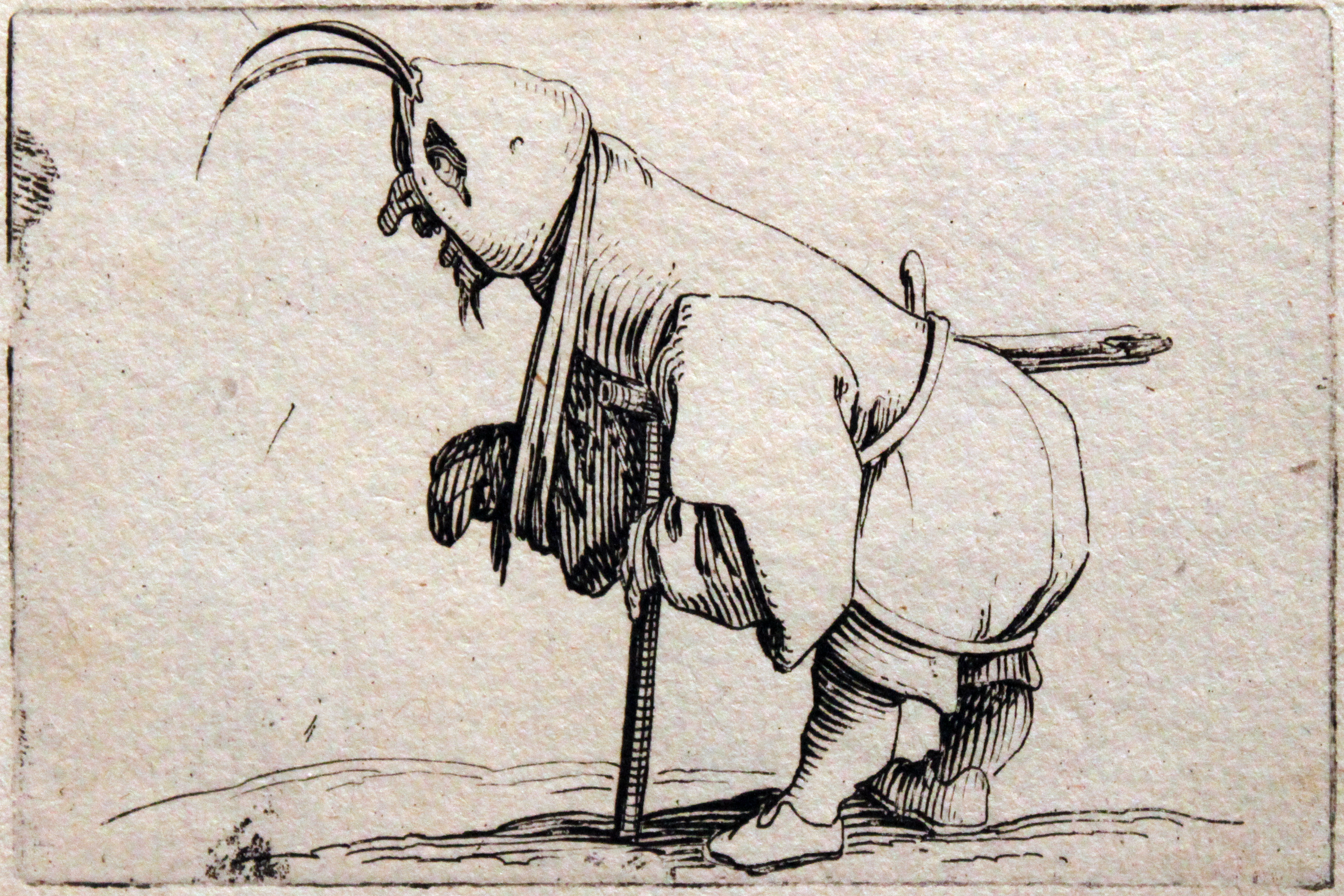
Crippled Dwarf with Hood

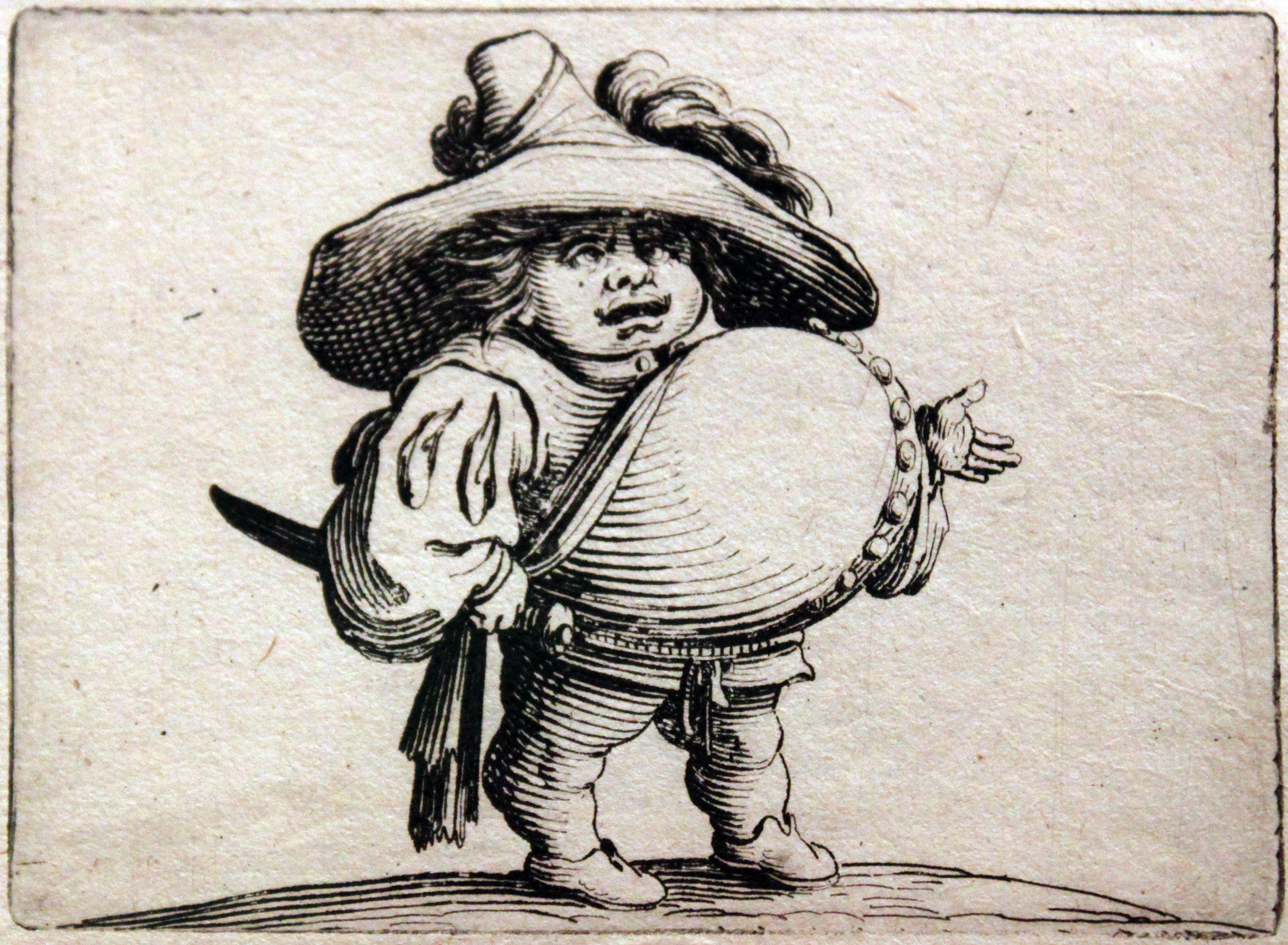
The Fat Dwarf

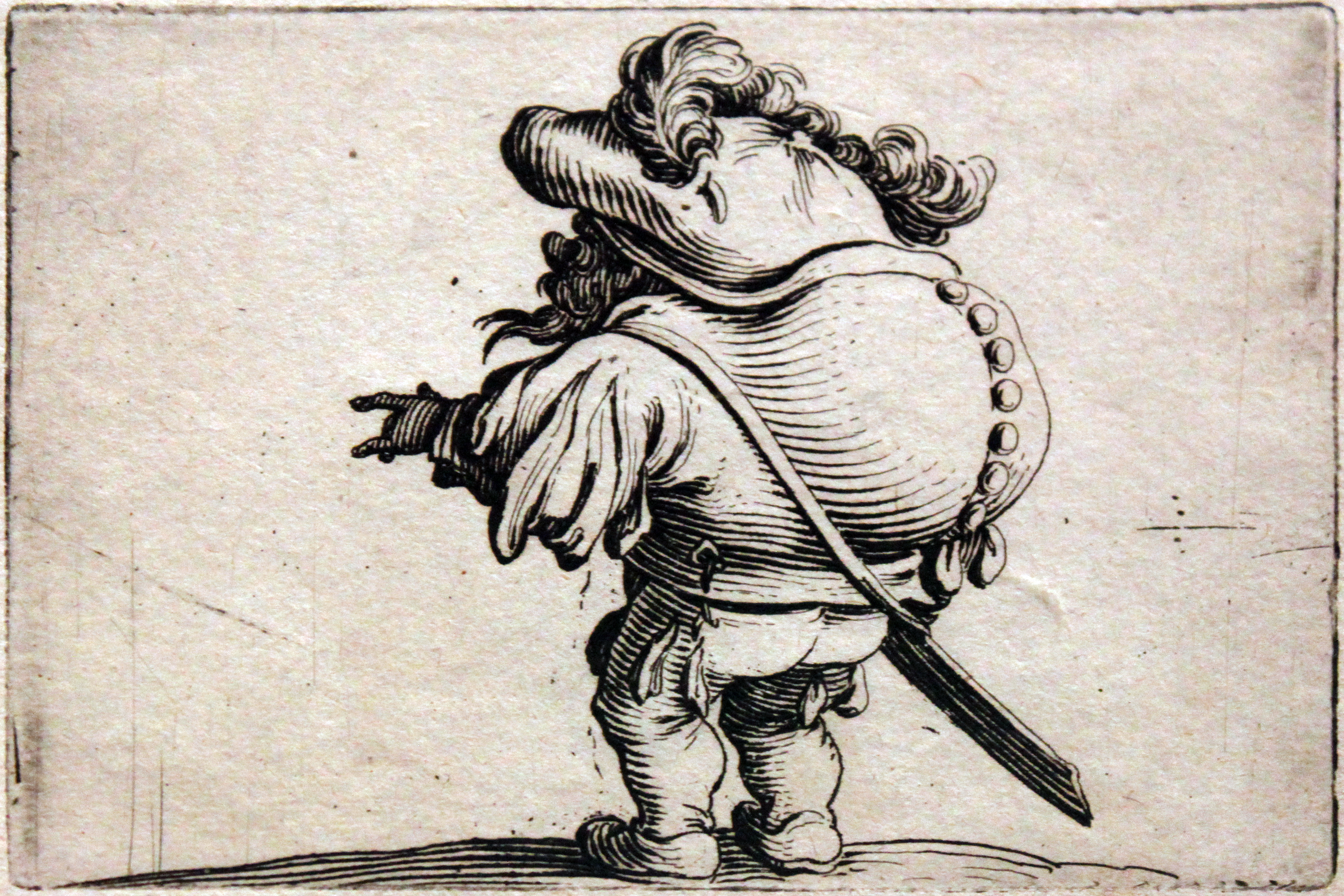
The Hunchbacked Dwarf

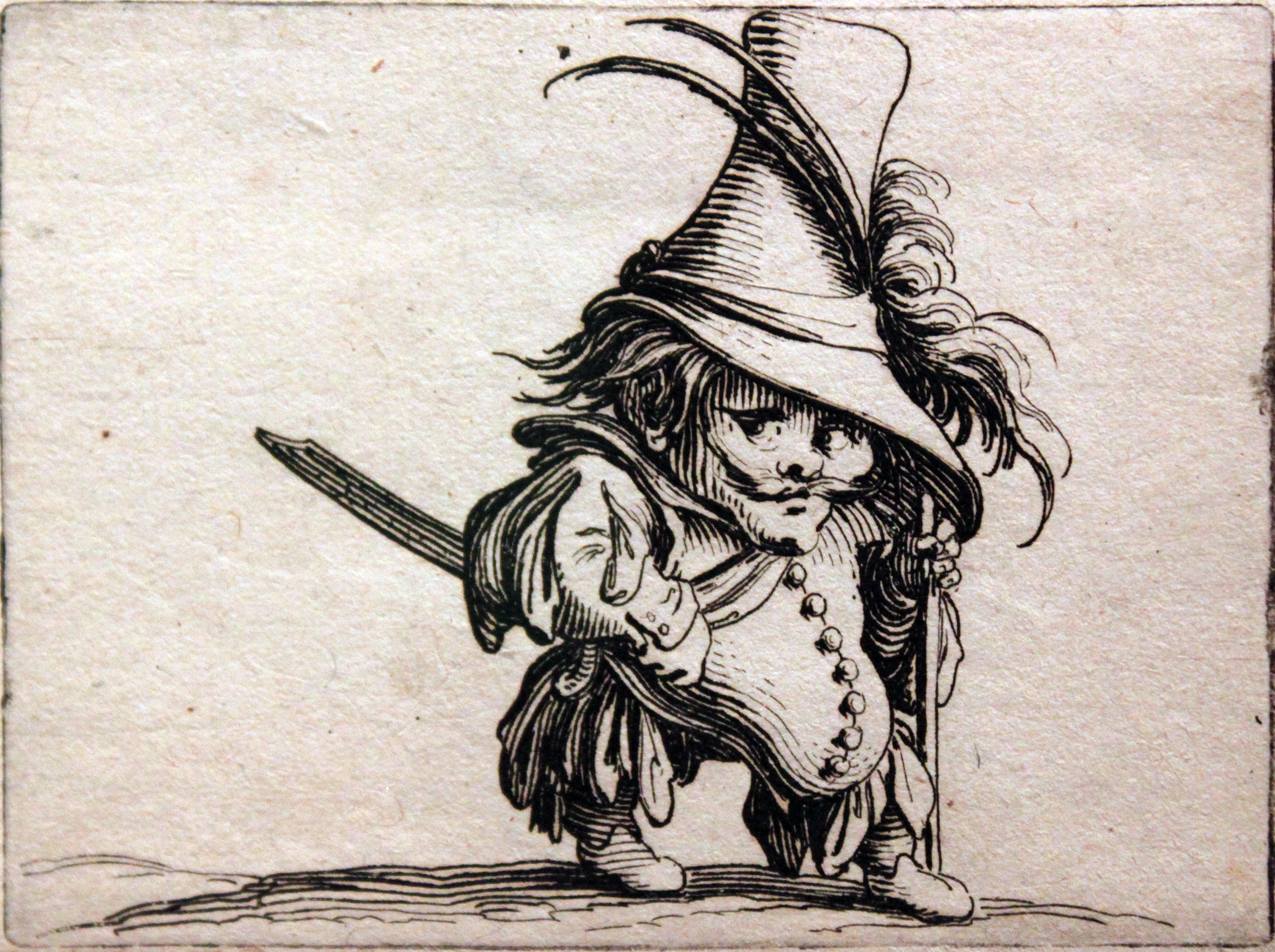
The Potbellied Dwarf with the Tall Hat

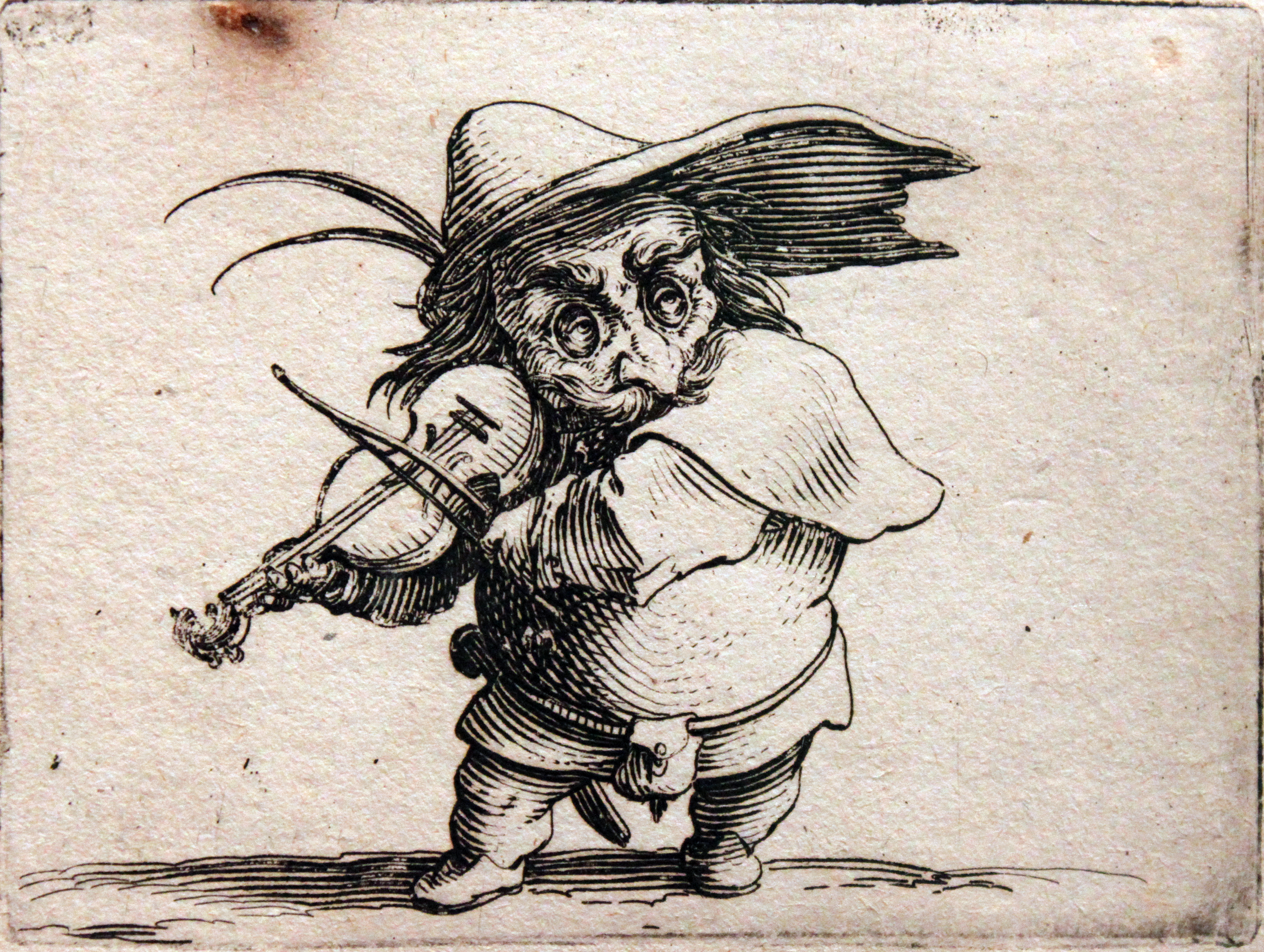
Dwarf with Violin

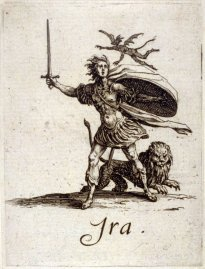
Example of Jacques Callot's work

== Other notable works ==
The Fair at Impruneta, 1620

- A large series depicting commedia dell'arte figures called Balli di Sfessania, in a simple, caricature-like style, from his years in Florence.
- Series on the Lives of Christ and Mary.
- Series on the story of the Prodigal Son.
- The Giant Tifeo beneath Mount Ischia (1617).
- The Fair at Impruneta (1620).
- The Fair at Gondreville (1624).
- The Temptation of St Anthony (1635, MoA).
