= Antonio Lafreri =

Burgundian engraver

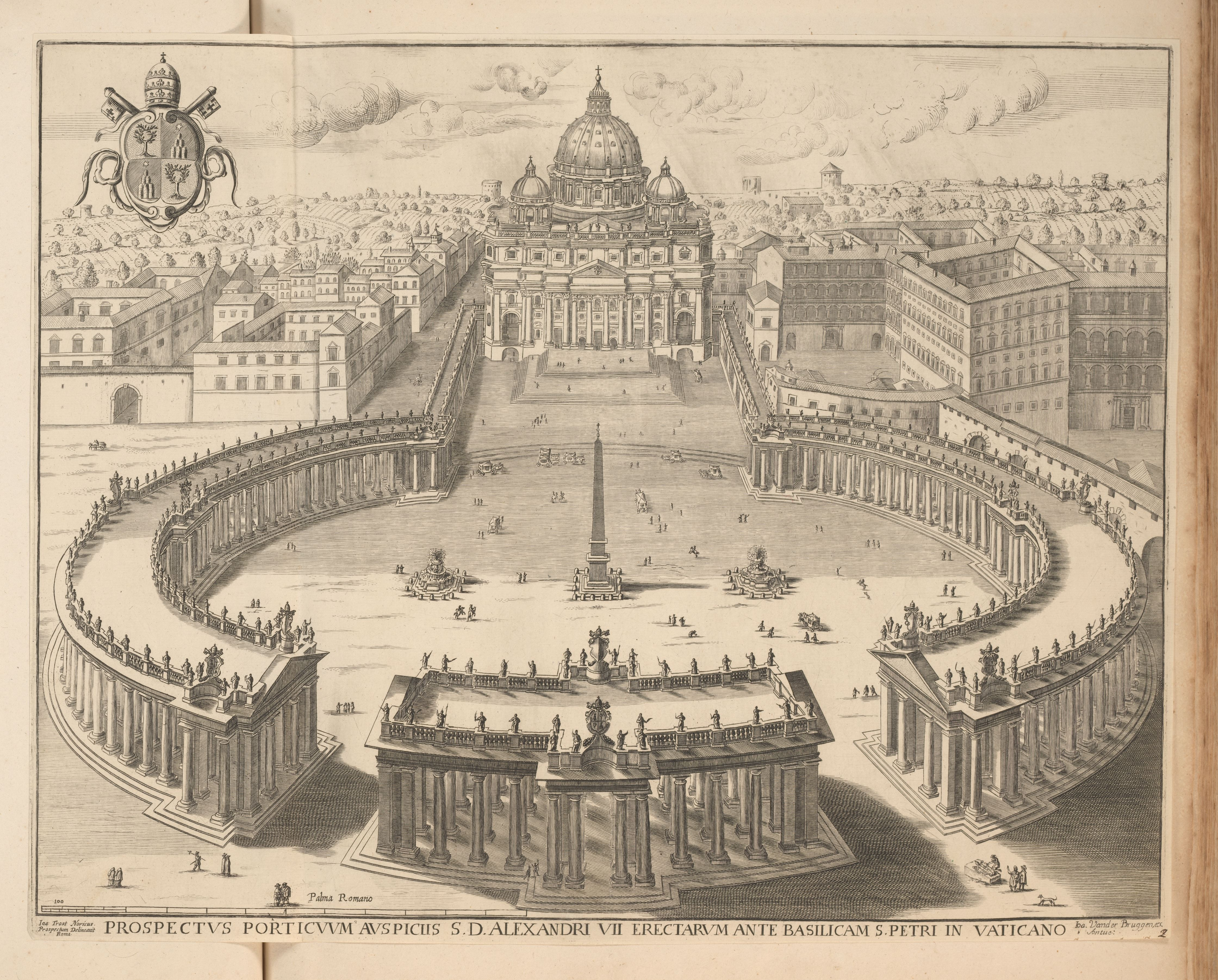
Saint Peter's square, a 1555 engraving of Lafreri from Speculum Romanae magnificentiae

Antoine du Pérac Lafréry (1512–1577), better known as Antonio Lafreri, was a Burgundian engraver, cartographer and publisher active in Rome.

== Biography ==
Born at Orgelet in the County of Burgundy, then part of the Holy Roman Empire, Lafreri settled in Rome around 1540. He became famous for his work as a publisher. Most of his engravings from 1544 to 1553 were copies of works by his rival Antonio Salamanca, whose associate he became in 1553. Their contract was broken in 1563 by Salamanca’s son Francesco.

Lafreri’s most important work, the Speculum romanae magnificentiae, was by its nature unfinished. It was an album of plans and views of Rome, executed between 1545 and 1577 by the best engravers in Rome. By 1567 it comprised 107 plates. The project, intended to give an account of ancient Rome, contained numerous reconstructions and extended to the architectural work of Michelangelo’s period, as well as to some events and festivals. The plates were captioned in Latin and in 1575 the collection was given a title page. The success of the project gave rise to various new editions, and some plates were replaced.

Lafréry’s edition of the Vestigi dell’antichità di Roma, engraved by Étienne Dupérac, was more particularly concerned with giving an account of ancient Roman sculpture, both public and private. Lafreri’s catalogue, published in 1572, was the first of its kind, both in the realm of engravings and in that of books. It mentioned some 500 titles, including an Atlas which comprised 35 views of the city and 80 maps and marked the beginning of modern cartography. On Lafreri’s death, his property was inherited by his cousins: Étienne Duchet (d. 1583), who sold his share to Paolo Graziani in 1582, and Claude Duchet (d. 1587) who executed exact copies of Lafreri’s engravings.

== Lafreri atlases ==
Lafreri is best known today for the so-called Lafreri atlases, published in Rome in 1570, one of the first organic collection of printed maps, having on its frontespice the figure of Atlas holding the earth. Reproductions of the City of Naples (cit. Miradois Palace), dated 1566, are on display at the Museum of San Martino in Naples. For the Atlas he collaborated with the most important Italian cartographers of the time: Giacomo Gastaldi, Battista Agnese, Antonio Salamanca, Francesco Camocio the Younger, Donato Bertelli, Ferando Bertelli and Paolo Forlani.

In 2014 the Bavarian State Library bought from a private collector the Atlases of Lafrery for 1.4 million euro.
