= Sorbonne (building) =

Historical university building in Paris, France

- La Sorbonne
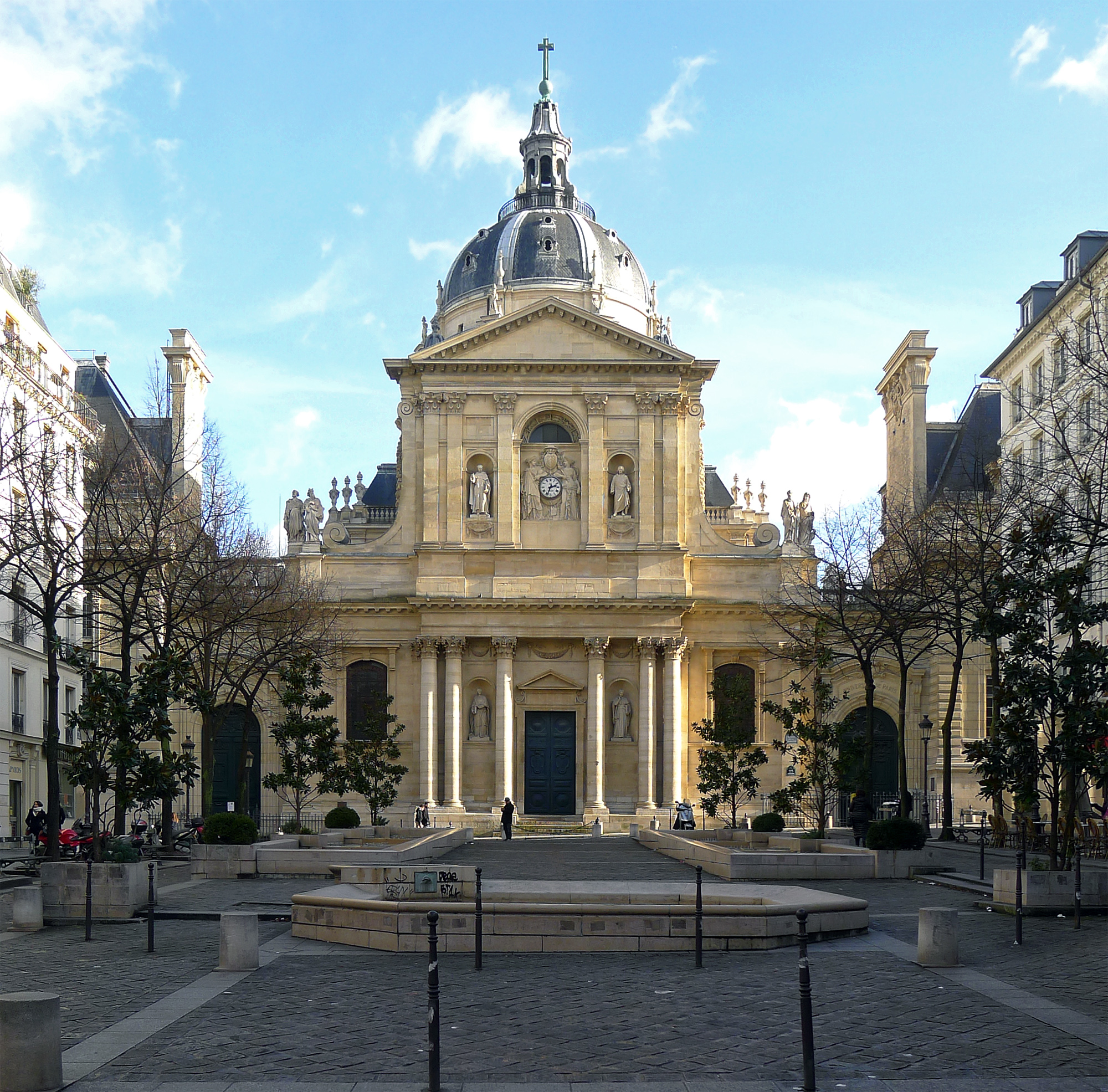
- The Sorbonne Chapel.

- Location within Paris
- Alternative names: La Sorbonne or Centre Sorbonne

General information
- Type: Academic
- Location: 1 Rue Victor
- Coordinates: 48.8485°N 2.3432°E
- Current tenants: Sorbonne University, Paris 1 Panthéon-Sorbonne University and Sorbonne Nouvelle University
- Completed: 1253 (1st building); 1635 (2nd building by Jacques Lemercier); 1884 (3rd building by Henri-Paul Nénot)
- Owner: Chancellerie des Universités de Paris

Design and construction
- Architect: Jacques Gondouin

The name Sorbonne (French: La Sorbonne; /sɔːrˈbɒn/ sor-BON, US also /sɔːrˈbɔːn/ sor-BAWN; French: [sɔʁbɔn]) is commonly used to refer to the historic University of Paris in Paris, France, or one of its successor institutions (see below). It is also the name of a building in the Latin Quarter of Paris which from 1253 onwards housed the College of Sorbonne, part of one of the first universities in the Western world, later renamed University of Paris and commonly known as "the Sorbonne". The Sorbonne building and the “La Sorbonne” trademark are owned by the Chancellerie des Universités de Paris.

In recent times the name "Sorbonne" came to refer to the group of liberal arts faculties of the University of Paris, in contrast to the vocational faculties of law and medicine. "Sorbonne" is also used to refer to the main building of the University of Paris in the 5th arrondissement of Paris, which houses several faculties created when the university was divided into thirteen autonomous universities in 1970.

Today, the building continues to house the successor universities of the University of Paris, such as:

- Sorbonne University,
- Paris 1 Panthéon-Sorbonne University,
- Sorbonne Nouvelle University,
- and the Chancellerie des Universités de Paris, which manages the building.

Sorbonne University is also now the university resulting from the merger on 1 January 2018 of UPMC (Paris VI) and Paris-Sorbonne University (Paris IV).

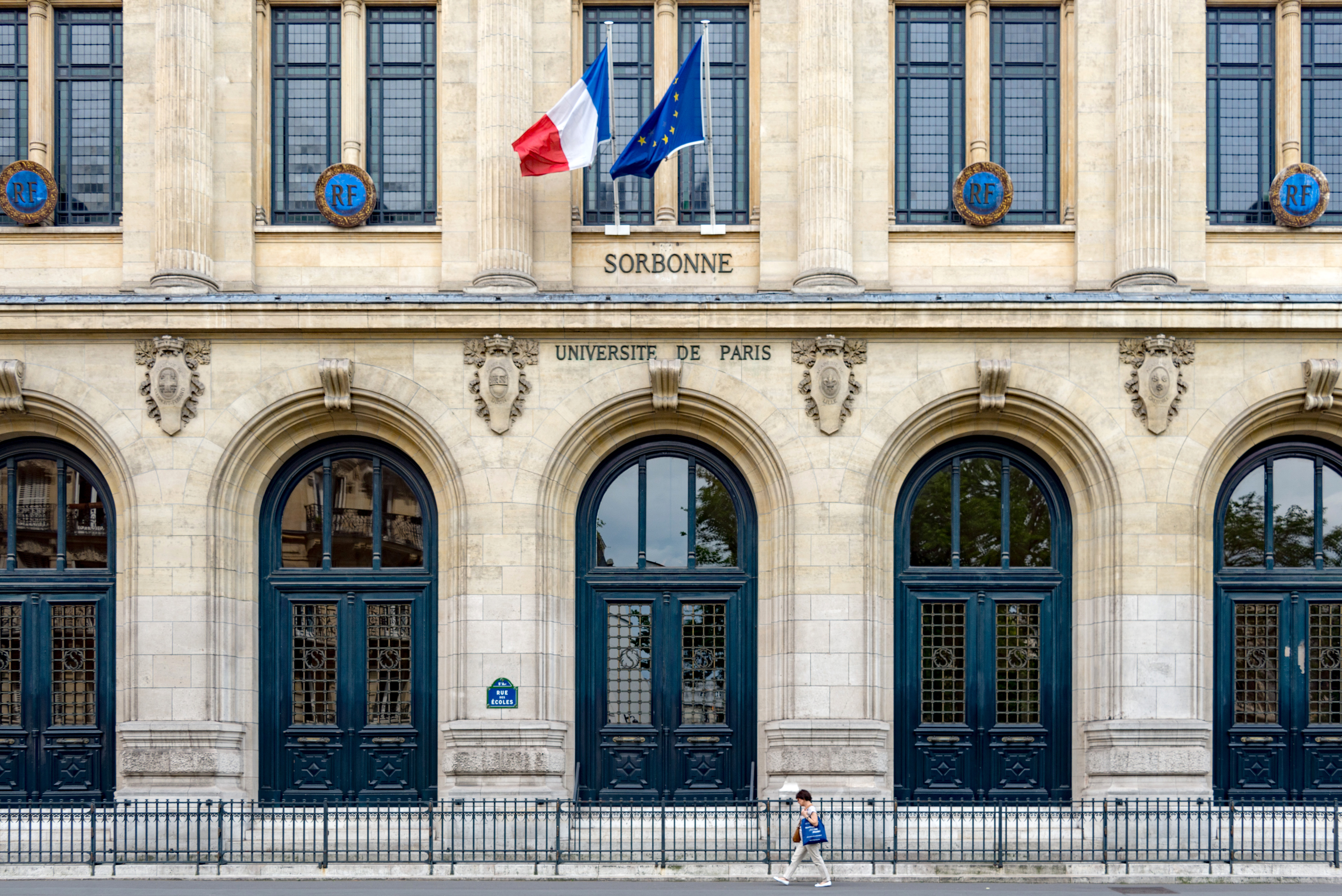
The building's primary entrance on the rue des Écoles

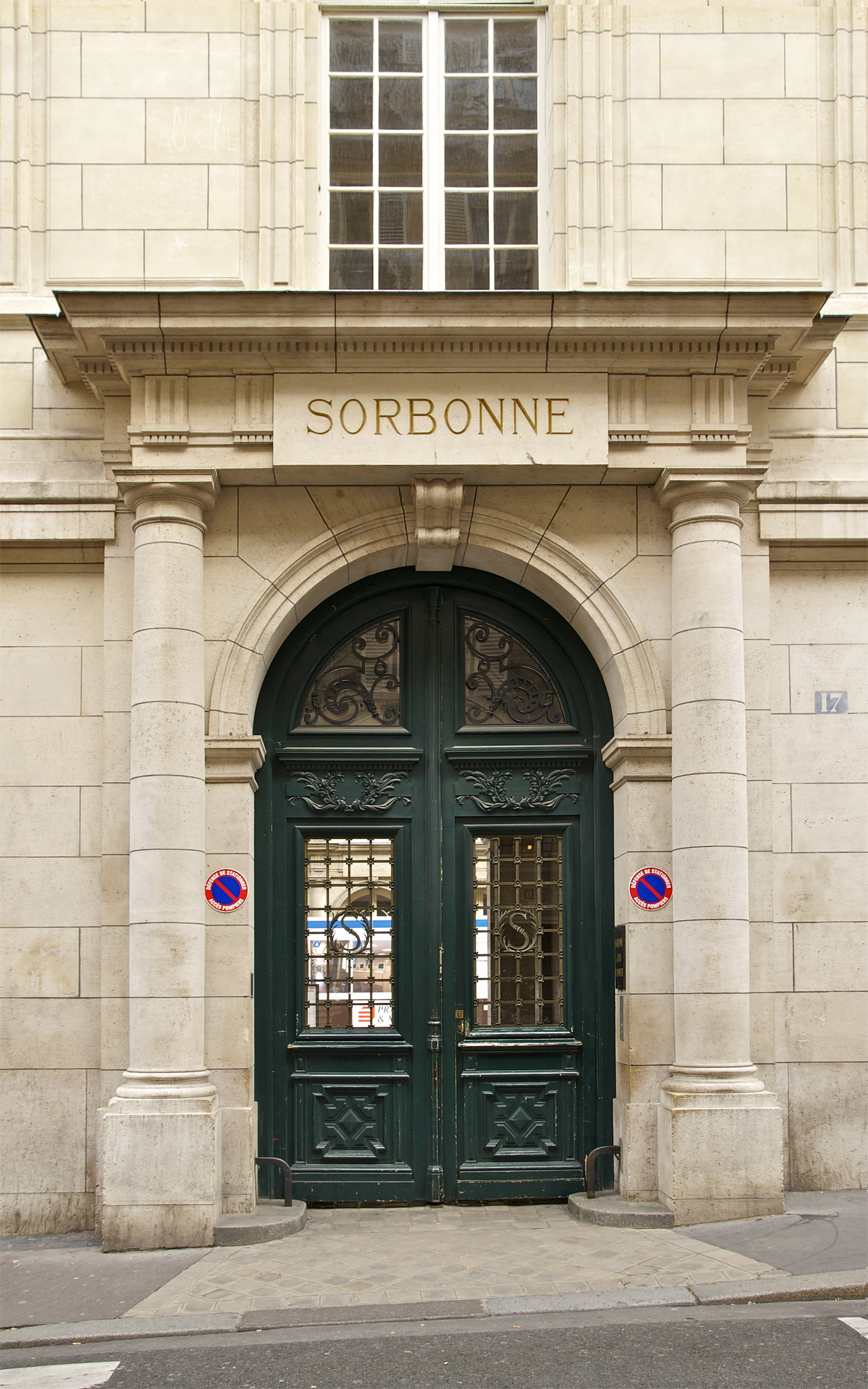
A side entrance with a sign reading "Sorbonne"

== Collège de Sorbonne ==
The college was founded in 1253 by Robert de Sorbon. Louis IX of France confirmed the foundation in 1257. It was one of the first significant colleges of the medieval University of Paris. The library was among the first to arrange items alphabetically according to title. The university predates the college by about a century, and minor colleges had been founded already during the late 12th century. During the 16th century, the Sorbonne became involved with the intellectual struggle between Catholics and Protestants. The university served as a major stronghold of Catholic conservative attitudes and, as such, conducted a struggle against King Francis I's policy of relative tolerance towards the French Protestants, except for a brief period during 1533 when the university was placed under Protestant control. The Sorbonne, acting in conjunction with the Catholic Church, condemned 500 printed works as heretical between 1544 and 1556.

The Collège de Sorbonne was suppressed during the French Revolution, reopened by Napoleon in 1808 and finally closed in 1882. This was only one of the many colleges of the University of Paris that existed until the French Revolution. Hastings Rashdall, in The Universities of Europe in the Middle Ages (1895), which is still a standard reference on the topic, lists some 70 colleges of the university from the Middle Ages alone; some of these were short-lived and disappeared already before the end of the medieval period, but others were founded during the early modern period, like the Collège des Quatre-Nations.

== Paris Faculty of Theology ==
With time, the college came to be the main French institution for theological studies and "Sorbonne" was frequently used as a synonym for the Paris Faculty of Theology despite being only one of many colleges of the university.

== May 1968 ==
After months of conflicts between students and authorities at the University of Paris at Nanterre, the administration closed that university on 2 May 1968. Students at the Sorbonne campus in Paris met on 3 May to protest against the closure and the threatened expulsion of several students at Nanterre.

On 6 May, the national student union, the Union Nationale des Étudiants de France (UNEF) – still the largest student union in France today – and the union of university teachers called a march to protest against the police invasion of Sorbonne. More than 20,000 students, teachers and other supporters marched towards the Sorbonne, still sealed off by the police, who charged, wielding their batons, as soon as the marchers approached. While the crowd dispersed, some began to make barricades out of whatever was at hand, while others threw paving stones, forcing the police to retreat for a time. The police then responded with tear gas and charged the crowd again. Hundreds of students were arrested.

10 May marked the "Night of Barricades" (Nuit des barricades), where students used cars, wood, and cobblestones to barricade the streets of the Latin Quarter. Brutal street fighting ensued between students and riot police, most notably on Rue Gay-Lussac. Early the next morning, as the fighting disbanded, Daniel Cohn-Bendit sent out a radio broadcast calling for a general strike. On Monday, 13 May, more than one million workers went on strike and the students declared that the Sorbonne was "open to the public". Negotiations ended, and students returned to their campuses after a false report that the government had agreed to reopen them, only to discover police still occupying the schools.

When the Sorbonne reopened, students occupied it and declared it an autonomous "People's University". During the weeks that followed, approximately 401 popular action committees were established in Paris and elsewhere to document grievances against the government and French society, including the Occupation Committee of the Sorbonne.

== Current state of affairs ==
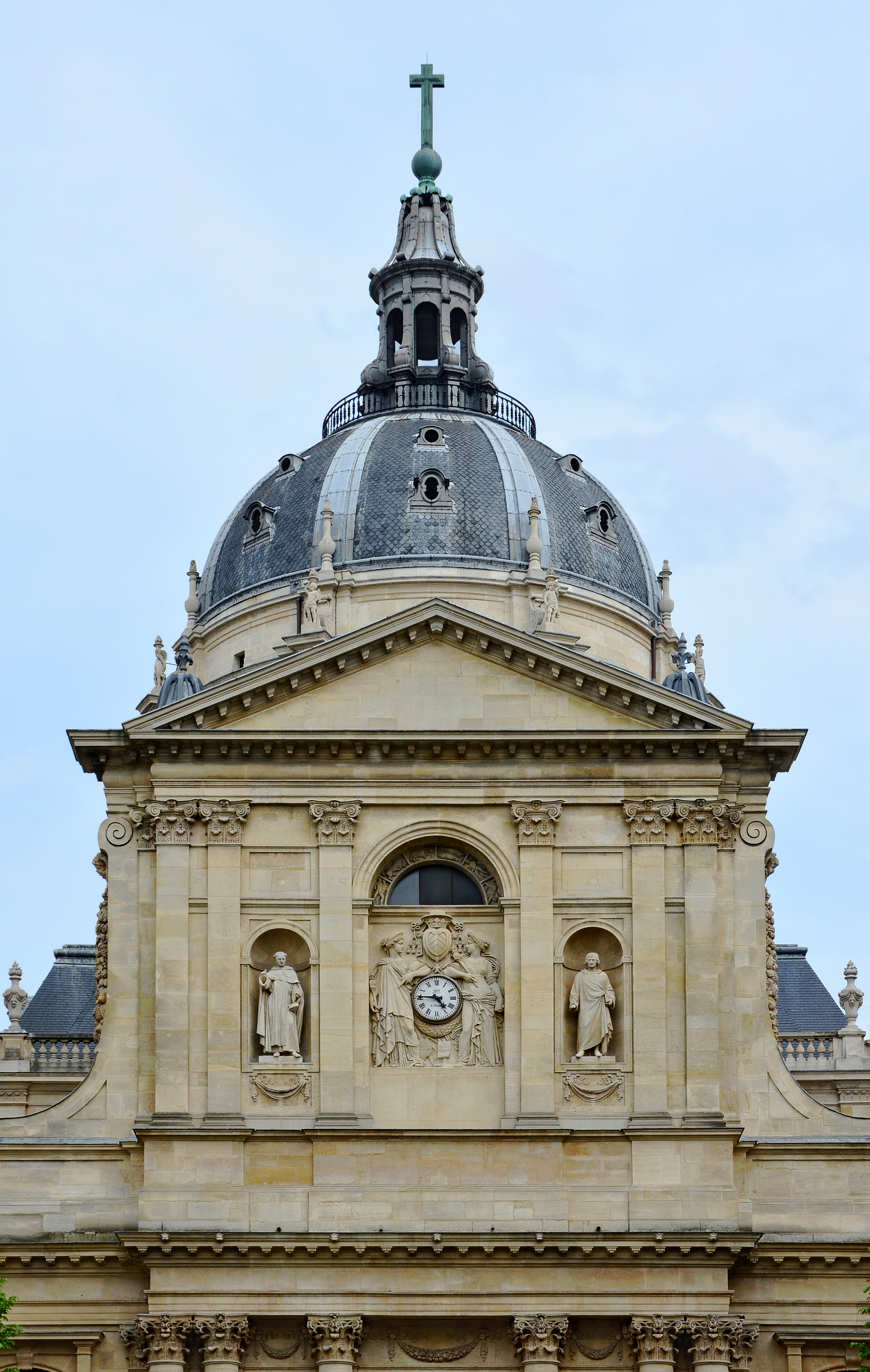
The West façade of the chapel with its dome behind it

In 1970, the University of Paris was divided into thirteen universities, managed by a common rectorate, the Chancellerie des universités de Paris, with offices in the Sorbonne. Some of them maintain facilities in the historical building of the Sorbonne: initially the universities of Paris 1 (Panthéon-Sorbonne), Paris 3 (Sorbonne-Nouvelle), Paris 4 (Paris-Sorbonne), Paris 5 (Paris-Descartes) and Paris 7 (Paris-Diderot). Nowadays, Paris 4 has merged with Paris 6 into Sorbonne-Université, and Paris 5 has merged with Paris 7 into Paris-Cité.

The building also houses the École Nationale des Chartes (until 2014), the École pratique des hautes études, the Cours de Civilisation Française de la Sorbonne and the Bibliothèque de la Sorbonne.

The Sorbonne Chapel was classified as a French historic monument in 1887. The amphitheatre (Le Grand Amphithéâtre) and the entire building complex (façades and roofs) became monuments in 1975.

== Sorbonne name dispute ==
=== Division and common assets ===
Following the May 1968 events, French higher education was reorganized by the Faure law of 12 November 1968. Among other changes, the activities of the universities were structured around 648 provisional "Education and Research Units" (Unités d'Enseignement et de Recherche, UER). After that, the personnel of these UERs had to submit for approval by the Ministry of Higher Education a project to regroup their UERs into new universities.

Some universities in Paris and other cities had grown to unprecedented proportions. This had significant impacts on the management and governance of each faculty, which operated with great autonomy from the central university administration. In the case of Paris, the original university could be divided around the boundaries of some faculties, but even then the size of the resulting UERs could justify further dividing them. This is what ultimately happened, with Law being divided between the universities of Paris 1 and Paris 2, Languages and Literature between Paris 3 and Paris 4, and Sciences between Paris 6 and Paris 7. The result was 13 autonomous universities.

Similar divisions took place in Bordeaux, Grenoble, Lyon, Lille, Montpellier, Rennes, Toulouse and Strasbourg. This trend of division of the historical universities would be partially reversed after 2005 by projects encouraged by the French government, such as the PRES and the COMUE, and even more by the complete mergers achieved later (see below).

In Paris some of the universities maintain operations in the Sorbonne building and decided to keep the word Sorbonne in their names: The University of Paris 1 (Panthéon-Sorbonne), the University of Paris 3 (Sorbonne-Nouvelle) and the University of Paris 4 (Paris-Sorbonne). Two other universities maintain operations in the building but opted to abandon the name: the University of Paris 5 (Paris Descartes) and the University of Paris 7 (Paris Diderot).

Two additional higher education institutions also remained active in the historical Sorbonne building: the École des chartes (until 2014) and the École pratique de hautes études. Furthermore, the University of Paris 2 (Panthéon-Assas), while not based in the Sorbonne building, continued to operate from the Panthéon site across the Cujas street.

The common heritage and estate of the University of Paris (including the Sorbonne building) was not divided and instead placed under the authority of a common administration: the Chancellerie des Universités de Paris, whose headquarters are also located in the Sorbonne building.

The building as a whole is then a common asset of the 13 successor universities of the University of Paris, and particularly the monumental sections are not attributed to any single university (but shared by all of them): the Sorbonne Chapel, the Cour d'honneur, the Péristyle and the Grand amphithéâtre.

Some of the dependencies are administered by one of the successor universities (while remaining a common asset). The library of the Sorbonne (Bibliothèque Interuniversitaire de la Sorbonne) is a common library of the universities Panthéon-Sorbonne and Sorbonne-Nouvelle, administered by Panthéon-Sorbonne.

The classrooms, libraries and administrative offices are attributed to the universities maintaining operations in the building: Panthéon-Sorbonne, Sorbonne-Nouvelle, Sorbonne-Université (which also has its headquarters) and Paris-Cité. All of them also operate in other campuses established across Paris.

=== Brands and mergers after 1990 ===
Despite being a highly valued brand, the Sorbonne universities did not register their names as trademarks until the 1990s. Over the following years, they established partnerships, merging projects and associated institutions with the name Sorbonne, sometimes triggering conflicts over the usage and ownership of the name.

After 1968, almost 30 years went by without any of them registering their names as a trademark. The first one to do it was the University of Paris 4 Paris-Sorbonne, who trademarked the name Université de Paris-Sorbonne in 1996, followed by the registration of the updated logos over the next decade. It was followed by Sorbonne-Nouvelle and Panthéon-Sorbonne in 1999. In 2007 Paris 4 trademarked also the brand "La Sorbonne". In 2006 it had granted permission to the authorities of Abu Dhabi to use the brand Sorbonne in the entire Middle east region; the "Sorbonne Abu Dhabi" logo was trademarked in 2007, blocking other Sorbonne universities from doing the same. This last initiative triggered a crisis with the other Sorbonne universities, forcing the French authorities to intervene.

==== Sorbonne-Université ====
The local governments of Paris and the Île de France region threatened to block the merger of Paris 2, Paris 4 and Paris 6, who had trademarked the brand "Université de la Sorbonne", if they persisted in taking over the name Sorbonne for themselves at the expense of the other Sorbonne universities.

Later the merging project advanced only with Paris 4 and Paris 6 but was forced to reconsider the name Sorbonne Université. The compromise in 2010 consisted of adding a "s" at the end of the name of the project (the future merged university would be named later), making it Sorbonne Universités. In 2018 the project effectively merged the former universities of Paris 4 and 6, taking the name "Sorbonne-Université" with or without the hyphen. In line with the naming convention and with the former crisis of 2006 in the background, the number in the name disappears and the accompanying name becomes "Sorbonne Université", replacing "Paris-Sorbonne" and "Pierre et Marie Curie".

The new naming is then "Université Sorbonne Université" or "Université Sorbonne-Université" though colloquially and in most communications, and in registered trademarks is simply "Sorbonne Université". The first "University" in the name refers to the fact that it is a University – only public higher education institutions are allowed to use that term in France– and the second "University" comes from the naming convention of adding a name after the City-number designation.

Nonetheless, while in French there's no confusion between "Université de la Sorbonne" and "Sorbonne-Université", in English the confusion is possible, as both are often translated as Sorbonne University.

==== Paris-Cité ====
The universities of Paris 3 (Sorbonne-Nouvelle), Paris 5 (Paris-Descartes), Paris 7 (Paris-Diderot) and Paris 13 (Paris-Nord) planned a merger set to be completed in 2019. In 2016 Paris 13 exited the project, followed the next year by Paris 3. In 2019 Paris 5 and Paris 7 achieved the merger. The project was initially named "Université Sorbonne-Paris-Cité", but after the exits the name eventually registered was "Université de Paris" (University of Paris). For reasons similar to the dispute around the name "Université de la Sorbonne", the University of Paris 2 (Panthéon-Assas) filed a lawsuit to block the usage of the name "Université de Paris".

The court (Conseil d'Etat) considered that naming the merger "Université de Paris" would indeed wrongly suggest that it is "the only successor of the former university", and ordered a name change. The name finally adopted after the ruling was Université Paris-Cité.

==== Sorbonne-Assas ====
The University of Paris 2 (Panthéon-Assas) trademarked the brand "Université Sorbonne-Assas" in 2007 and "Sorbonne-Assas" in 2013. It offers an international degree in its Sorbonne-Assas International Law School.

==== Sorbonne Paris-Nord ====
In 2019, the University of Paris 13 Paris-Nord was renamed Sorbonne Paris-Nord.

=== Cooperation agreements ===
==== Alliance Sorbonne Paris Cité ====
A cooperation agreement was established in 2020 between Paris-Cité University and other higher education institutions, including Sorbonne Paris-Nord University. Sorbonne-Nouvelle was initially a member but switched to a different cooperation program established with Panthéon-Sorbonne.

==== Sorbonne Alliance ====
Also created in 2020, this cooperation agreement includes the universities of Panthéon-Sorbonne and Sorbonne-Nouvelle.

== See also ==
- Listing of the works of Alexandre Falguière
- List of works by Henri Chapu
- List of tourist attractions in Paris
