= SAUP =

SAUP may refer to:

- Sea Around Us Project, an international research group based at the University of British Columbia UBC Fisheries Centre devoted to studying the impacts of fisheries on the world's marine ecosystems
- San Antonio Unido Portuario, a football club located in the port city of San Antonio, Chile
- Société des Amis des Universités de Paris (English: the Society of Friends of the Universities of Paris)
