= Sorbonne Chapel =

Chapel in Paris, France

- Chapelle Sainte-Ursule de la Sorbonne
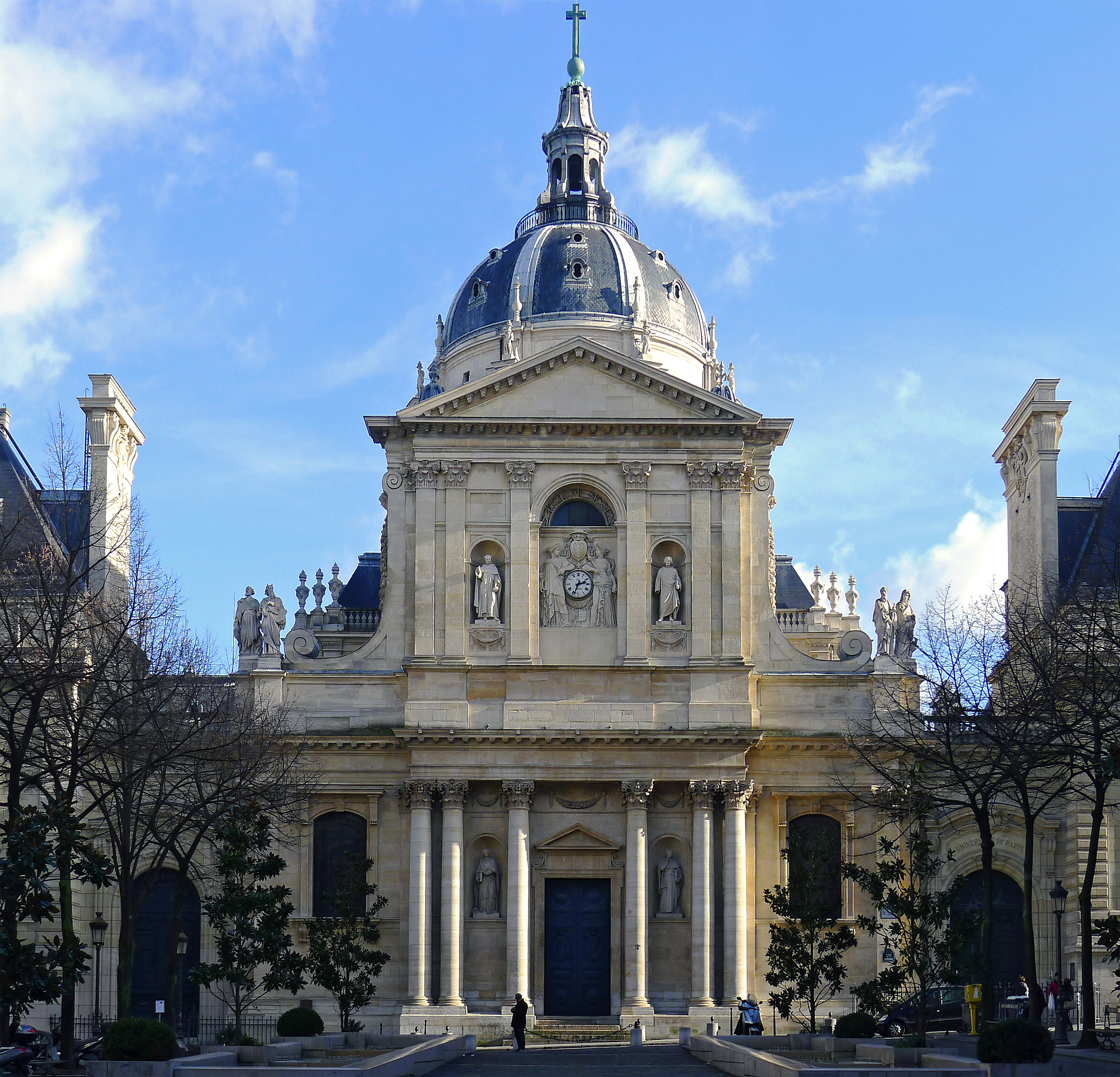
- Sorbonne Chapel west façade and dome
- Sorbonne Chapel
- 48°50′54″N 2°20′35″E
- Location: 17 Rue de la Sorbonne, V^{e} arrondissement, Paris (Metro: Cluny-Sorbonne)
- Country: France
- Denomination: Catholic Church

History
- Status: Chapel (closed)
- Founded: 1626
- Founder: Cardinal Richelieu
- Events: Entombment of Cardinal Richelieu (1648)

Architecture
- Functional status: Closed for renovations; access via appointment only
- Architect: Jacques Lemercier
- Architectural type: Chapel
- Years built: 1627–1648
- Completed: 1648; 378 years ago

The Chapel of Sainte-Ursule de la Sorbonne, also known as the Sorbonne Chapel, is a chapel at the Sorbonne in the Latin Quarter of Paris, France. Designed by Jacques Lemercier, the present chapel was built as part of Cardinal Richelieu's reconstruction of the College of Sorbonne. Its design combined its function as the college chapel with that of a funerary monument to Richelieu, whose tomb stands beneath its dome. It is the only surviving building of Richelieu's 17th-century reconstruction of the college, the remainder having been replaced during the rebuilding of the Sorbonne in the late 19th century.

During the French Revolution, the chapel was vandalized and much of its furnishings and decoration were dispersed or destroyed. It was returned to religious use in the 19th century and was designated a historic monument in 1887. In the 20th century it served various functions and, during the 1980s and 1990s, was regularly used as an exhibition space.

After being damaged by a storm in 1999, the chapel was closed for safety reasons and has since remained generally inaccessible, except on special occasions. Its façades and roofs were restored between 2004 and 2008, and a wider programme of restoration is ongoing with the aim of reopening the chapel to the public.

== History ==
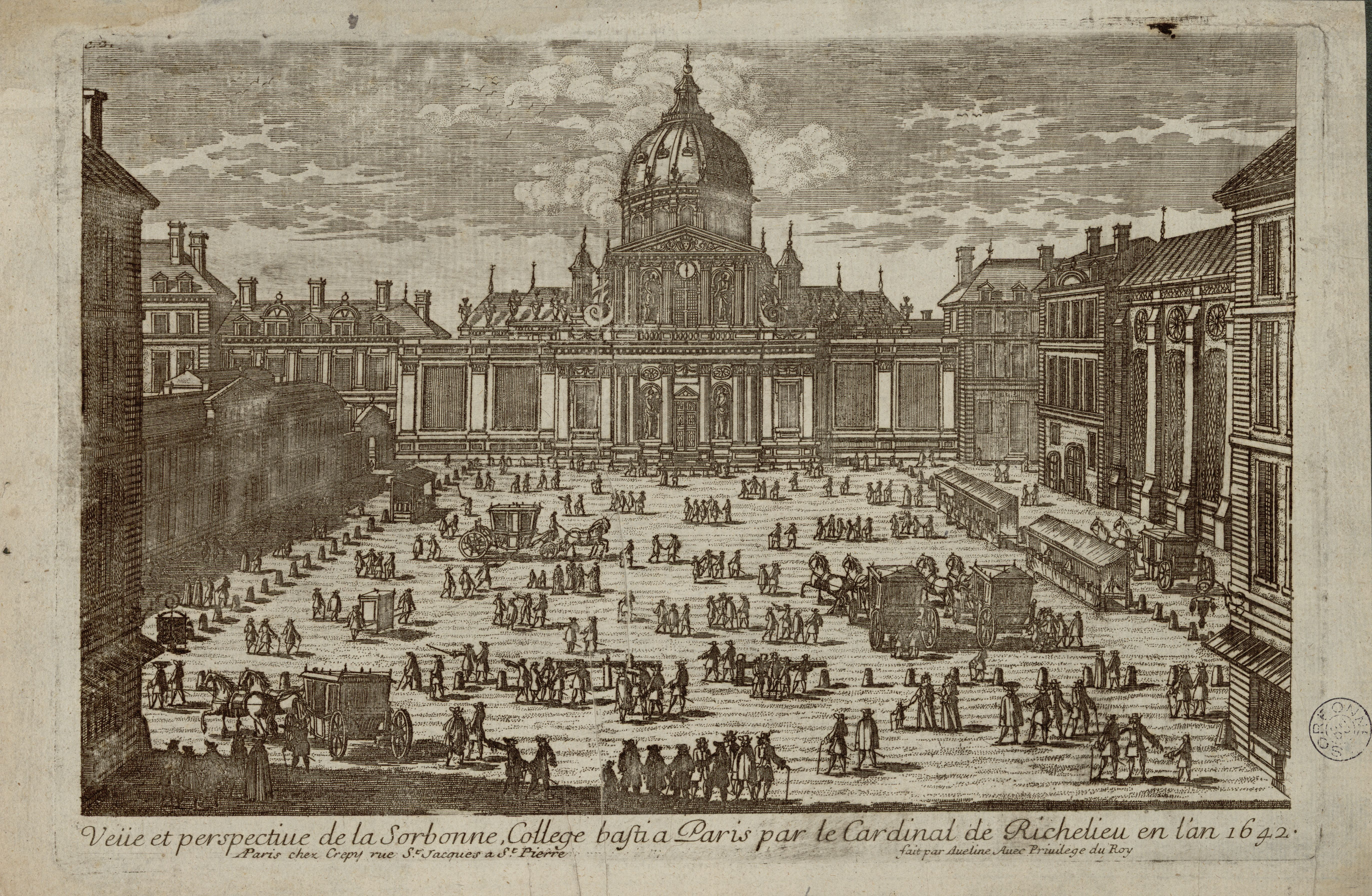
The north façade and courtyard in 1642

In 1257, Robert de Sorbon, the chaplain and confessor of Louis IX of France, persuaded the king to establish a college of theology in Paris. The new college became a major European centre of theological studies, and an active participant in the battle against Protestantism in the 16th century and against Jansenism in the 18th century.

By the 17th century, the buildings of the medieval College of Sorbonne were in poor condition. Cardinal Richelieu, its proviseur and a minister of state under Louis XIII, secured royal support to rebuild the college. The previous chapel was demolished; the outline of its location is now marked on the tiles of the court of honour. Construction of the new chapel began in 1627.

The architect of the new chapel was Jacques Lemercier, who had constructed a palace for Cardinal Richelieu (now the Palais-Royal). The interior of the dome was painted by Philippe de Champaigne, while François Girardon sculpted Richelieu's tomb which originally stood in the church. Construction lasted from 1627 to 1648. At his request, Richelieu was buried in the chapel.

During the French Revolution, the chapel was declared a Temple of Reason and stripped of all its ornament. It was not returned to the Catholic Church until 1822.

The chapel was designated a historic monument in 1887, joined in 1975 by other structures of the Sorbonne complex.

During the 1980s and 1990s, it was used as an exhibition venue and regularly opened to visitors. Damage caused by a storm in 1999 forced its closure on safety grounds; restoration of the façades and roofs was subsequently carried out between 2004 and 2008. Further conservation work began in the 2020s, including restoration of the tombs, monumental doors and interior paintings, as part of a wider programme intended to return the building to public use.

Engravings taken from L'Architecture française by architect Jean Marot (1686)

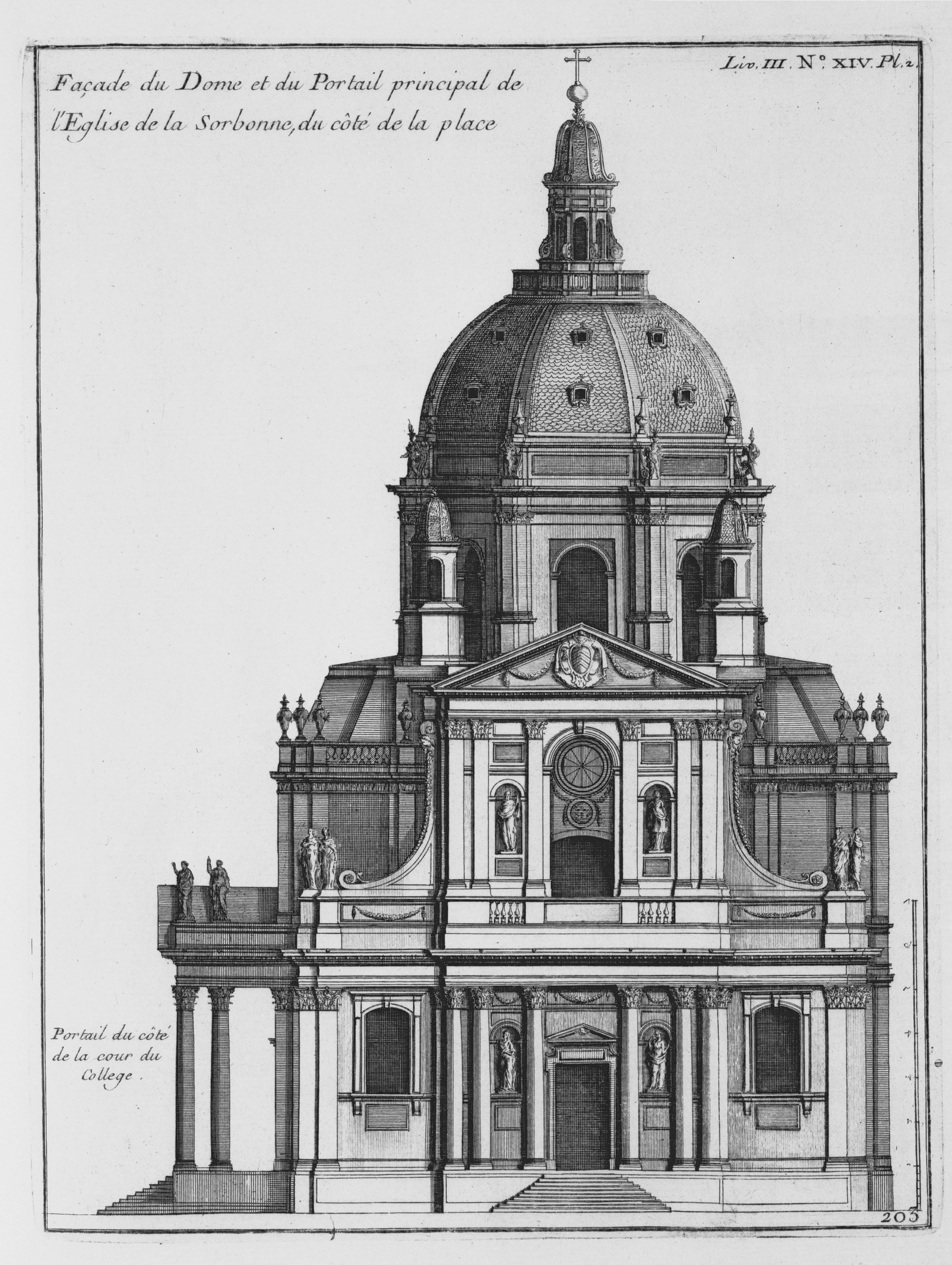
Elevation of the façade

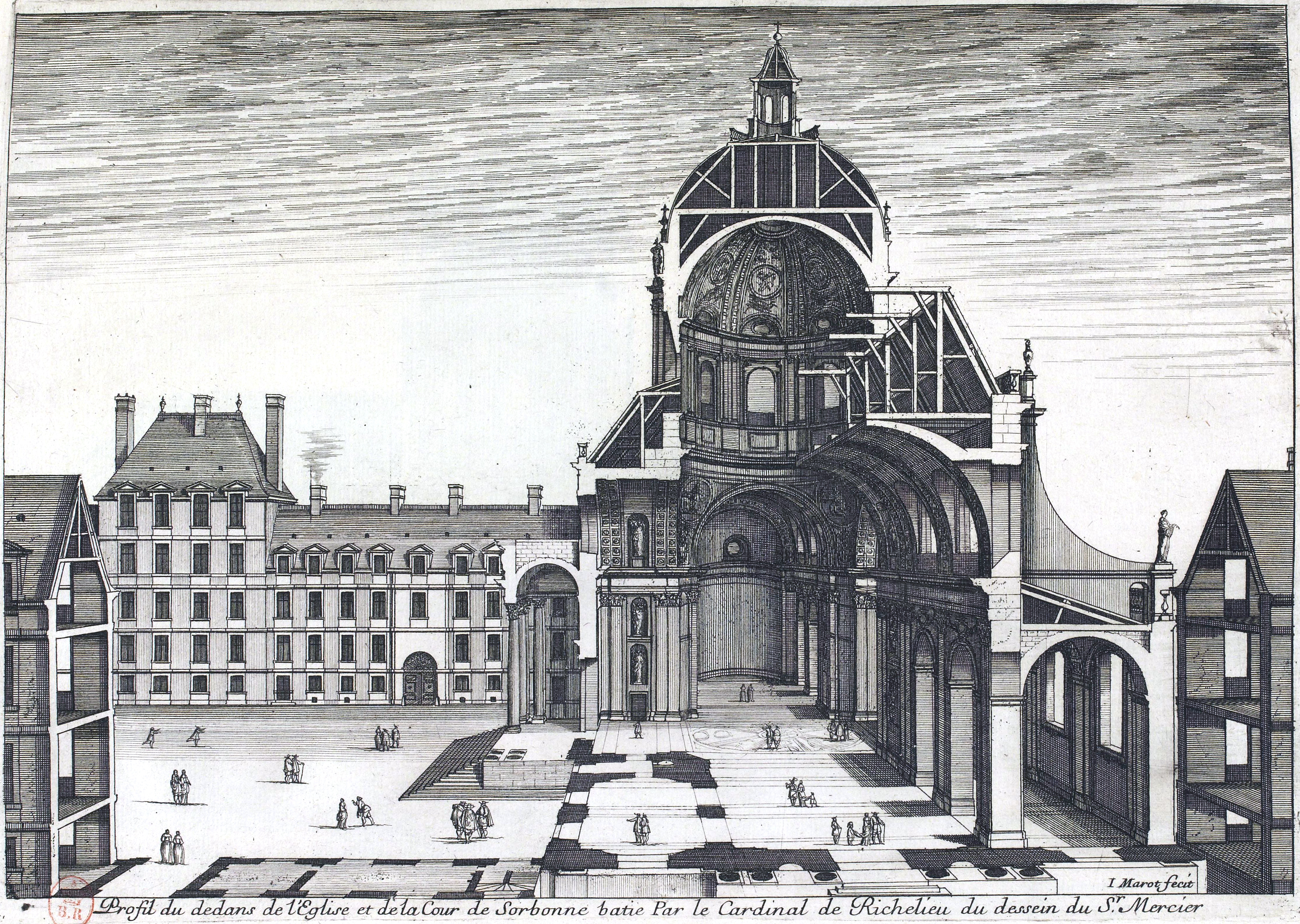
Cross section

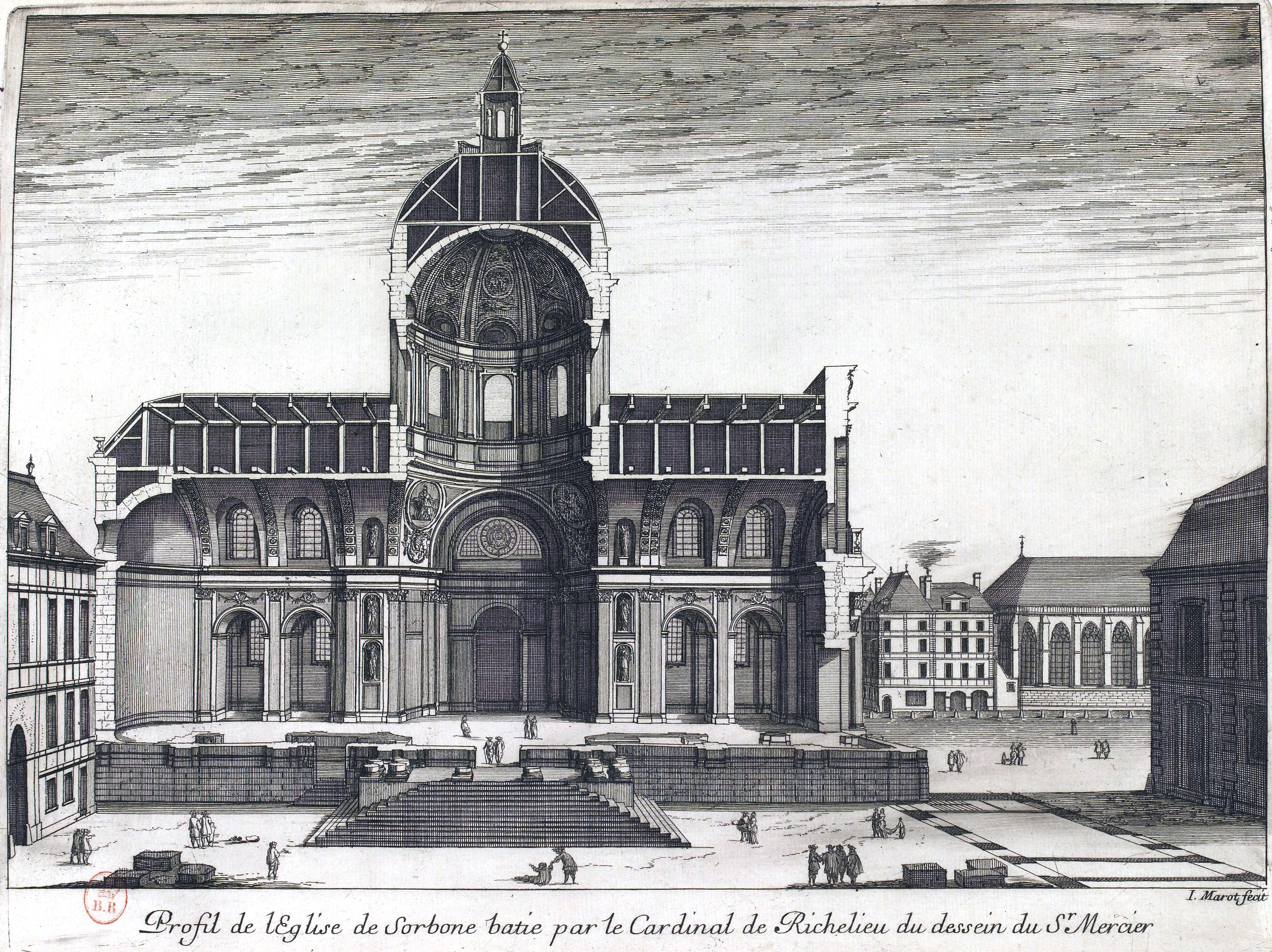
Cross section, viewed from the north

== Exterior: the façades and dome ==
The plan of the church displayed a combination of two different types of buildings. The west façade, facing the Place de la Sorbonne, broke from the traditional Gothic three levels and followed the style of the Counter-Reformation, with two superimposed orders: Corinthian columns on the lower level and Composite pilasters on the upper level.

The north façade faces the court of honour, the central courtyard of the college. It is the original façade, and takes the form of a classical portico with Corinthian columns and an entablature inspired by the Pantheon in Rome.

The chapel's dome was the first in Paris to adopt the classical Roman form of a cupola topped by a lantern. It was soon imitated in Paris by the chapel of Val-de-Grâce and on an even larger scale by the royal church of Les Invalides.

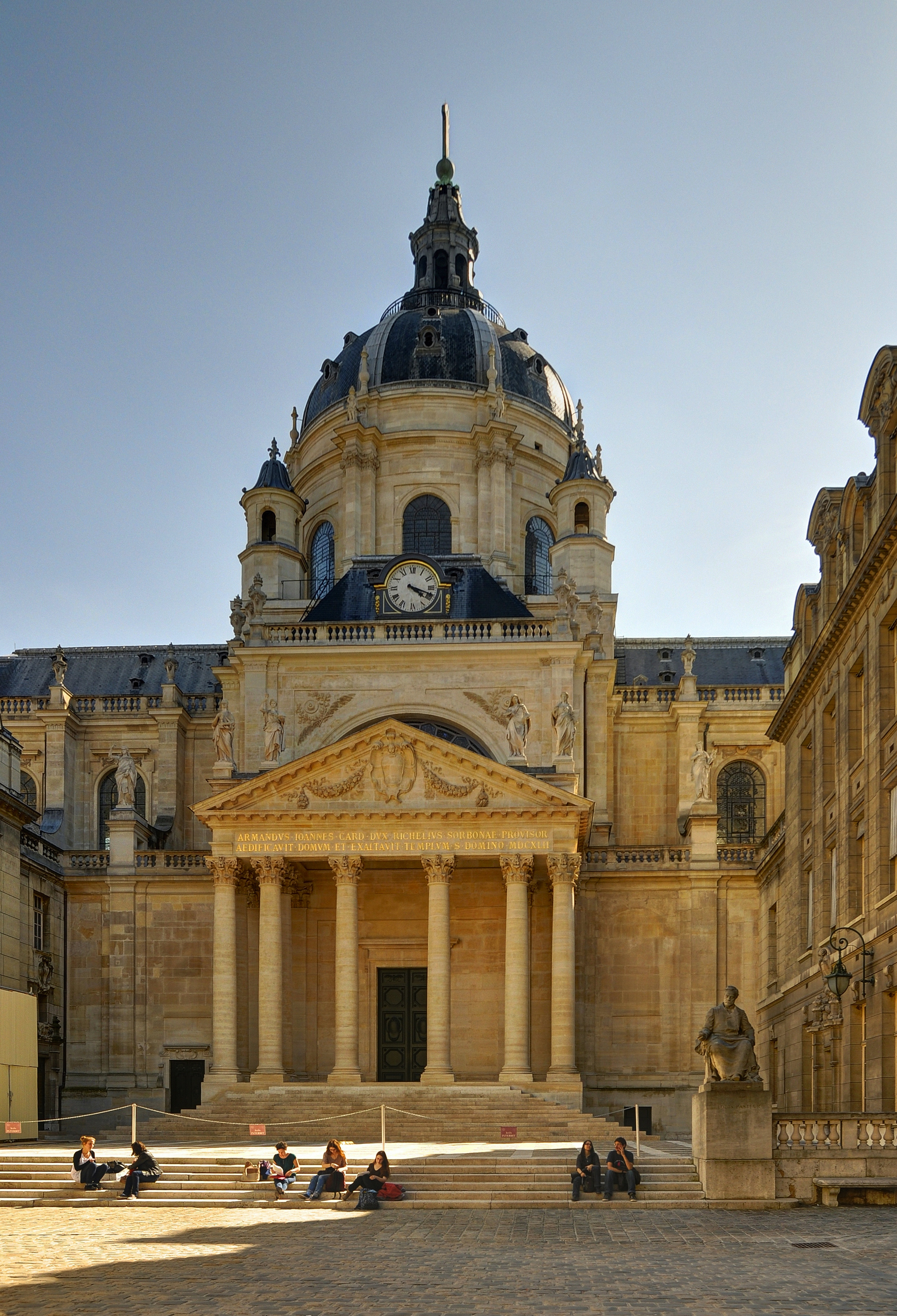
North façade from the court of honour

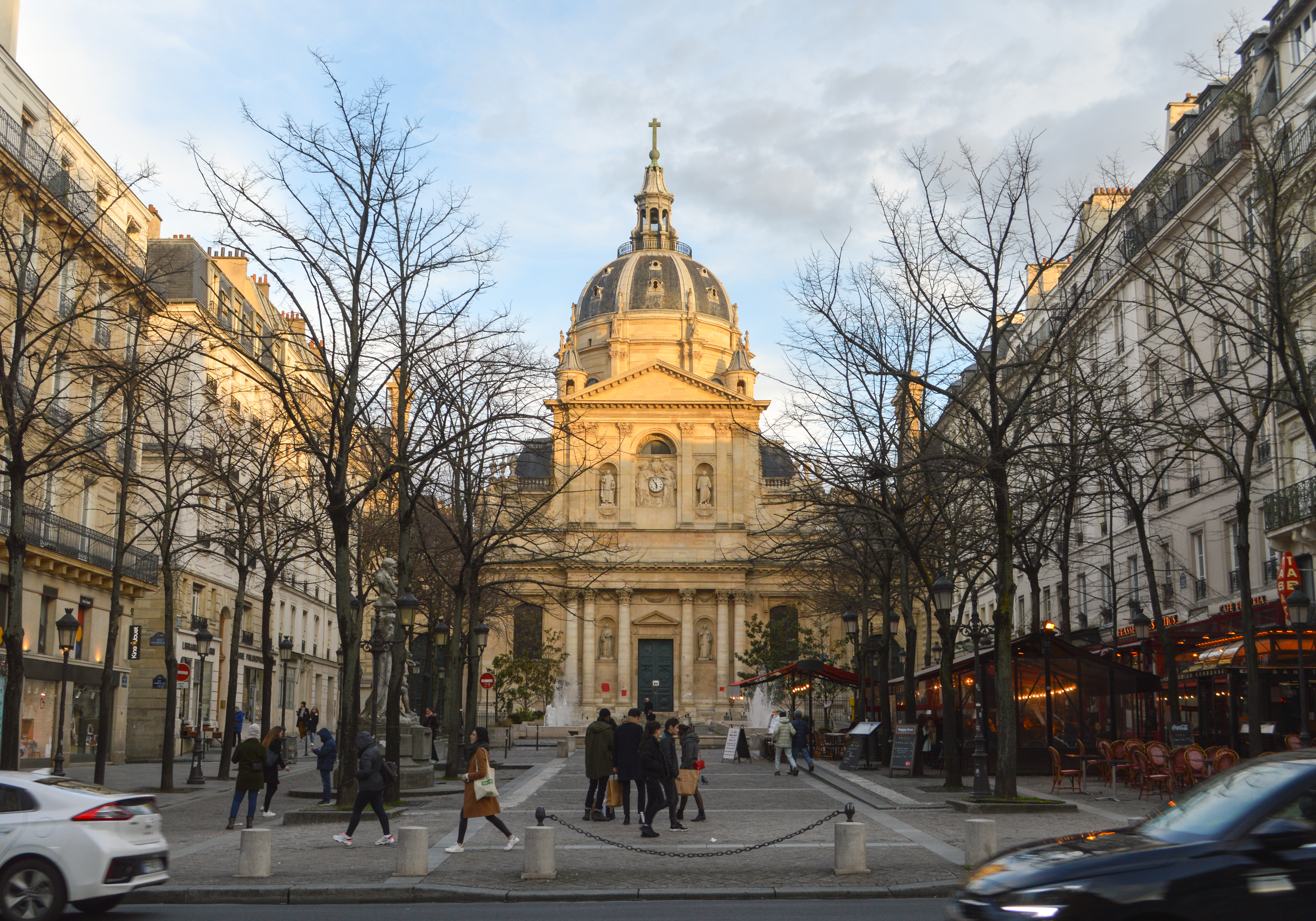
The west façade and the Place de la Sorbonne

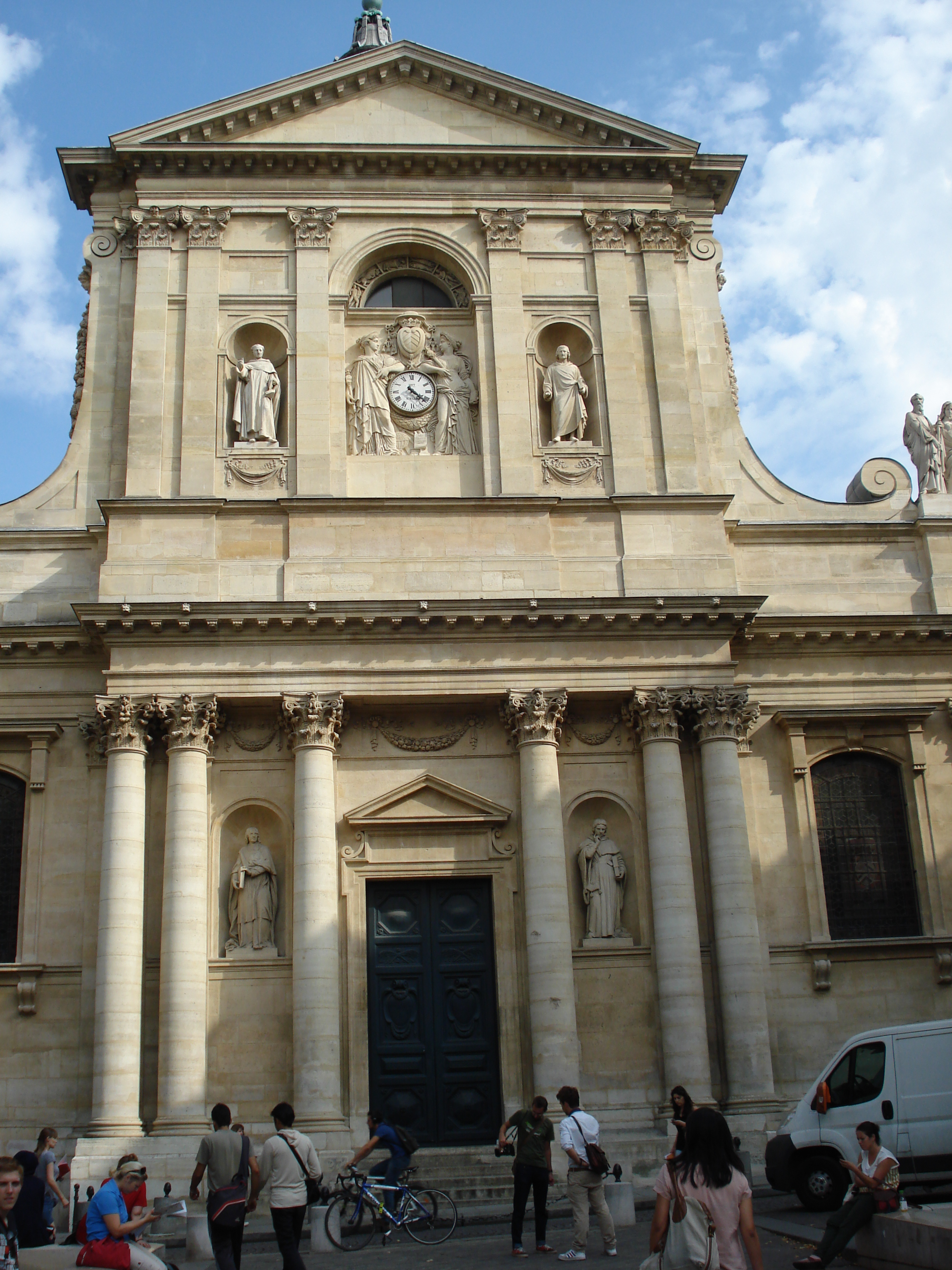
West façade

== Interior ==
The dome over the transept divides the interior of the church into two equally sized parts, the nave and choir. They are bordered by lateral chapels. Most of the interior art and decoration dates to the 17th century.

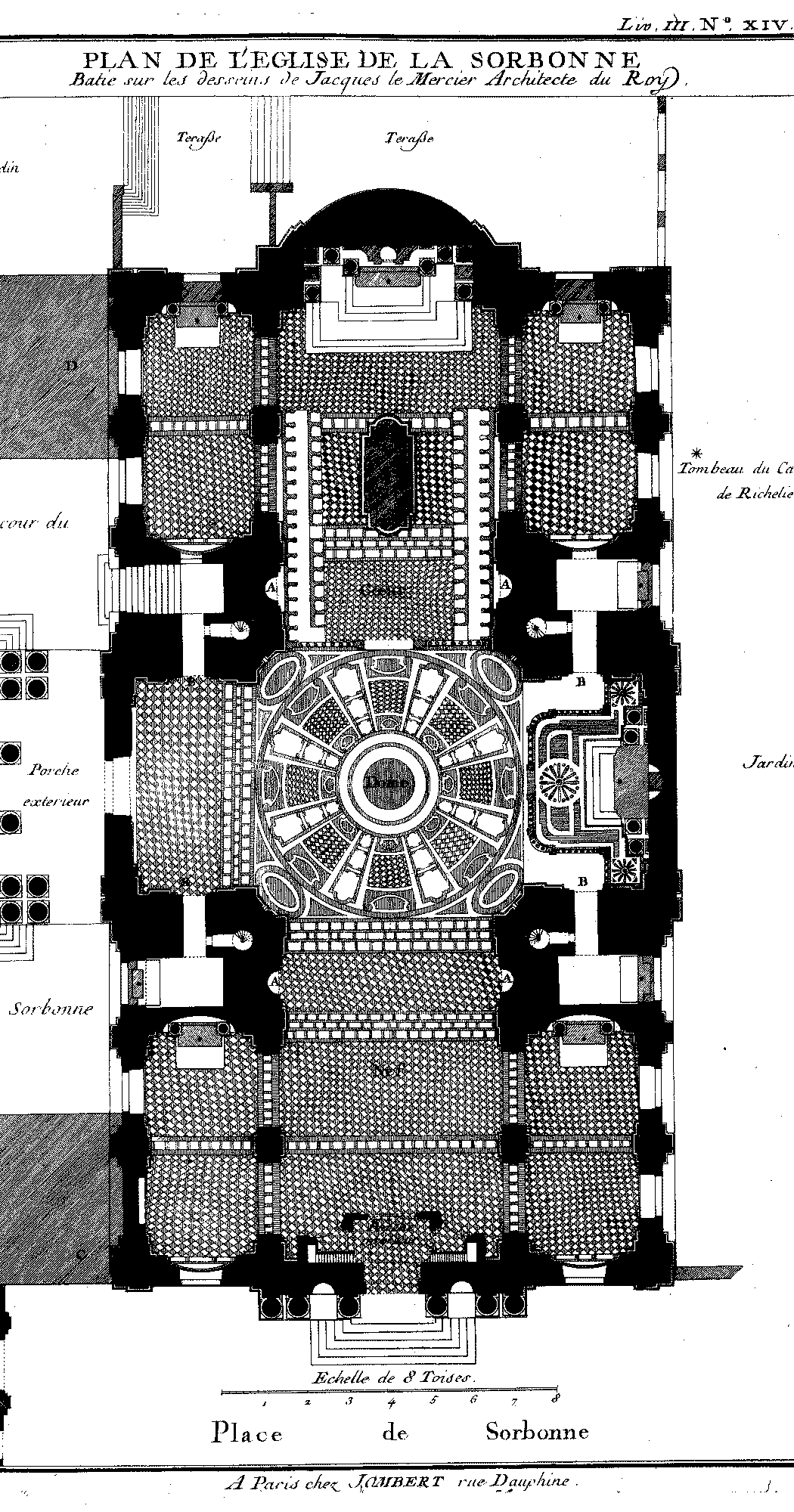
Plan of the chapel, with the altar at centre-right and the choir and Richelieu's tomb at the top

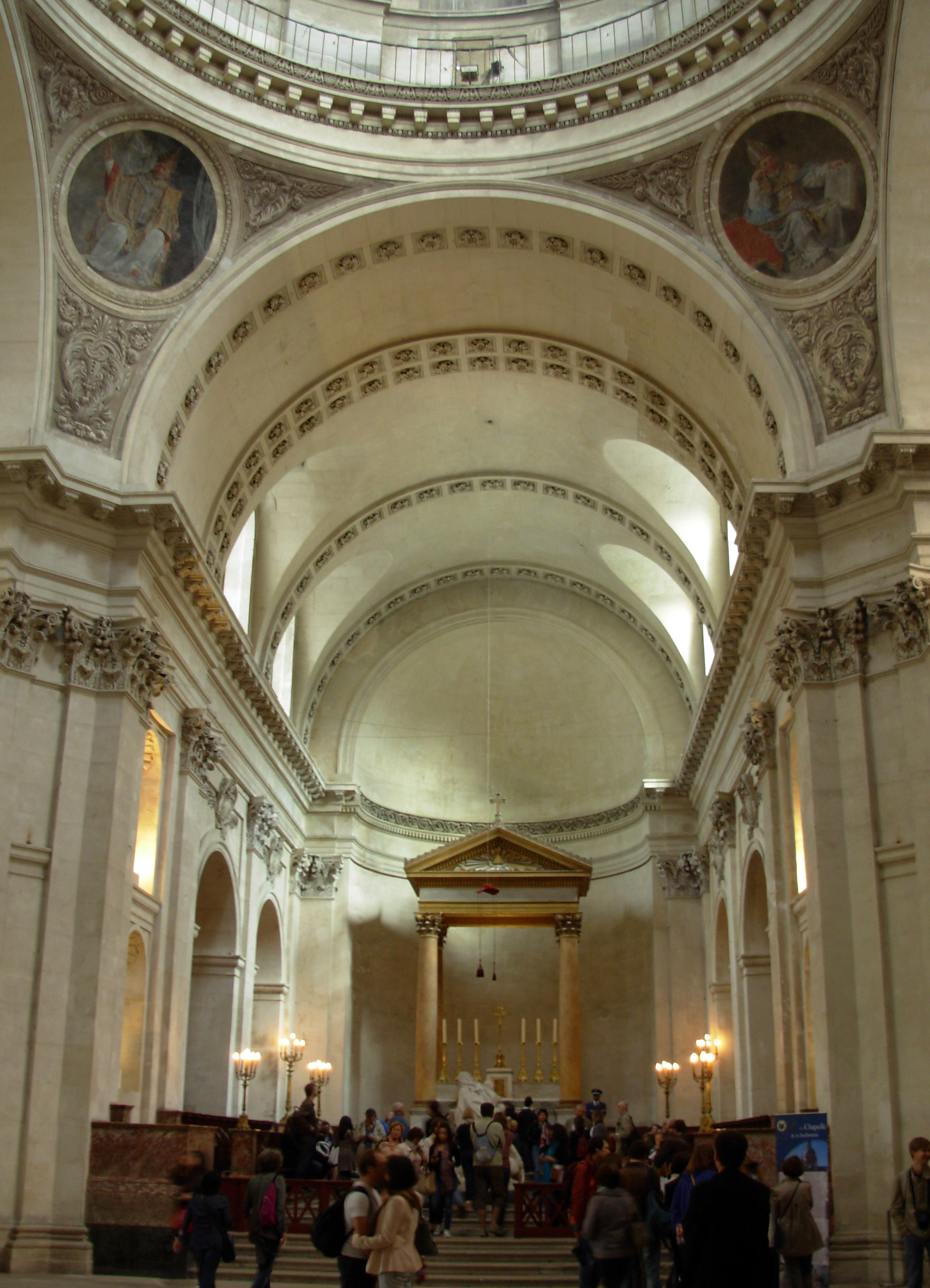
The choir, with the tomb of Cardinal Richelieu in the chapel at the far end

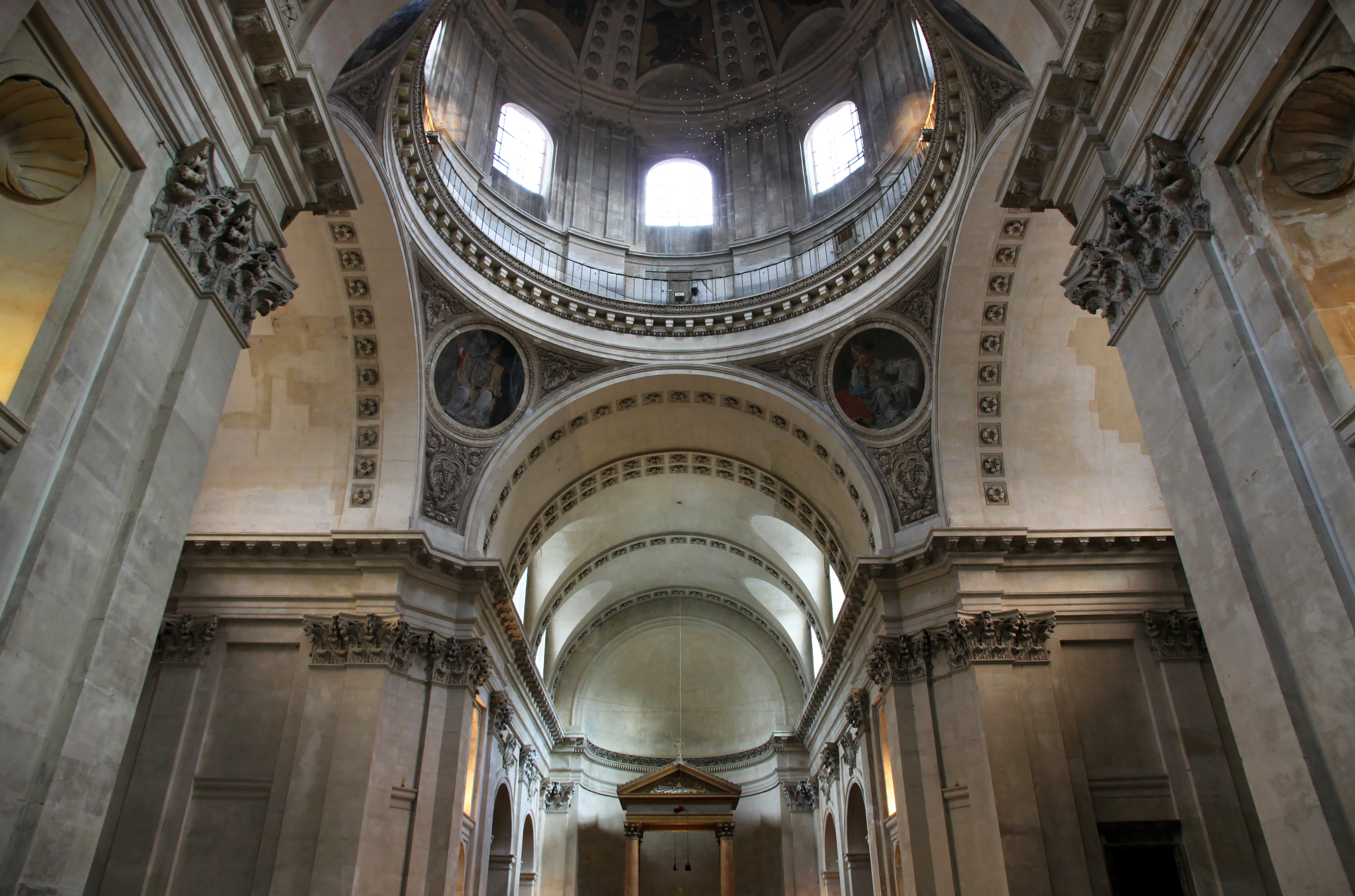
Ceiling and dome of the chapel

=== Tomb of Cardinal Richelieu ===
The tomb of Cardinal Richelieu, made of Carrara marble, is an emblematic work of 17th-century French sculpture. It was made by François Girardon (1628–1715), and was not completed until 1694, 52 years after Richelieu's death. It is placed in an open space, with the cardinal in his ceremonial robes, reclining and gazing toward the altar. Richelieu is accompanied by two allegorical figures. Behind him, the figure of Faith (or Religion) supports his upper body in a composition recalling a Pietà, while the figure of Doctrine (or Science) mourns at his feet.

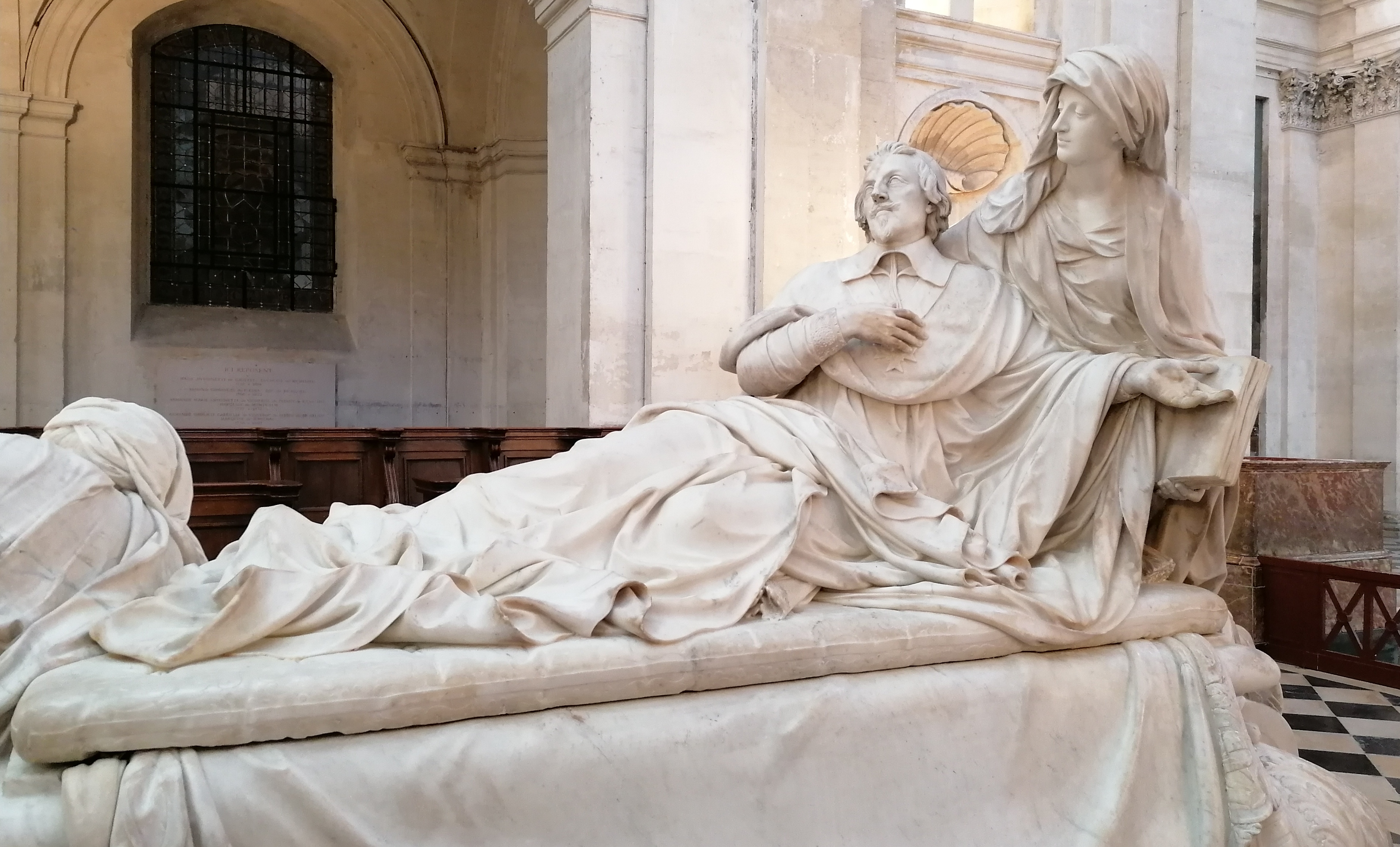
Tomb of Cardinal Richelieu with the smiling figure symbolizing Faith

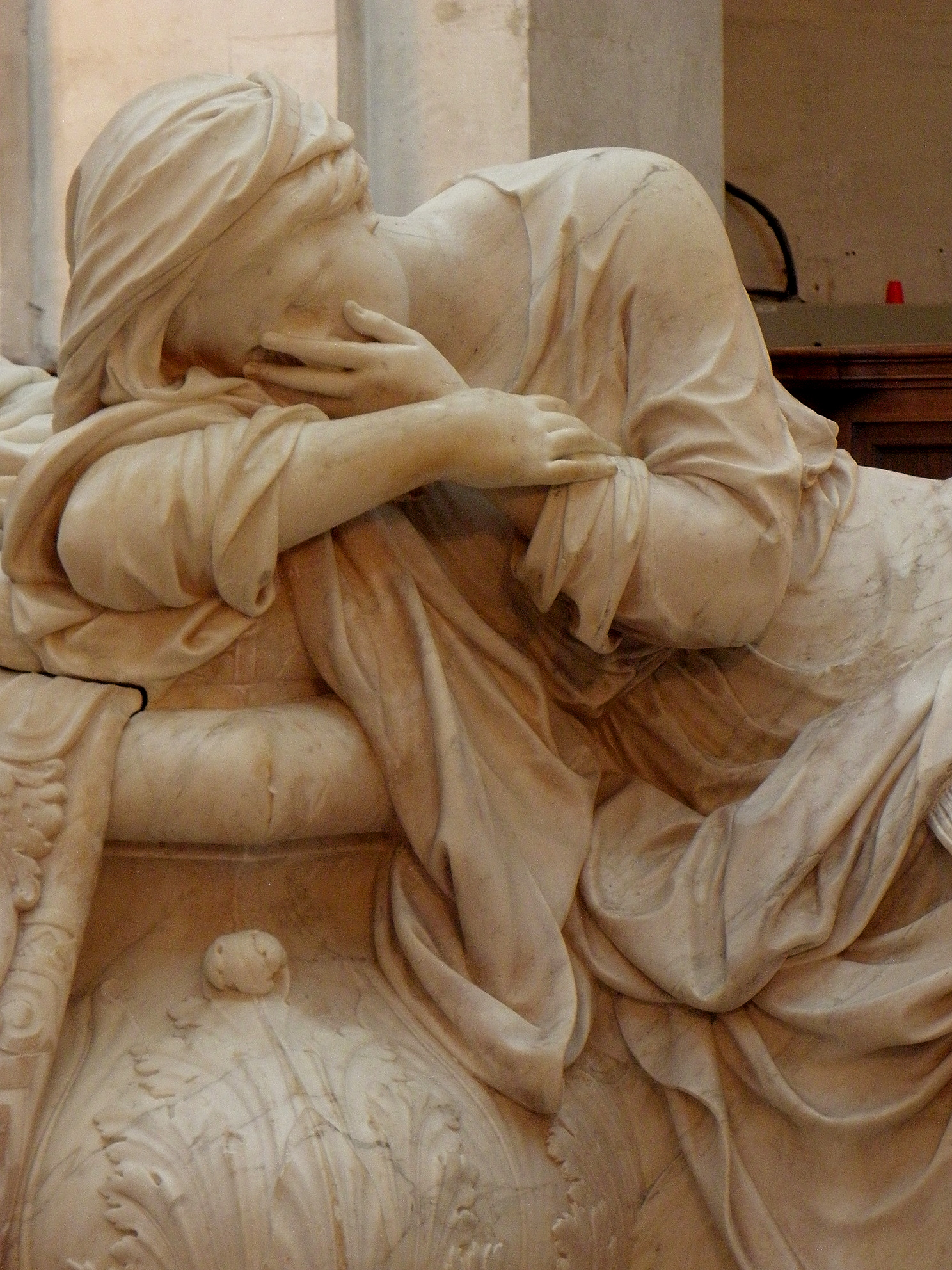
Grieving figure symbolizing Doctrine

== Art and decoration ==
The cupola inside the dome is decorated with a group of four mural paintings by Philippe de Champaigne (1602–1674). Painted between 1641 and 1644, they depict the four great Latin Fathers of the Church: Saint Gregory, Saint Ambrose, Saint Augustine and Saint Jerome.

Much of the art and decoration in the chapel was added in the 19th century. The largest painting, Theology, is located in the right arm of the transept. It was painted by Louis-Charles Timbal (1821–1880) and depicts a theologian reading a religious text before an altar, surrounded by figures representing prominent theologians and clerics from antiquity to the 19th century. Timbal painted a series of works depicting prominent saints and angels around the choir.

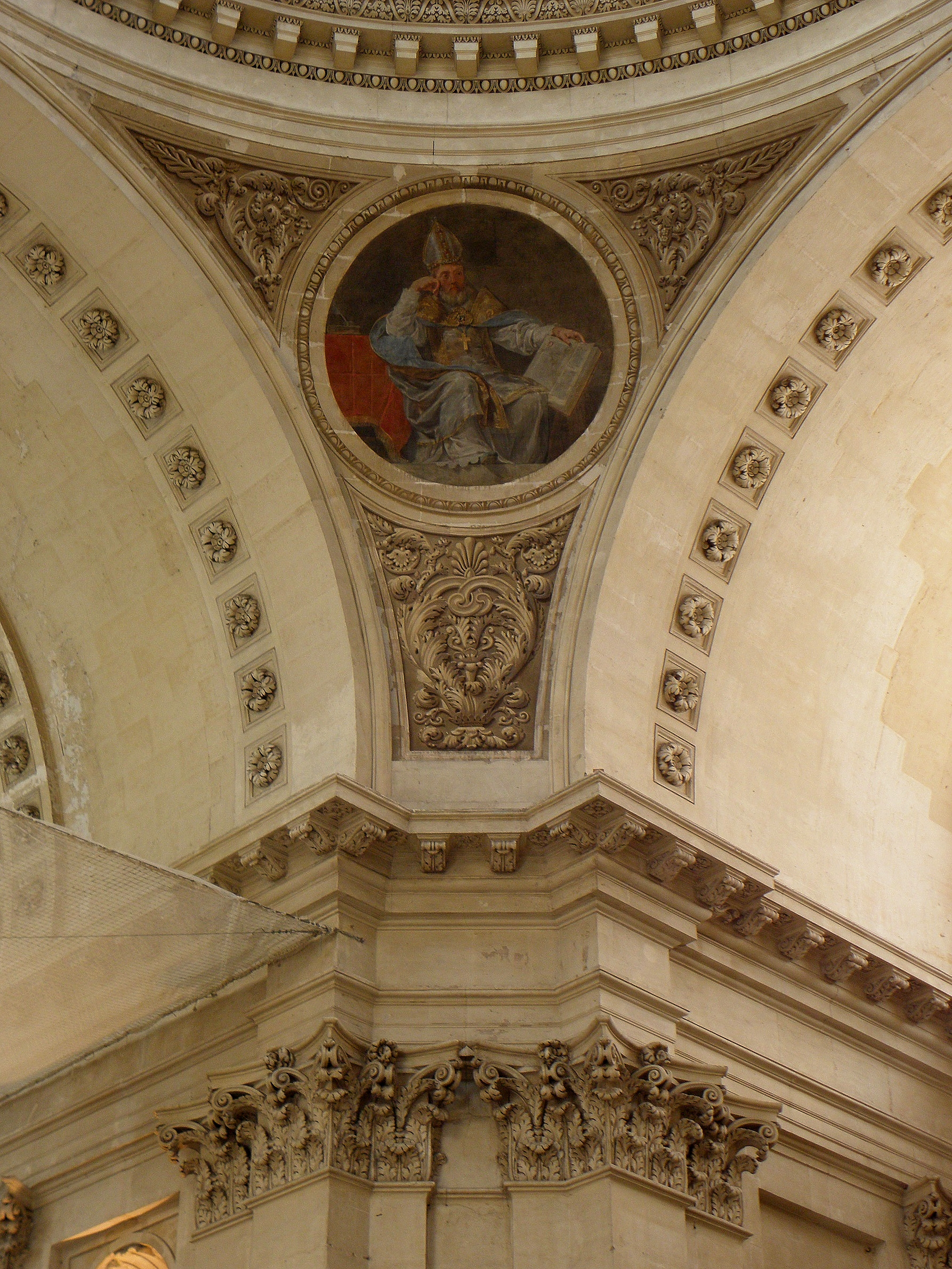
Saint Ambrose, fresco below the dome by Philippe de Champaigne

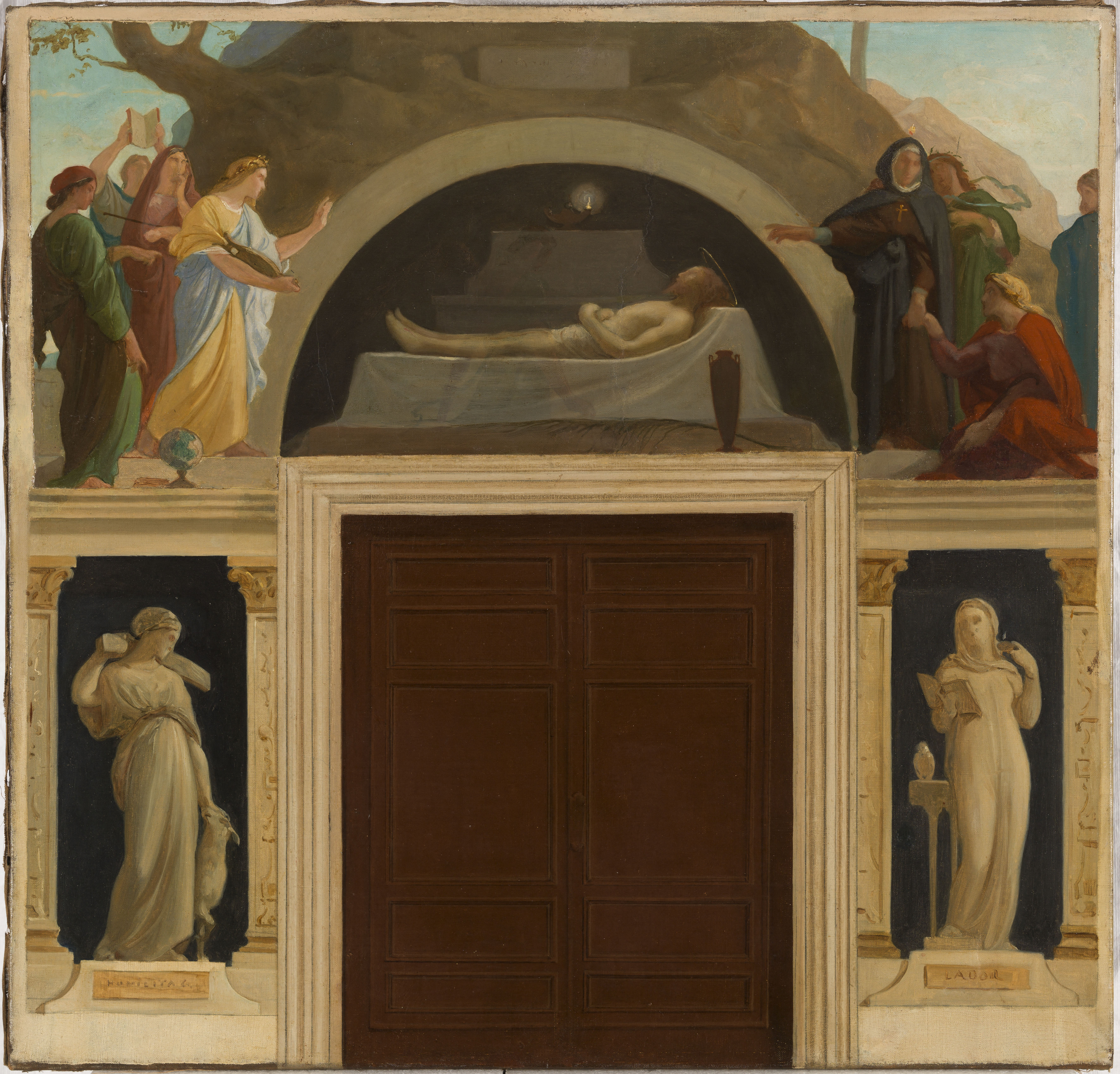
Christ at the Tomb by Louis-Charles Timbal
