= Chancellery of the Universities of Paris =

French Ministry of Higher Education unit

- Chancellerie des Universités de Paris
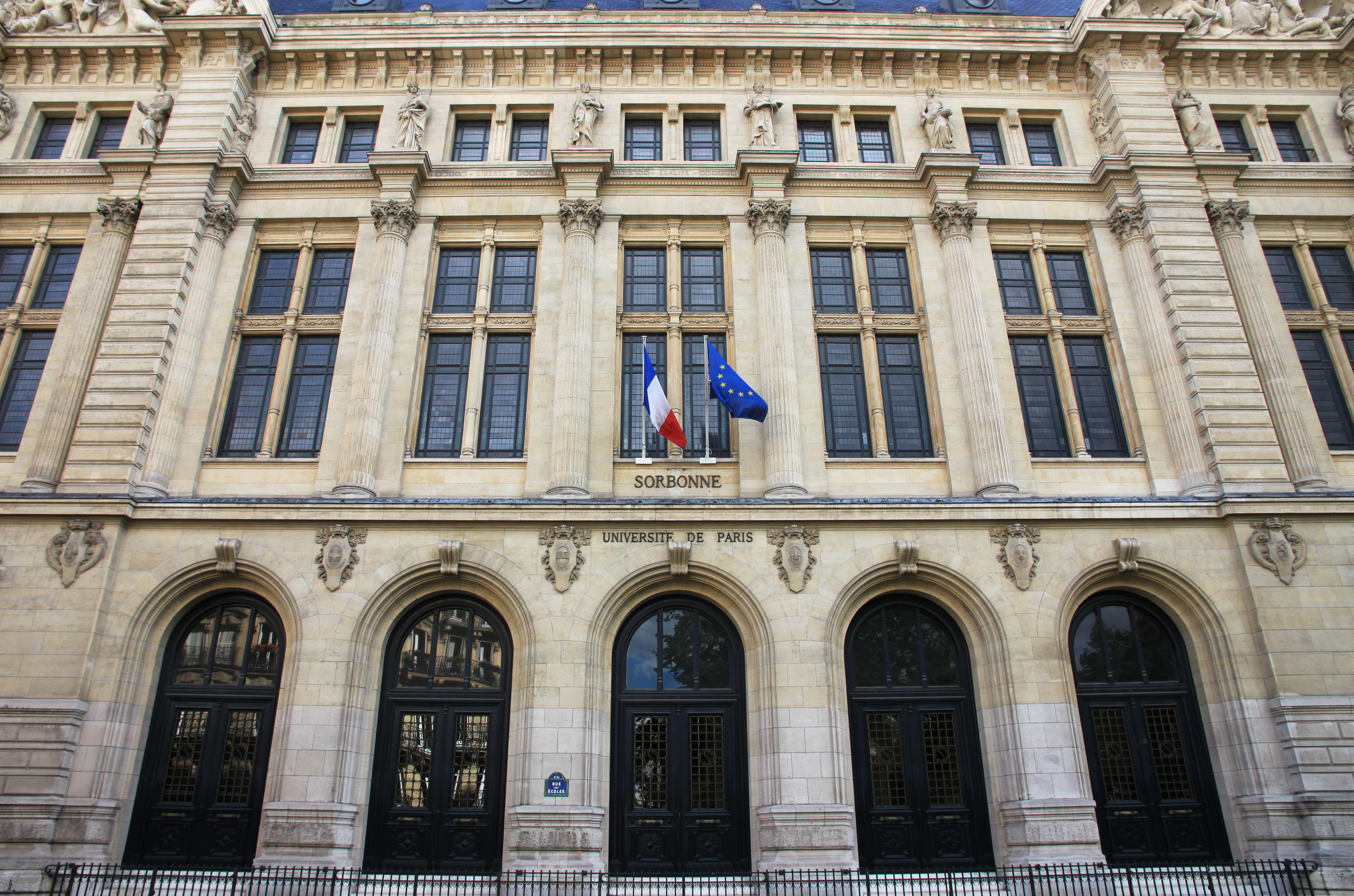
- Entrance to the Chancellery Academic Palace, on the rue des Écoles side of the Sorbonne.
- Other names: La Sorbonne, the Universities of Paris
- Motto: Hic et ubique terrarum (Latin)
- Motto in English: Here and anywhere on Earth
- Type: Public university system
- Established: 1215; 811 years ago, 1971; 55 years ago
- Parent institution: Ministry of Higher Education
- Chancellor: Bernard Beignier
- Vice-Chancellor: Isabelle Prat
- Secretary General: Alexandre Bosch
- Students: 300,000
- Location: Sorbonne, 47 rue des Écoles, Paris, France; 48.848611°N 2.343611°E
- Campus: Urban
- Sporting affiliations: Paris Université Club
- Website: www.sorbonne.fr

The Chancellerie des Universités de Paris (French pronunciation: [ʃɑ̃sɛlʁi dez‿ynivɛʁsite də paʁi], "Chancellery of the Universities of Paris") is the public institution under the French Ministry of Higher Education that inherited the administration of the assets of the University of Paris, which was split into thirteen autonomous universities in 1971. It administers the Sorbonne, the Villa Finaly in Italy, the Château de Ferrières (until 2012), the Domaine de Richelieu in Indre-et-Loire, the Jacques Doucet Library and other assets bequeathed to the former University of Paris. The chancellery also represents the eleven universities that own the Cité internationale universitaire de Paris. The Sorbonne building and The Sorbonne brand name are owned by the chancellery. It also manages the official store of the Sorbonne and the universities of Paris.

The chancellery was created in 1971 after the Faure law of 1968, which dismembered the University of Paris, at the same time as the university chancelleries in the other academies. Since 2021, it has been the only remaining chancellery in France, the others having been dissolved.

Its headquarters are located at the Sorbonne, which it administers on behalf of the universities Paris 1 Panthéon-Sorbonne, Sorbonne University and Sorbonne Nouvelle.

== Mission ==
In France, the Chancellor (chancelier) is one of the titles of the Rector (recteur), a senior civil servant of the Ministry of Education serving as manager of a regional educational district (académie). In his capacity as Chancellor, the Rector awards national academic degrees to the university's graduates, oversees the legality of the universities' executive acts and channels funding from the ministry. The Rector-Chancellor has no executive function in any university but remains a member ex officio of the board of every public university in his district. The Rector-Chancellor is the guarantor of the proper application of the French government's policy for universities and Grandes Ecoles in the Education Authority of Paris (Académie de Paris). In this capacity, he chairs or sits on various university boards of directors.

From 1824 to 1920, the Minister of Public Education, Grand Maître of the University of Paris, was the Rector of the Education Authority of Paris. He was assisted in this role by a Vice-Rector, who was chairman of the board of the University of Paris. Since 1920, the Rector is no longer the Minister, but is independent.

When the University of Paris split in 1971, the Rector of the Education Authority, Grand Maître of the University of Paris, became Chancellor of the Universities and Grandes Écoles of Paris.

The chancellery (as an institution) assists the Rector-Chancellor in managing the various universities in Paris. It is responsible for a posteriori control of the actions of Parisian universities, as well as those of the Paris inter-university libraries, particularly with regard to state investments. Following the transition to autonomy for Parisian universities and Grandes Écoles, which relinquished responsibility for managing university staff, its main day-to-day mission is to manage the property of Parisian universities, in particular their joint and undivided assets.

Because of the special situation of the Île-de-France region, the Chancellerie des Universités de Paris has a jurisdiction that can extend beyond the city of Paris alone, to encompass the region's seventeen universities in certain cases. The Minister responsible may also, by decree, entrust the Chancellery with the management of the assets of other Grandes Écoles and universities, which constitutes an exception to the rule.

The thirteen universities of Paris, now numbering eleven after mergers:

- Paris 1 Panthéon-Sorbonne University, also known as Sorbonne or Paris 1;
- Panthéon-Assas University Paris, or Assas Université;
- Sorbonne Nouvelle University, or Paris 3;
- Sorbonne University, also known as Sorbonne or Paris 4, Paris 6 or UPMC;
- Paris Cité University, also known as Descartes, or Paris 5 and Paris 7;
- Paris 8 University Vincennes-Saint-Denis, or Paris 8;
- Paris Dauphine University, also known as Dauphine, and formerly Paris 9, a constituent college of PSL University;
- Paris Nanterre University, also known as Paris West, or Paris 10;
- Paris-Saclay University, also known as Saclay, Orsay, or Paris-Sud and Paris 11;
- Paris-East Créteil University, or UPEC and Paris 12;
- Sorbonne Paris North University, or Paris 13.

There are also 17 Grandes Écoles under the authority of the Chancellerie des Universités de Paris, some of which were colleges of the University of Paris before it split in 1971:

- former colleges of the University of Paris:
  - École Normale Supérieure (at the University of Paris from 1903 to 1954), now part of PSL University;
  - Institut d'Etudes Politiques de Paris (at the University of Paris from 1945 to 1970);
  - Institut national des langues et civilisations orientales, formerly the École nationale des langues orientales vivantes of the University of Paris;
  - Institut de Physique du Globe de Paris, now part of Paris Cité University;
- other Grandes Écoles in Paris:
  - Collège de France, now part of PSL University;
  - Conservatoire national des arts et métiers (its Aerotechnical Institute was a college of the University of Paris);
  - École Centrale Paris, now CentraleSupélec, part of Paris-Saclay University;
  - École des Hautes Etudes en Sciences Sociales;
  - École Nationale des Chartes, now part of PSL University;
  - École Nationale Supérieure des Arts et Métiers;
  - École Pratique des Hautes Etudes, now part of PSL University;
  - Observatoire de Paris, now part of PSL University;
  - Muséum National d'Histoire Naturelle (it inherited part of the Institute of Ethnology at the University of Paris), now part of Sorbonne University;
  - Institut National d'Histoire de l'Art (its library was part of the University of Paris);
  - École normale supérieure Paris-Saclay, now part of Paris-Saclay University.

== Location ==
=== The Palais Académique in the Sorbonne ===
By royal decree of 16 May 1821, the headquarters of the rectorate of the Académie de Paris was established in perpetuity on the premises of the Sorbonne. When the Sorbonne was rebuilt at the end of the 19th century, the rector-chancellor was given luxurious premises in the north of the building, known as the Palais Académique (English: the Academic Palace). Since its creation following the dismemberment of the University of Paris, the chancellery's services have occupied the entire Sorbonne's Palais Académique, offices in various other parts of the building, and numerous other buildings in the city of Paris. The chancellery regularly uses the Sorbonne Grand Amphithéâtre for events, official ceremonies and awards ceremonies.

=== List of inter-university centres and campuses shared by Paris universities ===
- on the Latin Quarter campus:
  - the Sorbonne (since 1253): shared by Sorbonne University, Paris 1 Panthéon-Sorbonne University and Sorbonne Nouvelle University;
  - the Panthéon Centre (since 1771): shared by Paris 1 Panthéon-Sorbonne University and Panthéon-Assas University Paris;
  - the Cordeliers Convent (since 1217): shared by Sorbonne University and Paris Cité University;
- the Cité Internationale Universitaire de Paris (since 1925): shared by all of the eleven universities of Paris;
- the Michelet Centre (since 1928): shared by Sorbonne University and Paris 1 Panthéon-Sorbonne University;
- the Condorcet Campus (since 2019): shared by Paris 1 Panthéon-Sorbonne University, Sorbonne Nouvelle University, Paris 8 University Vincennes-Saint-Denis, Paris Nanterre University and Sorbonne Paris North University;

Former shared campuses:

- the Jussieu Campus: shared by Pierre and Marie Curie University and Paris Diderot University until 2006, now a campus of Sorbonne University.

== Gallery ==
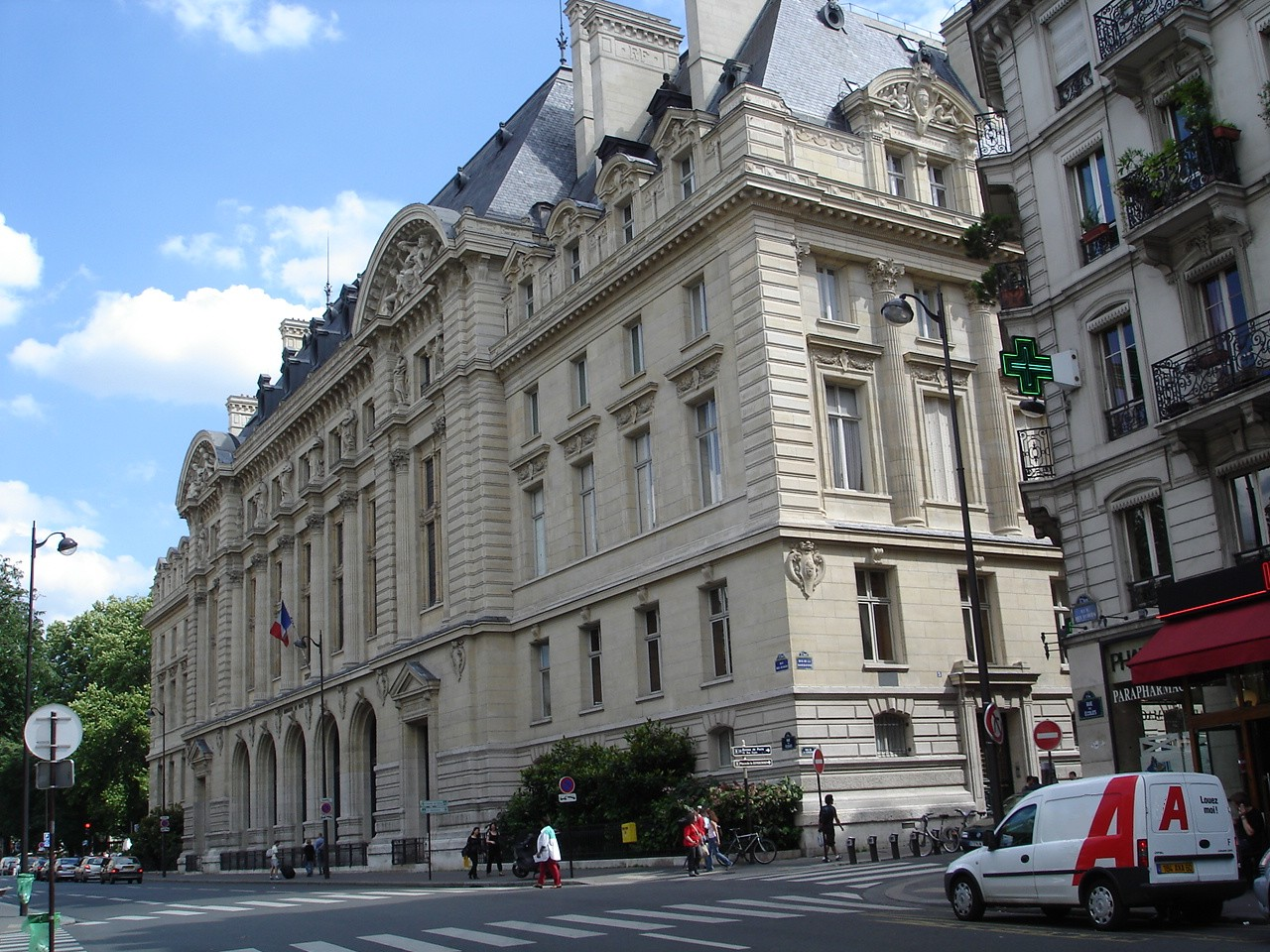
The Sorbonne, rue des Écoles side, headquarters of the chancellery.

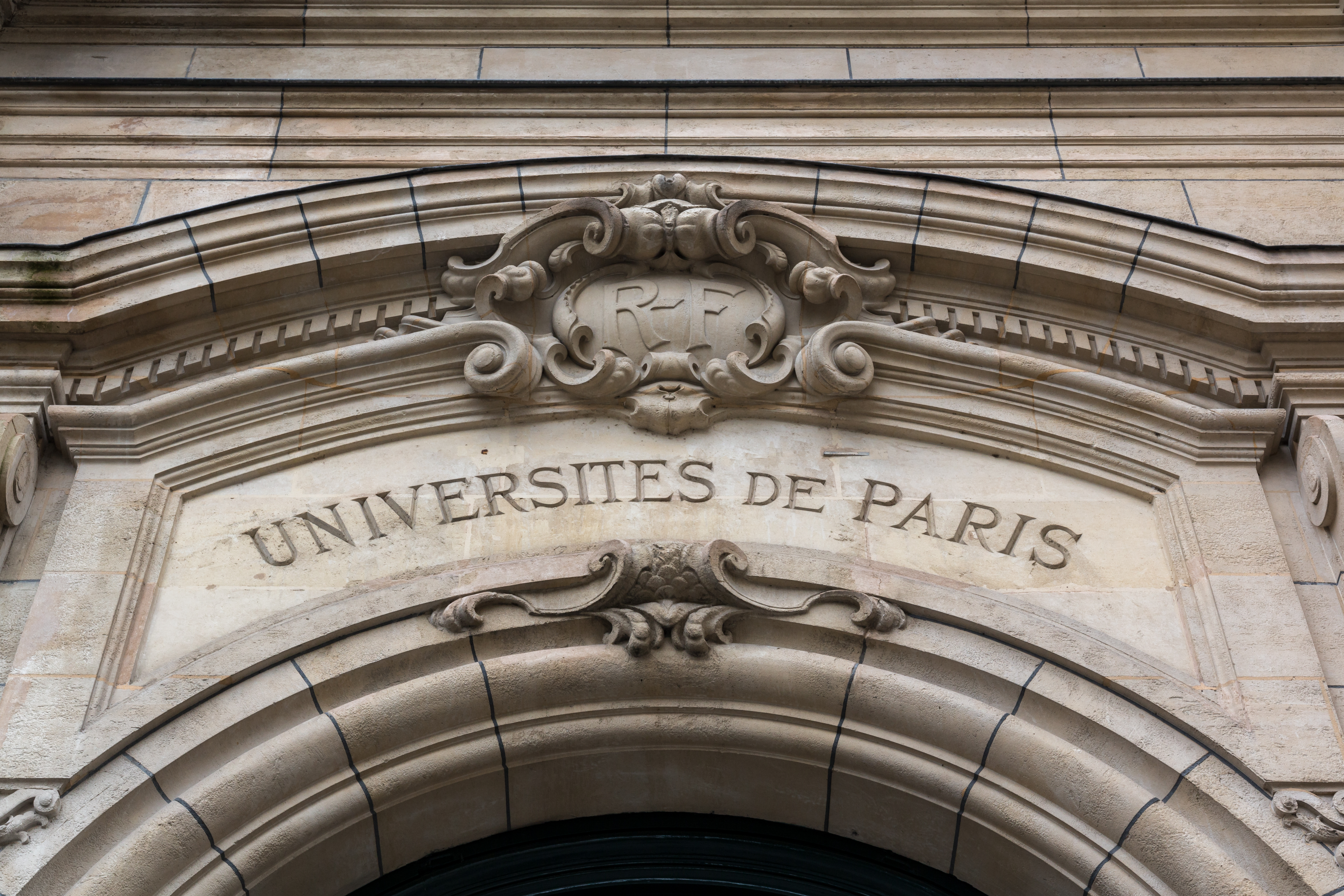
The "Universities of Paris" inscription on the Sorbonne's Chapelle Sainte-Ursule.

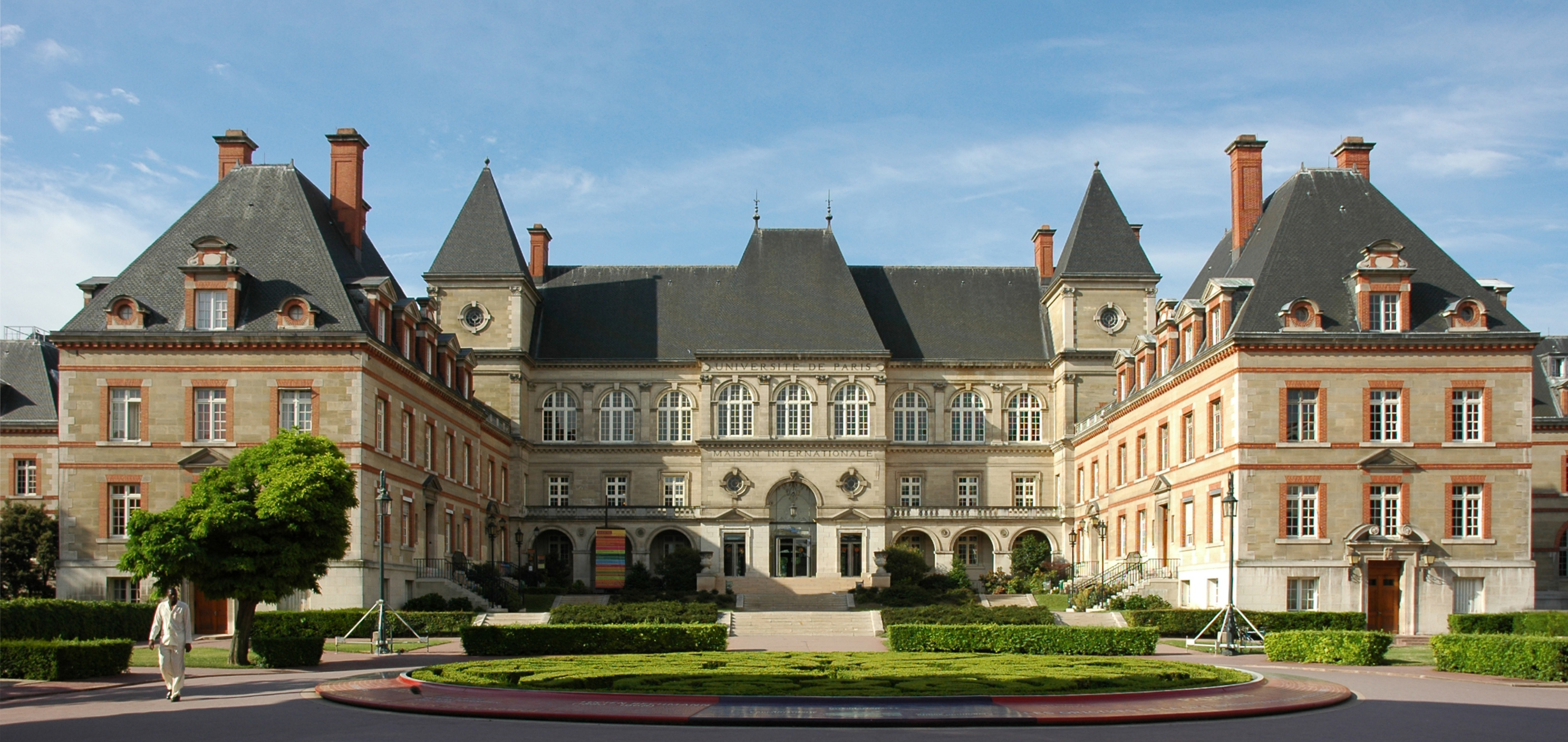
The Maison internationale of the Cité universitaire.

== See also ==
=== Further reading ===
- Caroline Chamard-Heim (2014). "La Chancellerie des universités de Paris". La Semaine juridique – Administrations et collectivités territoriales. LexisNexis: 4.
- Marie-Claude Delmas (2016), "De l'Université de Paris à la chancellerie des universités de Paris : Le rôle de Pierre Bartoli, 1951–1978", dans Florence Bourillon, Éléonore Marantz, Stéphanie Méchine and Loïc Vadelorge, De l'Université de Paris aux universités d'Île-de-France, Rennes, Presses Universitaires de Rennes, coll. "Histoire", 353 p. (ISBN 978-2-7535-4291-4), p. 123–141

=== External links ===
- Official website
