= Société des amis des universités de Paris =

Société des Amis des Universités de Paris (SAUP)
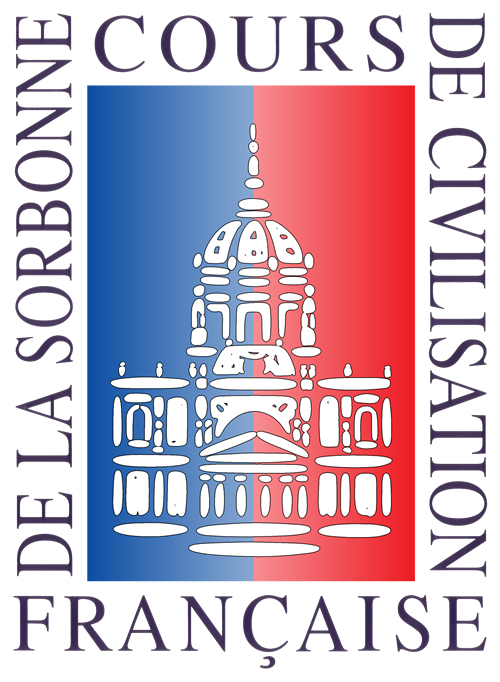
- Paris; France

Information
- Type: non-profit association
- Established: 1899
- President: Jean-Louis Boursin

The Société des Amis des Universités de Paris (SAUP; English: the Society of Friends of the Universities of Paris) is a public utility and non-profit association of private status regulated by the French law of 1901 on associations. It has been founded in 1899 for social and humanitarian purposes.

has been chaired by several notable figures, including Jean-Casimir Perier and Raymond Poincaré (former French Presidents), René Cassin (Nobel peace prize-winner), members of the Institute and other scholars.

It is currently presided by Chief Education Officer Jean-Louis Boursin, Professor at the Institut d’Etudes Politiques de Paris, and former president of the Conference of Chief Education Officers. The two Vice Chairmen are Professor Jean Mesnard, a member of the Institut, and Professor Jean-Robert Pitte, President of the Paris-Sorbonne University (Paris IV). According to its statutes, the first Vice-President of the SAUP is the Rector-Chancellor of the Paris University.

This association, intended to develop the French culture around the world, created in 1919 the Cours de Civilisation Française de la Sorbonne, a French as a foreign language school which provides French language and civilisation classes for foreigners.

Recently, the SAUP has created two other programs:

- Sorbonne dans la Ville, a series of lectures given by professors of Paris University for the general public.
- The FLE Français langue étrangère Collection, performed by the major academic publisher Belin, whose two first books were published in 2007.

The Société des Amis des Universités de Paris was dissolved in 2009 to be erected Foundation of Public Utility, the Foundation Robert de Sorbon.
