= Cours de civilisation française de la Sorbonne =

Cours de Civilisation Française de la Sorbonne

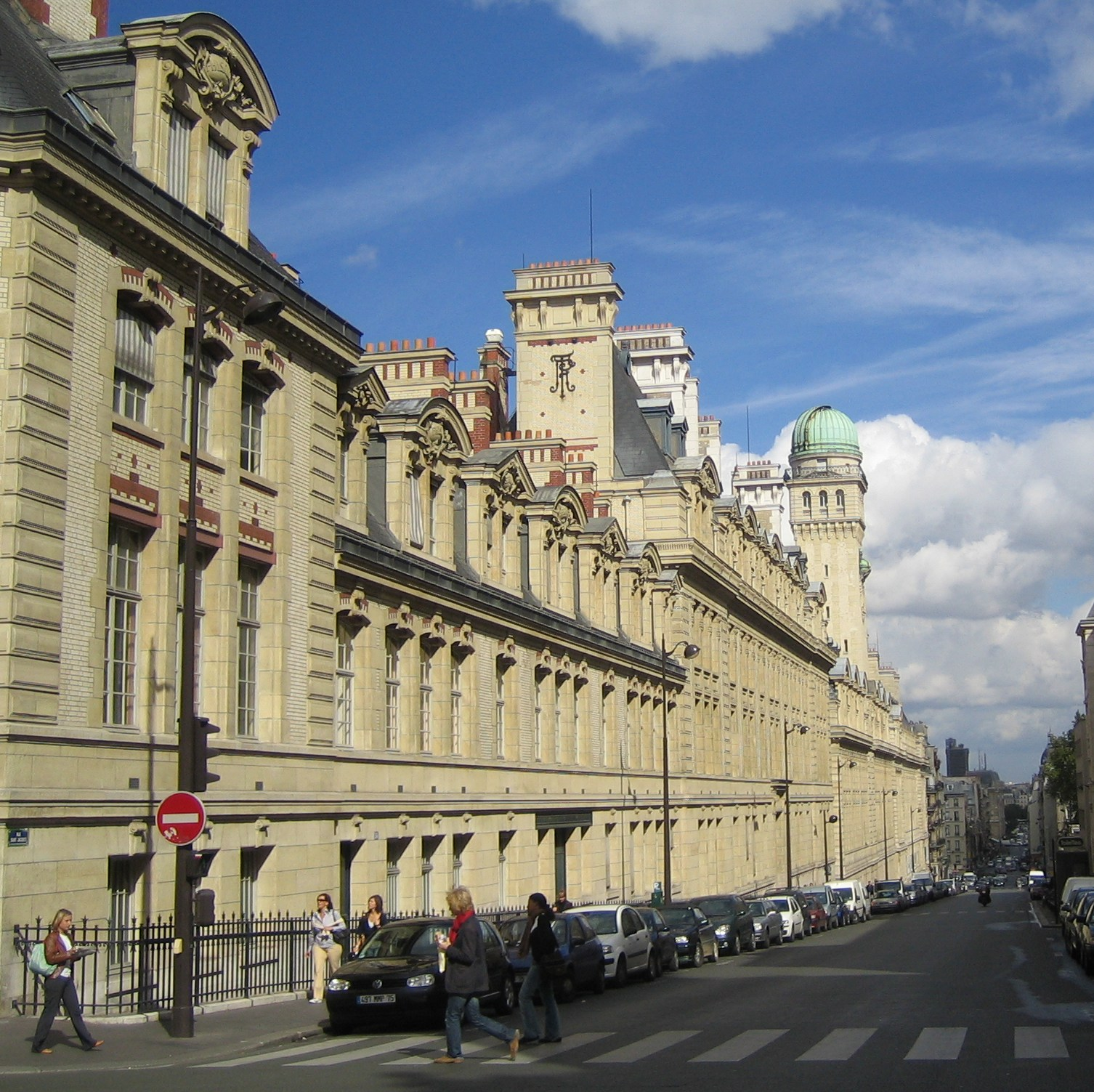
- Cours de Civilisation Française de la Sorbonne

Location
- 16-22, rue de Martignac, 75007 Paris; France
- Coordinates: 48.840868°N 2.329763°E

Information
- Type: Private school
- Established: 1919
- President: Édouard Husson
- Director: Bernard FRANCO
- Enrollment: 7000
- Website: ccfs-sorbonne.fr

The Cours de Civilisation Française de la Sorbonne (CCFS) is a private French civilisation and language institution founded in Paris in 1919 with the goal of contributing to peace between peoples by supporting international student exchanges.

It is certified to teach French as a foreign language (français langue étrangère). The CCFS welcomes nearly 160 nationalities. About 5,000 students attend the institution each year.

== Teachings ==
The CCFS provides French courses for students of all levels, from complete beginners to those who seek to become a professor of French as a foreign language. These courses prepare students to pass various national and international exams such as the TCF or DELF, or to obtain the school's own certificates.

=== French language and civilization courses ===
Various kinds of courses are proposed according to the student's needs. These include:

- French language classes (grammar, conjugation, spelling, vocabulary, phonetics, approach to literary texts, written and oral expression).
- French civilisation taught in lectures or in small groups.

=== Specialised Modules ===
The CCFS also prepares students to obtain the diplomas issued by the Minister of National Education that certify the French skills of non-native speakers. Some of these tests are required to study at French universities. Exams that the CCFS coursework prepares students for includes:

- the TCF, TCF-SO (digital TCF) and the TCF-DAP (French knowledge test - Preliminary Admission Application);
- the DELF (Diploma in French language studies);
- the DALF (Diploma in advanced French language studies).
- the TEF (Test d'Évaluation de Français - Diplôme de la Chambre de Commerce) and the e-TEF (digital version).

=== Special courses ===
These courses are designed for students with a good level of French. Some of them help prepare students for the tests required to receive a diploma from the Paris Chamber of Commerce and Industry.

==== The Business French Specialisation ====
The Business French specialisation prepares students for both the Sorbonne's French language certificate and the Paris Chamber of Commerce and Industry's diploma by teaching French business language (composition of business documents, the study of economics articles, etc.).

== Exam Centres ==
=== TCF Exam Center (CIEP-Sorbonne Centre) ===
Through a partnership agreement signed in 2006, the TCF CIEP-Sorbonne Centre is the only centre affiliated with the International Centre of Pedagogical Studies that can administer the Test de connaissance du français (TCF) in Paris. Since 2014, students are able to take the TCF on a computer (TCF-SO).

=== DELF-DALF Centre ===
In September 2010, the International Centre for Educational Studies (Centre international d'études pédagogiques - CIEP) and the CCFS signed a partnership agreement that founded the DELF-DALF Exam Centre.

The DELF-DALF Exam Centre is allowed to administer the exams for the Diploma of French Language Studies (Diplôme d'Études en Langue Française - DELF) and the Advanced Diploma of French Language (Diplôme Approfondi de Langue Française - DALF).

== Organization ==
CCFS courses are organized into sessions of various duration:

- Autumn semester (September–December)
- Winter session (January)
- Spring semester (February–May)
- Summer courses (June–August with flexible durations)

== See also ==
- Francophonie
- Français langue étrangère
- Sorbonne
- Société des Amis des Universités de Paris
