= Sorbonne Grand amphitheatre =

Coordinates: 48.84837°N 2.34344°E

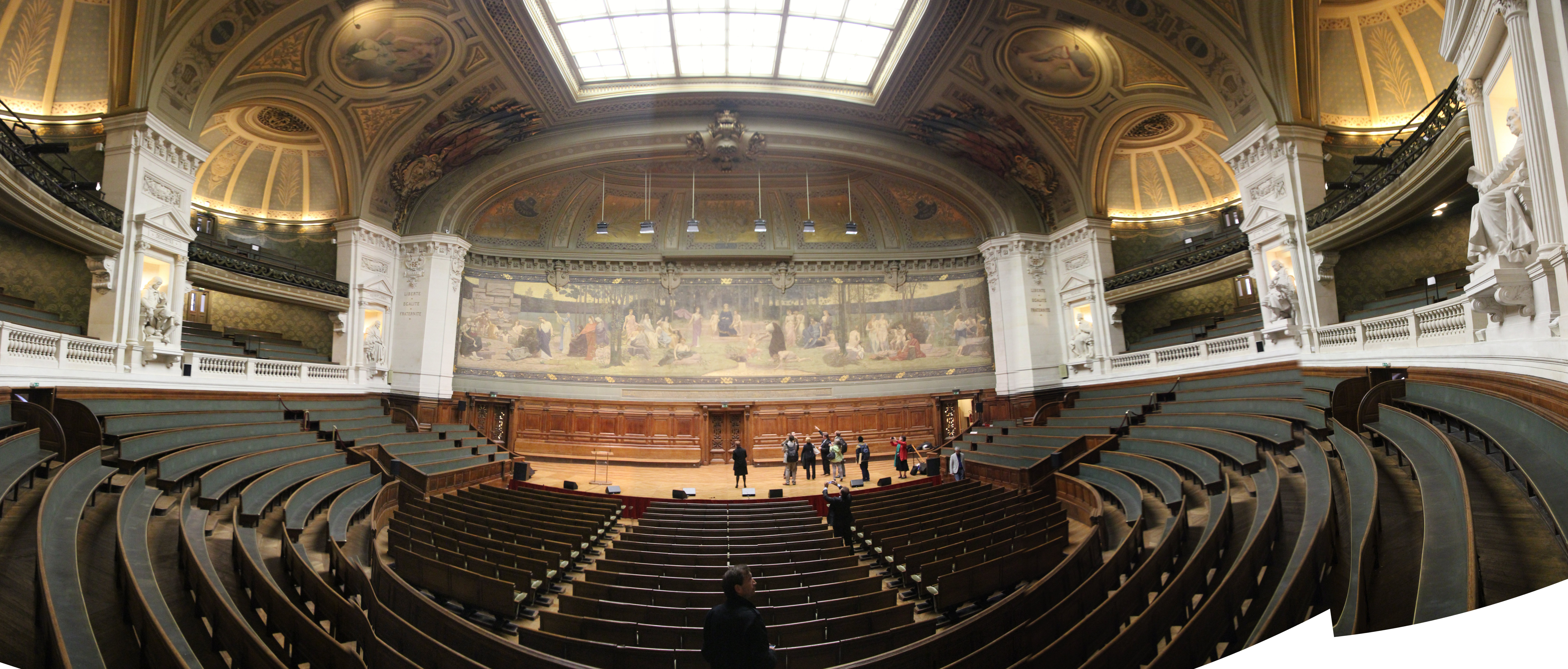

The Sorbonne Grand Amphitheatre is a monumental amphitheatre located in the Sorbonne building in Paris latin quarter. It provides a space for official speeches and events, as well as official ceremonies, degrees and prize awardings by the Sorbonne universities and the Chancellerie des Universités de Paris.

Inaugurated on August 5, 1889, the Grand Amphitheatre was registered as a historic monument in 1975 (along with other structures of the Sorbonne complex). It has a capacity of approximately 1000 people.
