= Action Française (post 1945) =

French Action Action française
- Abbreviation: AF
- General Secretary: Olivier Perceval
- Founders: Maurice Pujo, Henri Vaugeois
- Principal ideologist: Charles Maurras
- Founded: 1947; 79 years ago (reorganized)
- Preceded by: Action Française (1899–1944)
- Headquarters: Paris, France
- Newspaper: Aspects de la France
- Think tank: Institut d'Action Française
- Student wing: Action Française étudiante
- Youth wing: Camelots du Roi
- Women's wing: Ladies of the French Action
- Membership: 3,000 (as of 2018)
- Ideology: Monarchism; Orléanism; French nationalism; Traditionalist conservatism; Anti-parliamentarism; Vichysm; Euroscepticism
- Political position: Far-right
- Religion: Roman Catholicism
- International affiliation: International Monarchist Conference
- Colors: Royal blue Yellow
- Anthem: La Royale

Website
- actionfrancaise.net

Action Française is a French royalist and nationalist political movement that restructured in 1947 after its pre-war iteration was disbanded following the Liberation of France. Revived under the leadership of Maurice Pujo, it launched the newspaper Aspects de la France and the counter-revolutionary organization Restauration Nationale. Despite the death of its prominent leader Charles Maurras in 1952, the movement persisted, although it struggled to maintain relevance as monarchism waned in popularity and French far-right politics evolved.

In the decades following World War II, Action Française saw internal divisions, leading to splinter groups like the Nouvelle Action Royaliste in 1971, which sought to modernize royalist ideology. While its influence diminished, the movement continued through various publications and associations, with figures such as Pierre Pujo leading efforts to preserve its legacy. By the late 20th century, the movement’s focus on Catholic social teaching, traditional French culture, and Euroscepticism allowed it to influence broader far-right currents, including the National Rally. Today, Action Française positions itself as a think tank advocating for a decentralized monarchy, French sovereignty, and resistance to European federalism.

== Historical Background ==
Founded in 1899 by Maurice Pujo and Henri Vaugeois, Action Française emerged as a reaction to the Dreyfus Affair, promoting a blend of royalism, nationalism, and anti-parliamentarianism. Under the leadership of Charles Maurras, who joined shortly after its inception, the movement championed integral nationalism, Roman Catholicism, and a vision of a decentralized monarchy that upheld traditional French values. Throughout the interwar period, Action Française gained significant influence, attracting intellectuals, publishing a prominent daily newspaper L'Action Française, and mobilizing through its youth wing, the Camelots du Roi. However, the movement faced setbacks due to its condemnation by the Catholic Church in 1926 and growing competition from other far-right movements such as the Croix de Feu.

After the fall of the Vichy Regime, its newspaper was banned and Maurras was sentenced to life imprisonment in 1944, although he was reprieved in 1952. The movement nevertheless continued in new publications and political associations, although with fading relevance as monarchism lost popularity, and French far-right movements shifted toward an emphasis on Catholic values and defense of traditional French culture. It is seen by some as one progenitor of the current National Rally political party.

== Post 1945 ==
Action Française reformed itself in 1947, under the influence of Maurice Pujo, who created the newspaper Aspects de la France (AF) and the counter-revolutionary movement, "la Restauration Nationale" ("National Restoration"). After the death of Maurras in 1952, two rival newspapers, Aspects de la France and Pierre Boutang's La Nation Française revived the Maurrassian legacy, until the demise of La Nation Française in 1967.

In 1971, a breakaway movement called "Nouvelle Action Française" was formed by Bertrand Renouvin, Georges-Paul Wagner, and others. It subsequently became the Nouvelle Action Royaliste (NAR), which supported the heir of the House of Bourbon-Orléans (although in his 1968 reprinting of his study on the three French right-wing families, René Rémond still classified it in the legitimist movement because of its counter-revolutionary ideology). The movement called for the support of François Mitterrand in the 1981 presidential election, instead of supporting Jacques Chirac's "neo-Gaullist" movement (the Gaullists are classed by René Rémond as Bonapartists) or Valéry Giscard d'Estaing's "Orléanist" movement (because of his support of economic liberalism).

In the beginning of the 1980s, various AF figures, such as Georges-Paul Wagner or Philippe Colombani joined the ranks of Jean-Marie Le Pen's National Front (FN). Until the 1999 breakaway of the National Republican Movement (MNR) led by Bruno Mégret, Jean-Marie Le Pen's success was partly explained by his unification of the various far right families (such as French royalists, traditionalist Catholics, neo-fascists, etc.) which share few ideals apart from a distrust of liberal democracy and a staunch anti-communism.

In the 1990s, the leader of the movement was Pierre Pujo (Maurice Pujo's son), who died in Paris on 10 November 2007. The AF student movement, called Action Française étudiante, has approximately 15 local delegations in places such as Paris, Normandy, Rennes, Bordeaux, and Forez, and an official newspaper, Insurrection. Its president is Olivier Perceval.

== Action Française today ==
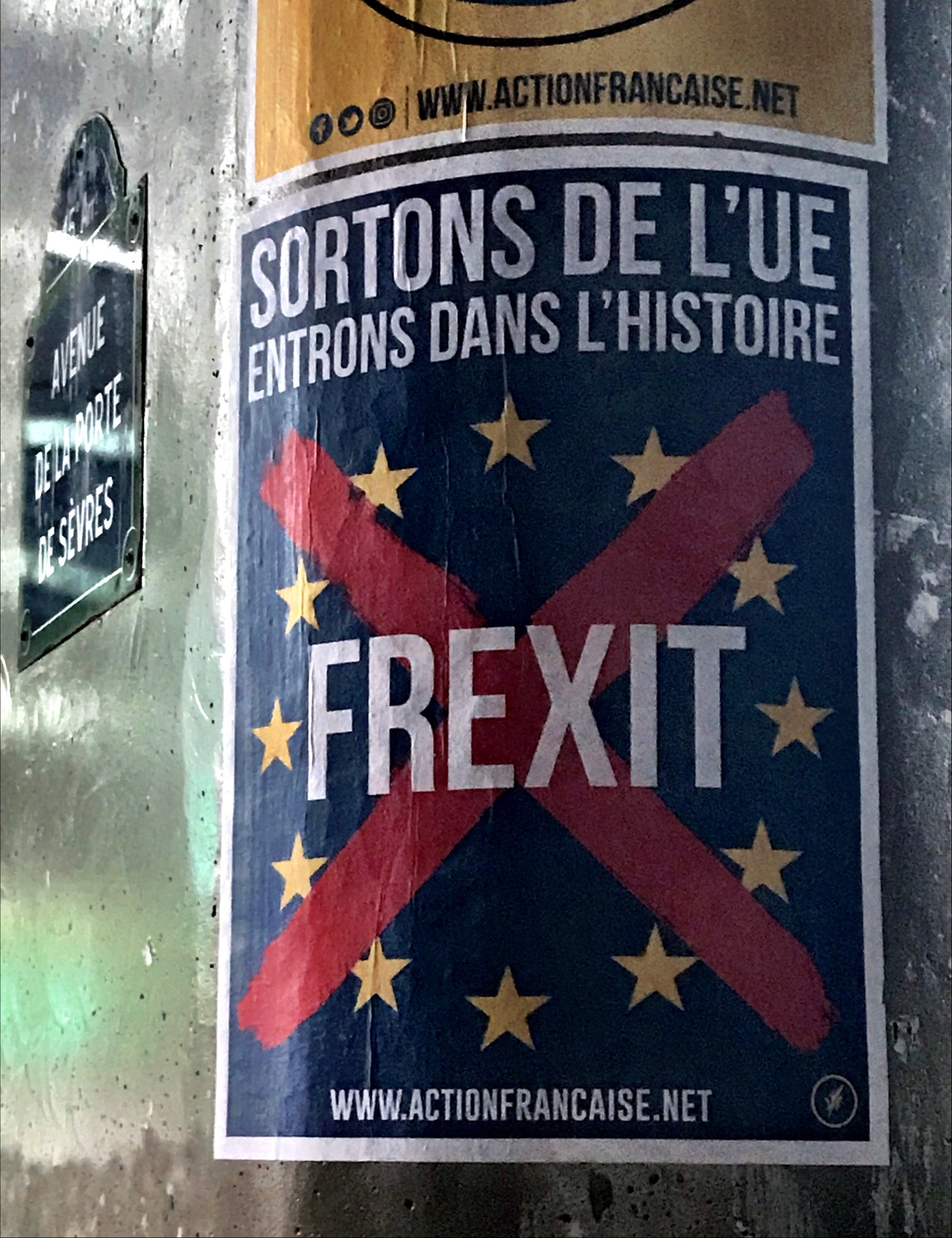
Election campaign poster by Action Française in favour of the withdrawal of France from the European Union.

Action Française has 3,000 adherents in 2018, grew by 18% in 2017 and 53% between 2013 and 2018. The movement stands for a traditional, hereditary, anti-parliamentary, and decentralized monarchy, and is strongly opposed to the European Union. The organization considers itself as a think tank and not a political party. The movement presents ideas to answer to all issues regarding the national interest of France, such as sovereignty, ecology, and globalization.

=== Political line ===
Politically, Action Française remains a royalist, nationalist, and counter-revolutionary (objecting to the legacy of the French Revolution) political movement. Its objective is to restore "a sovereign state fully exercising its regalian functions" in France through the establishment of a decentralized and representative monarchy that guarantees the "just exercise of lasting power". Politically, the movement advocates the establishment of a monarchy "adapted to our times that is not a return to an ancient order but a serious response to current issues" with the House of Bourbon-Orléans at its head. The movement also supports the idea of a "royalist compromise around the monarchy".

- Action Française is strongly opposed to the European Union, which it describes as unitary and utopian in spirit. Thus, in its words, "the EU would have put in place a centralising federalist system", a transfer of sovereignty of nations to European bodies.
- Refusing the "party system", Action Française puts the salvation of the nation above all individual and partisan interests, in accordance with its slogan "All that is national is ours". As the heir of Charles Maurras's ideology, the movement remains anti-parliamentary.
- Arguing that the family is the foundation of the nation and that there can only be marriage between one man and one woman, Action Française participated in 2012 and 2013 in La Manif pour tous and "le Printemps français" protests against the legalization of same-sex marriage in France, adoption of children by homosexual couples, surrogate motherhood, and medically-assisted procreation.

=== Organization ===
The official entity of the organization is called "Centre royaliste d'Action Française", even if the forbidden name is used in the communication of the movement. It publishes a magazine called Le bien commun.

Action Française is organized in region federations, in which stand local school, student, and workers' sections. Those sections circulate their ideas and debate in circles. The most known is the Parisian literary circle, "Cercle de Flore", which frequently invites French conservative and right-wing authors and political activists. Most of the circles are internal and are designed to train young members to the ideas of the movement. This is the case of the Parisian Charles Maurras circle which gathers the Parisian students.

Following its tradition, the movement edits a newspaper which is sold by its supporters in the street. This allows the young adherents to learn how to debate and publicly defend their ideas. Each year, on the second Sunday of May, a traditional cortege in honour of Joan of Arc is organized. The students of the movement have organized a summer university called "camp Maxime-Real del Sarte" since 1953, gathering approximately 200 activists.

During and after the anti-LGBT manifestations La Manif pour tous (2013–2014) opposing the legalization of same-sex marriage in France, Action Française created "le Printemps français", an activist submovement.

Action Française is active on social media websites and is followed by 31,000 accounts on Twitter and 27,000 people on Facebook. The movement uses YouTube videos and memes to spread its ideas.
