= L'Action française =

Newspaper of the right-wing Action Française movement

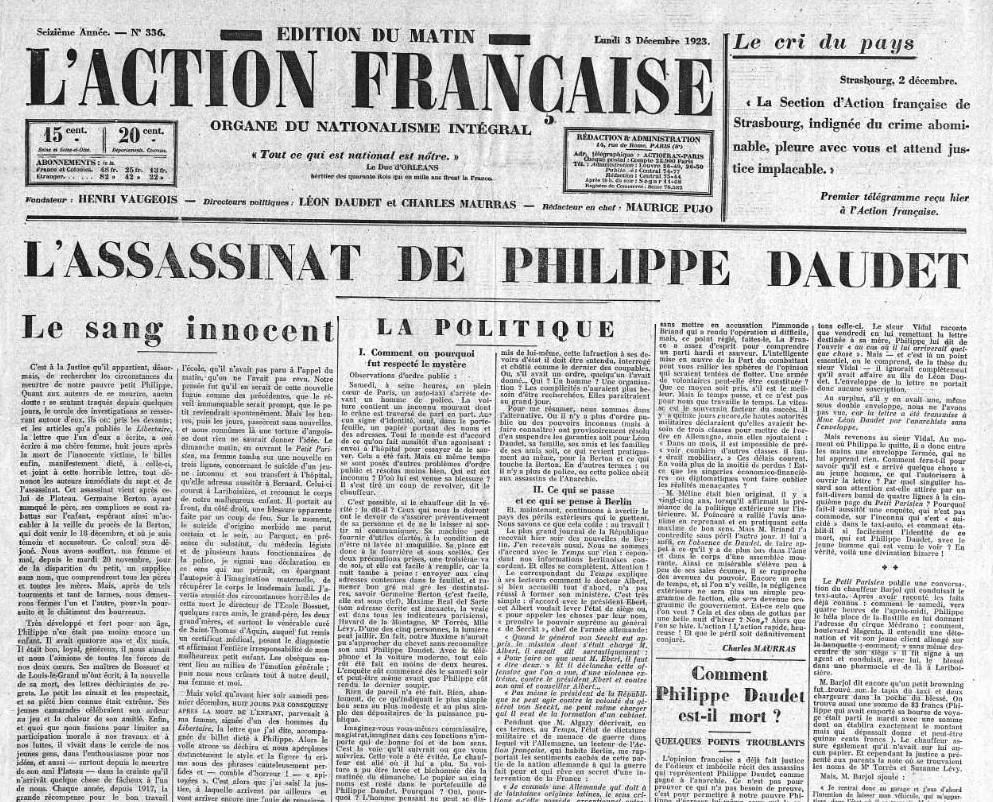
- Type: Daily
- Publisher: Charles Maurras
- Editor: Léon Daudet
- Founded: 1908
- Ceased publication: 1944
- Political alignment: Royalism, integral nationalism
- Language: French
- Headquarters: Paris
- Country: France
- Circulation: 200,000 (peak, 1934) (as of 1908–1944)

L'Action française, organ of integral nationalism (French: L'Action française, organe du nationalisme intégral) was a royalist French newspaper founded in Paris in March 1908. It was banned during the Liberation of France in August 1944.

The newspaper succeeded the Revue d'Action française of Henri Vaugeois and Maurice Pujo. Based on the Rue de Rome in Paris, its director was Charles Maurras, the leader of the monarchist Action Française movement. Its editorial line is classified as far-right due to its violent anti-parliamentarianism, anti-republicanism, and antisemitism. For a brief period, it also published a weekly edition titled L'Action française du dimanche.

== Official organ of the Action Française movement ==
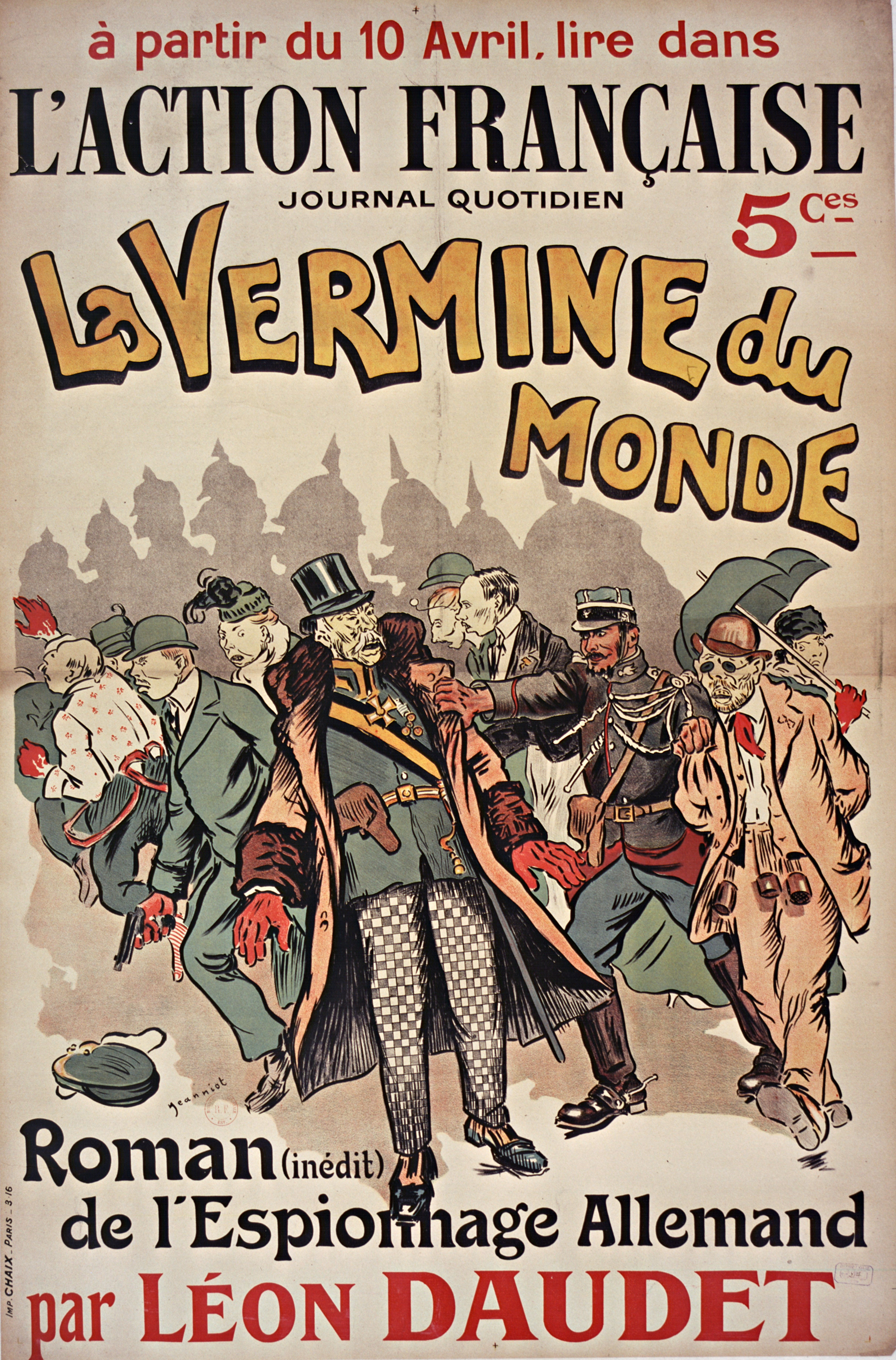
Poster (1918)

This newspaper was the official organ of the Action Française movement. It was a nationalist, monarchist, anti-Dreyfusard, and antisemitic daily.

L'Action française was a fierce opponent of the policies of the Third Republic, as well as of liberalism and democracy. Uniting collaborators from various nationalist and traditionalist movements, the newspaper became the crucible for the major currents of far-right ideology in France during the 1930s. Through denunciation and personal attacks, its journalists, led by Léon Daudet, conducted intense royalist and anti-republican propaganda during World War I and the interwar period culminating in the riots of February 6, 1934, and the Stavisky affair. The newspaper also waged relentless campaigns against the Soviet regime, communism, Jews, and Freemasonry.

The daily practiced defamation ("it often happened that people were falsely accused"), the use of false documents, and provocation to murder. It also served as the intellectual and literary hub of the Action française movement, gathering philosophers, historians, poets, and novelists around publications such as the Revue critique des idées et des livres (1908–1924) and the Revue universelle (1920–1941).

=== Sponsorship ===
The first issue was published on 21 March 1908, with the motto "All that is national is ours." It was sponsored by twelve figures, including Henri Vaugeois, Léon Daudet, Charles Maurras, Léon de Montesquiou, and Jacques Bainville.

The wider Maurrassian press gained a measure of success from 1908 onwards. 1908 also saw the birth of the Revue critique des idées et des livres, the "ideas laboratory" and literary organ of the Maurrassian movement until the war.

== Donations, drawings, and capital ==
The paper, which sent out thousands of free subscriptions, was in deficit and regularly called for subscriptions to fight "Jewish gold". Many donors came from the nobility; in 1912, the pretender to the Orleanist throne gave 1,000 francs a month. By 1914, the daily had 20,000 readers, half of whom were subscribers. Between 1920 and 1926, the paper's losses amounted to nearly five million francs. Billionaire François Coty donated two million francs to L'Action française between 1924 and 1928. Between 1930 and 1935, the average loss exceeded one million francs a year. In fact, "the only period when L'Action française's budget appears to have been balanced was shortly before it ceased publication" in German-occupied Lyon.

Circulation varied between 50,000 and 100,000 copies, peaking at 200,000 in 1934 during the Stavisky affair and the crisis of February 6, 1934.

== 1920s ==
Shortly before the papal condemnation, the daily saw its heyday. As a result, many French army officers sensitive to Maurras' integral nationalism read the paper. In 1926, with a print run of almost 100,000 copies, the nationalist paper had, according to Eugen Weber, 45,000 subscribers and the same number of single-issue buyers, plus 25,000 subscribers to the Sunday supplement, L'Action française agricole. In 1920, its circulation was just 60,000 copies. On February 5, 1934, it peaked at 200,000 copies.

At the military level, from 1928 onwards, a special page containing General Lavigne-Delville's column was printed on the 10th and 25th of each month, forming a link between the press, the army, and the authorities.

But in the same year, the Roman condemnation meant that many subscriptions were not renewed, although some remained loyal to the paper, such as Captain Philippe de Hautecloque, who was a regular reader of Bainville and L'Action française in the 1930s. Following the 1926-1927 crisis with the Holy See and Pope Pius XI's condemnation of L'Action française, Jacques Maritain distanced himself from the organization and the journal. The pontifical condemnation scandalized Georges Bernanos, a devout Catholic, who drew closer to the agnostic Charles Maurras.

== 1930s and the Vichy regime ==
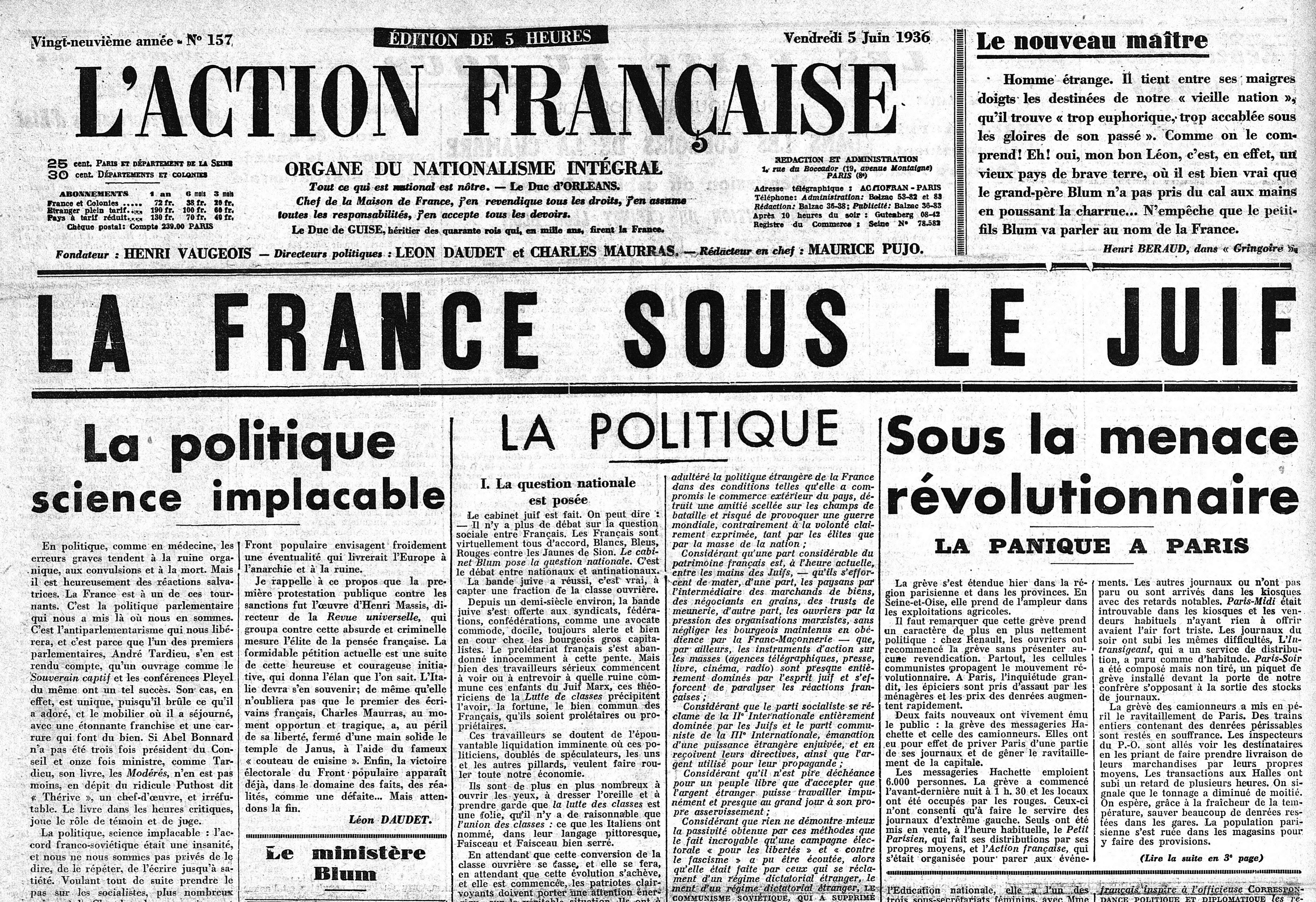
“La France sous le Juif”, anti-Semitic headline in L'Action française, June 5, 1936

Hostile to Pan-Germanism, some L'Action française collaborators criticized German policy during the 1930s.

After the 1940 armistice, the paper retreated to Limoges, then to Lyon in October 1940. The sympathy of Maurras and those close to him for the Vichy regime made him one of the ideological pillars of the new regime. After the occupation of the whole country in November 1942, alignment with the occupying power, Nazi Germany, became more marked.

Several journalists, such as Jacques Delebecque, employed in the Vichy regime's propaganda department (L'Éclair newspaper) and then a refugee in Switzerland until 1949 during the purge, were involved in collaboration with the Nazis. The paper regularly carried dispatches from the Office Français d'Information (OFI) announcing the Waffen-SS "conseils de révision" (review boards), until 1944, which opened their doors to Frenchmen wishing to enlist in the Charlemagne division. The paper was hostile to Resistance fighters, who were referred to as "terrorists". Maurras called for the execution of resistance fighters and their families. Historian Bénédicte Vergez-Chaignon sums up Maurras's inevitable break with some of his followers (such as Philippe Ariès): "After the decisive events of November 1942, the introduction of the STO and the creation of the Milice, a certain number of Maurrasians, like other French people of different opinions, discovered with varying degrees of violence that their desire to fight against the occupying forces was totally incompatible with Maurras' positions. The AF leader's discourse suddenly appeared for what it was".

When France was liberated, the daily was banned for collaboration, and its main contributors (Charles Maurras and Maurice Pujo) were imprisoned.

== Anteriority of the daily ==
=== Revue d'Action française (1899–1908) ===
The Revue d'Action française was the predecessor of L'Action Française, published from 1899 to 1908, when it received the new name.

== Posterity of the daily ==
In 1947, Georges Calzant founded a new Action française journal entitled Aspects de la France, using the initials AF. While this periodical remained faithful to Maurrasian doctrine, perpetuating a certain form of idealism and monarchist radicalism, Pierre Boutang (another disciple of Maurras) founded another journal claiming to be L'Action française: La Nation française. Gathering mainly intellectuals and academics (including Philippe Ariès and Raoul Girardet), this new branch of the AF was more reflective and better adapted to post-war political reality; it rejected the antisemitism of its predecessors and distanced itself from the discourse of Vichy nostalgists. It attempted to rethink monarchism and nationalism in the light of the problems facing France in the 1950s (notably the Algerian war), while remaining faithful to the initiatives of Charles Maurras.

L'Action française also published the Almanach de l'Action française, the Cours et conférence d'Action française and several works at the Librairie d'Action française.

=== Aspects de la France (1947–1992) ===
Founded in 1947 by Georges Calzant, Aspects de la France was a monarchist publication linked to the Action Française movement. It emerged in response to the 1944 ban on the daily L'Action française over allegations of collaboration with the Vichy regime. The publication also incorporated Les Documents nationaux, a clandestine review operated by Action Française members during the Liberation of France.

=== La Nation française (1955–1967) ===
Founded in 1955, La Nation française was a French monarchist weekly magazine influenced by Charles Maurras, the founder of the Action Française movement. It originated as an offshoot of Aspects de la France, the monarchist review created in June 1947 by Maurice Pujo and Georges Calzant. Both Pujo and Calzant, former members of Action Française, remained dedicated to the nationalist monarchist cause.

=== L'Action française étudiante (1971–1980) ===
L'Action française étudiante, subtitled "mensuel des étudiants de la Restauration nationale", was a French royalist monthly magazine published from June 1971 to 1980 by the Restauration Nationale (RN) movement. Led by Louis Juhel, son of RN founder Pierre Juhel, AFE also referred to student activist groups within the organization.

=== L'Action française Hebdo (1992–1998) ===
Founded in 1992, the periodical followed the ideas of Charles Maurras and L'Action française. Due to its resemblance to Maurras' magazine, the periodical was forced to change its name by a court injunction.

=== L'Action française 2000 (1998–2018) ===
The choice of the new title L'Action française 2000 was made on the basis of the court situation, and after exhausting all avenues of appeal. In 1998, L'Action française hebdo changed its name to L'Action française 2000, which is published fortnightly.

=== Le bien commun (2019 to today) ===
In 2019, the newspaper Le bien commun, published by the CRAF, took over from L'Action française 2000 and was also auctioned off by the movement's activists.

== See also ==
- Action française
- Aspects de la France
- Charles Maurras
- Maurrassism
- Nouvelle Librairie nationale
- Restauration nationale
- Revue critique des idées et des livres
- Revue d'Action française
- La Nation française
- La République lyonnaise

== Bibliography ==
- Weber, Eugen (1962). Action Française; Royalism And Reaction In Twentieth-Century France. Stanford University Press.
