= Renouvin =

Renouvin is a surname of French origin. Notable people with this surname include:

- Bertrand Renouvin (born 1943), founder and president of French political movement Nouvelle Action Royaliste, son of Jacques Renouvin
- Jacques Renouvin (1905–1944), member of the French Resistance in the Second World War
- Pierre Renouvin (1893–1974), French diplomatic historian
- Stéphanie Renouvin (born 1977), French journalist
