= L'Action française 2000 =

Newspaper in Paris, France

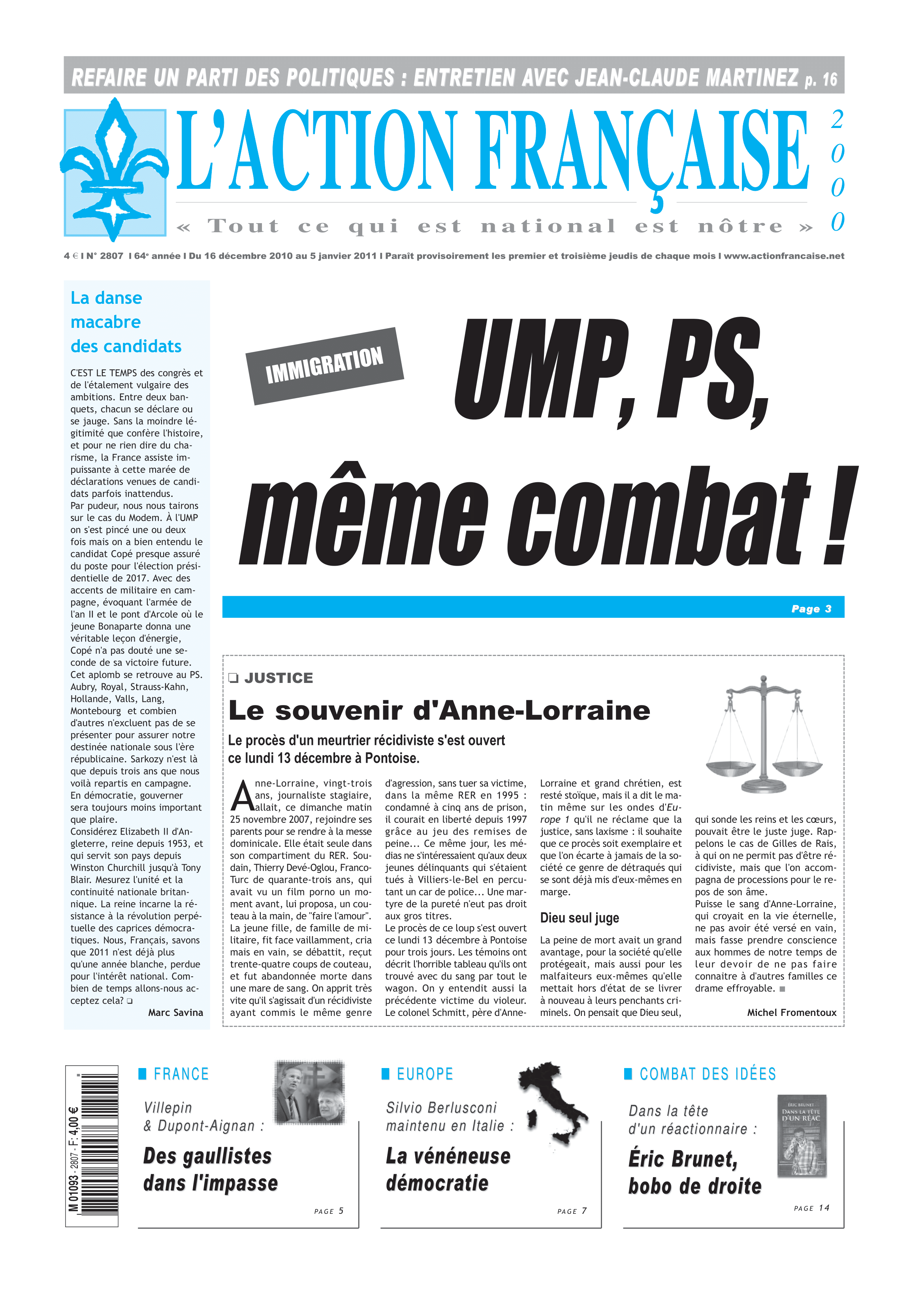
- L'Action française 2000, 16 December 2010 – 5 January 2011 issue.
- Type: National press, opinion journal
- Publisher: Marie-Gabrielle Pujo
- Editor: Philippe Ménard
- Founded: 1998
- Ceased publication: February 2018
- Language: French
- Headquarters: Paris
- Country: France
- Price: €4.50
- Website: www.actionfrancaise.net/laf2000/

L'Action française 2000 was a French newspaper founded in Paris in 1998 by Pierre Pujo, from the Centre royaliste d'Action française (CRAF). It served as the organ of the Action française political movement and ceased publication in 2018.

== History ==
=== L'Action française Hebdo ===
On 23 January 1992, L'Action française Hebdo was launched as a royalist French weekly, succeeding Aspects de la France and directed by Pierre Pujo. This periodical aimed to uphold the ideas of Charles Maurras and the Action française movement.

In 1998, during the internal conflict within the National Front, the newspaper expressed its preference for Jean-Marie Le Pen over Bruno Mégret. In its issue from 17 December 1998 (no. 2523), Pierre Pujo argued that Jean-Marie Le Pen represented the "Catholic and French tradition" that had defined France's greatness and its colonies, while Bruno Mégret, due to his opposition to racial mixing, was "incapable of understanding the French Empire."

That same year, following a court injunction, the publication was forced to change its name because its title was too similar to that of L'Action française by Maurras, which was banned under the Liberation laws of 1944. The new title, L'Action française 2000, was chosen after exhausting all appeals. Starting in 1998, the publication became biweekly.

=== A New Name for Posterity ===
By adopting the name of the daily newspaper founded by Charles Maurras, L'Action française, the publication positioned itself within that tradition and its predecessors, L'Action française Hebdo and Aspects de la France. Like its predecessors, the journal was sold by the Camelots du roi, today represented by the AFE and AFL.

The newspaper was published on the first and third Thursdays of each month.

Its main contributors included Anne Bernet, Aristide Leucate, Catoneo, and Jean-Philippe Chauvin. Initially directed by Pierre Pujo until his death, it was later led by Philippe Champion (November 2007 – June 2008) and finally by Michel Fromentoux until 2012. This royalist and nationalist publication also adopted a sovereignist stance due to the growing influence of the European Union.

L'Action française 2000 remained faithful to the legacy of Aspects de la France and the Action française movement, adhering to the doctrine of integral nationalism championed by founding members such as Charles Maurras, Léon Daudet, and Jacques Bainville. The journal defended France's independence and national identity while advocating for the preservation of Christian civilization. Opposed to the French Republic, it supported a hereditary and decentralized monarchy with a strong state defending local and regional values. However, the newspaper often promoted the concept of "nationalist compromise" and regularly supported non-monarchist political and social movements.

The title ceased publication in February 2018 after the publishing company encountered financial difficulties and halted operations "after 27 years of service."

== Criticism and Controversies ==
In January 2012, after the editorial board refused to publish a tribute to Xavier Vallat (the General Commissioner for Jewish Affairs under the Vichy regime) for the 40th anniversary of his death, editor-in-chief Michel Fromentoux left AF2000 to join the far-right, antisemitic, and racist weekly Rivarol. This decisive break marked a departure from the positions of its predecessor, L'Action française, during World War II.

== Legacy ==
In 2019, the journal Le Bien commun, published by the CRAF, succeeded L'Action française 2000.

== See also ==
- La Nation française
- Revue d'Action française
