= Revue d'Action française =

The Revue d'Action française, sometimes called the Revue d'AF or the little gray due to its gray cover, was the precursor to the L'Action française. It was a French biweekly journal founded by Henri Vaugeois and Maurice Pujo in 1899 on the first floor of the Café de Flore in the 6th arrondissement of Paris. It was directed solely by Henri Vaugeois. According to historian Laurent Joly, before its transformation into a daily newspaper, the biweekly served as a platform for an intellectual association to disseminate its directives. In April 1908, after a "monarchist subversion", it came under the direction of Charles Maurras and transitioned into a daily newspaper under the shorter title of L'Action française.

Initially, the journal's slogan was Henri Vaugeois's "Reaction first", but under the influence of Maurras and his Enquête sur la monarchie, the monthly became the organ of integral nationalism and advocated for a monarchical restoration.

The Revue d'Action française brought together many royalists, particularly those scattered after the failure of Count of Paris to ascend to the throne or restore the monarchy. It played a significant role in the Dreyfus Affair, being one of the primary proponents of anti-Dreyfusard, antisemitic, and revanchist ideologies; it became an influential bastion of nationalist right-wing politics at the end of the 19th century.

Historian Jacques Prévotat notes that the journal's founding coincided with a strategy of building momentum, which eventually led to the establishment of the Action française league in 1905 and its regional sections between 1907 and 1908. During the Dreyfus Affair, the journal was instrumental in disseminating arguments, publishing technical studies as weapons "in the battle against Dreyfus".

Vaugeois's journal gained the support of many notable figures of the era, such as Maurice Barrès, Paul Bourget, Jules Lemaître, and Léon Daudet. Its story continued in 1908 with the launch of the daily newspaper L'Action française (subtitled "Organ of Integral Nationalism") under Charles Maurras's direction. Its contributors carried forward the sharp critique of republican politics and democracy initiated by Vaugeois and Pujo.

== Key Contributors ==
- Bernard de Vesins, Charles Maurras
- Eugène de Lur-Saluces, Edmond de Mandat-Grancey, Eugène-Melchior de Vogüé
- Frédéric Amouretti
- Henry Bordeaux, Henri Dutrait-Crozon, Henry Gauthier-Villars, Henri Vaugeois
- Jacques Bainville, Jules Arren, Jules Caplain-Cortambert, Jules de Gaultier
- Léon Daudet, Léon de Montesquiou, Louis Dimier, Lucien Moreau
- Marie de Roux, Maurice Barrès, Maurice Pujo
- Paul Bourget

== Related Editorial Activities ==
- Publications of the "Bureau of Action française."
- Nouvelle Librairie nationale (directed by Georges Valois).

== See also ==
- Action française
- L'Action française
- Aspects de la France
- La Nation française
- Nouvelle Action française
- Restauration nationale
