= Charles Maurras, l'Action française et la question sociale =

1983 book by Bertrand Renouvin

- Editor: Éditions Royaliste
- Author: Bertrand Renouvin
- Publication date: 1927
- Publication place: France
- Pages: 222

Charles Maurras, l'Action française et la question sociale is an essay by the French politician Bertrand Renouvin, co-founder of the Nouvelle Action française, published in 1983. It is an analysis of the economic thought of Charles Maurras.

== Context ==
In 1972, Bertrand Renouvin defended a doctoral thesis in the history of law at the University of Aix-en-Provence entitled L'Action française avant la question sociale (1899-1944),.

Bertrand Renouvin states that it was while working on this thesis that he became aware of the urgency of "breaking with Action Française and abandoning the reference to Charles Maurras".

[...] I no longer think that the social doctrine of Action Française can "order a policy" for our time, as I wrote.

—

Later, this thesis was revised and published in 1983 under the title Charles Maurras, l'Action française et la question sociale. Meanwhile, Bertrand Renouvin presented himself as a candidate in the 1974 French presidential election and supported the candidacy of François Mitterrand in the 1981 French presidential election.

== Presentation ==
According to Bertrand Renouvin, the Action française would have deviated from its sources after the First World War "by necessities of political strategy". Before the war, intellectual exchanges took place between the Revue grise and revolutionary syndicalism. Renouvin studies these exchanges by comparing them with the events of May 1968, the concepts of workers' self-management and decentralization developed in the Lettre aux ouvriers of the count of Chambord until the Ordre social chrétien of La Tour du Pin. Renouvin unveils the constancy of the workers' demands of the Action française with in particular its support for trade unionists in 1906, "the defense of the eight-hour day in 1920 and the main labor reforms under the Popular Front".

Bertrand Renouvin intends to demonstrate how Charles Maurras' "politics first" kept Action Française away from social struggles, despite its instinctive anti-capitalism, and thus doomed it to impotence".

Journalist Gilbert Comte believes that Bertrand Renouvin is moving towards an "indefinable leftism, quite superficial in its formulations".

== Around the book ==
"Left-wing royalism" has its roots in this book.

Bertrand Fessard de Foucault published Charles Maurras et le socialisme in 1984 following his discussions with Bertrand Renouvin about the book Charles Maurras, l'Action française et la question sociale.

== Bibliography ==
- Senart, Philippe (1983). "Revue de Charles Maurras et la question sociale". Revue des Deux Mondes. pp. 763–764. ISSN 0750-9278. JSTOR 44182492.
- Comte, Gilbert (1983-07-20). "Lu Charles Maurras et la question sociale de Bertrand Renouvin, un anticapitalisme de droite". Le Monde (in French).
