= Pierre Pujo =

French politician

- Born: Pierre Maurice Alexis Adrien Pujo
- Died: 14th arrondissement of Paris

Pierre Pujo (born 19 November 1929 in Boulogne-Billancourt; died 10 November 2007 in Paris's 14th arrondissement) was a journalist, essayist, media proprietor, politician, and activist with a royalist background in France.

He was the son of Maurice Pujo (co-founder of the Revue d'Action française alongside Charles Maurras in 1899) and Élisabeth Bernard.

== Biography ==
During the Occupation, Pujo attended the Jesuit college in Lyon, and after the Liberation, he transferred to the Collège Stanislas in Paris. At the age of 15, he began his activism with the Action française. Later, he joined the Institut d'études politiques de Paris, where he was a classmate of Jacques Chirac.

After earning a law degree and a degree in literature, Pujo trained at the Institut technique de banque (ITB) and embarked on a banking career, working for eleven years at Crédit Lyonnais.

From 1962 to 1966, he directed the student journal of the Restauration nationale, AF Université, and later the weekly Aspects de la France, which became L'Action française hebdo in 1992. His editorials, titled "Lessons in French Politics," appeared regularly in the publication.

Pujo served as the president of the Action française's steering committee and as the director of the biweekly royalist, nationalist, and sovereigntist journal L'Action française 2000 (formerly L'Action française hebdo), which was affiliated with the Centre royaliste d'Action française. He authored several works chronicling the history of the Action française movement, co-founded by his father, Maurice Pujo, alongside Henri Vaugeois and Charles Maurras. A firm believer in the royalist tradition originating with the Capetians, he supported the legitimacy of the House of Orléans.

Occasionally, Pujo wrote under the pseudonym "Jacques Cépoy", particularly when penning editorials for L'Action française 2000.

Key moments in his career included opposition to Algerian independence and his successful efforts to retain the island of Mayotte within the French national community in 1976. Later, he critically observed the rise of the National Front.

In 2002, Pujo endorsed Jean-Pierre Chevènement in the first round of the presidential election, attracted by Chevènement’s traditional and patriotic approach to politics. In 2007, he supported Jean-Marie Le Pen due to Le Pen’s opposition to the Lisbon Treaty, though he expressed reservations about Le Pen, particularly regarding the commemoration of the Battle of Valmy by the National Front in September 2006.

He had a sister, Marielle Pujo.

== Works ==
- Aspects de la Vie Politique (4 vols., 1968).
- La Droite Nationale et Nous (1969).
- Actualité de la Monarchie (1974).
- Mayotte 79. La France dans l'Océan Indien (1979).
- L'Action Française et la Maison de France (1987).
- La Monarchie aujourd'hui (1988).
- Postface to a new edition of Maurice Pujo's Les Camelots du Roi (1989).
- Mayotte la Française (1993).
- Preface to François Marie Algoud's France, Notre Seule Patrie (2001).
- Un Demi-siècle d'Action Française, 1944-1999 (1999).
- L'Autre Résistance: L'Action Française sous l'Occupation (2004).
