= Lys rouge =

Lys rouge, "Quarterly journal of royalist studies", was a quarterly monarchist French magazine established in Paris in 1976 and discontinued in 2006. The publisher was Yvan Aumont and the editor-in-chief Jean-Philippe Chauvin. The magazine focused on the history of French royalism, on the action of monarchists in other countries, and on the debates about the political positions of the movement.

== History ==
The first version of the Lys rouge appeared in the years 1945-1946 as an organ of the socialist monarchist movement led by Jean-Marc Bourquin. The second, more short-lived, was created in the 1970s by a group of young royalists in breach of the ban on Action française. Only three issues appeared. Finally, in November 1976, the new Lys rouge appeared as one of the publications edited by the Nouvelle Action Royaliste. It closed down in 2006.
