= Pierre Juhel =

- Born: 9 August 1910; Paris, France
- Died: 27 July 1980 (aged 69); Paris, France
- Occupations: Journalist, royalist militant
- Known for: Founding member of the Restauration nationale

Pierre Juhel (9 August 1910 – 27 July 1980) was a French journalist and royalist militant. He was one of the founding members of the Restauration nationale movement.

Pierre Juhel was the son of a World War I Verdun veteran who died at the front. He joined Action française at a young age and contributed to the L'Action française newspaper from 1926 to 1939. Between 1935 and 1939, he served as the head of the Camelots du Roi in the Paris region.

During the Vichy France era, Juhel directed the Centre de formation personnelle (1941–1944) and later participated in the leadership of the French Red Cross (1945–1949). In 1950, he joined the editorial team of Aspects de la France.

In 1955, Juhel co-founded the royalist movement Restauration nationale alongside Louis-Olivier de Roux. This organization, which succeeded Charles Maurras’s Action française, was defined as the "Propaganda Center for Royalist Action Française."

During the Algerian War, Juhel operated clandestinely in support of the French Algeria cause under the pseudonym "Guillaume."

Pierre Juhel was buried at the Vaugirard Cemetery in Paris.

In Nantes, the "Centre Pierre Juhel," a center for royalist studies and documentation, honors his legacy. His son, Louis Juhel, continues his involvement in the Restauration nationale movement.

== Contributions and Recordings ==
- "Discours" (Speech), in L’Action française: voix et chants (Xavier Vallat, Charles Maurras, Léon Daudet, voice; Marie de Roux, Pierre Juhel, song), Paris, SERP, 1989 (audio cassette; originally released on vinyl).
