= Yvan Aumont =

French journalist and engineer (1938–2026)

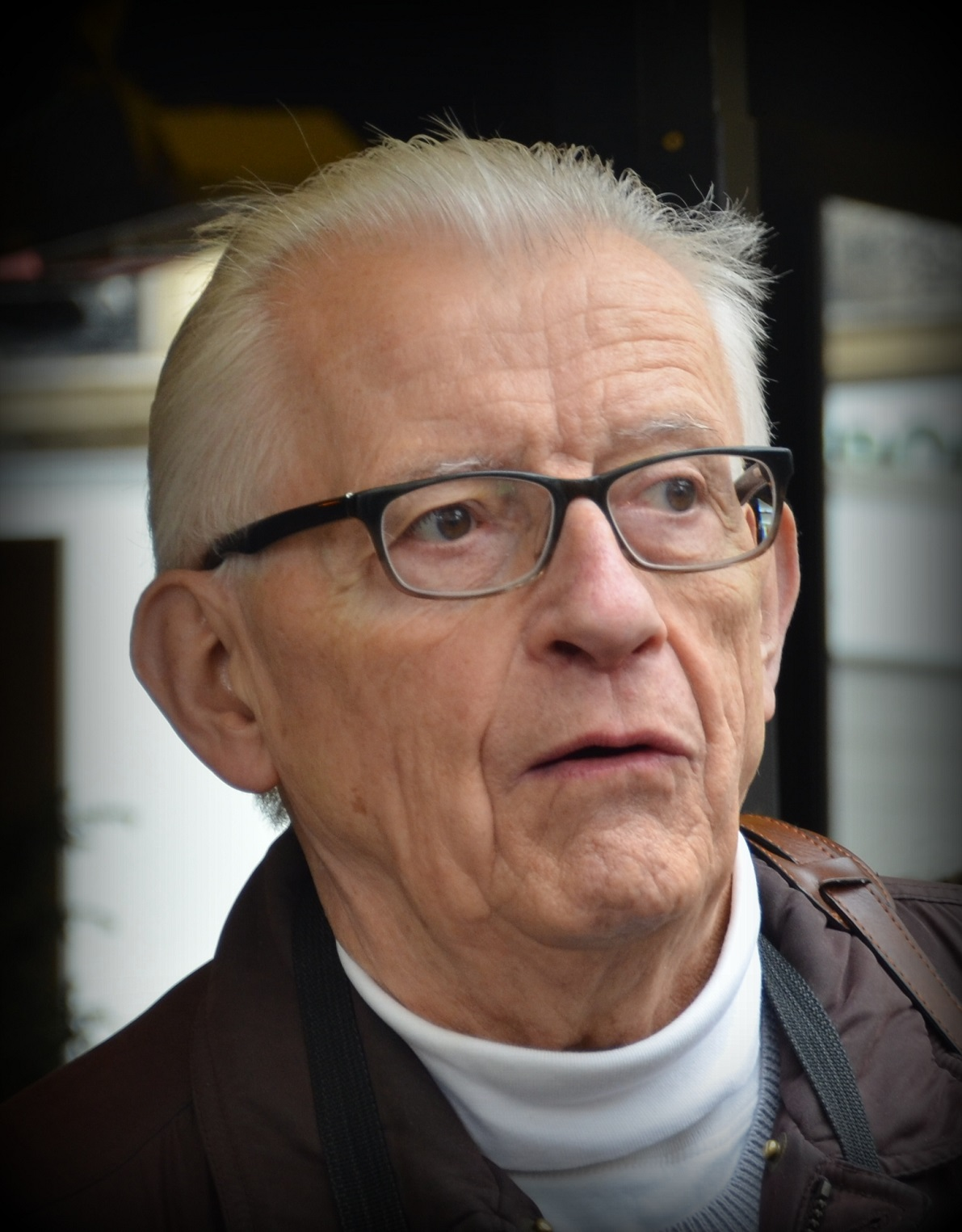
- Aumont in 2016
- Born: Victor Roger Aumont; 19 May 1938; Paris, France
- Died: 1 January 2026 (aged 87); Paris, France
- Education: Institution Notre-Dame de Sainte-Croix; École nationale supérieure d'arts et métiers
- Occupations: Journalist; Engineer

Victor Roger "Yvan" Aumont (French: [ivɑ̃ omɔ̃]; 19 May 1938 – 1 January 2026) was a French journalist and engineer, active with the Nouvelle Action Royaliste.

Born in Paris, the son of a small-scale industrialist who manufactured lifting equipment, he attended the Collège Sainte-Croix de Neuilly, then enrolled at the Arts et Métiers School of Engineering in Angers. A supporter of royalism in France, Aumont joined the *Restauration nationale* — the organization that succeeded *Action française* after the war—during the events in Algeria. He helped revitalise royalist activism within the universities on the eve of May 1968. He organized the movement’s propaganda and, together with a few of his friends, established a line of opposition to the Regime combined with dialogue with the protesters. At this time, Action Française (AF) enjoyed its greatest post-war successes and experienced an influx of young student and high school activists, whom it immediately mobilized in its campaigns against a supranational Europe (1970–71).

Aumont served as the Director General of the movement—overseeing its administration—and as the Director of Publications for the bimonthly Royaliste (whose editorialist was Bertrand Renouvin), as well as for the group's other publications: the journals Cité and Lys rouge.

== Death ==
Aumont died on 1 January 2026, at the age of 87.
