= Aspects de la France =

Periodical literature

- Publisher: Georges Calzant, later succeeded by Xavier Vallat and Pierre Pujo
- Founded: 1947
- Ceased publication: 1992
- Language: French
- Headquarters: Paris, France
- Country: France
- ISSN: 0223-5773
- Website: L'Action française 2000

Aspects de la France (initially titled Aspects de la France et du Monde), subtitled "The Weekly of Action Française", served as the official publication of the Restauration nationale. It became the hub around which Action Française was reconstituted after World War II. This monarchist periodical was founded in 1947 by Georges Calzant to replace the banned daily L'Action française.

== Establishment and early years ==
=== Founding ===
Aspects de la France was established in 1947 as a monarchist publication aligned with the Action Française movement. Its creation by Georges Calzant was a response to the prohibition of the daily L'Action française following allegations of collaboration with the Vichy regime in 1944. The publication absorbed Les Documents nationaux, a clandestine review run by Action Française members during the Liberation of France.

The newspaper's circulation reached around 20,000 copies by 1950. After Calzant's death, leadership passed to Xavier Vallat, followed by Pierre Pujo. The general managers included Pierre Ensch and Lionel Moreux.

=== Les Documents nationaux ===
Les Documents nationaux was an irregularly published royalist review founded in 1929. During the Liberation of France in 1944, the review operated clandestinely to avoid censorship. Initially typewritten, it was later printed and circulated under various names to bypass legal restrictions.

The publication ceased with the establishment of Aspects de la France in 1947, which continued the royalist mission.

== Editorial line ==
The newspaper adhered strictly to Charles Maurras's Maurrassism and promoted the doctrine of integral nationalism. Its editorial team aimed to rejuvenate the monarchist project of Action Française. Many contributors had connections to the Vichy regime and the collaborationist movement.

In the 1950s, Aspects de la France became associated with the royalist Restauration nationale movement led by Pierre Juhel and Louis-Olivier de Roux. It prioritized opposition to European supranationalism, criticizing treaties perceived as compromising national sovereignty.

== Contributors ==
Prominent contributors included Maurice Pujo, Charles Maurras (writing as "Octave Martin"), Pierre Boutang, Xavier Vallat, Michel Déon, Jacques Perret, Roger Nimier, Antoine Blondin, and historian Philippe Ariès. Later contributors included Henri Massis, Bernard Faÿ, Pierre Pujo, and Jacques Ploncard d'Assac.

== Associated publications and legacy ==
=== Associated periodicals ===
From the 1960s onwards, several other periodicals linked to Aspects de la France and the Restauration nationale movement were created:

==== AF Université (1964–1973) ====
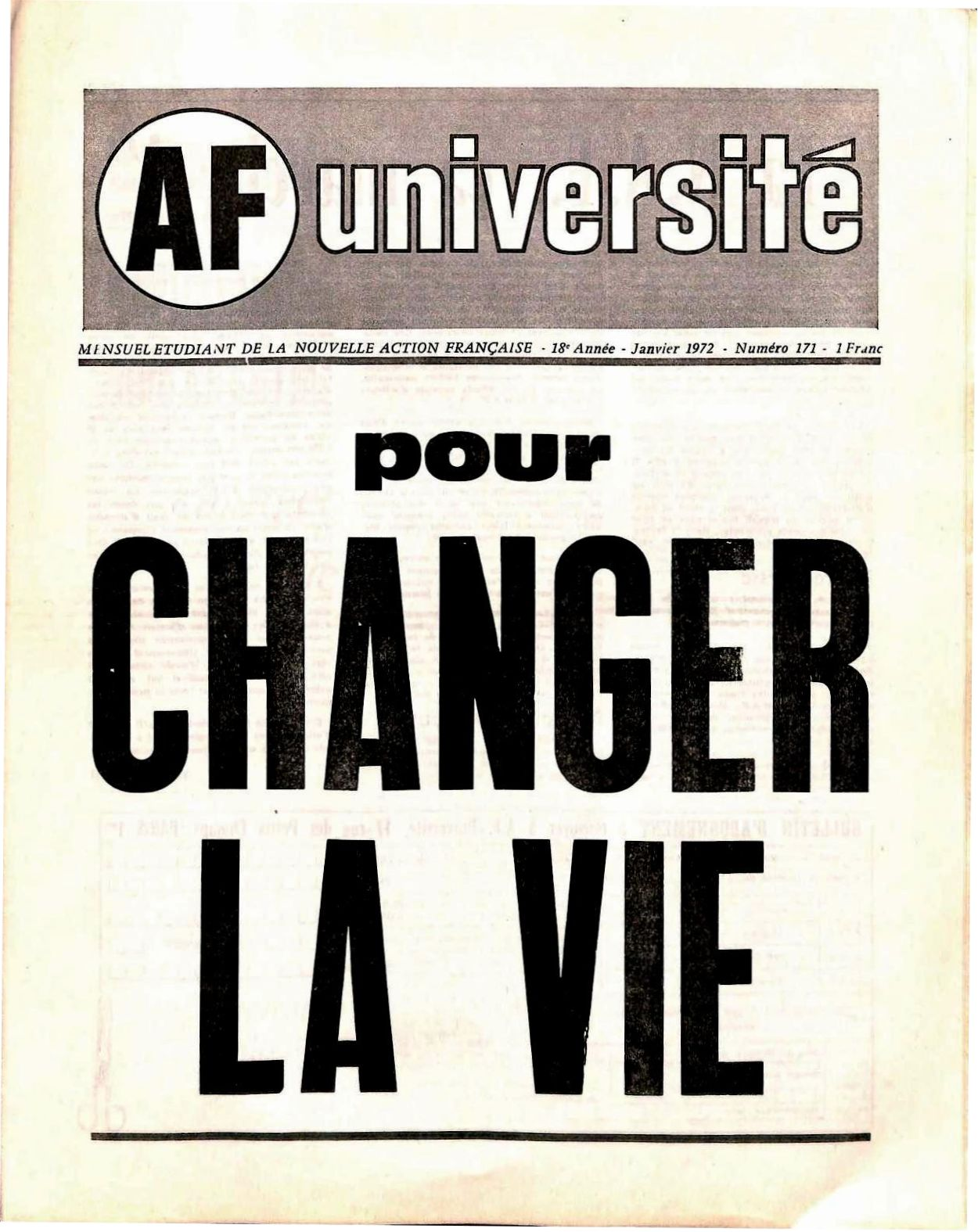
1972 - Cover of AFU

AF Université (AFU), which succeeded Amitiés françaises universitaires under the direction of Jean-Marc Varaut, was a monthly royalist French journal published from 1955 to 1973. It was affiliated first with the Restauration nationale movement and later with the Nouvelle Action française.

It served as the student branch of the periodical Aspects de la France, which succeeded L'Action française by Charles Maurras. AF Université was overseen by Pierre Pujo (former editor of L'Action française 2000), the secretary-general of Restauration nationale Pierre Juhel, and Xavier Vallat, editor of Aspects de la France until 1966.

In March 1971, a conflict arose when Juhel attempted to take control of the student periodical. These tensions led to a split within Restauration nationale, with dissidents Yvan Aumont, Bertrand Renouvin, and Gérard Leclerc leaving the movement to form the Nouvelle Action française.

Simultaneously, the Restauration nationale movement began publishing L'Action française étudiante as a supplement to Aspects de la France.

==== Dossiers d'Action française (1968–1971) ====
Les Dossiers d'Action française was a French royalist review published from June 1968 to June 1974. Initially, it was a quarterly periodical associated with Aspects de la France and the Restauration nationale. Following the split in 1971, it became one of the organs of the Nouvelle Action française.

Its successive editors were Hilaire de Crémiers (June 1968 to May 1969), Arnaud Fabre de Rieunègre (June 1969 to February 1971), and Yvan Aumont (March 1971 to June 1974). Each issue focused on a single theme, including decentralization, education, capitalism, Europe, agriculture, local freedoms, the NAF and revolution, and Bertrand Renouvin's campaign for the 1974 presidential election.

The Dossiers d'Action française ceased publication in June 1974 and was replaced by Les Cahiers de l'I.P.N. (December 1974 to September 1978) and later by Les Cahiers de Royaliste (October 1978 to December 1981).

==== L'Action française étudiante (1971–1980) ====
L'Action française étudiante, the "monthly publication for students of Restauration nationale," was a monthly royalist journal associated with the Restauration nationale (RN) and directed by Louis Juhel (son of Pierre Juhel, founder of RN).

The periodical was a supplement to Aspects de la France, itself the successor to L'Action française by Charles Maurras. In the mid-1970s, it was led by a group of students seeking to modernize traditional Action française themes, promoting a new, authentically royalist and "reactionary" politics. Under editor Paul-Henry Hansen-Catta, contributors included the Bocquillon brothers, François Moulin — leader of the Action française high school students in the Paris region — and Jacques Destouche.

From the January/February 1981 issue, L'Action française étudiante became Les Cahiers d'Action française. Several contributors left Restauration nationale to join the Nouvelle Action française in the late 1970s.

=== Post-1992 ===
Aspects de la France ceased publication in 1992, succeeded by L'Action française Hebdo and later L'Action française 2000. In 2019, the publication Le Bien Commun continued its legacy under the Centre royaliste d'Action française.
