= Georges-Paul Wagner =

French lawyer

Georges-Paul Wagner (26 February 1921 - 11 June 2006) was a French lawyer, monarchist and deputy of the far-right National Front (FN).

He was first an activist of the Action française (AF) monarchist movement, and then participated in 1971 to the creation of the Nouvelle Action française (NAF) along with Bertrand Renouvin. Opposed to the NAF's policies in the name of the hard-wing, he distanced himself from it in 1974. Wagner was elected deputy of the Yvelines during the French legislative elections in 1986, under the colours of the Rassemblement national which gathered members of the National Front and candidates supported by Jean-Marie Le Pen's party. Wagner was not reelected in 1988.

He founded in October 1986 the Institut d'Histoire et de Politique along with Roland Hélie and Philippe Colombani, a formation center of the National Front.

He has published books criticizing parliamentarism, and another one named "The trial of Maurras." Georges-Paul Wagner participated to Présent, a far-right review linked to the FN. He has defended in court Jean-Marie Le Pen, as well as members of the OAS terrorist movement who tried to assassinate General Charles de Gaulle at Le Petit-Clamart in 1962. He obtained the acquittement of Michel-Georges Micberth in the affair of the Pompidou's checks.

He succeeded in June 2001 to the historian Pierre Chaumeil at the head of the Association professionnelle de la presse monarchiste française (Professional Association of French Monarchist Press), created in 1882. He died on June 11, 2006.
