= Restauration nationale (France) =

Restauration Nationale
- Founded: 1955
- Founder: Pierre Juhel, Louis-Olivier de Roux, Georges Calzant
- Purpose: Establishing a monarchy Defending national interests Political reflection
- Headquarters: 10, Rue Croix-des-Petits-Champs; 75001 Paris
- Region served: France
- Members: 3,000 (as of February 2018)
- Key people: François Bel-Ker (Secretary General)
- Website: actionfrancaise.net

The Restauration Nationale (often abbreviated as RN) is a French political movement rooted in the royalist tradition and aligned with the legacy of the Action française. Positioned on the far-right of the political spectrum, it was founded in 1955 during the early days of the Algerian War by Pierre Juhel and Louis-Olivier de Roux, both former Camelots du Roi. Initially known as the "Propaganda Center for Action Française Royalism," the RN advocated for the French Algeria cause and supported the Organisation armée secrète (OAS).

== History ==
=== Founding ===
After the condemnation of Charles Maurras and Maurice Pujo in 1945 for collaboration with the enemy, the name "Action française" was banned. However, the Maurrassian philosophy survived through the efforts of intellectuals like Pierre Gaxotte and Thierry Maulnier. The royalist movement was reorganized by figures like Maurice Pujo and Georges Calzant, who relaunched the publication Aspects de la France in 1947. Around this publication, the RN emerged as a successor to the Action française, officially established in 1955.

Under the presidency of Bernard Mallet from 1962, the RN inherited the legacy of Action française, including its core tenets like "integral nationalism." Prominent supporters included Pierre Boutang and Guy Coutant de Saisseval.

=== Divisions and Reunification ===
In the 1970s, internal divisions led to the creation of the Nouvelle Action française by dissidents seeking to modernize Maurrassian thought. Another split occurred in 1997 between Pierre Pujo and Hilaire de Crémiers, resulting in two factions: the Centre royaliste d'Action française led by Pujo and the RN, which remained under Crémiers.

In 2010, efforts were made to reunite the RN and the Centre royaliste d'Action française, particularly through joint events like the Jeanne d’Arc parade and the Camp Maxime Real del Sarte.

== Ideology ==
The RN advocates for a return to monarchy, grounded in the ideas of Charles Maurras. It opposes liberalism and promotes policies aimed at preserving French sovereignty and traditional values.

== Media ==
The RN's primary publication was Aspects de la France, which later became L'Action française Hebdo. Additional publications included:

- Les Amitiés Françaises Universitaires (1955–?)
- Restauration nationale (1963–1971)
- L'AF université (1964–1973)
- Dossiers d'Action française (1968–1971)
- L'Action française étudiante (1971–1980), led by Louis Juhel.

A new periodical, also titled Restauration nationale, was launched in 1998 and edited by Hilaire de Crémiers.

== See also ==
- Alliance royale
- Centre royaliste d'Action française
- François Bel-Ker

== Bibliography ==
- Jean-Paul Gautier (2002). The Restauration Nationale: A Royalist Movement under the Fifth Republic (1958–1993). Syllepse. p. 371. ISBN 978-2-913165-87-8.
- Jacques Prévotat (2004). L'Action française. Que sais-je?. PUF. p. 127. ISBN 2-13-052073-1.
