= Maurras, la destinée et l'œuvre =

1984 book by Pierre Boutang

Maurras, la destinée et l’œuvre
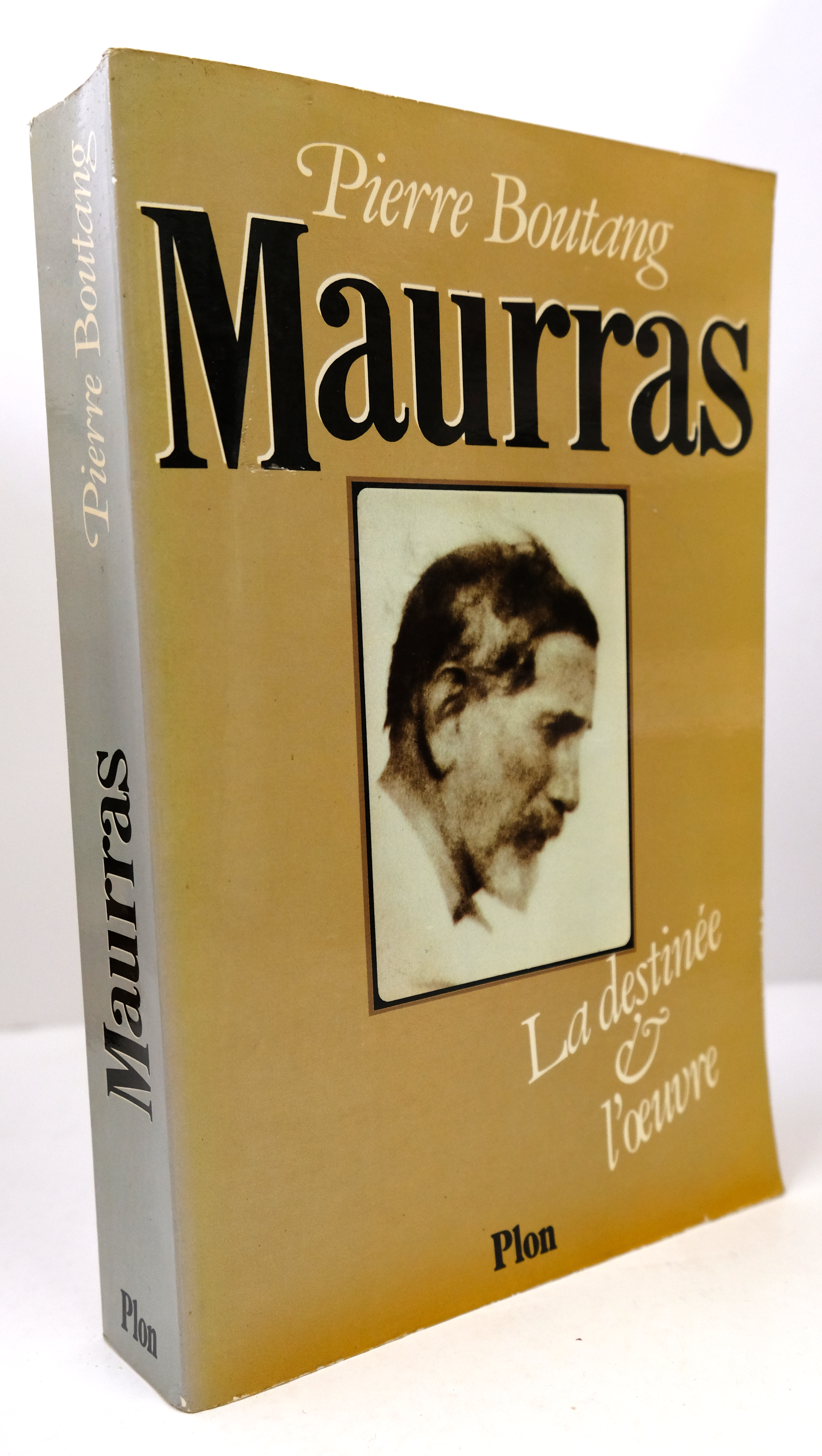
- Editor: Plon
- Author: Pierre Boutang
- Publication date: 1984
- Publication place: France
- Pages: 715

Maurras, la destinée et l’œuvre is a biography on the French journalist and politician Charles Maurras written by his disciple the French novelist and philosopher Pierre Boutang, published in 1984.

== Presentation ==
Pierre Boutang warns: "I write about Maurras, I do not write the history of Action française, which has been sketched out, which remains to be done, but it will not be by me".

Journalist Paul-François Paoli considers the book a "great biographical work".

Historian Bruno Goyet considers that Boutang's account of Maurras makes it possible to recompose "the canonical succession of the episodes of his life, by recreating their chronological coherence from a completely fragmented bibliographic substrate".

Maurras's support for Marshal Pétain is justified in the name of the Sacred Union already supported by Maurras during the First World War. Pierre Boutang reports that Maurras considered Pétain "an instrument of revenge".

As for the state anti-semitism of Charles Maurras, Boutang cites a letter from Charles Maurras to Benjamin Crémieux, published in La Nouvelle Revue française in July 1934, advocating the creation of a "Jewish province".,. Boutang goes beyond the anti-Semitism of Maurras' work to "grasp the singular aspect of Israel's destiny as a nation". In his book, which stands as a tribute, he writes that "Maurras' anti-Semitism is the most formidable obstacle to the understanding of his doctrine and his life". He adds :

the idea of a Catholicism saving the world from the “Hebrew Christ” is the worst, the least defensible, that Maurras conceived. Why deny that he actually designed it? Christ in his human nature was Hebrew, and even a “Jewish patriot”. The Jews recognized neither the divine nature nor that patriotism which made him weep over Jerusalem. It is too clear that Catholicism saved the world from the numberless heresies which disfigured Christ and his message; there was nothing Jewish about these heresies, the only religion where the Jewish influence was decisive was Islam, another religion, perhaps largely forged by the rabbis of Medina, themselves heresiarchs of the Judaism.

—

== Reception ==
The book received the Gustave-Le-Métais-Larivière Prize from the French Academy in 1984.

The biography of the "spiritual son of Charles Maurras" drift into hagiography time and time again. Boutang strives to treat "less the man than his work". Critics compare the relationship maintained by Pierre Boutang and Charles Maurras to that of Plato with Socrates.

== Bibliography ==
- Billig, Joseph; Berg, Roger (1984). "Les livres". Le Monde Juif (116): 193–199.
- S. R. (1984). "Revue de Maurras, la destinée et l'œuvre". La Revue administrative. 37 (221): 540–540. ISSN 0035-0672. JSTOR 40779398.
