= Jacques Renouvin =

French royalist militant and French Resistance hero (1905–1944)

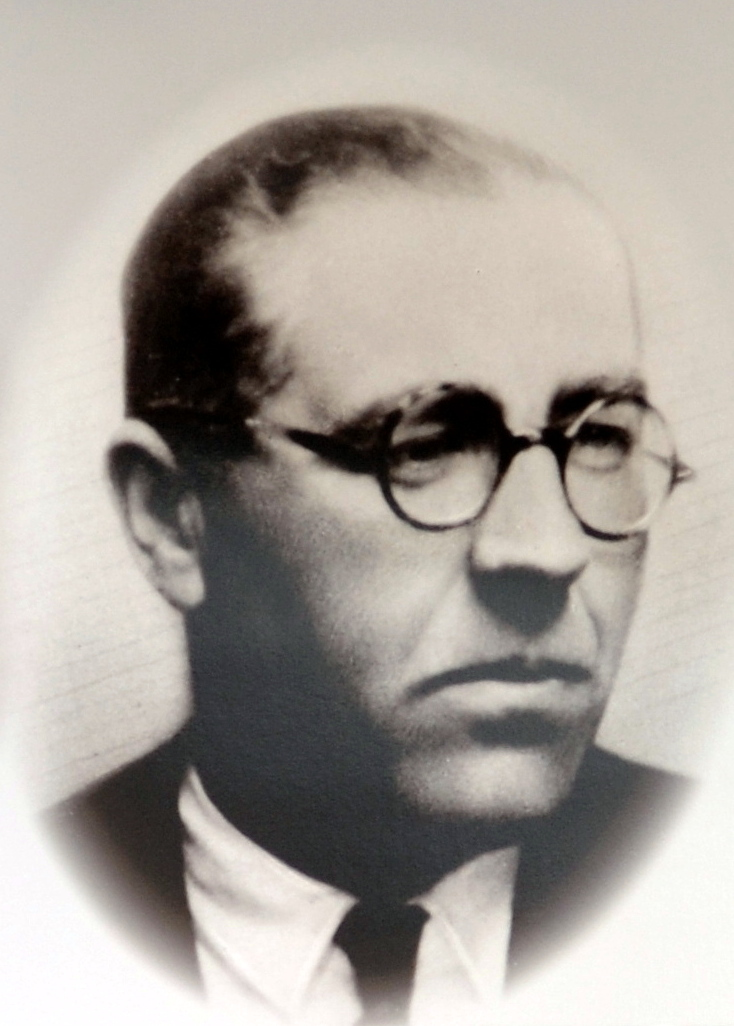
Jacques Renouvin

Jacques Renouvin (French pronunciation: [ʒak ʁənuvɛ̃]; 6 October 1905 – 24 January 1944) was a royalist militant in France during the Second World War and hero of the French Resistance.

== Biography ==
Born in Paris, Renouvin studied law and initially became a lawyer. He initially supported Action française, but left after the 6 February 1934 crisis. In November 1938 after the Munich Agreement, he garnered attention by publicly slapping Pierre-Étienne Flandin, who had sent a congratulatory telegram to Adolf Hitler. Renouvin was mobilised in 1939, and he was a volunteer for the corps francs. He fought a brilliant campaign, being wounded and taken prisoner. He escaped from the hospital to which he had been brought.

After demobilisation, he moved to the free zone in late 1940, and joined the underground movement Liberté created by a small group of Christian democrat teachers. Specifically responsible for propaganda, he organised youth commandos in pursuit of this. After the merger between Liberté and Les Petites Ailes which gave rise to Combat, Henri Frenay put Renouvin in charge of organising Groupes francs throughout the free zone. This position made him one of the most wanted Resistance members by the police.

Renouvin was arrested on the 29 January 1943 by the Gestapo at Brive-la-Gaillarde railway station, along with Mireille Tronchon whom he had married while in hiding. He was transferred to Fresnes Prison and tortured for several months before being deported to Germany on the 29 August 1943. Interned in Mauthausen concentration camp, he died of exhaustion on 24 January 1944.

He had a son, Bertrand Renouvin, from his marriage to Mireille Tronchon; Bertrand was born on 15 June 1943 while his mother was still being held in La Santé prison.

A 20 centimes postage stamp was issued in 1961 in Renouvin's memory.
