= La Nation française =

La Nation française ("The French Nation") was a French monarchist weekly magazine influenced by Charles Maurras, the founder of the Action française movement. It was founded in 1955 as an offshoot of Aspects de la France, another monarchist review founded in June 1947 by Maurice Pujo and Georges Calzant, former members of the Action Française who continued to support the nationalist monarchist current. Directed by journalist Pierre Boutang, others writers include: Jean de La Varende, Antoine Blondin, Roger Nimier, Philippe Ariès or Gabriel Matzneff. La Nation française supported Henri of Orléans, "count of Paris." After having defended French Algeria during the Algerian War (1954–62), it dissolved itself, on disagreements in particular concerning Boutang's "compromission" with Charles de Gaulle. The magazine ceased publication in 1967.
