= Stéphanie Renouvin =

French journalist and television presenter

- Born: 2 April 1977 (age 49); Nice, France
- Education: Centre de formation des journalistes
- Occupations: Journalist, television presenter
- Years active: 2001–present
- Television: I-Télé (2001–07); Canal+ (2002–07); France 4 (2010–11); RTL2 (2014–16)

Stéphanie Renouvin (born 2 April 1977) is a French journalist and television presenter.

== Early life and education ==
Stéphanie Renouvin was born in Nice in the department of Alpes-Maritimes. From 1986 to 1994, she studied at the Conservatory of Nice. After graduating with a hypokhâgne and a khâgne in high school in Nice, then a licence of history at the Sorbonne University, she graduated in journalism at the Centre de Formation des Journalistes (CFJ) of Paris in 2001.

== Television career ==
In 2001, she began her career on television on the news channel LCI as a redactor and commentator. In November of that year, she joined the news channel I-Télé from the Canal+ Group. In January 2002, she began co-hosting the midday news on both Canal+ and I-Télé, that she even presented alone during summer 2002. The news program is broadcast for the 2002–03 season, then removed from the list of Canal+. During the 2003–04 season, she presented the weekend news on Canal+ and also including a weekly chronicle in Merci pour l'info, the prime time program presented by Emmanuel Chain on the same channel.

From September 2004 to June 2006, she co-hosted the program La Matinale on Canal+. The program is also broadcast on I-Télé during the 2004–05 season. In September 2006, she left the presentation of the program and was replaced due to maternity leave. In January 2007, back from the maternity leave, she returned to presentation. Until summer 2007, she presented the daily news in the program En aparté on Canal+. In September 2007, she presented the daily news in the program L'édition spéciale from Monday to Friday on the same channel. She also presented StarMag every evening from Monday to Friday on TPS Star. In December 2007, due to the departure plan organized by the direction, Stéphanie Renouvin lest the channel and the Canal+ Group.

In November 2010, Renouvin joined the channel France 4 to present Certains l'aiment show, a program between news and entertainment, where according to EDEN, who produced her program, she wanted to associate her two passions that are information and artistic creation. In March 2011, after two episodes of 90 minutes with four columnists and reportages, the program was reduced to 60 minutes with two columnists and became weekly to be broadcast on Friday during the second part of the evening. The program was ended in April of that year due to lack of audience. In February 2011, Stéphanie Renouvin co-hosted with Cyril Hanouna the Victoires de la musique on France 4.

In September 2013, Renouvin presented the news program D8 le JT and also became a columnist on the talk show Le Grand 8 on D8. From August 2014 to July 2016, she co-hosted the morning program Le Grand Morning on RTL2, replacing Louise Ekland. In September 2016, she presented Pop-Rock Story on the same channel on Sunday during the first part of the evening. She later joined the channel W9 to present the new programs État de choc et Véto de choc.

== Personal life ==
In July 2008, Stéphanie Renouvin married Julien Hervé, author of Les Guignols de l'info. They have two children, including a son born in October 2006.
