= Life imprisonment in France =

In France, life imprisonment is a punishment of indeterminate length and may last for the remainder of the convict's life. The sentence is the most severe punishment given under French law and it can be imposed by the courts for aggravated murder, treason, terrorism, drug kingpin and other serious felonies resulting in death or involving torture. There is an average of 25 sentences of life imprisonment per year and there are 550 inmates currently jailed for life. Life sentences for crimes other than aggravated murder are rare.

Inmates jailed for life are required to serve a safety period of 18 to 22 years before they become eligible for parole.

In the case of child murder involving rape or torture, the premeditated murder of a state official (since 2011), and terrorism resulting in death, the court can impose a safety period of up to 30 years, or order that the prisoner is ineligible for parole at all, so-called perpétuité incompressible, or "non-reducible eternity". In all criminal cases, a review can be demanded after 30 years, although in the case of nominal non-parole sentences it is rarely if ever granted.

It is possible to give a reduction of the safety period for serious signs of social re-adaptation (even if the court has ordered that the prisoner is to spend the rest of his or her life in prison), and it is possible to be freed before the safety period for serious health reasons.

From 2011, the maximum penalty for persons who were under 16 years of age at the time of their crime is 20 years' imprisonment, with eligibility for parole in 10 years; life sentences are very rarely imposed to offenders between 16 and 18, the last being Mathieu Moulinas in June 2013 for raping and burning alive Agnès Marin two years earlier and the last before him was Patrick Dils in 1986 for stoning two children before being exonerated.
