= Pierre Boutang =

French writer

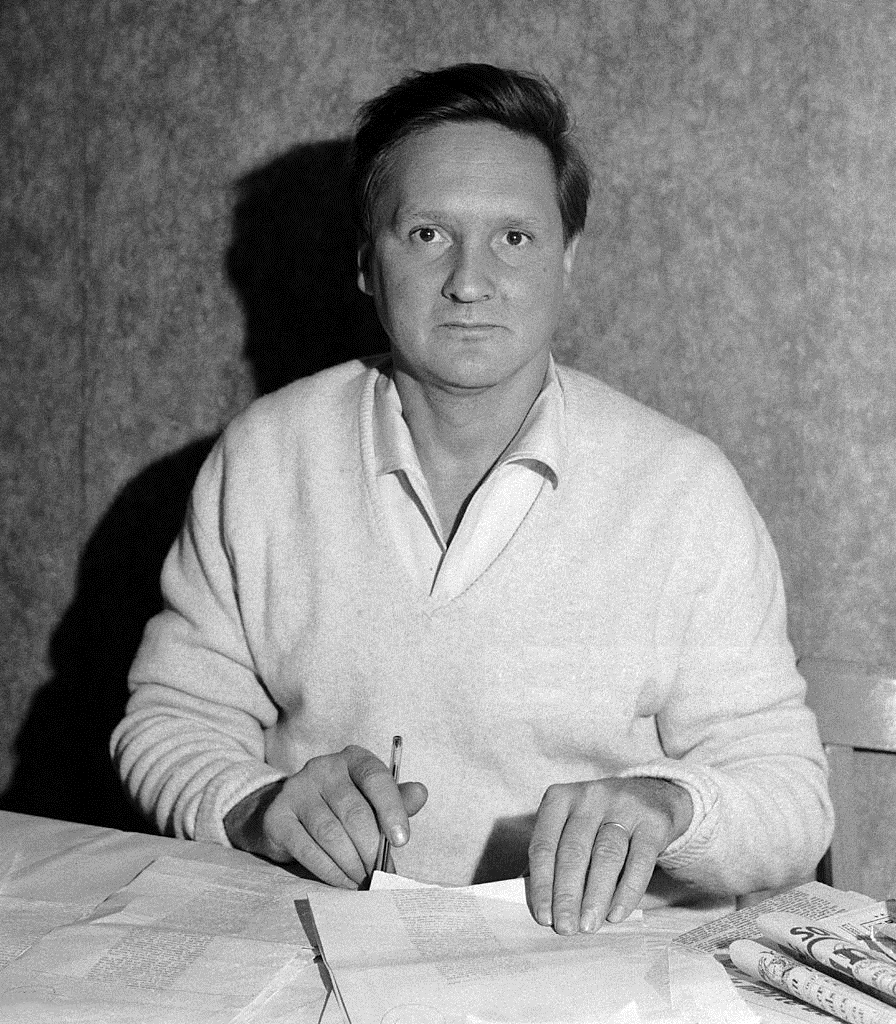
- Boutang in 1959
- Born: 20 September 1916; Saint-Étienne, France
- Died: 27 June 1998 (aged 81); Saint-Germain-en-Laye, France
- Occupations: philosopher, poet, translator, journalist
- Writing career
- Genres: Neoscholasticism, Christian philosophy, Christian existentialism
- Notable works: Les Abeilles de Delphes, Ontologie du secret and Apocalypse du désir
- Notable awards: Prix Gustave Le Métais-Larivière

Pierre Boutang (20 September 1916 – 27 June 1998) was a French philosopher, poet and translator. He was also a political journalist, associated with the currents of Maurrasianism and Royalism.

== Biography ==
Boutang was an alumnus of the Ecole Normale Supérieure (L 1935) and "agrégé de philosophie" in 1936, he participated that year in editing Action Française and showed fervent support for the ideas of Charles Maurras. That same year, while still a student, he married Marie-Claire Canque, a Hellenist, a graduate of the Ecole Normale Supérieure like him, and who bore him six children.

He was a member of Giraud's government in North Africa in 1943, and enlisted in the French colonial army, serving in Tunisia and Morocco until 1945. He was discharged without pension and prohibited from teaching. Thereafter he took up journalism, collaborating, since its founding in 1947, at Aspects de la France, where his articles from a royalist viewpoint showed obvious antisemitism. He was a regular contributor to Bulletin de Paris, where using a pseudonym, he reviewed plays.

Seeking to renew royalism, in alignment with Christianity, with his friend Michel Vivier he founded the weekly La Nation Française in 1955, to which Les Hussards and also Marcel Aymé, Gustave Thibon, and Armand Robin contributed. It ceased to exist in 1967. He wanted to create "a Sartre shelter" that also functioned against the adherents of nihilism. He veered between supporting Charles de Gaulle and opposing him, insisting notably on the monarchical model on which, in his view, the constitution of the Cinquième République rested. Though he denounced the terror for which the FLN was responsible, Boutang refused to support the OAS. From the 1970s, his political declarations became rarer, but he showed a firm loyalty to the Comte de Paris.

After representations by Edmond Michelet, Alain Peyrefitte and others, Boutang was allowed to teach by President de Gaulle in 1967. He taught philosophy at the Lycée Turgot, and then became a lecturer at the University of Brest in 1974. Finally he was appointed Professeur of Metaphysics at the Sorbonne, where he taught until 1984, continuing his seminars at his home in Saint-Germain-en-Laye until the end of his life. He died on 27 June 1998.

== Works ==
Non-fiction

- Amis du Maréchal (with Henri Dubreuil, 1941).
- Sartre est-il un Possédé? (1946).
- La Politique: la Politique Considérée comme Souci (1948).
- La République de Joinovici (1949).
- Les Abeilles de Delphes (1952).
- Commentaire sur Quarante-neuf Dizains de la 'Délie' (1953).
- La Terreur en Question (1958).
- L'Ontologie du Secret (1973).
- Reprendre le Pouvoir (1977).
- Gabriel Marcel Interrogé (1977).
- Apocalypse du Désir (1979).
- La Fontaine Politique (1981).
- Précis de Foutriquet. Contre Giscard (1981).
- Maurras, la destinée et l’œuvre (1984).
- Art Poétique (1988).
- Karin Pozzi ou la Quête de l'Immortalité (1991).
- Le Temps. Essai sur l'Origine (1993).
- Dialogues. Sur le Mythe d'Antigone. Sur le Sacrifice d'Abraham (with George Steiner, 1994).
- La Fontaine. Les "Fables" ou la Langue des Dieux (1995).
- William Blake Manichéen et Visionnaire (1990).

Posthumous

- La Source Sacrée (Les Abeilles de Delphes II, 2003).
- Dialogue sur le Mal (with George Steiner, 2003).
- La Guerre de Six Jours (2011).

Fiction

- La Maison un Dimanche. Suivi de Chez Madame Dorlinde (1947).
- Quand le Furet s'Endort (1948).
- Le Secret de René Dorlinde (1958).
- Le Purgatoire (1976).

Translations

- Apologie de Socrate, by Plato (1946).
- Le Banquet, by Plato (1972).
- L'Auberge Volante, by G. K. Chesterton (1990).
- Chansons et Mythes, by William Blake (1989).
