= Nouvelle Action Royaliste =

Royalist political movement in France

New Royalist Action Nouvelle Action royaliste
- General director: Yvan Aumont
- Political director: Bertrand Renouvin
- Founded: 1971 (as Nouvelle Action française); 1978; 48 years ago (as NAR)
- Split from: Action Française (post 1945)
- Headquarters: 36–38, rue Sibuets 75012 Paris
- Newspaper: Lys rouge
- Membership (2007): 1,500
- Ideology: Royalism (Orléanism); Souverainism; Keynesian economics; Anti-Atlanticism; Left-wing Gaullism
- International affiliation: International Monarchist Conference
- Colours: Black White
- National Assembly: 0 / 577
- Senate: 0 / 348
- European Parliament: 0 / 74

Website
- nouvelle-action-royaliste.fr

The New Royalist Action (French: Nouvelle Action royaliste, NAR) is a royalist political movement desiring to create a constitutional monarchy in France under the House of Orléans. A member of the International Monarchist Conference, it represents the left-wing faction of the French monarchist movement.

== History ==
The NAR political movement has its roots in Action Française, the major French monarchist movement before World War II, which was re-formed by Maurice Pujo in 1947 around the movement Restoration Nationale, as well as La Nation française magazine in the aftermath of the protests of 1968 and by concession of Maurice Clavel. On 31 March 1971, a breakaway movement was led by Yvan Aumont, Gérard Leclerc (director of the Institute of National Politics and national director of study circles), and Bertrand Renouvin, the author of the "Royalist Project". (Note: As reported by Le Monde in December 1973, "[t]he royalist movement New Action Française, born from a dissidence within Restoration National, organizes, Wednesday evening 12 December on 44, rue de Rennes, a public meeting intended to present the 'Royalist Project', whose author, Bertrand Renouvin, is one of the founders of the NAF. It could be a small white book with a red cover. It could be the other way around... In any case, this Royalist Project must demonstrate, if it were still necessary, and once and for all, that the youth of the New French Action are neither fascists nor leftists, nor fossils. And this, even if their monarchist thesis often suffers, and rightly so, from the ambiguities and compromises experienced by many of its defenders in the more or less recent past. For those who they created the NAF (1) by sending around some old moons, it would be unfair to blame the historical missteps of their ancestors under the lily. If there is anyone who has spontaneously tried to 'dust off' the monarchical idea, it is precisely these, dissidents of the old Restoration Nationale, nonconformists who no longer have much to do with the political family to which they are still tied by habit: the far right. What do these royalists want? The king, of course, but above all the permanence and unity that he embodies in their eyes. A permanence and unity that are essential for them to be able to carry out all the reforms, all the upheavals, in short all the revolutions that they have in mind. And there they have: regional autonomy, self-management (or almost) in companies, 'social management' of the state, questioning of a certain [economic] growth and of a certain urban planning, the end of capitalist society... A singular mixture of the most daring ideas of each of the political parties existing today, from Gaullism to socialism, including the radicalism of regional power. But with the addition of this idea of a France 'bristling with freedom' of councils and parliaments. A France that is perhaps not exactly the one taught in the books of school textbook of the Republic, but which corresponds to a past reality while being strangely close to the France of certain regionalists or local autocrats.") Alongside fellow former steering committee members Yves Lemaignen, Jean Toublanc, and Georges-Paul Wagner, they established the Nouvelle Action française; it broke with the ties to French far-right figure Charles Maurras that Action Française had, a decision that was praised by the then Orléanist throne contender Henri, Count of Paris. On 15 October 1978, it changed its name in Nouvelle Action royaliste.

Renouvin, the working-class son of French Resistance fighter Jacques Renouvin with monarchist leanings who died during the deportation to the Mauthausen concentration camp, (Note: Born a commoner to a mother who was a magistrate and a father who was a lawyer and was deported during World War II for having worked in the French Resistance, Renouvin did not come from a noble lineage or any royal lineage. He said that he is indebted to sociologists Michel Pinçon and Monique Pinçon-Charlot for having discovered the reality of the nobility, a "social class completely separated from the nation; a very particular world".) and arguably "France's most prominent ... and reasonable monarchist", is the group's president under the title of political director. The NAR publish in particular the bimonthly historical review Lys rouge, the trimestrial Cité, and the political trimestrial Royaliste, the latter of which is edited by Renouvin. For the 1974 French presidential election, Renouvin was its candidate, and obtained 0.17% of the votes. During the 1970s, several members of the NAR were elected, such as in Épinal and Angers, on the electoral lists of the Union of the Left during the municipal elections.

In 1975, dissidents founded the Provisional Committee for the Coordination of Royalist Operations led by Fabrice O'Driscoll. In the 1977 French municipal elections, then still known as the Nouvelle Action française, it presented thirteen lists in Paris and one in Nice. For the 1978 French legislative election, the NAR presented eight candidates; in addition to Leclerc and Renouvin, the other candidates included Philippe Cailleux, Régine Denis-Judicis, Michele Giraud, Nicola Luca, Stephane Monet, and Patrizio Simone. For the 1981 French presidential election, Renouvin was listed among the sixty-four individuals who expressed their desire to run for president of France; the NAR ultimately did not field any candidate, and it supported the Socialist Party candidate François Mitterrand. In 1982, the Circles of New Citizenship open to various political figures was founded. On 30 August 1984, Renouvin was appointed by Mitterrand as a member of the Economic and Social Council; Renouvin held this position until 1994.

In the 1986 French legislative elections, the NAR presented one list (M.-et-L.), which obtained 2,230 votes (0.67%). In the 1988 French presidential election, it endorsed Mitterrand's re-election bid. In November 1989, the NAR joined the 89 pour l'égalité movement, which campaigned to get voting rights for immigrants and garnered over 500,000 signatures (512,000), alongside SOS Racisme. Between April and December 1991, the NAR joined United France, a group led by Jean-Pierre Soisson. In the 1993 French legislative election, the NAR supported a negative vote against The Greens and the National Front. In the 1995 French presidential election, the NAR called for blank votes. By the time of the 2002 French presidential election, Renouvin chose to support the candidature of Jean-Pierre Chevènement, a well known republican who from 1997 to 2000 was the Minister of the Interior, (Note: Despite the NAR's endorsement, the Paris Count of Orléans said that he would not give voting instructions for the 2002 presidential election and disavowed those of the NAR.) and the only souverainist able in Renouvin's view to gather the good will of both the Left and Right for the purpose of regaining France her position in the world. The NAR appealed to vote against the Treaty establishing a Constitution for Europe in the French referendum on the European Constitution of 29 May 2005. (Note: For the article where the NAP appealed to vote against the 2005 French referendum on the European Constitution, see Renouvin, Bertrand (5 May 2005). "Non au " traité constitutionnel "". Royaliste (in French). No. 160 – via Bertrand-Renouvin.fr.) For the 2007 French presidential election, the NAF again called for blank votes, citing the lack of Debout la République candidate Nicolas Dupont-Aignan on the ballot. In the 2012 French presidential election, it supported Dupont-Aignan in the first round and the Socialist candidate Francois Hollande in the runoff.

== Ideology ==
The NAR describes itself as royalist (Orléanists), democratic (supporting representative democracy, the Declaration of the Rights of Man and of the Citizen, the French Constitution of 1791, and the democratization of French monarchy, citing other existing democratic monarchies in Europe, and calling for the complete continuation of the constitutional work implemented by Charles de Gaulle), and republican (considering the constitutional monarchy it supports as best representing the res publica); it says that monarchy is not an utopia, arguing that neither communism nor economic liberalism had worked to their pure theories (real socialism and actually existing capitalism), that the monarchy ruled France for eight centuries, and that while it does not seek to return to the ancien régime that died in 1789, the NAR does not consider the monarchy an outdated institution, since it remains alive in several other countries in Europe. The NAR's declared goal is to "promote the restoration of a popular monarchy embodied by the Count of Paris", and argues that the Constitution of the Fifth Republic is "entirely monarchical in inspiration".

The ideas of the NAR, which is a member of the International Monarchist Conference, are characterized by souverainism, anti-neoliberalism (they are economically Keynesian), and anti-Atlanticism (being close to the left-wing Gaullists). At its founding, it combined Gaullism, socialism, and radical regionalism. In 1989, it was described as centrist. The members of the NAR are sometimes described as "royalists of the Left", also due to close relations to certain ideas defended by the parties of the French Left, and emobodies "a royalism with Gaullist nuances". Due to this and for their calls for constitutional monarchism, which is also appreciated by the sociologist Michel Michel who was a one-time collaborator in the NAR's Arsenal review, the NAR is not considered a far-right movement, with significant differences from Action Française. As the NAR's political director, Renouvin, who is an Orléanist and a supporter of Chevènement (a significant figure of the French Left), a monarchist but anti-Maurras, and a royalist but not anti-republican, (Note: French royalists who are Orléanists favour of the return of the House of Orléans, the branch of the House of Bourbon descended from the last king of the French, namely Louis-Philippe, and heirs of the Count of Paris, grandfather of the latest pretender to the throne of France, Jean, Count of Paris. In a promotional video during his 1974 presidential campaign for the Nouvelle Action française, Renouvin waits several minutes before expressing his royalist views; by 2011, he expressed his view that now it is less taboo to express such views, and argued that the Fifth French Republic is "a regime of elective monarchy" and that the five-year mandate is "an autocracy" that would have subverted the arbitration function of the French-style presidency, with the NAR describing it as an oligarchic drift. As the NAR's political director, Renouvin also rejected the dichotomy between monarchism and republicanism. He said: "The republic in the profound and philosophical sense of the term is Res Publica. Under my French monarchy, it was always thought like this: public affairs are the common good. The republic is not a particular political regime. It could also have been the regime of the Committee of Public Safety [a government body established in 1793 to preserve the conquests of the French Revolution], the Assembly regime, the Fifth Republic which is an elective monarchy. Monarchy is one of the ways to tend to the common good. Opposing an ideal republic to an ideal monarchy was one of the great stupidities of Maurras. Monarchy is a particular regime; the republic, the ideal of political reason." In reference to his anti-Maurrassisme and about those who associate, directly or indirectly, themselves with the heirs of Action Française of Maurras, which was banned in 1944 due to their support of the Vichy regime and Marshal Philippe Pétain, he said: "We have no relationship with these movements and these nostalgics." In an excerpt from the film that Jean-Christophe Rosé dedicated to his work for the book Les Ghettos du gotha, Olivier de Rohan-Chabot, brother of the politician Josselin de Rohan and president of the Society of Friends of Versailles, states that he feels like the "owner of France" as a member of the French royal family, being cousin of the king. Responding about the argument that many French see monarchism as embodying the vision reflected in Rosé's film and that it is inherently classist, Renouvin said: "So I don't understand this type of thinking. These families no longer have any role, it's a memory ... The historical traces no longer have any meaning.") appealed to his supporters to vote for Mitterrand in both the 1981 and 1988 presidential elections. The NAR's royalism is thus seen to be "compatible with the spirit of 1789, with the rule of law and with the idea of the common good, which claims to be the continuation of the centuries-old 'party of politicians'".

== Organization ==
As of 2007, its headquarters were at 17, rue des Petits-Champs, 75001 Paris, and had 1,500 activists. On 28 March 2012, the NAR registered itself as a political association, citing its new address at 36–38, rue Sibuet 75012 Paris, and stating its goal as to "create a monarchical mood in public opinion; to popularize this idea; to support the action of the princes of the House of France and, in general, to undertake any operation directly or indirectly linked to the object of the association or which may facilitate its extension or development."

== Electoral results ==
=== Presidential ===
Election year	Candidate	1st round			2nd round		
Election year	Candidate	Votes	%	Rank	Votes	%	Rank
1974	Bertrand Renouvin	43,722	0.17%	10th			
1981	François Mitterrand (supported as PS candidate)	7,505,960	25.85%	2nd	15,708,262	51.76%	1st
1988	François Mitterrand (supported as PS candidate)	10,367,220	34.10%	2nd	16,704,279	54.02%	1st
1995	Called for blank votes						
2002	Jean-Pierre Chevènement (supported as MDC candidate)	1,518,528	5.33%	6th			
2007	Called for blank votes						
2012	Nicolas Dupont-Aignan (supported as DLR candidate); François Hollande (supported as PS candidate)	643,907	1.79%	7th	18,000,668	51.64%	1st
2017	Nicolas Dupont-Aignan (supported as DLF candidate)	1,695,000	4.70%	6th	Called for blank votes		
2022	Nicolas Dupont-Aignan (supported as DLF candidate)	718,242	2.07%	9th	Called for blank votes		
