= Monarchism in France =

Efforts to restore the monarchy following its 19th century abolition

Map of Europe showing current monarchies (red) and republics (blue) as of 2025

Monarchism in France is the advocacy of restoring the monarchy (mostly constitutional monarchy) in France, which was abolished after the 1870 defeat by Prussia, arguably before that in 1848 with the establishment of the French Second Republic. The French monarchist movements are roughly divided today into three groups:

1. The Legitimists for the royal House of Bourbon,
2. the Orléanists for the cadet branch of the House of Orléans, and
3. the Bonapartists for the imperial House of Bonaparte

== History ==
Following the French Revolution, the deposition of Louis XVI in 1792 (later execution in 1793) and the establishment of the French First Republic, monarchist sentiment still remained strong among many elements in France as well as among the exiled émigré community abroad. The rise of Napoleon Bonaparte and the creation of the First French Empire further complicated monarchist politics, as some former royalists supported Bonaparte as a stabilizing figure, while others remained loyal to the deposed House of Bourbon. With the fall of Napoleon in 1814, the monarchy was restored in the Bourbon Restoration under Louis XVIII and Charles X, only to be overthrown again in the July Revolution of 1830, which replaced the senior Bourbon line with the more liberal House of Orléans under Louis-Philippe I. The overthrow of Louis-Philippe in the French Revolution of 1848 marked the end of the July Monarchy and the beginning of the Second French Republic. The rise of Louis-Napoleon Bonaparte, whose declaration of the Second French Empire in 1852 as Napoleon III, revived the monarchy in Bonapartist form.

The French tricolore with the royal crown and fleur-de-lys was possibly designed by Henri, comte de Chambord in his younger years as a compromise

Although Napoleon III abdicated and the Third Republic was declared after the 1870 defeat by Prussia, The 1871 Paris Commune was crushed by Orléanist Adolphe Thiers. Legitimists and Orléanists controlled the majority of the Assemblies, supported Patrice de MacMahon, Duke of Magenta as president of the Ordre moral government, and a Third Restoration of the monarchy was expected. However, the intransigence of the Count of Chambord, who refused to abandon the white flag and its fleur-de-lis against the republican tricolore, and the 16 May 1877 crisis forced the legitimists to abandon the political arena, while some of the more liberal Orléanists "rallied" throughout the years of the Third Republic. However, since the monarchy and Catholicism were long entangled ("the alliance of the Throne and the Altar"), republican ideas were often tinged with anti-clericalism, which led to some turmoil during Radical Émile Combes' cabinet in the beginning of the 20th century.

Concerns about monarchists caused the French government to bury the Unknown Soldier of World War I at the Arc de Triomphe, because the Panthéon was associated with the Republic. The Action Française, founded in 1898 during the Dreyfus affair, remained an influential far right movement throughout the 1930s, taking part in the 6 February 1934 riots. Some monarchists, such as Georges Valois who founded the Faisceau, became involved in fascism after the 1926 Papal condemnation of the Action Française by Pius XI.

Monarchists were then active under the Vichy regime, with the leader of the Action Française Charles Maurras qualifying as "divine surprise" the overthrow of the Republic and the arrival to power of Marshal Pétain. A few of them, such as Henri d'Astier de la Vigerie, took part in the Resistance out of patriotic concerns. The Action Française was then dissolved after the war, but Maurice Pujo founded it again in 1947.

Some legitimists had become involved in the traditionalist Catholic movement which arose in the aftermath of the Second Vatican Council and some ultimately followed the 1970 foundation of the traditionalist Catholic Society of Saint Pius X by Marcel Lefebvre. Bertrand Renouvin made a breakaway movement from the Action Française in 1971, the Nouvelle Action Française which became the Nouvelle Action Royaliste, while some legitimists joined Jean-Marie Le Pen's Front National, founded in 1972.

== Current pretenders ==
Flag of France used officially in the Kingdom of France and Bourbon Restoration and still used by legitimists today.

The most recognised pretenders to the French throne for each group are:

- Orléanists: Prince Jean, Count of Paris
- Legitimists: Prince Louis, Duke of Anjou
- Bonapartists: Jean-Christophe, Prince Napoléon, or Charles, Prince Napoléon

== Monarchist groups ==
Monarchism continues to exist in France. The historian Julian T. Jackson wrote in 2001 that "Indeed in the Vendée there are still families today who will not receive descendants of people who bought biens nationaux during the Revolution." Falling into one of the three main monarchist streams, some of the active groups in France today are:

- Action Française (Orleanist / right-wing)
- Nouvelle Action Royaliste (Orleanist / left-wing)
- Alliance Royale (No dynastic choice / right-wing)
- Cercle d'Action Légitimiste (CAL) (Legitimist)
- Union des Cercle Légitimistes de France (UCLF) (Legitimist)
- Bonapartist Central Committee (CCB) (Bonapartist / center-right)

== Republican constitutional framework ==
The only entrenched clause in the Constitution of France, carried on from an 1884 addition to the Constitutional Laws of the Third Republic, prevents any amendment on "the republican form of government", therefore a restoration of the monarchy. As this provision is not itself entrenched, a restoration would be possible within the present legal framework in two stages, the first to remove the entrenchment, the second to alter the form of government.

However, a non-sovereign form of monarchy remains in France, with the three traditional kings of Wallis and Futuna, a small Pacific archipelago organized as three kingdoms, who are granted recognition under article 75 of the Constitution. It became French under colonial status in 1917, from an earlier control as a protectorate, before being incorporated in 1946.

Occasional references to the king or the emperor remain in French law, although they are interpreted as applying to the president, who has replaced the monarch under the present constitution. One famous example used to be article 1 of the Civil Code, which provides for when laws take effect: until 2004, it had remained as last amended at the start of the Restoration in 1816, with updated mentions in brackets in most editions: "Laws are enforceable throughout the French territory by virtue of the promulgation made thereof by the King (the President of the Republic). They shall be executed in each part of the Kingdom (of the Republic) from the moment when their promulgation can be known". It was rewritten in 2004.

In addition, a local civil servant of the French government carries the additional responsibility of "viceroy of Pheasant Island", a small, uninhabited island on the border with Spain organized as a condominium of the two countries, six months a year. The French authorities have stated that this is in a parallel with Spain, which has a monarch. The president of France is also ex officio co-prince of Andorra, a sovereign Pyrenean microstate; the position was passed on from the last French kings, who had held it since Henry IV, who upon his French accession was already co-prince as Count of Foix.
