= Bertrand Renouvin =

French political figure (born 1943)

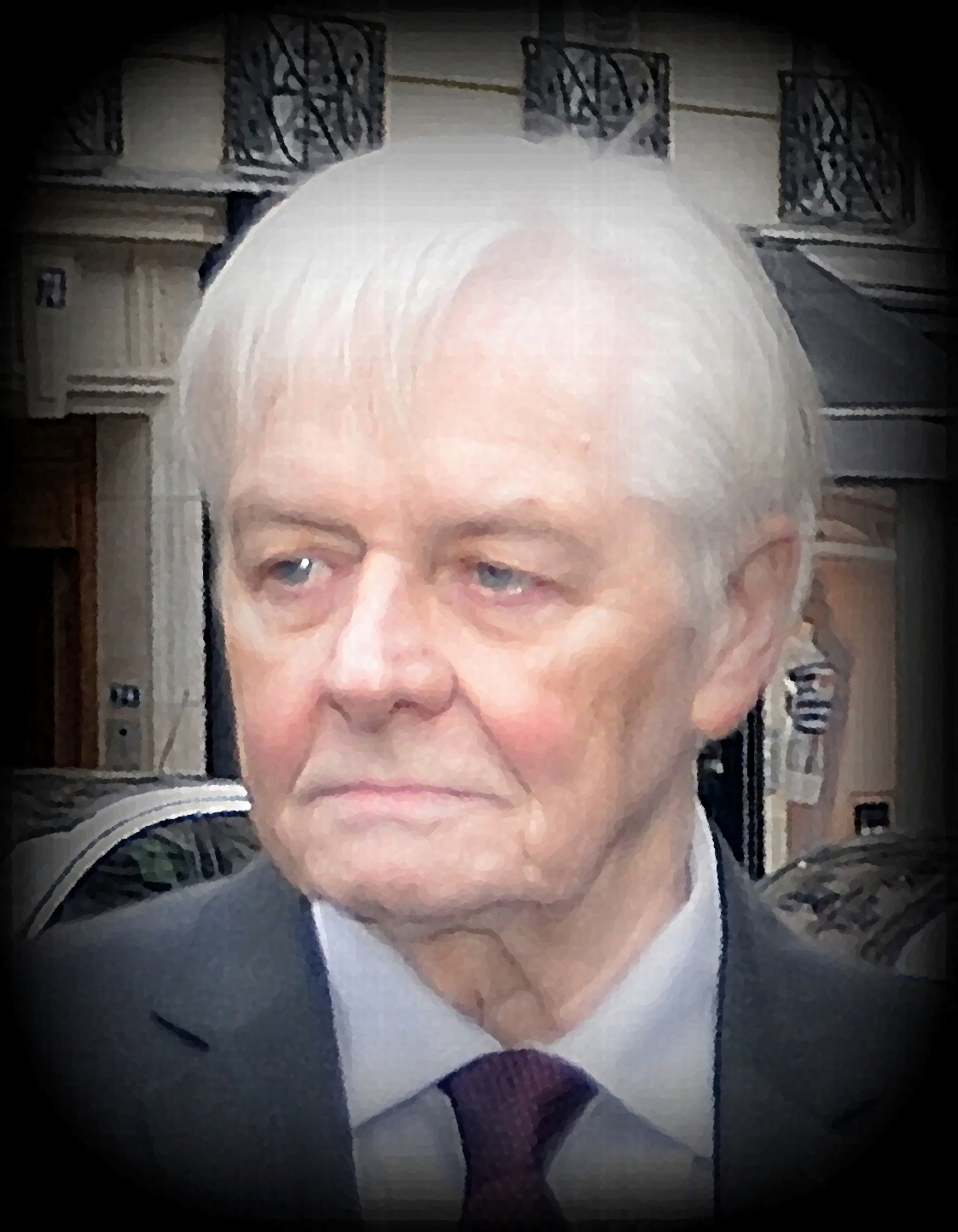
- Born: June 15, 1943 (age 83); Paris, France
- Occupation: political figure
- Known for: founder and president of Nouvelle Action Royaliste
- Parent: Jacques Renouvin (father)

Bertrand Renouvin (French pronunciation: [bɛʁtʁɑ̃ ʁənuvɛ̃]; born 15 June 1943 in Paris) is a French political figure, who is the founder and president of the French political movement Nouvelle Action Royaliste.

== Family ==
Renouvin's father, Jacques Renouvin, was a hero of the French Resistance of World War II. His father was captured and deported to Mauthausen concentration camp, where he died in 1944.

== Royalism ==
The group aims at restoring monarchism in France. On the other hand, Renouvin's political positions have been close to the (centre-)left of the political spectrum, hence his support for François Mitterrand.

Renouvin regularly publishes editorials in "Royalist", the semi-monthly of his movement, in which he professes anti-liberal doctrines. Very close to the Count of Paris, Renouvin is close to king Simeon II of Bulgaria and his souverainism is the result of more than thirty years of public life, at the economic and social council and the leadership of his neo-royalist movement.

=== Elections ===
Bertrand Renouvin was a candidate in the presidential election in 1974, obtaining 0.14% of votes in the first round.

In the presidential elections 1981 and 1988, he supported François Mitterrand, candidate of French Socialist Party.

At the time of the last presidential elections (2002), Renouvin chose to support the candidature of Jean-Pierre Chevènement, the only souverainist able in Renouvin's view to gather the good will of both left and right for the purpose of regaining France her position in the world. Thus, Renouvin was also member of Pôle Républicain, a committee of different politicians across the spectrum that supported Chevènement's candidature.

=== Bibliography ===
- Pourquoi combattre ?, directed by Pierre-Yves Rougeyron, Éditions Perspectives Libres, Paris, Janvier 2019.
