= Maurice Pujo =

French journalist

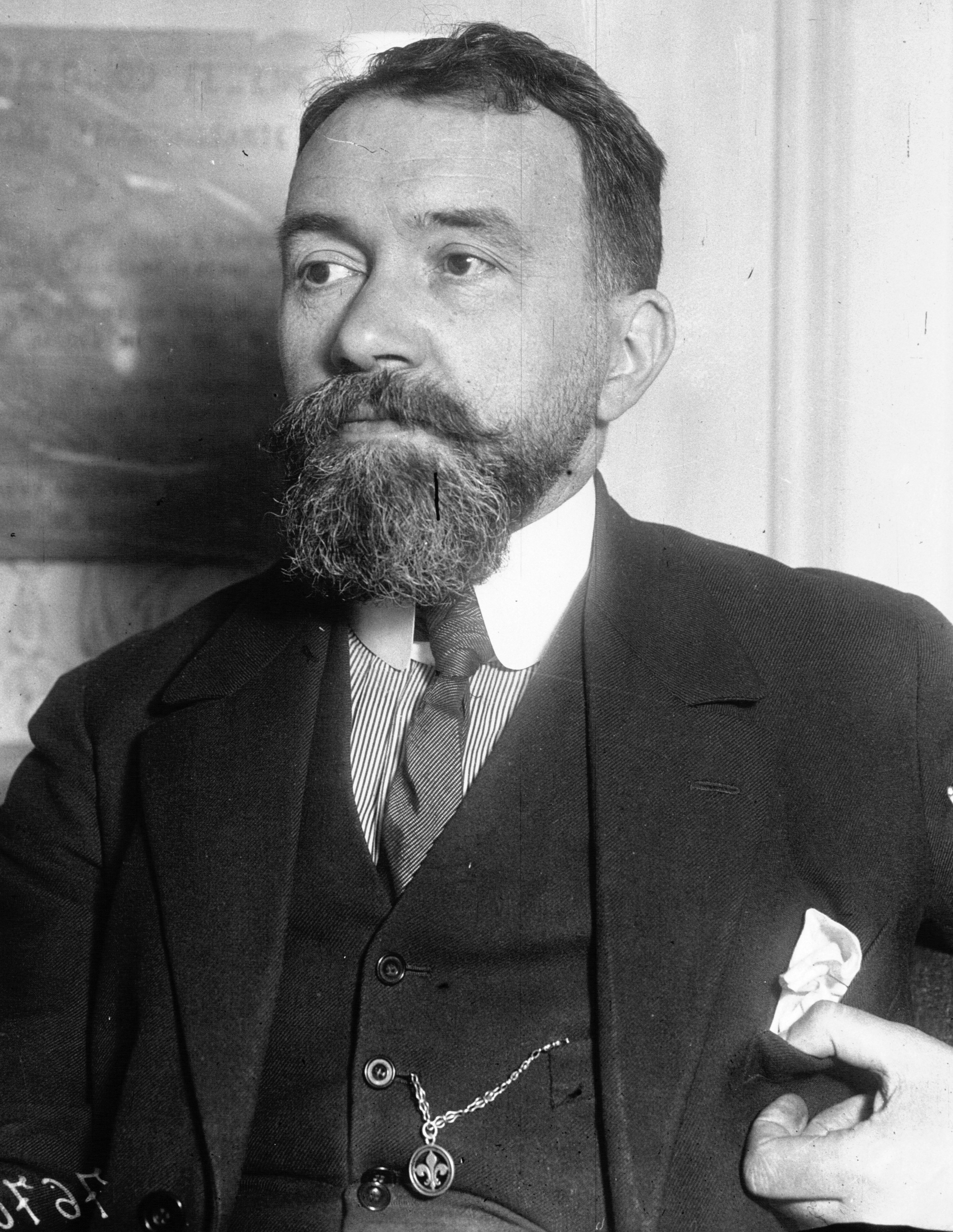
- Born: 26 January 1872; Lorrez-le-Bocage-Préaux, Seine-et-Marne, France
- Died: 6 September 1955 (aged 83); Ferrières-en-Gâtinais
- Education: Université de Paris
- Occupations: Journalist, politician
- Organization: Action française Ligue de la patrie française Union pour la vérité
- Known for: Co-founder of Action Française Launched the journal La Revue jeune, later renamed L'Art et la Vie
- Notable work: Le règne de la grâce (essay) La Guerre et l'Homme
- Movement: Action Française
- Children: 1

Maurice Pujo (French: [mɔʁis pyʒo, moʁ-]; 26 January 1872 – 6 September 1955) was a French journalist and co-founder of the nationalist and monarchist Action Française movement. He became the leader of the Camelots du Roi, the youth organization of the Action Française which took part in many right-wing demonstrations in the years before World War II (1939–45). After World War II he was imprisoned for collaborationist activity.

== Life ==
=== Early years ===
Maurice Pujo was born on 26 January 1872. His family was Catholic and royalist. Pujo studied at the lycée in Orléans at the same time as Charles Péguy. When he was eighteen he won a prize for an essay on Spinoza's moral philosophy. He expected to make a career as a literary critic. He launched the journal La Revue jeune, later renamed L'Art et la Vie, which lasted for a few years. He was fluent in German, very interested in German culture and an ardent follower of Richard Wagner. In 1894 he published his first book, Le règne de la grâce, an essay inspired by the philosophy of the German philosopher Novalis that was praised by the Socialist leader Jean Jaurès. He visited Germany as a student in the 1890s. The experience turned him against German influence and made him a French nationalist.

=== Anti-Dreyfusard ===
In April 1898, at the height of the Dreyfus affair, the circle of leftist intellectuals to which Pujo belonged became supporters of Alfred Dreyfus. Maurice Pujo and Henri Vaugeois left this group. Late in 1898 Vaugeois, Pujo and a few other nationalists who met at the Café de Flore founded the Comité d'action française (Committee of French Action). Three of this group, Louis Dausset, Gabriel Syveton and Vaugeois, opposed to the League for the Rights of Man and Dreyfus, launched a petition that attacked Émile Zola and what many saw as an internationalist, pacifist left-wing conspiracy. In November 1898 their petition gained signatures in the Parisian schools, and was soon circulated throughout political, intellectual and artistic circles in Paris.

On 19 December 1898 Pujo published an article that first used the term L'Action française (French Action) in the daily paper L'Éclair in which he declared that the dispute over Dreyfus was damaging France's vital interests, and called for maintenance of the traditions of the homeland. He said the purpose of the Action française should be "to remake France, republican and free, into a State as organized at home, as powerful abroad, as it was under the Ancien Régime." The decision to create the nationalist anti-Dreyfusard Ligue de la patrie française (League of the French Homeland) was made on 31 December 1898. The Comité d'action française was soon merged into the League, which was led by Jules Lemaître.

=== Action Française ===
The circle around Vaugeois soon became disillusioned with the League, which lacked any clear doctrine. Vaugeois disagreed with Lemaître's plan to participate in the next legislative elections. The Comité d'action française was recreated in April 1899, and the foundational conference of the Action Française movement was held on 20 June 1899 in Paris. In his keynote speech at this meeting Vaugeois declared that the movement stood for "anti-Semitic, anti-Masonic, anti-parliamentary and anti-democratic" nationalism. Charles Maurras soon joined the Action Française. Maurras thought the Bourbon monarchy should be restored, using violence if needed. Pujo came to agree with Maurras. He wrote later, "Under the mortal blows of Charles Maurras, the republicanism of each of us succumbed one by one in this year, 1900, which was the year of the hegira for the Action Francaise."

On 16 November 1908 Lucien Moreau and Maurice Pujo created the Camelots du Roi youth movement. Maxime Real del Sarte was a co-founder. In the autumn of 1908 Pujo led the Camelots in a series of nationalist demonstrations ostensibly against a Sorbonne student named Thalamas who had insulted Joan of Arc. He remained director of the Camelots from 1908 to 1939. During World War I (1914–18) Pujo was called up and served on the front. In 1920 Pujo said the Sorbonne was still dangerously infatuated with German culture, and was infiltrated by "foreigners, spies, Jews and Bolsheviks." He called for dismissal of faculty members who he thought were pro-German such as Victor Basch, Charles Seignobos and Aulard. He continued to lead demonstrations by the Camelots du Roi into the 1930s, notably the demonstrations about the Stavisky Affair of January and February 1934.

During World War II (1939–45) when the Germans occupied France Pujo stayed with Maurras in Lyon. After Léon Daudet died in 1942 Pujo was made co-director of the daily Action Française. He was imprisoned by the Gestapo for three weeks in June 1944. In January 1945 Pujo and Maurras were tried for collaboration and Pujo was sentenced to five years in prison. He was released in October 1947. He then became political director of Aspects de la France until his death on 6 September 1955. Pujo has been called "a kind of exalted flunky and right-hand man for Maurras."

Pujo's son, Pierre Pujo led Action Française until his death on 10 November 2007.

== Works ==
- Le Règne de la Grâce (1894).
- Après l’Affaire (1898).
- Essais de Critique Générale de la Crise Générale (1898).
- Contre la Classe de Philosophie de l'Enseignement Secondaire (1899).
- Les Nuées (1908).
- Les Cadres de la Démocratie. Pourquoi l’on a Étouffé l’Affaire Valensi? (1912).
- La Politique du Vatican (1928).
- Comment Rome s’est Trompée. L’Aggression Contre l’Esprit (1929).
- La Guerre et l’Homme (1932).
- Les Camelots du Roi (1933).
- La Veillée (1934).
- Le Problème de l’Union (1937).
- Comment La Rocque a Trahi (1938).
- Charles Maurras et Maurice Pujo devant la Cour de Justice du Rhône les 24, 25, 26 et 27 janvier 1945 (5 vols., 1945).
- L’Action Française Contre l’Allemagne. Mémoire au Juge d’Instruction (1946).
- Au Grand Juge de France. Requête en Révision d’un Arrêt de Cour de Justice (with Charles Maurras, 1949).
- Vérité, Justice, Patrie. Pour Réveiller le Grand Juge. Seconde Enquête en Révision d’un Arrêt de Cour de Justice (with Charles Maurras, 1951).

== Sources ==
- Cépoy, Jacques (Spring 1999), "Maurice Pujo", L'Action Française 2000 - Numéro hors-série (in French), archived from the original on 2016-03-03
- Conner, Tom (2014-04-24), The Dreyfus Affair and the Rise of the French Public Intellectual, McFarland, ISBN 978-0-7864-7862-0
- Curtis, Michael (2015-12-08), Three Against the Third Republic: Sorel, Barres and Maurras, Princeton University Press, ISBN 978-1-4008-7928-1
- d'Appollonia, Ariane Chebel (1998-12-01), L'extrême-droite en France: De Maurras à Le Pen, Editions Complexe, ISBN 978-2-87027-764-5
- Ferri, Laurent (2008-02-05), "Lucien Moreau (1872–1935)", Jewish Identities: Nationalism, Racism, and Utopianism in Twentieth-Century Music (in French), University of California Press, ISBN 978-0-520-25088-8
- Hanna, Martha (1996), The Mobilization of Intellect: French Scholars and Writers During the Great War, Harvard University Press, ISBN 978-0-674-57755-8
- Nickerson, Hoffman (October 1935), "French Royalism", The American Review, 5 (5)
- Osgood, Samuel M. (2013-11-21), French Royalism Since 1870, Springer, ISBN 978-94-017-5071-4
- Pierrard, Pierre (1998), Les Chrétiens et l'affaire Dreyfus, Editions de l'Atelier, ISBN 978-2-7082-3390-4
- Weber, Eugen (1962), Action Française: Royalism and Reaction in Twentieth Century France, Stanford University Press, ISBN 978-0-8047-0134-1
