= Action Française =

French royalist political movement

French Action Action française
- Abbreviation: AF
- General Secretary: Olivier Giot
- Founders: Maurice Pujo; Charles Maurras; Henri Vaugeois; George de Villebois-Mareuil
- Founded: 20 June 1899; 127 years ago
- Split from: Ligue de la patrie française
- Headquarters: 10 rue Croix-des-Petits-Champs, 75001 Paris
- Newspaper: L'action française; La Restauration Nationale
- Student wing: Fédération nationale des étudiants d'Action Française
- Youth wing: Camelots du Roi
- Women's wing: Ladies of the French Action
- Think tank: Institut d'Action française
- Membership: 3,000 (early 2018 est.)
- Ideology: Orléanism; National conservatism; Historical doctrine: List; Maurrassisme; Corporate statism; National syndicalism; Anti-parliamentarism; French integralism
- Political position: Far-right
- Religion: Catholicism
- International affiliation: International Monarchist Conference
- Colours: Royal blue Gold
- Slogan: "All that is national is ours"
- Anthem: La Royale

Website
- actionfrancaise.net

Action française (French pronunciation: [aksjɔ̃ fʁɑ̃sɛːz], AF; English: French Action) is a French far-right, monarchist, and nationalist political movement with strong historical connections to Catholicism. It sought the restoration of French national unity and pride under a restored monarchy and, under the influence of its principal ideologist Charles Maurras, developed a counter-revolutionary opposition to the legacy of the French Revolution, anti-parliamentarianism, support for decentralisation, corporatism, integralism, and Catholicism.

The movement arose in the aftermath of the Dreyfus affair. Maurice Pujo and Henri Vaugeois founded the movement and its associated journal, L'Action française, in 1899 as a nationalist reaction against the intervention of left-wing intellectuals on behalf of Alfred Dreyfus. Maurras soon joined and became its principal ideologist. The journal was converted into a daily newspaper in 1908, and the movement also created other organizations in an effort to influence public opinion. The paper was sold by its youth organization, the Camelots du Roi. Action française was at its most prominent between 1899 and 1914.

The movement conceived France as possessing a national soul and character which, in its view, had been damaged by the Republic through the place it accorded to Jews, foreigners, Freemasons, and Protestants. Although leading figures, particularly Maurras, included atheists and freethinkers, Action française valued the conservative traditionalism of Catholicism and what it regarded as the Church's powerful capacity for social control. This attracted many Catholics, while the extremity of the movement's views, especially in the context of the rise of other fascist movements in Europe, alarmed others. Attempts to secure its condemnation by Rome were delayed by the First World War, but Catholic involvement in the movement was prohibited in 1926. During the interwar period it retained some prestige through support among conservative elites, but its popularity gradually declined amid the rise of fascism and the rupture in its relations with the Catholic Church.

During the Second World War, Action française revived under and supported the Vichy regime of Marshal Philippe Pétain between 1940 and 1944. After the fall of Vichy, its newspaper was banned. Maurras was sentenced to life imprisonment in 1944, released in 1951, and died in 1952, while he was formally reprieved in 1952.

The movement nevertheless continued after 1945 through new publications and political associations, although its importance declined as monarchism lost popularity and the French far right increasingly emphasized Catholic values and the defence of traditional French culture. It has been regarded by some as a progenitor of the contemporary National Rally political party.

== History ==
=== Founding and rise (1898–1914) ===
In 1899, Maurice Pujo and Henri Vaugeois left the French nationalist movement Ligue de la Patrie française and established a new one, called Action française, and its official journal, Revue de l'Action Française. This was their nationalist reaction against the intervention of left-wing intellectuals on the behalf of Alfred Dreyfus.

The royalist militant Charles Maurras quickly joined Action Française and became its principal ideologist. Under the influence of Maurras, the movement became royalist, counter-revolutionary (objecting to the legacy of the French Revolution), anti-parliamentary, and pro-decentralization, espousing corporatism, integralism, and Catholicism. The Dreyfus affair gave some French Catholics the impression that Catholicism is not compatible with democracy. Therefore, they regarded Action Française as rampart of religion and the most fitting expression of the church doctrine regarding society.

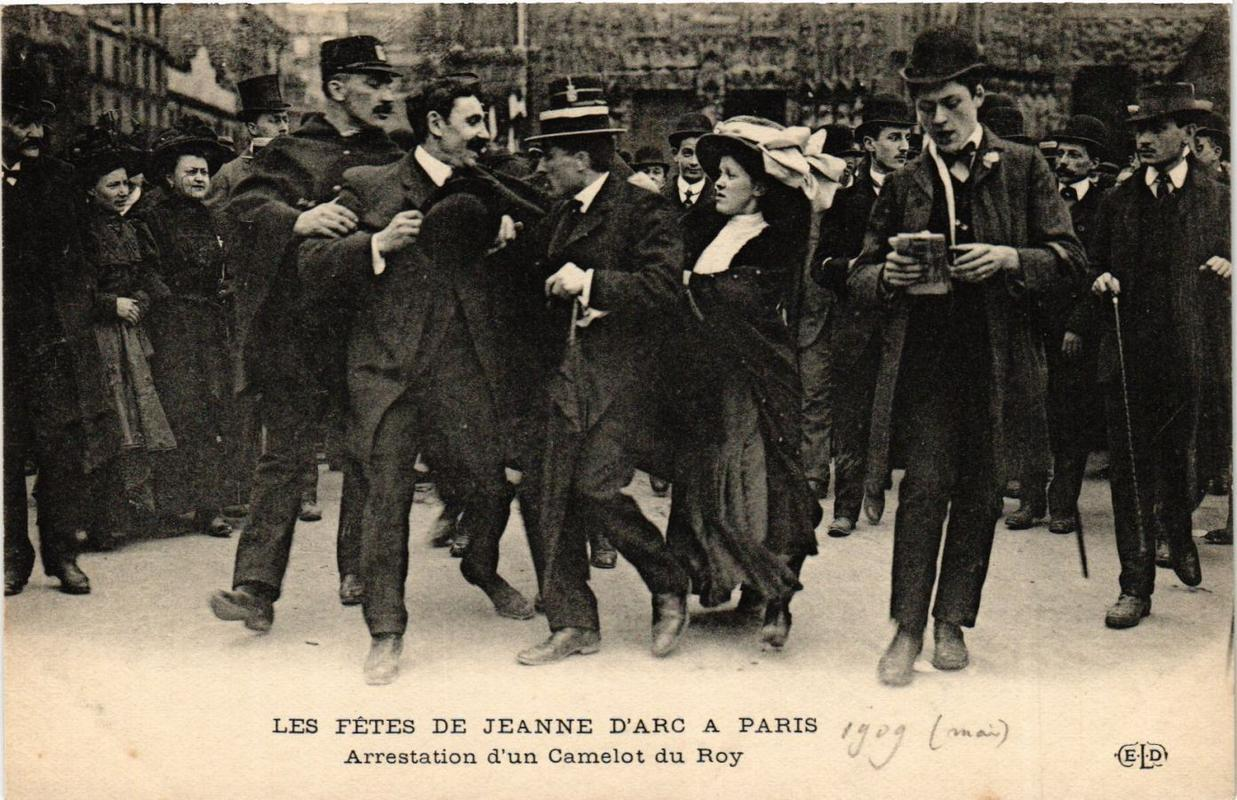
Arrest of a Camelot du Roi on the feast day of Joan of Arc on the fore-court of Notre-Dame. Postcard, 1909

In its early years, Action Française tried to influence public opinion and to spread its ideas. For example, it created related organisations, such as student groups. The political organisation of the movement, the Ligue d'Action Française, was launched in the spring of 1905, as was the Action Française Federation of Students, directed by Lucien Moreau. L'Institut d'Action française was created in 1906 as an alternative institute for higher education. In 1908 the movement's periodical was turned to a daily newspaper, called simply Action Française. Camelots du Roi, the movement's youth wing, was created in the same year to sell the newspaper in the streets. Its members also served as a paramilitary wing, providing security for meetings and engaging in street violence with political opponents. The newspaper's literary quality and polemical vigor attracted readers and made Maurras and the movement significant figures in French politics. By 1914, Action française had become the best structured and the most vital nationalist movement in France.

=== First World War and aftermath (1914–1926) ===
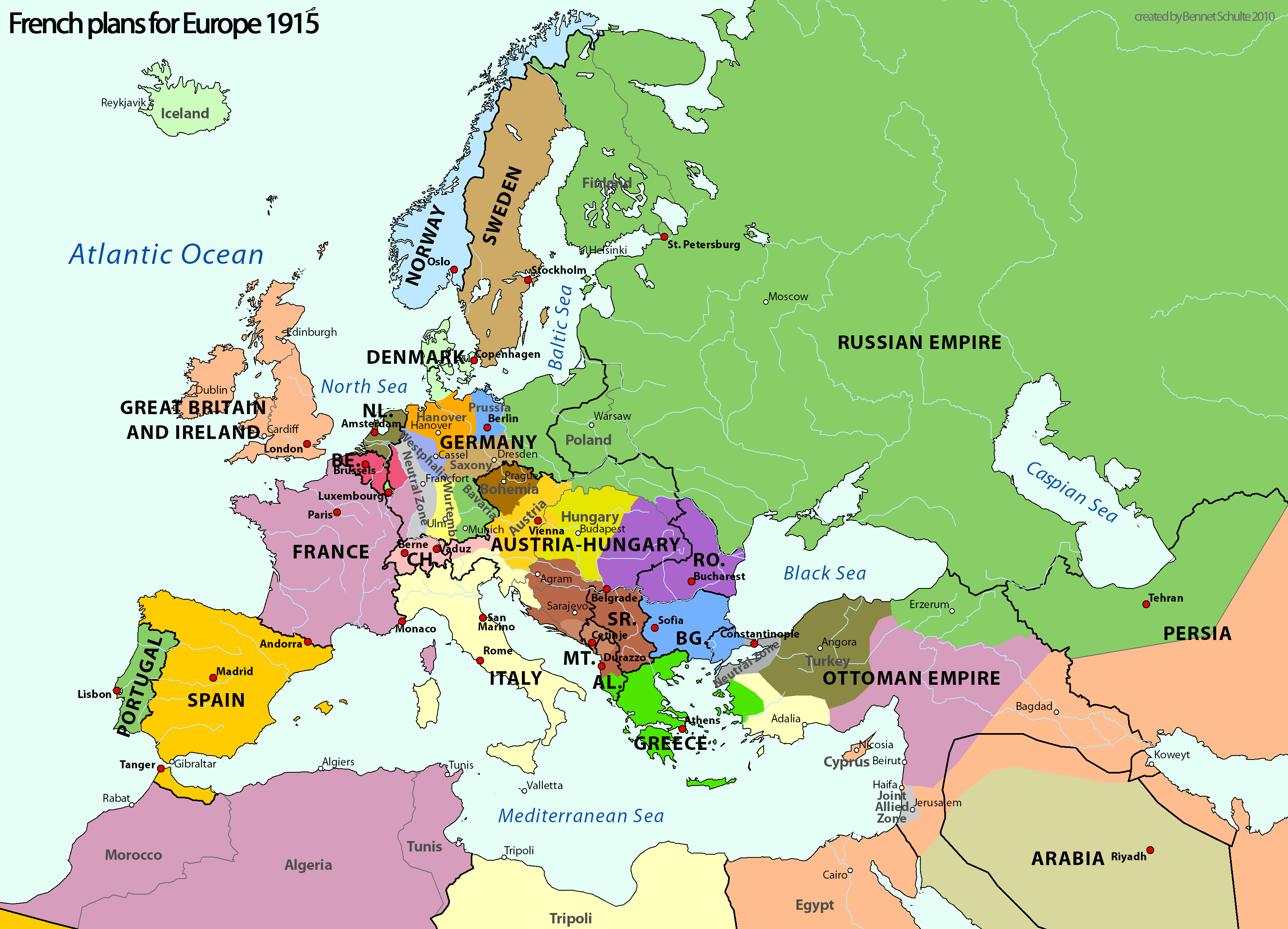
A French propaganda poster from 1915 displaying an imaginary map of post-WWI Europe: the German Empire is partitioned into several states, France gains former German territories to the east, while Switzerland incorporates western Austria within its borders.

During the First World War, Action Française supported the Prime Minister Georges Clemenceau and the will to defeat the Germans. France's victory in the war and the movement's anti-German intransigence on the peace terms set forth by the Treaty of Versailles (1919) between Germany and the Allied Powers resulted in a peak of success, prestige and influence during the interwar period. For example, in 1917 it moved into new spacious offices on the rue Caumartin, near St. Lazare train station. However, in the French legislative elections of 16 November 1919 Bernard de Vésins, president of the Ligue d'Action Française, was defeated in the first district of Paris.

Action française exploited the disquiet aroused on the right by the victory of the left-wing coalition (Cartel des Gauches) founded by the Radical politician Édouard Herriot in 1924 and the fear of communism (see also: Red Scare), sending about thirty candidates to the French Parliament. Well-known French writers endorsed the movement, which advertised itself as the thinking man's party. Literary reviews, especially Revue universelle, spread the message of Action française. The polemics of the review, its personal attacks on leaders, and its systematic exploitation of scandals and crises helped detach some of the intellectuals from their allegiance to the French Republic and democracy. This agitation culminated in the 6 February 1934 crisis. The successes shaped the ideology of Action française; hence, it became more integrated into mainstream conservatism, stressing patriotism and Catholicism as opposed to monarchism.

=== Papal condemnation and decline ===
In spite of the movement's support for Catholicism as the state religion of France, and the fact that the vast majority of its members were practising Catholics (including significant numbers of clergymen), some French Catholics regarded it with suspicion and distrust. Much of this was due to the influence of Maurras, an agnostic who advocated Catholicism as a factor of social cohesion and stability and a vital element of French tradition. This rather utilitarian view of religion disturbed many who otherwise agreed with him. Its influence on younger generations of French Catholics was also considered unwholesome. Thus, Pope Pius XI condemned Action française on 29 December 1926.

Several of Maurras's writings were placed on the Index Librorum Prohibitorum at the same time, on 9 January 1927, with Action française being the first newspaper ever placed on the Catholic Church's list of banned books. This was a devastating blow to the movement. On 8 March 1927, AF members were prohibited from receiving the sacraments. Many of its members left the movement and were forced to look for a different path in politics and life, such as writers François Mauriac and Georges Bernanos, and it entered a period of decline.

In 1939, following the Spanish Civil War and a revival of anti-communism within the Catholic Church, Pope Pius XII decided to end the condemnation. Thereafter, Action française claimed that the condemnation had been declared for political purposes.

=== Interwar revival ===
Despite the 1926 Papal condemnation, Action française remained popular during the interwar period, being one of the most important far-right leagues in France, along with the Croix-de-Feu and others. As increasing numbers of people in France (as in Europe as a whole) turned to authoritarian political movements, many French citizens joined the Action française. It thus continued to recruit members from the new generations, such as Robert Brasillach (who would become a collaborationist during the Second World War), the novelist and former deputy and ambassador Pierre Benoist, Thierry Maulnier, and Lucien Rebatet. It was marginally represented for a time in the Chamber of Deputies, particularly by Léon Daudet, elected in the right-wing conservative coalition Bloc National (1919–1924).

However, with the rise of fascism in Europe and the creation of seemingly fascist leagues, added to the 1926 Papal condemnation, the royalist movement was weakened by various dissidents: Georges Valois would create the short-lived fascist movement Faisceau; Louis Dimier would break away, while other members (Eugène Deloncle, Gabriel Jeantet, etc.) created La Cagoule, a far-right terrorist organization.

The retired Admiral Antoine Schwerer became president of the league in 1930, succeeding Bernard de Vésins in difficult circumstances. He was a talented orator. At the December 1931 congress, "greeted by loud acclamation", he gave himself to a full presentation of "the general situation of France", external, financial, economic, interior and religious. He concluded with a passionate statement,

... the situation is very dark. It would be almost desperate if there were not a cell that is not huge, but that is alive and is the only one able to animate the amorphous environment that surrounds it. This cell is the Action française. Every day more people understand it. There will always be imbeciles in France, men of bad faith, madmen and criminals; but there are in our midst a great many excellent elements now deceived and blinded. Our task is to enlighten them and then to train them to the assault. It requires a huge effort pursued with perseverance. The job is tough. We will not do it by sitting in a good armchair, in flowery salons, lavishing sweet smiles and honeyed words, fighting in white gloves with dainty foils. We must be ready for hard sacrifices. Are you all ready? You want the restoration of the Monarchy. Have you all done what is necessary to achieve this?

Antoine Schwerer was forced by illness to retire to Brittany in 1935. He was succeeded as head of the league by François de Lassus.

John Gunther wrote that of the more than 100 daily newspapers in Paris, only L'Humanité and Action française were honest. The group participated in the 6 February 1934 crisis, which led to the fall of the second Cartel des Gauches and to the replacement of the centre-left Radical-Socialist Édouard Daladier by the centre-right Radical Gaston Doumergue. In foreign policy, Maurras and Bainville supported Pierre Laval's double alliance with Benito Mussolini's Fascist Italy and with the United Kingdom in the Stresa Front (1935) on one side, and with the Soviet Union on the other side, against the common enemy Nazi Germany. The Action française greeted Franco's appearance with delight, and supported the self-proclaimed Caudillo during the Spanish Civil War (1936–1939). But the extra-parliamentary agitation brought by the far-right leagues, including the AF, led Pierre Laval's government to outlaw militias and paramilitary leagues, leading to the dissolution of the AF on 13 February 1936 – the other leagues were dissolved only in June 1936 by the Popular Front.

Marshal Philippe Pétain's proclamation of the Vichy Regime and of the Révolution nationale after the failure of the Battle of France was acclaimed by Maurras as a "divine surprise", and he rallied the collaborationist government. Royalist members hoped that Pétain would restore the monarchy, and the headquarters of the movement were moved from Paris to Vichy. However, the AF members were split between supporting the collaborationist regime and their nationalist sentiment: after 1942, and in particular in 1943, some members, such as Henri d'Astier de la Vigerie, Pierre Guillain de Bénouville, and Honoré d'Estienne d'Orves either joined the French Resistance or escaped to join the Free French Forces. Others actively collaborated, while Maurras supported the Vichy Regime, but theoretically opposed Pétain's collaboration with the Germans. After the Liberation of France, he was condemned to life imprisonment in 1944, although he was reprieved in 1952. Action française was dissolved in 1944.

=== Post-1944 developments ===
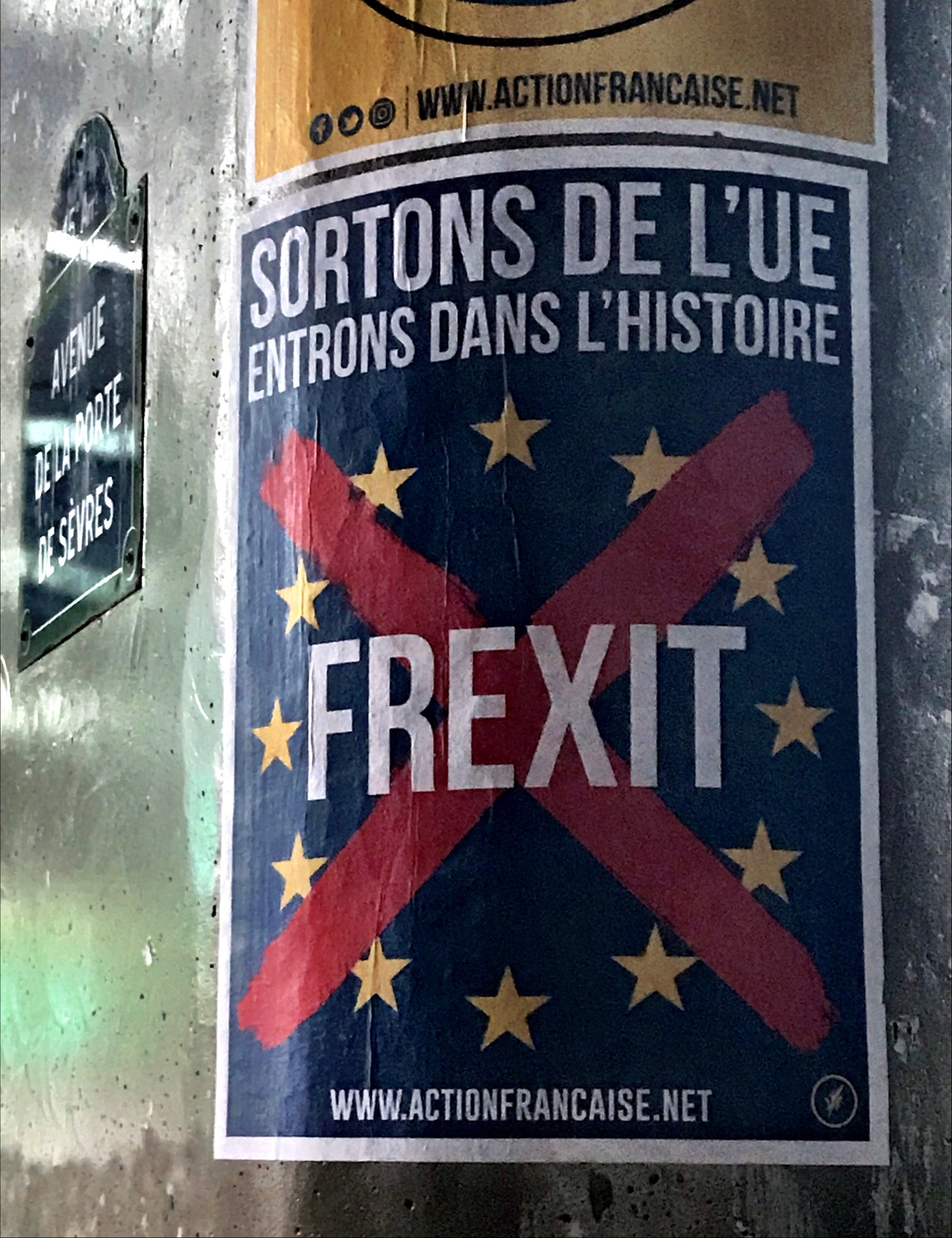
Election campaign poster by Action Française in favour of the withdrawal of France from the European Union.

Following the fall of the Vichy regime, the original Action française newspaper was banned, and Charles Maurras was sentenced to life imprisonment in 1944, though he was released in 1952. The movement restructured in 1947 under Maurice Pujo, who founded the newspaper Aspects de la France and the counter-revolutionary organization Restauration Nationale. Despite diminishing relevance due to the decline of monarchism, the movement maintained influence through publications and associations. In 1971, the split of the Nouvelle Action française, which later evolved into the Nouvelle Action Royaliste, highlighted the divergence within monarchist circles, as younger leaders sought to modernize its doctrines.

By the late 20th century, figures associated with the movement, such as Pierre Pujo, continued its legacy with journals like L'Action française 2000. Although it no longer commands significant political clout, the movement has influenced contemporary right-wing currents in France, including the National Rally, due to its focus on Catholic values and preserving traditional French culture.

== Ideology ==
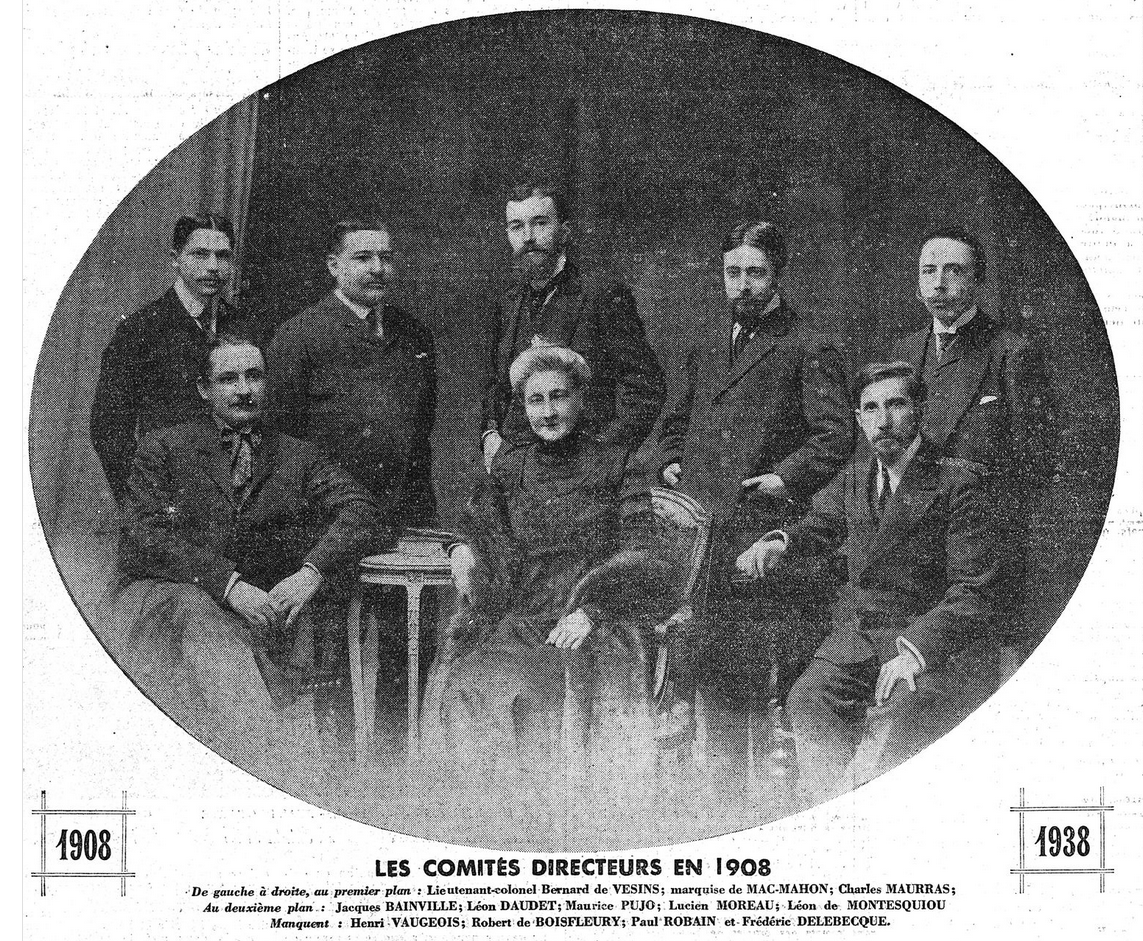
Steering committee of Action française in 1908, with Marthe de Vogüé seated in centre.

The ideology of Action française was dominated by the precepts of Charles Maurras, following his adherence and his conversion of the movement's founders to monarchism. The movement supported a restoration of the House of Bourbon-Orléans and, after the 1905 law on the separation of Church and State, the restoration of Roman Catholicism as the state religion, all as rallying points in distinction to the Third Republic of France which was considered corrupt and atheistic by many of its opponents.

The movement advocated decentralization (a "federal monarchy"), with the restoration of pre-Revolutionary liberties to the ancient provinces of France (replaced during the Revolution by the departmental system). It aimed to achieve a restoration by means of a coup d'état, probably involving a transitional authoritarian government.

Action française was not focused on denouncing one social or political group as the conspiratorial source of ills befalling France. Different groups of the French far-right had animuses against Jews, Huguenots (French Calvinists), and Freemasons. To these, Maurras added unspecific foreigners residing in France, who had been outside French law under the Ancien Régime, and to whom he invented a slur name derived from ancient Greek history: métèques. These four groups of "internal foreigners" Maurras called les quatre états confédérés and were all considered to be part of "anti-France". He also opposed Marxism and the October Revolution, but antagonism against them did not have to be manufactured.

== Judgment of political scientists ==
=== Classification as fascist ===
In 1965, the German historian Ernst Nolte claimed that Action française was a fascist movement. He considered Action française to be the first fascist party in European history.

Certain present-day scholars disagree with Nolte's view. For example, in 1999, the British historian Richard Thurlow claimed that "his [Nolte's] linking of Action française to the fascist tradition was misleading". Later, René Rémond and Stanley G. Payne described the differences between Action française and Italian fascism.

=== Influence on national syndicalism and fascism ===
In the books Neither Right nor Left and The Birth of Fascist Ideology, Zeev Sternhell claimed that Action française influenced national syndicalism and, consequently, fascism. According to Sternhell, national syndicalism was formed by the combination between the integral nationalism of Action française and the revolutionary syndicalism of Georges Sorel. National syndicalism spread to Italy, and was later a part of the doctrine of Italian fascist movement. In France, national syndicalism influenced the non-conformists of the 1930s. Based on the views of the non-conformists themselves, Sternhell argued that the non-conformists were actually a French form of fascism.

=== René Rémond's classification ===
Although it supported the Orléanist branch, according to historian René Rémond's categorization of French right-wing groups, AF would be closer to the legitimist branch, characterized by a complete rejection of all changes to France since the 1789 French Revolution. According to Rémond, supporters of the Orléanist branch tended to favour economic liberalism.

== See also ==
- Anti-parliamentarism
- French Third Republic (1870–1940)
- Hussards, literary movement created in the 1950s in reaction against existentialism
- Monarchism in France
- National Rally (RN)
- Nouvelle Action Royaliste (NAR)

== Sources ==
- Callu, Agnès (28 January 2008), Lettres à Charles Maurras: Amitiés politiques, lettres autographes, 1898-1952 (in French), Presses Univ. Septentrion, ISBN 978-2-7574-0044-9
- DeClair, Edward G. (1999). Politics on the Fringe: The People, Policies, and Organization of the French National Front. Duke University. ISBN 978-0-8223-2139-2.
