= Camelots du Roi =

French far-right youth organization

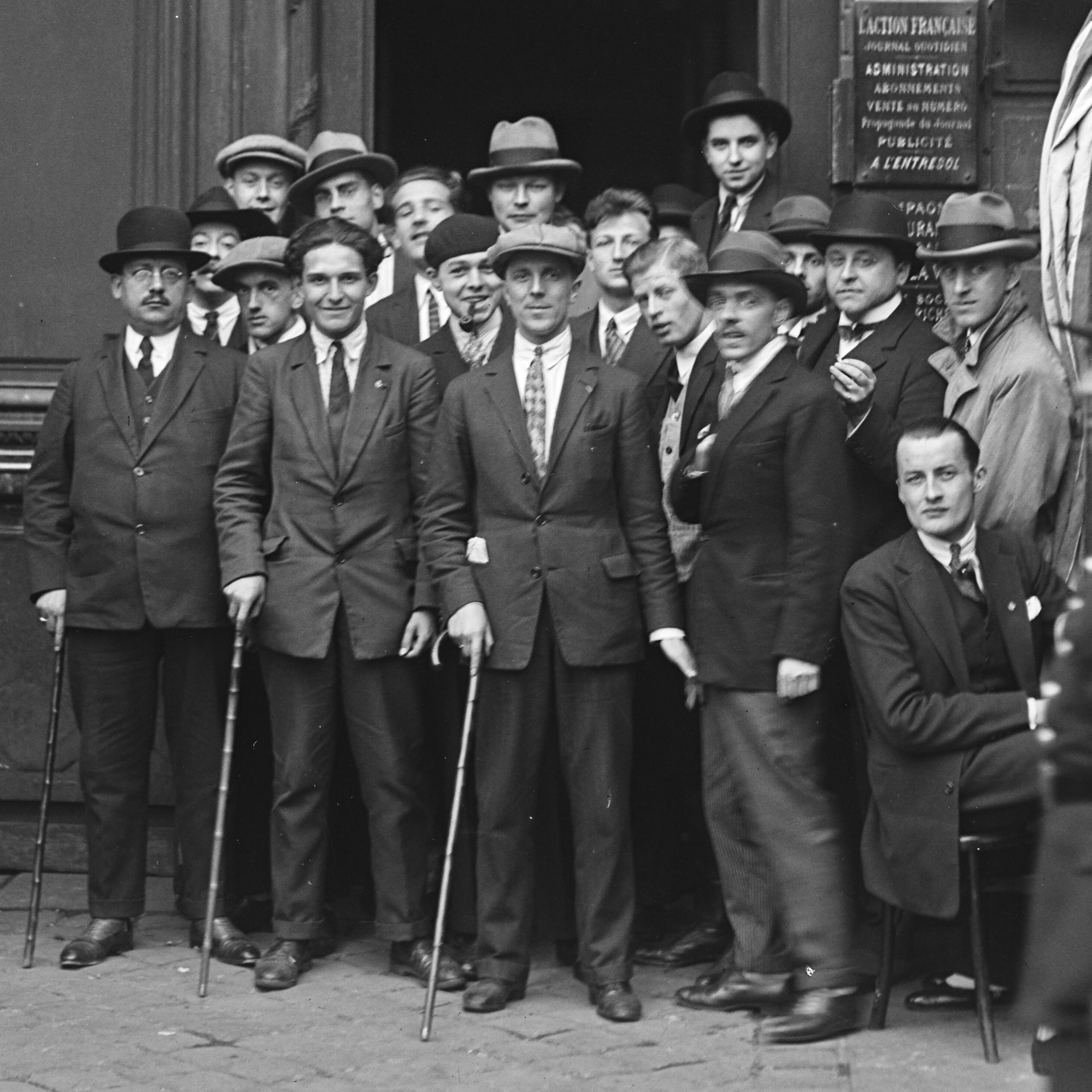
- Camelots du Roi in front of the headquarters of Action Française, rue de Rome, 11 June 1927.
- President: Maxime Real del Sarte (1908-1936)
- Vice President: Lucien Lacour (1908-1936)
- Secretary General: Marius Plateau (1908-1923); Pierre Lecœur (1923-1930); Philippe Roulland (1930-1932); Georges Calzant (1932-1936)
- Treasurer: André Guignard (-1932); Jules Keller (1932-1936)
- Founded: 16 November 1908
- Dissolved: 13 February 1936
- Headquarters: France
- Ideology: • Integral nationalism • Royalism
- Mother party: Action Française

The King's Camelots, officially the National Federation of the King's Camelots (French: Fédération nationale des Camelots du Roi) was a far-right youth organization of the French militant royalist and integralist movement Action Française active from 1908 to 1936. It is best known for taking part in many right-wing demonstrations in France in the 1920s and 1930s.

== History ==
=== Genesis ===
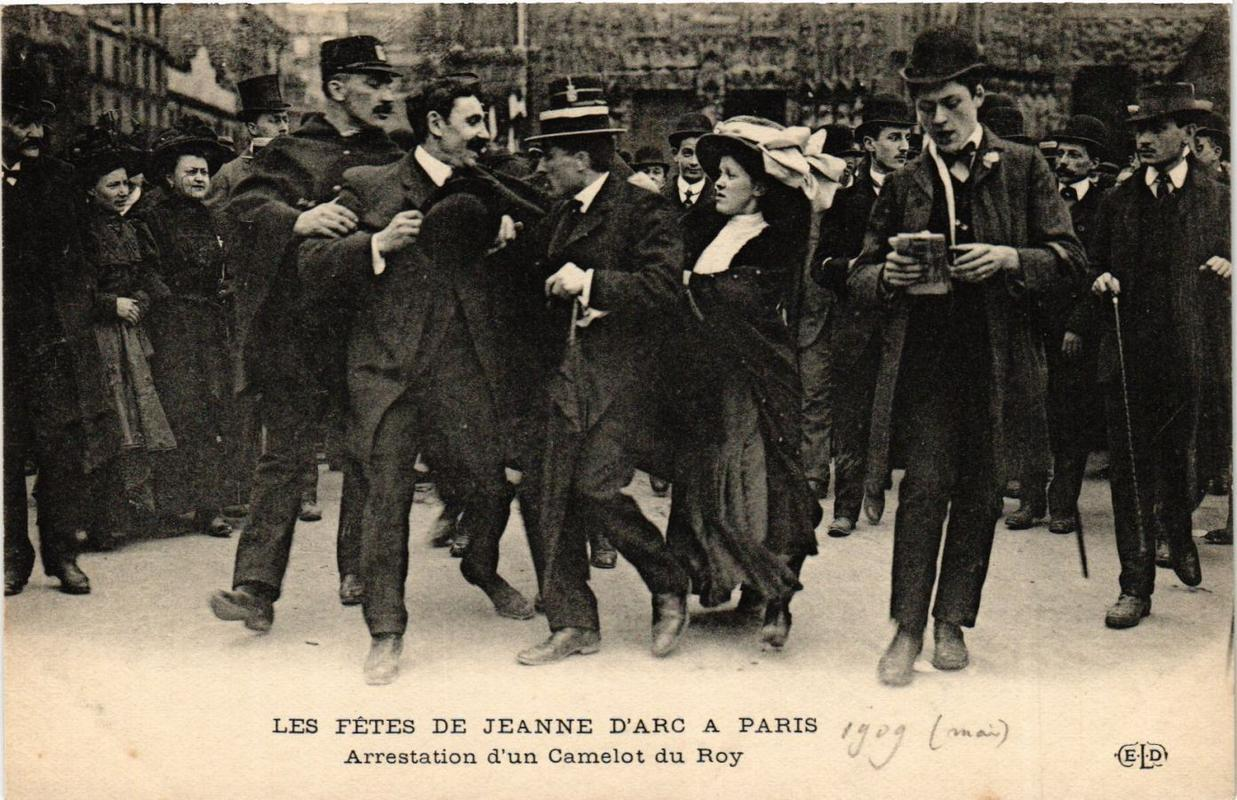
Arrest of a Camelot du Roi on the feast day of Joan of Arc on the fore-court of Notre-Dame. Postcard, 1909.

In 1908, the Action française sought to equip itself with a youth militant organization. Commander Louis Cuignet prospected in the ranks of the army in search of a forceful leader. In the end he chose Maxime Real del Sarte, a student at the Beaux-Arts Academy, after his notorious performance in the Court of Cassation. In the aftermath of the Dreyfus affair, the young Real del Sarte undertook to publicly insult the judges during a hearing presided over by the public prosecutor Alexis Ballot-Beaupré:

"Unworthy, fraudulent magistrates, it will not be said that no Frenchman would throw in your face your dereliction and your infamy!"

Created on 16 November 1908, the name "Camelots du Roi" first used in L'Action française daily newspaper to designate the newspaper sellers of the Gazette de France, L'Accord social and L'Action française. The name means "street-hawkers of the king" and does not refer to the legendary locale of Camelot. They were recruited on the one hand from the royalist group of the XVIIe district of Paris organized by Henry des Lyons to sell newspapers at church doors, and on the other hand from among the royalist workers and employees of L'Accord social of Firmin Bacconnier.

Few in number at the start, the first police reports mention about fifty members in January 1909. At the end of 1909, the police counted around 400.

On 21 November 1908, the Camelots du Roi disrupted a reading-tribute dedicated to Émile Zola at the Odéon.

During the winter of 1908 to 1909, the Camelots du Roi damaged or even destroyed statues erected in Paris or in the provinces representing Dreyfusards or Republicans.

The Camelots were the instrument of a policy of tumult on the part of Action Française. They were much more an armed force than a force of political proposal. The idea was to stir up trouble to remind public opinion of the royalist cause and thus bring in new recruits. The members of Les Camelots had great admiration for Charles Maurras as a writer and as a politician. He was their indisputable master, even if some gradually marginalized their position within Action Française, without however questioning their affiliation with this movement. The first president of the King's Camelots was named Maxime Real del Sarte, while Henry des Lyons was the national secretary. Marius Plateau, Lucien Lacour, Armand du Tertre, Lucien Martin, Léon Géraud, Jean Dorange were appointed delegates. The man who decided the relationship of the Camelots with the central organization of Action Française, as well as discipline, was Maurice Pujo.

=== Thalamas affair ===
In 1904, the history professor Amédée Thalamas enjoyed a small reputation for having relativized the political role of Joan of Arc during the Hundred Years War and questioned her virtue as well as the supernatural character of the virgin of Orleans. He had received a reprimand from the Minister of Public Instruction. In November 1908, the Council of Professors of the Faculty of Letters, chaired by Dean Alfred Croiset, authorized Thalamas, who did not have the title of Doctor of Letters, to provide a free course once a week throughout the winter on history pedagogy. This course was divided into twelve small courses. Trained by Maxime Real del Sarte, the Camelots du Roi decide to interrupt the lesson given by the professor every Wednesday, even if it meant resorting to violence.

During the first lesson, on 2 December 1908, students and Camelots invaded the Michelet amphitheater and caused a hellish uproar. Maxime Real del Sarte grabbed Thalamas and slapped him. He fled. The young people left the room, spread out on the boulevard Saint-Michel, broke through the police roadblocks, crossed the Seine, and arrived at the statue of Joan of Arc, where they laid a wreath of flowers.

On 9 December, the royalists demonstrated more vigorously at the Sorbonne.

On 23 December, wanting to rehabilitate Joan of Arc, Maurice Pujo undertook to devote a free course to her in the middle of the Sorbonne, in the Guizot amphitheater. He traced in front of his listeners a historical picture, comparing the state of France in the 15th century with that of his time. He was wrapping up when a peace officer, followed by a Captain of the Guard and a line of soldiers, asked him to come out. The listeners dispersed without incident.

The first trial against a Camelot du Roi took place on 24 December: Serge Real del Sarte, a student at the Ecole des Beaux-Arts, was accused of "violence against an agent". The same day, a group of 500 demonstrators, led by his brother Maxime and the Camelots, headed for the Senate and invaded the courtyard of the palace to cries of "Down with the republic!" to make themselves known. The Camelots du Roi did not hesitate to be voluntarily arrested in order to appear in a public trial and to get press.

On 31 December, Maxime Real del Sarte was sentenced to fifteen days in prison for "insulting agents".

On 16 February 1909, the professor was spanked in the middle of class, which became a "true feat of arms for the Camelots du Roi".

The campaign against Thalamas lasted three months, with numerous arrests for insults and violence against agents: in addition to those of Maurice Pujo and Maxime Real del Sarte, his brother Yves, Henry des Lyons, Marius Plateau, Georges Bernanos and dozens of anonymous Camelots du Roi were arrested, then released after spending a fortnight in prison.

The Thalamas affair aroused passionate reactions; the thalamist and anti-thalamist camps confronted each other again during the year 1909. The Republican Federation of Students of France, led by Edmond Bloch, tried to obstruct the Camelots du Roi. This episode is part of a period of "mythification" of Joan of Arc in French nationalist circles; it was one of the first feats of the Camelots du roi.

Recruited among the student population, they made the Latin Quarter their fief. The Camelots were involved in many brawls and street-fights against left-wing organizations or competing far-right organizations. They were originally directed by Maxime Real del Sarte, president of the National Federation of the Camelots du Roy. This royalist youth organization included popular figures such as Catholic writer Georges Bernanos, Théodore de Fallois, Armand du Tertre, Marius Plateau, Henri des Lyons and Jean de Barrau, member of the directing committee of the National Federation, and particular secretary of the duke of Orléans (1869–1926), the son of the Orleanist count of Paris (1838–1894) and hence the Orleanist heir to the throne of France.

=== Exchanges with anarchists ===
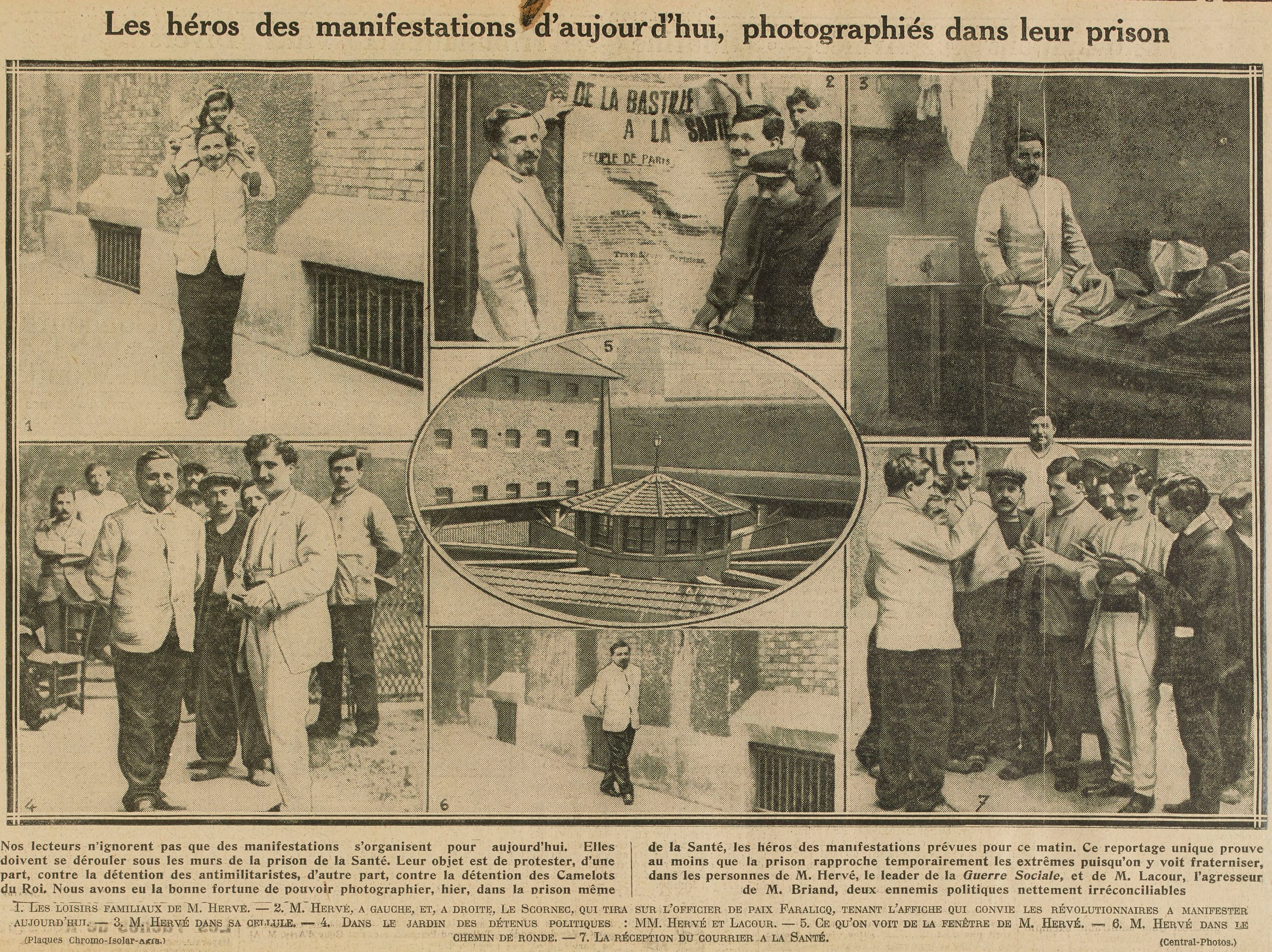
Lucien Lacour, Gustave Hervé and syndicalists fraternize in La Santé Prison.

In the 1910s, the Camelots du Roi briefly befriended the extreme left, in particular the anarcho-syndicalists. Activists from both sides sympathized in prison and discovered a common enemy: the Republic. For example, the Camelot du Roi Georges Bernanos was arrested on 14 January, 8 February and 10 March 1909. During his last arrest, he was sentenced to 10 days in prison and a 25-franc fine. He recounted his incarceration and his fraternization with revolutionary militants:

At La Santé, where we stayed, we fraternally shared our provisions with the navvies, we sang together, everything to everything: Long live Henry IV or L'Internationale.

— Georges Bernanos,

There were all the same some hitches between the Camelots du Roi and anarchists, as illustrated by the testimony of the Camelot du Roi Georges Moyrizot, which nuances this prison friendship:

During the day we were in the political regime, with the people of La Guerre sociale, Almereyda, Méric, Merle (du Merle blanc), Delannoy, designer of the Men of the day, and about thirty trade unionists, strong and hard that Georges tried to convince. One day, a mad fight! I arrive just in time to see Bernanos taken by the throat by a giant who, his fist raised, was about to crush his face. I jumped up, grabbed a chair, and, my strength increased tenfold by rage, broke it on the beefy man's head, who collapsed. General fight. The guards run up with their revolvers. Everyone is put in a cell.

— Georges Moyrizot,

This relationship deepened in the Cercle Proudhon supported by Henri Lagrange, but the urgency of the war quickly put an end to this rapprochement.

=== 1910 floods ===
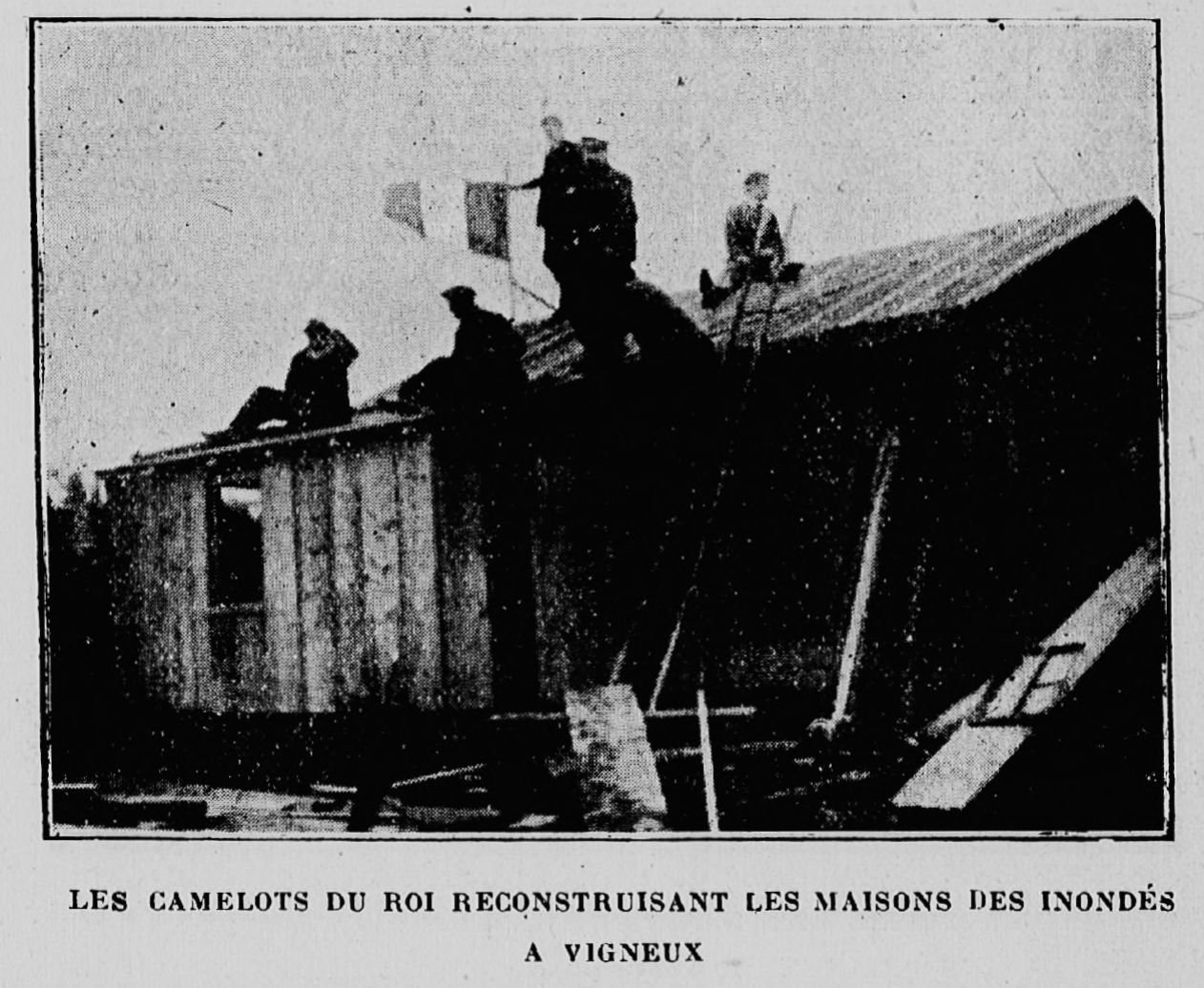
The Camelots du Roi rebuild the houses of the flooded at Vigneux in the Almanach de l'Action française of 1911.

During the 1910 Seine flood, the Camelots du Roi helped the victims in various ways: soup kitchens, distribution of coal and clothing, ferries to cross or bring the victims to safety, collection of donations. The Camelots du Roi imagine themselves "in the most working-class neighborhoods, in the reddest suburbs of the outskirts with a certain guts, sometimes expelled by a stubborn police commissioner, as in Javel, or by a mayor [...] like in Issy-les-Moulineaux ». In the suburbs of Issy-les-Moulineaux, the Action Française soup kitchen provided a thousand meals a day and the Camelots du Roi provided regular assistance to 172 families for a total of 882 people. Maurice Pujo gives an account of these events in the Almanach de l'Action française of 1911. From February 17 to April 20 in Vigneux, the Camelots du Roi build and furnish twenty-five barracks for workers, with the help of the Marquise de Mac Mahon and the Association of Young Royalist Girls.

Previously, Action française had financed barracks to rehouse the victims of the earthquake of June 11, 1909 in the South of France.

=== The coup of Lucien Lacour ===
On the night of November 19 to 20, 1910, Camelots plastered the walls of Brest with a poster entitled Les Gloires de la République, which depicted a fat Jewish woman — wearing a Phrygian cap and Masonic garb, and attacked with virulence the Chairman of the Board Aristide Briand and Joseph Reinach nicknamed "Reinach Boule-de-Juif" (stings about his overweight, in reference to a short story by Maupassant titled Boule de Suif). The next day, Lucien Lacour managed to slap Briand twice, shouting:

Down with the Republic! Long live the king ! Down with Briand, supporter of Lafferre, the fichards and Israel against our country!

On 6 December 1910, Lucien Lacour was sentenced to three years in prison. He was finally released on 16 January 1912 after 422 days in prison. On 23 April 1912, the Camelots of King Henri Bourgoin and Norbert Pinochet freed Gabriel de Baleine, another imprisoned activist. They phone the director of the Central House of Clairvaux pretending to be the President of the Council. The stratagem will inspire telephonist Charlotte Montard a few years later.

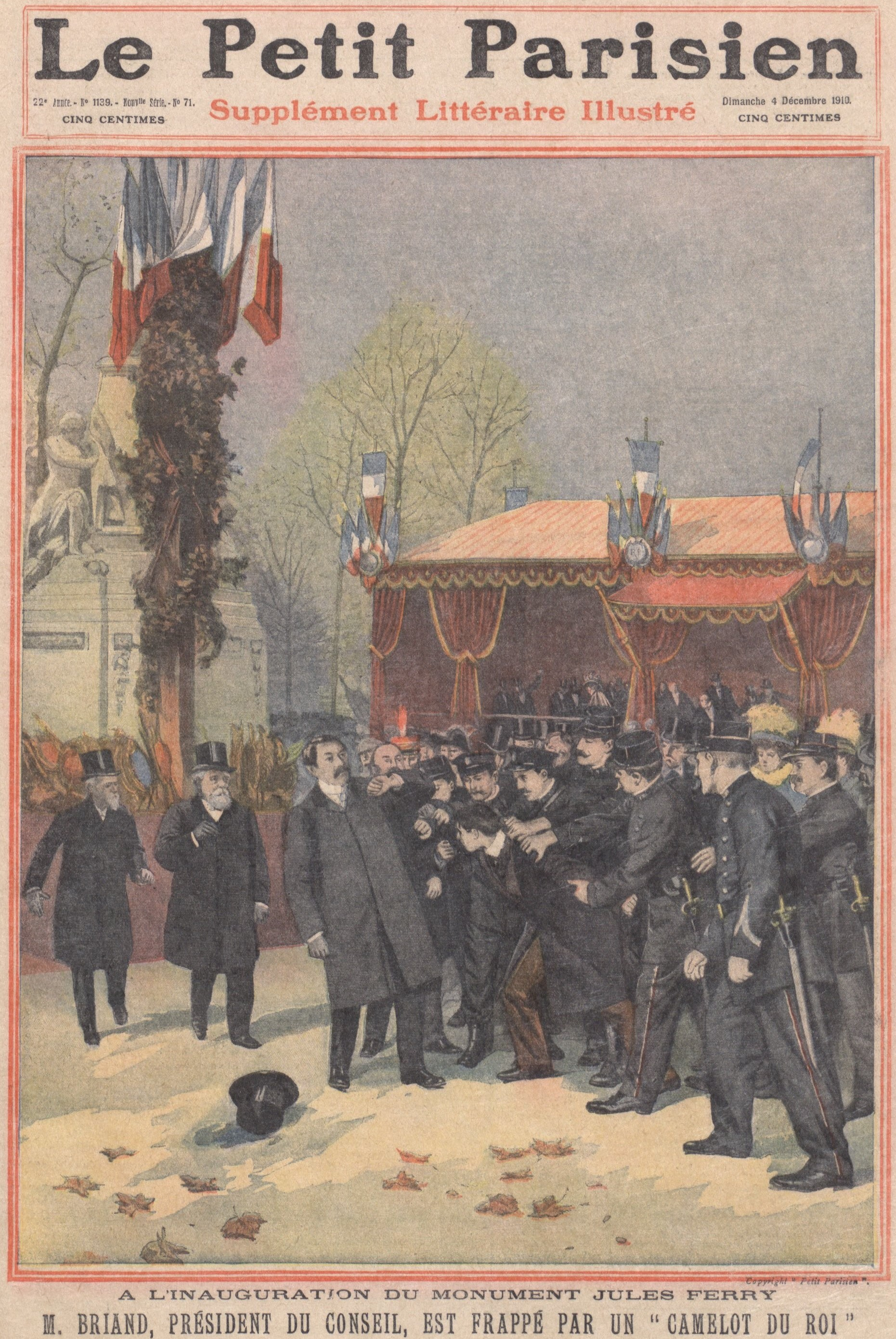
Lucien Lacour slaps Aristide Briand in Le Petit Parisien, December 4, 1910.

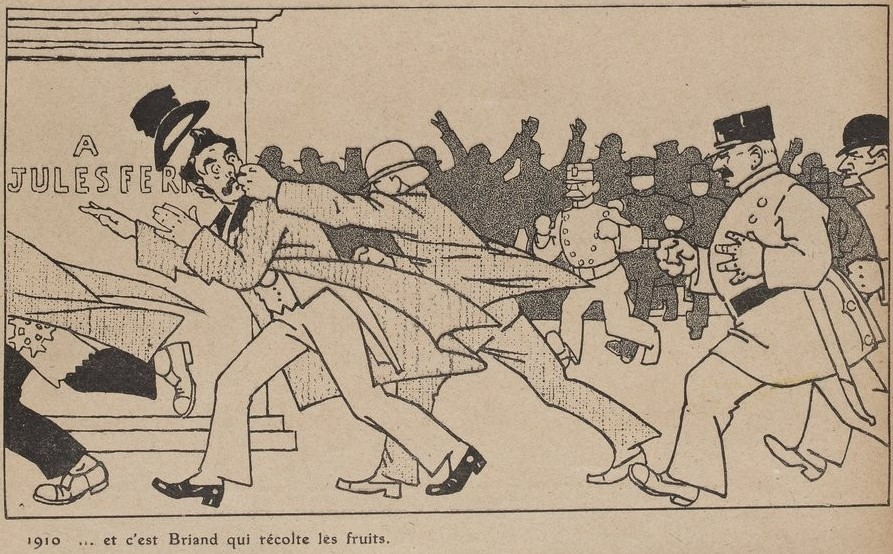
Caricature by Lucien Lacour correcting Aristide Briand in L'Assiette au beurre, March 25, 1911

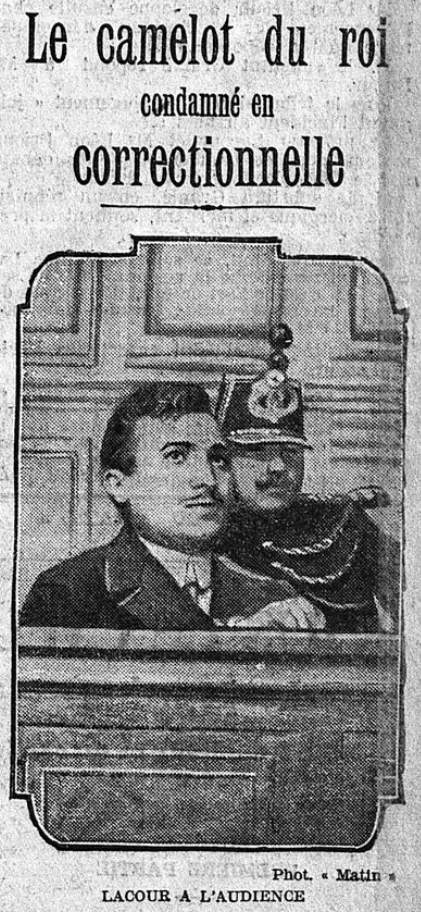
Lucien Lacour in Le Matin of December 7, 1910

=== Protests at Comédie-Française ===
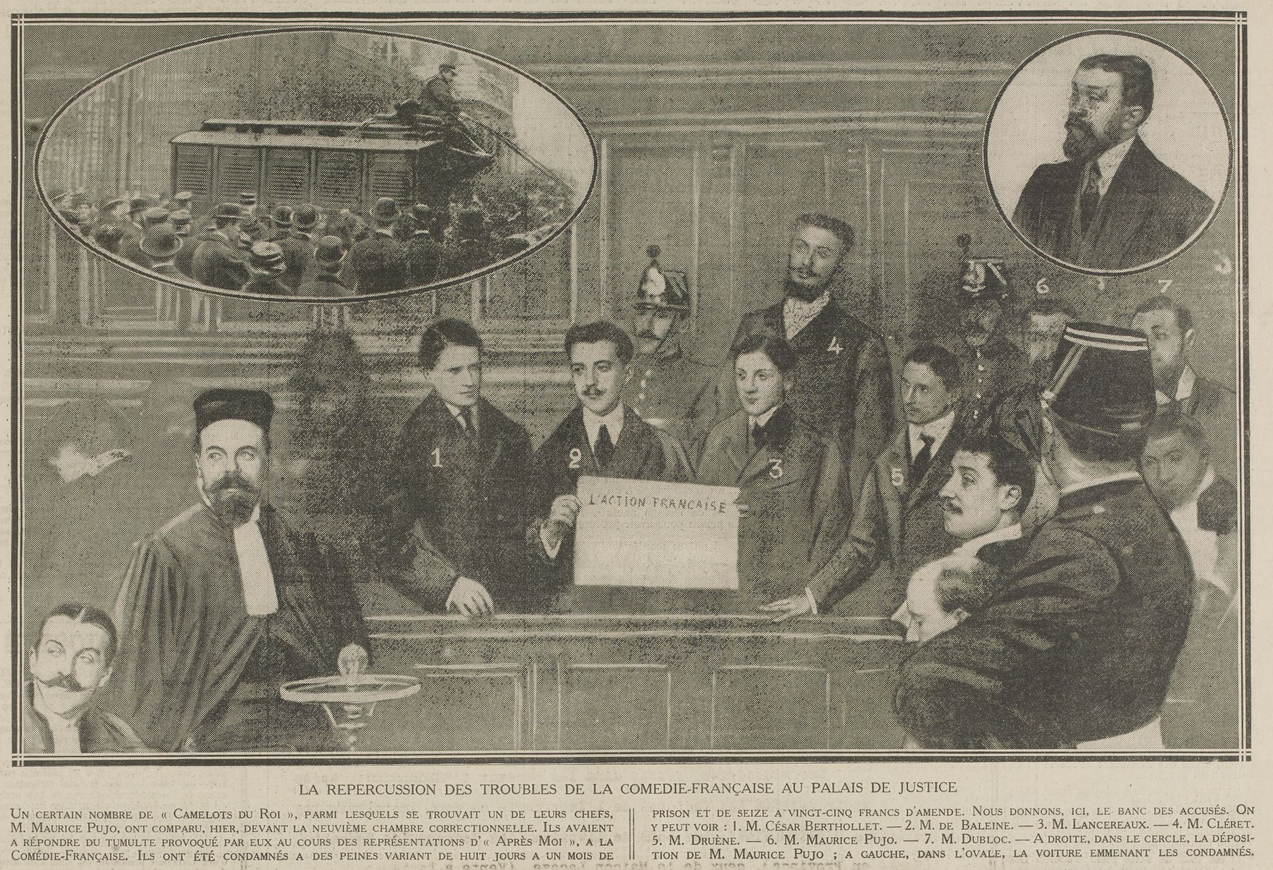
The Camelots du Roi at the courthouse on 4 March 1911.

In February 1911, Henry Bernstein presented his play Après moi at the Comédie-Française. As soon as the first performance was announced, the Camelots du Roi put up posters reproducing a letter in which Henry Bernstein boasted of having deserted During the second performance on 21 February 1911, Maurice Pujo and several Camelots du Roi were arrested while heckling the play. Each performance gives rise to demonstrations of Action Française. On 3 March, the play is deprogrammed. On 4 March, Maurice Pujo was sentenced to one month in prison and a 25 franc penalty, César Berthollet to eight days and 16 franc, while the other Camelots du Roi received suspended prison sentences and a few francs penalty.

On 22 June 1911, Henry Bernstein feeling offended by an article by Léon Daudet, the two men faced off in a duel. On 26 July 1911, a second duel pitted Maurice Pujo against Henry Bernstein.

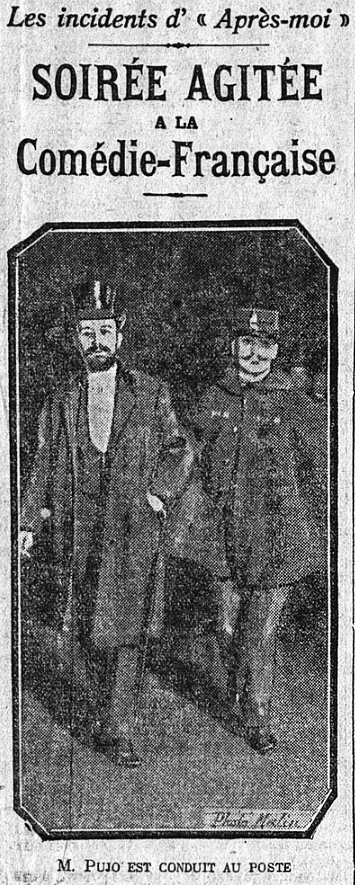
Maurice Pujo is taken to the polisce station on February 20, 1911

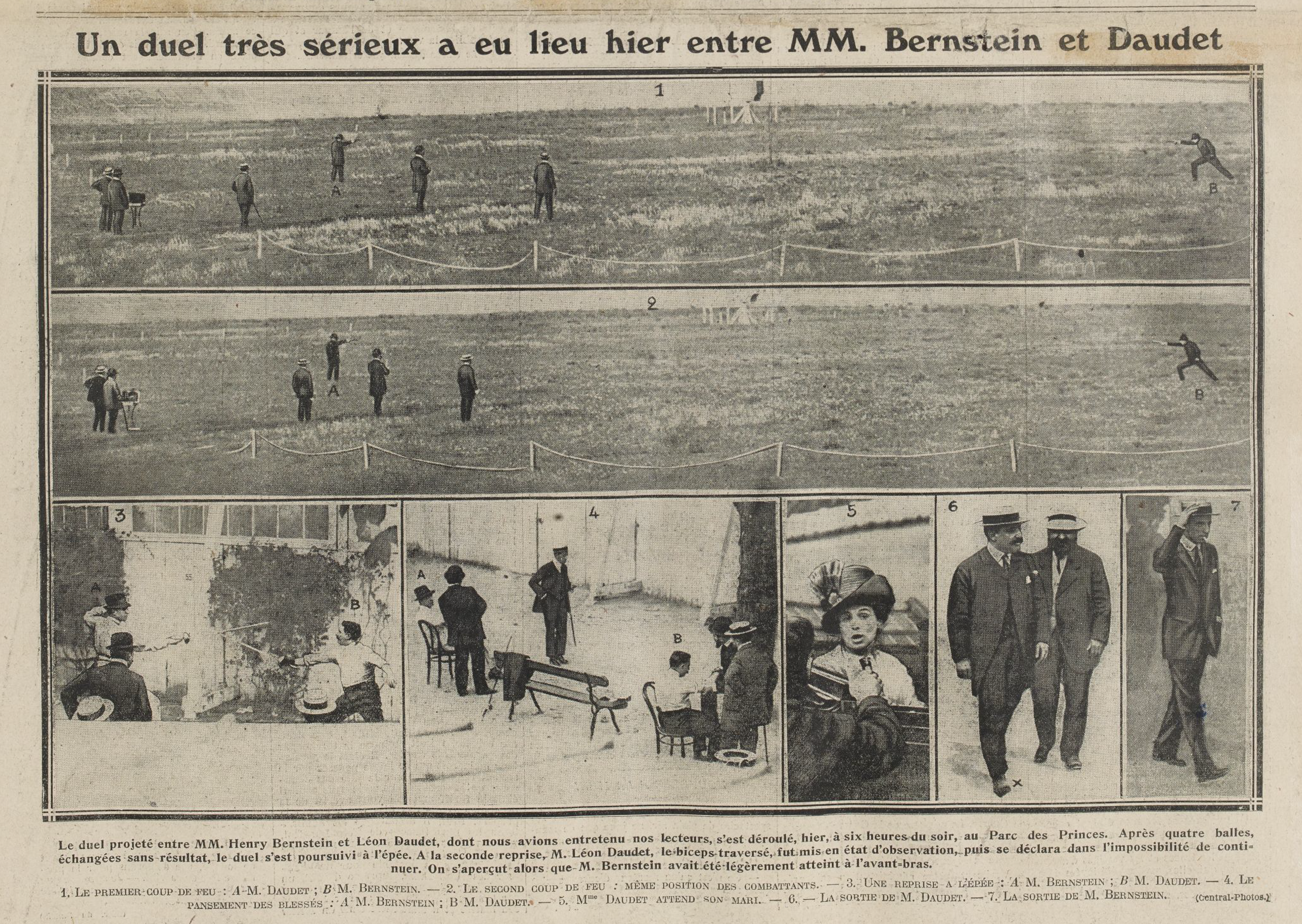
Duel between Léon Daudet and Henry Bernstein in Excelsior on June 22, 1911

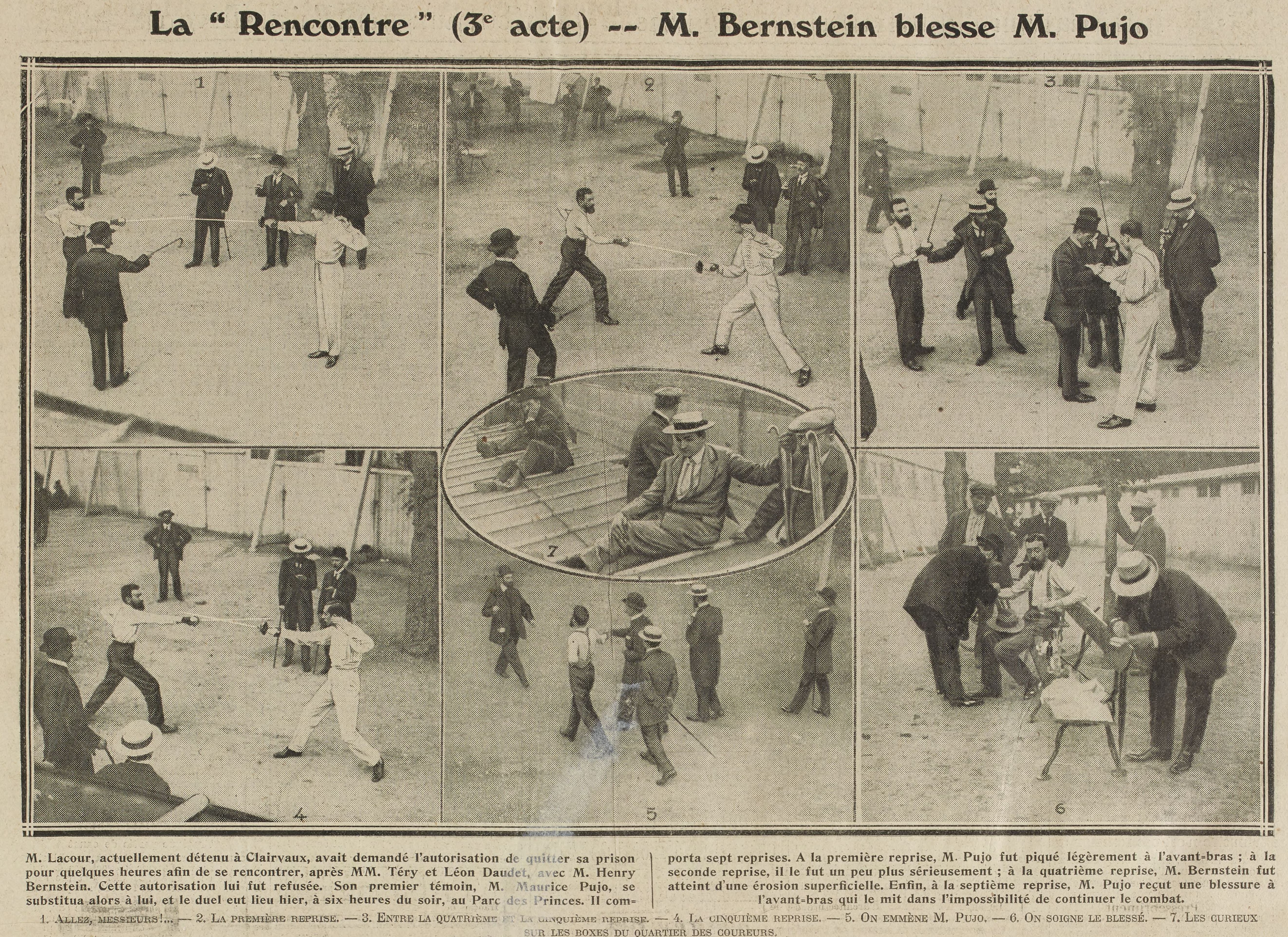
Duel between Maurice Pujo and Henry Bernstein in Excelsior on July 27, 1911

=== The Three Year Law ===
In 1913, faced with the threat of an armed conflict with the German Empire, Action Française decided to support the extension of the duration of military service under the Three Year Law. The Camelots du Roi clashed with left-wing activists who were unfavorable to this measure and more inclined to improving relations with the German Empire and to the military training of reservists. The Camelots du Roi and the leaguers take part in numerous contradictory conferences as well as demonstrations in several cities: Bordeaux, Nice, Toul, Epinal, Toulouse, Limoges, Dijon, Orléans, Lille, Lyon, Rennes.

The law was finally adopted on 7 August 1913. Charles Maurras boasted that the President of the Council Louis Barthou had complimented Action française: "It would not have been possible without the Camelots du Roi". A probably apocryphal quote.

However, the merit of the promulgation of this law does not belong solely to the Camelots du Roi. The historian Rosemonde Sanson recalls that "the press campaigns carried out by groups of moderate republicans, the creation a little later of the Federation of the Lefts on the eve of the legislative elections of 1914 had, without a doubt, a greater repercussion".

=== During the Great War ===
In 1914, the Camelots du Roi sought to maintain their meetings although attendance was down due to the war and the call-up of many militants. In September 1915, the Action française decided to suspend the activity of the Camelots du Roi. In 1916, some sections nevertheless managed to maintain a rhythm and ensure meetings, such as in Bordeaux, Toulouse, Marseille, Nogent le Perreux, Rouen, Angers, Montpellier, Chambéry, Nantes, Riom and Saint Germain en Laye. The sections of Vannes, Nîmes, Lorient, Laval, Saint Denis, Nancy, Saint Nazaire, Tours manage to bring together members and activists from time to time.

At the end of the First World War, 10 of the 12 secretaries general and assistants of the Action française students between 1909 and 1914 were killed in action.

=== The assassination of Marius Plateau ===
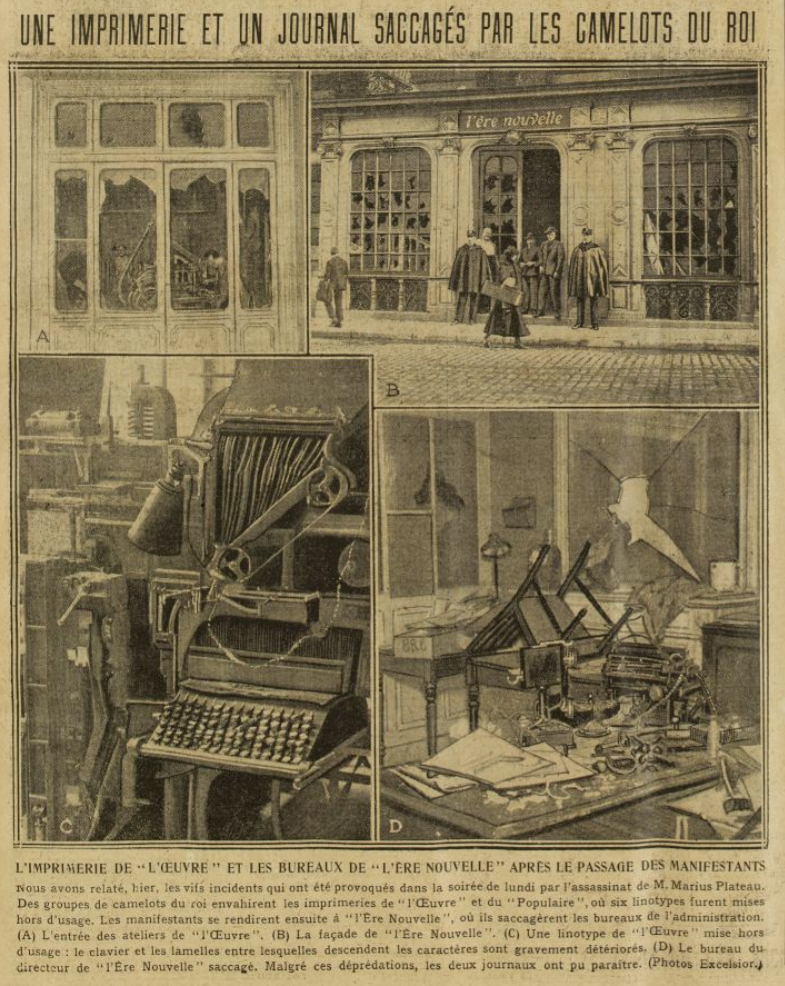
Saccages de l’Ère nouvelle et de l’Œuvre par les Camelots du Roi le 23 janvier 1923.

On 22 January 1923, the Secretary General of the Camelots du Roi, Marius Plateau, was assassinated by Germaine Berton, an anarchist militant, to avenge Jean Jaurès and Miguel Almereyda, and also to protest against the occupation of the Ruhr. Beheaded, the Camelots du Roi unleashed their fury by ransacking the offices and printing presses of three left-wing newspapers: L'Œuvre, L'Ère Nouvelle and Bonsoir. Following the attacks, the public opinion was not in favor of the violence and destruction caused by the Camelots. Le Populaire wrote: "someone (Germaine Berton) dared to turn the methods of the Camelots against them".

On the evening of 31 May 1923, the Catholic Marc Sangnier, the radical Maurice Violette, and the socialist Marius Moutet spoke at a meeting in the hall of learned societies against "French fascism". However, the Camelots du Roi attacked the three men by beating them and coating them with tar and printing ink. The victims narrowly escaped treatment with castor oil. The next day, the Communists, the Socialists, and, for the first time, the Radicals, who also expressed their deep dissatisfaction. The Radicals, through the voice of their leader Édouard Herriot, asked the government to reaffirm its republican character. Because of this aggression, the Camelots du Roi were nicknamed the "Apaches du Roy" in several press titles

On 22 January 1930, the Association Marius Plateau was created in homage to the exemplary legacy of Marius Plateau.

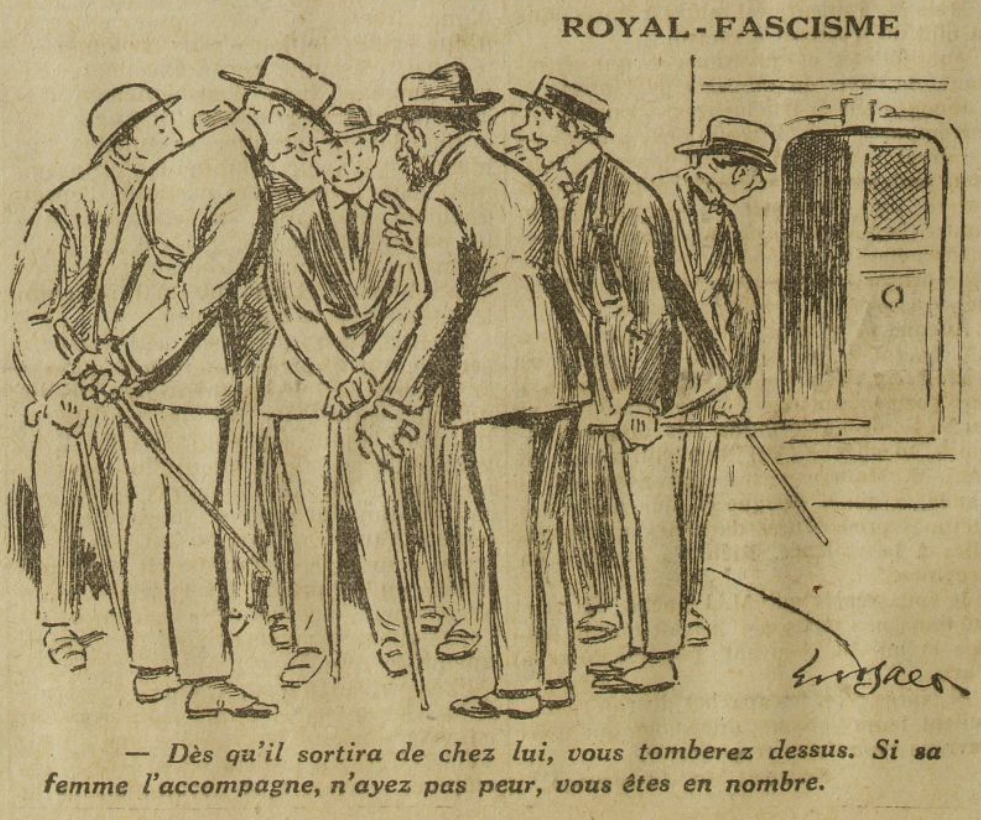
Caricature relating to the attack on Marc Sangnier, Maurice Violette and Marius Moutet in L'Œuvre of June 3, 1923.

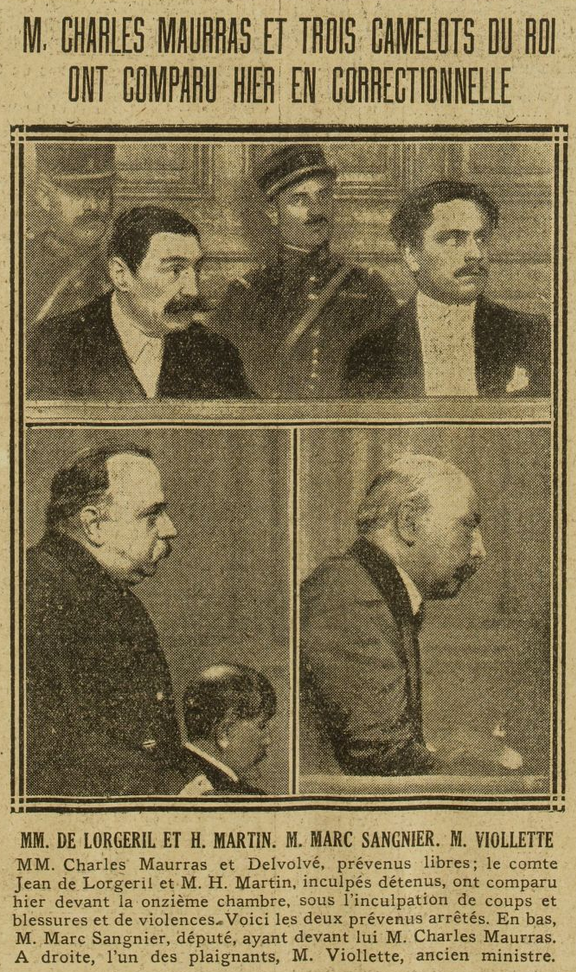
Appearance of three Camelots du Roi on June 27, 1923.

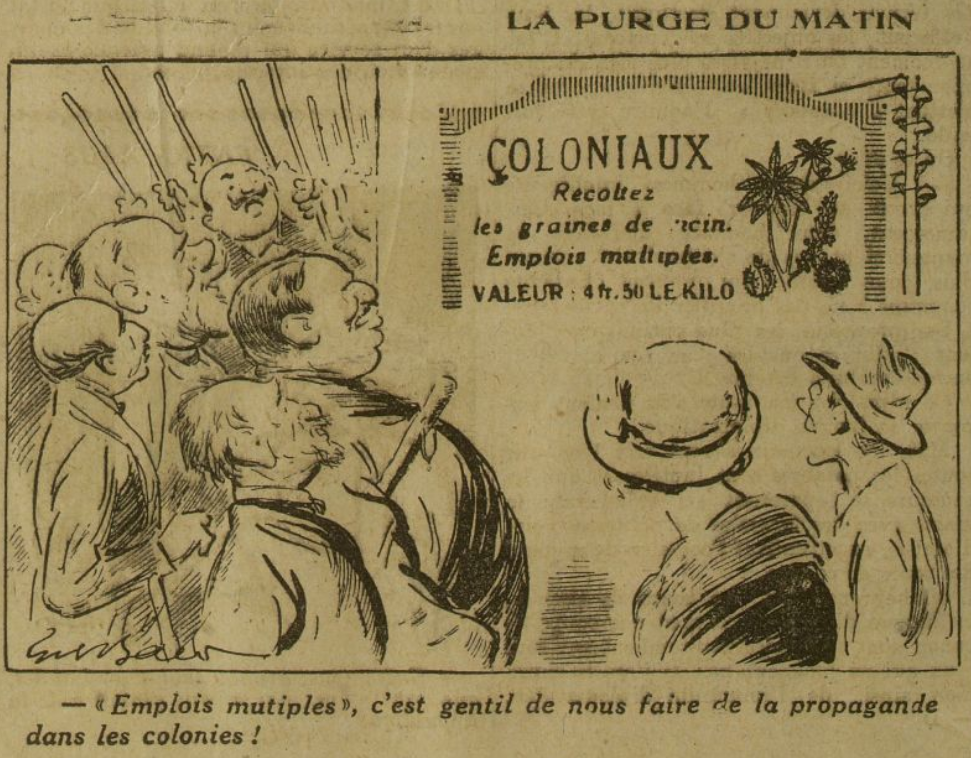
Caricature of Action française on its use of castor oil in L'Œuvre of June 17, 1923.

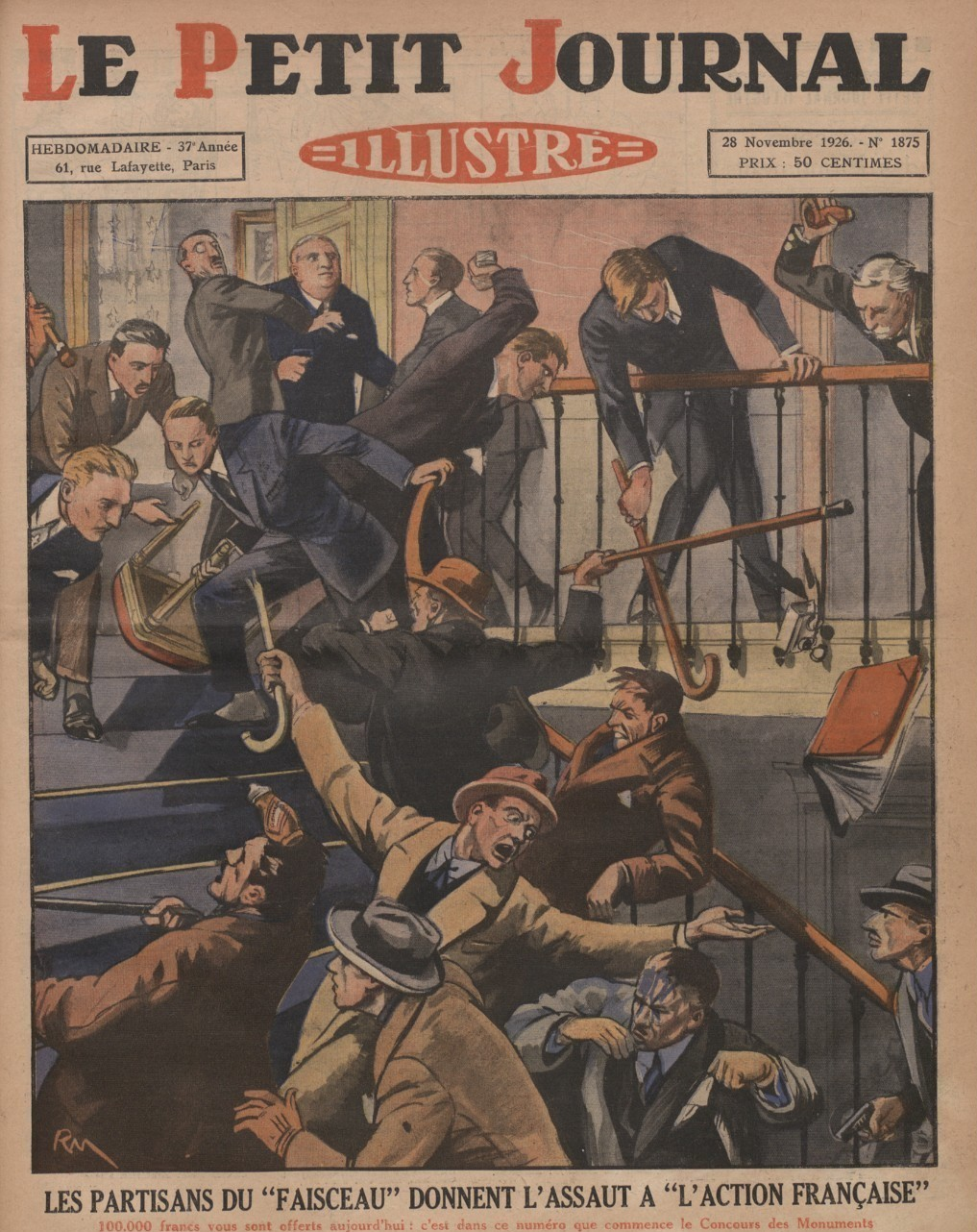
Attack on the premises of Action Française by the Faisceau in Le Petit Journal illustré of 28 November 1926

=== The dissidence of Faisceau ===
On 11 November 1925, Georges Valois, a former member of Action Française, founded the first French fascist party, baptized Faisceau. This short-lived group intentionally overshadowed Action Française. Indeed, when he left Maurras, Georges Valois allegedly took with him the subscriber list of L'Action française. When it was created, the Faisceau stole 1800 adherents from the Action française between December 1925 and April 1926 in Paris alone. As a repeat offence, the Camelots du Roi sabotaged a meeting of the University Beam at the Salle d'Horticulture in Paris on 15 December 1925 by routing Georges Valois. Consequently, René Bardy, a former communist, was instructed by Georges Valois "to set up a security service capable of facing both Maurras's troops and those of the Communist Party".

In April 1926, the Faisceau beat the Action française in the Paris region with 15 127 members against 13,500. The Camelots du Roi acted as agents provocateurs to sabotage the rise of the Faisceau.

On 14 November 1926, the situation degenerated once again. Le Faisceau organized a punitive expedition to the premises of the Action française, in the rue de Rome.

=== During the condemnation of the papacy ===
The Camelots du Roi also used stratagems. It happened that during a parade the Camelots at the head of the procession would go back to the tail of the procession to parade a second time, which they did, for example, on 28 November 1926, during the pilgrimage celebrating the dead of Action French in the Vaugirard cemetery. On 30 May 1927, during the Joan of Arc Parade, the Camelots disrupted rival Catholic groups by transmitting counter-orders through clandestine hookups to the telephone line.

=== Against interwar pacifism ===
In November 1930, the Camelots du Roi and Action Française students prevented the holding of a meeting of the Human Rights League devoted to "Germany and us".

The year 1931 marked a new impetus in the activity of the Camelots du Roi. On 27 November 1931, the Camelots disturbed the International Disarmament Congress, organized by the School of Peace of Louise Weiss, at the Trocadéro in Paris and brought together several thousand people from around forty different countries. The Camelots, allied with the Croix-de-Feu and the Jeunesses patriotes stormed the tribune and expelled the personalities who occupied it. They had to evacuate the room to successfully get the Camelots out.

Between 1932 and 1933, pacifists and royalists clashed on many occasions.

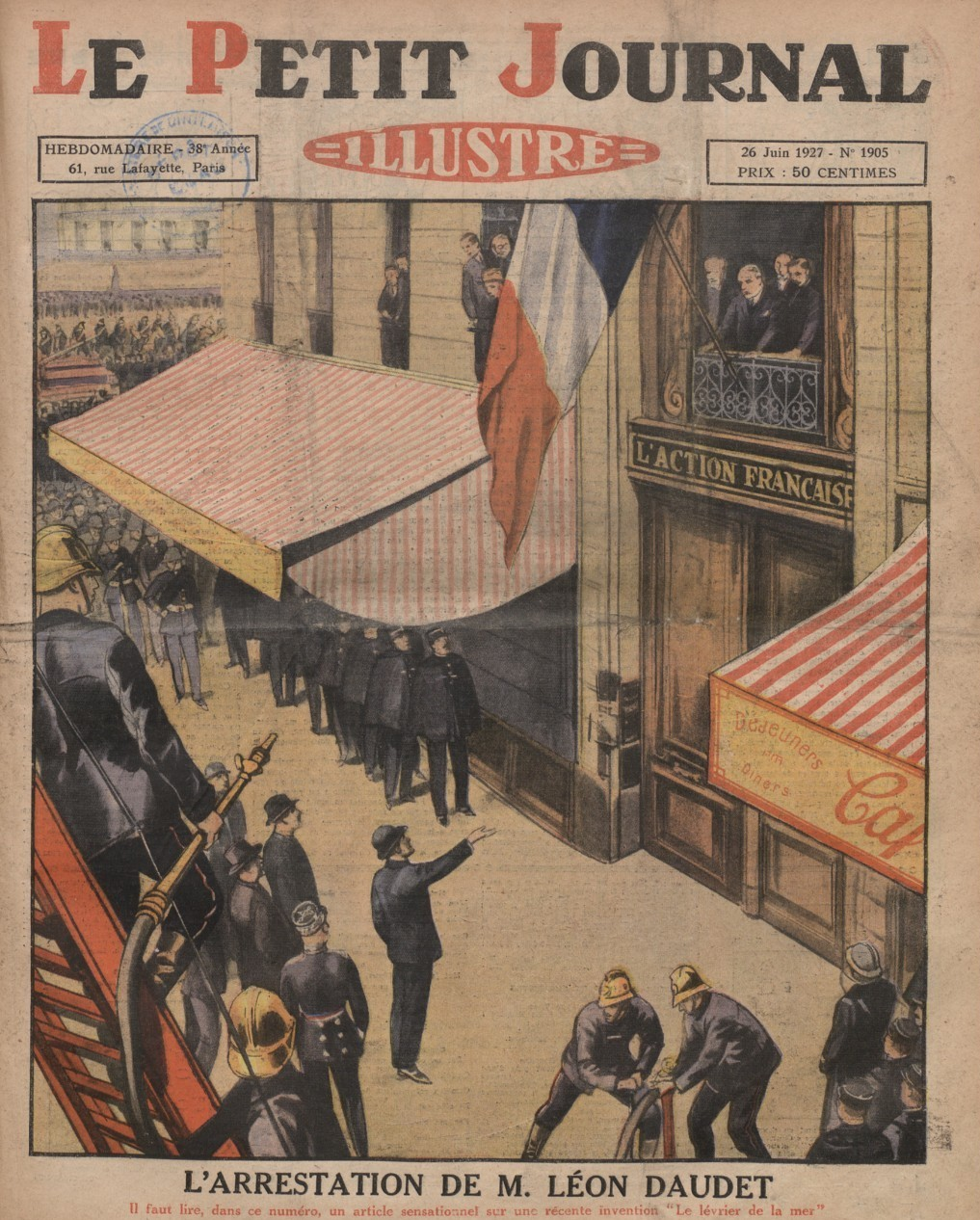
Surrender of Léon Daudet in Le Petit Journal illustré of 26 June 1927.

=== The siege of Rome street ===
In 1927, the Camelots du Roi actively participated in the protection of Léon Daudet and Joseph Delest when they were ordered to serve a prison sentence following the complaint of the taxi driver Bajot quoted in the Philippe Daudet Affair. From 9 June 1927, Léon Daudet took refuge in the premises of Action française, rue de Rome, to evade justice. The Camelots du Roi and the leaguers barricaded the place like Fort Chabrol. After three days of siege which gave rise to major fights with the police, the prefect Jean Chiappe obtained the surrender of the two main madmen, who were immediately imprisoned in the prison de la Santé. On 25 June 1927, the telephonist Charlotte Montard escaped Léon Daudet, Joseph Delest and the communist Pierre Semard thanks to a hoax telephone call to the Director of the prison. For this plan, Charlotte Montard delegates to a dozen Camelots du Roi, including André Real del Sarte and Pierre Lecœur, the responsibility of saturating the prison telephone lines.

=== The great dissidence of 1930 ===
In 1930, the Camelots du Roi and the Ligue d'Action française waged a fratricidal war within the Action Française. Pierre Lecœur, secretary general of the Camelots du Roi, was accused of being a police informant by Bernard de Vesins, Henri Martin and Paul Guérin. Pierre Lecœur managed to baffle his detractors, who resigned. Several other resignations followed in Paris and in the provinces, and settling of accounts with "cane strokes on the premises of the newspaper" were reported by Jean de Fabrègues. This crisis weakened Action française not only in terms of staff but also financially.

=== Stavisky affair ===
In 1933, the economic crisis of America affected France and was accompanied by a political crisis, the Stavisky affair, with the rise of anti-parliamentarianism in France.

On 25 December 1933, on the orders of the sub-prefect Antelme, the director of the Municipal Credit of Bayonne Gustave Tissier was arrested for fraud and putting into circulation false bearer bonds for an amount of 25 million francs. It was quickly discovered that Tissier was only the executor of the founder of the Communal Credit, Serge Alexandre Stavisky, who organized this fraud under the complicit supervision of the Deputy Mayor of Bayonne, Joseph Garat, who was sentenced to two years in prison.

The investigation, led in particular by Albert Prince, head of the financial section of the Paris prosecutor's office, uncovers the many relationships maintained by the scammer in the police, press and justice circles: the deputy Gaston Bonnaure, the senator René Renoult, the Minister for the Colonies and former Minister of Justice Albert Dalimier, the editors of newspapers Albert Dubarry and Camille Aymard.

The Action française and the Camelots du Roi then seized on the affair, denouncing "the Bayonne scandal". From a banal scam, the "Stavisky affair" became a politico-financial scandal that affected all circles of the established republic, in particular the radical party. Popular indignation leads to the fall of the radical socialist government. Édouard Daladier replaces Camille Chautemps as Chairman of the Board. He immediately dismisses the prefect of police Jean Chiappe, suspected of sympathy with the right-wing leagues. On 6 February 1934, Édouard Daladier presented the new government to the National Assembly. At the same time, a large demonstration was organized in Paris, Place de la Concorde, at the call of several right-wing leagues including the Camelots du Roi on the theme: "Down with thieves!"

The demonstration degenerated into violence. The police opened fire and killed 17 people. Three days later, a counter-demonstration in turn degenerated and killed four people. Édouard Daladier must give way to Gaston Doumergue at the head of the government.

Other incidents occurred at the Sorbonne, such as the campaign against the law professor Gérard Lyon-Caen, of the Jewish faith, whom the Camelots du Roi succeeded in putting into early retirement; or the intervention of Maurice Pujo bursting into a university classroom and dismissing the lecturer to give a lesson on French Action.

In 1934 they participated in the troubles like the other extreme right leagues, but they lacked organization. Eugen Weber speaks of a "vaillant troop but lamentable leadership". The action plans are lost a few days before the demonstrations and the event finds very little support in the provinces.

=== Xenophobic demonstrations of 1935 ===
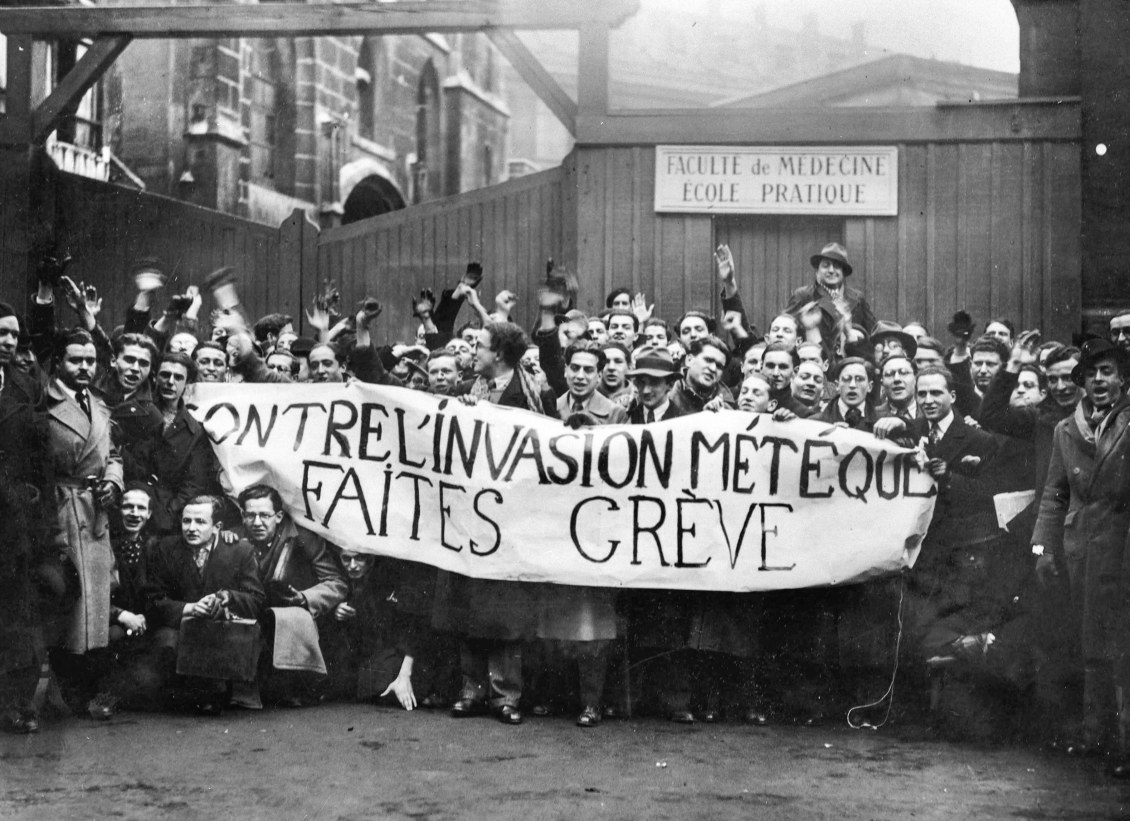
Demonstration of Parisian students in front of the Faculty of Medicine.

In the early 1930s, French doctors attributed their difficulties to a supposedly excessive number of doctors, that "would exceed the solvent demand for care". Action Française, which exerted a great attraction in the medical community thanks to the rallying of eminent members of the profession, interfered in this debate by placing the blame on foreign doctors and students.

Foreigners, especially Jews, could study medicine in France thanks to the law of 30 November 1892 which opened up the practice of medicine to any holder of a French doctorate, regardless of nationality. This displeased some medical students and doctors who referred to them as "wogs". L'Étudiant français, the student propaganda organ of Action Française, published a whole series of articles hostile to foreign students starting in 1925 and reported "xenophobic incidents reported in the faculties or services of hospitals".

In 1927, the Law of August 10, 1927 on nationality increased the number of naturalizations, which was denounced by medical unions and the Action Française.

The Armbruster law of 1933 inflamed the debate by restricting the practice of medicine to French citizens without excluding naturalized people. In 1935, tensions were exacerbated and amplified by the propaganda of the Camelots du Roi. That year, Action française had at least 1,500 doctors in its ranks according to attendance at the annual Parisian banquet of the medical profession. From January to March 1935, the Camelots du Roi took an active part in the strike movement to protest against the "invasion of the medical profession" by foreign immigrants. These demonstrations are best known for the remarkable participation of François Mitterrand under xenophobic banners.

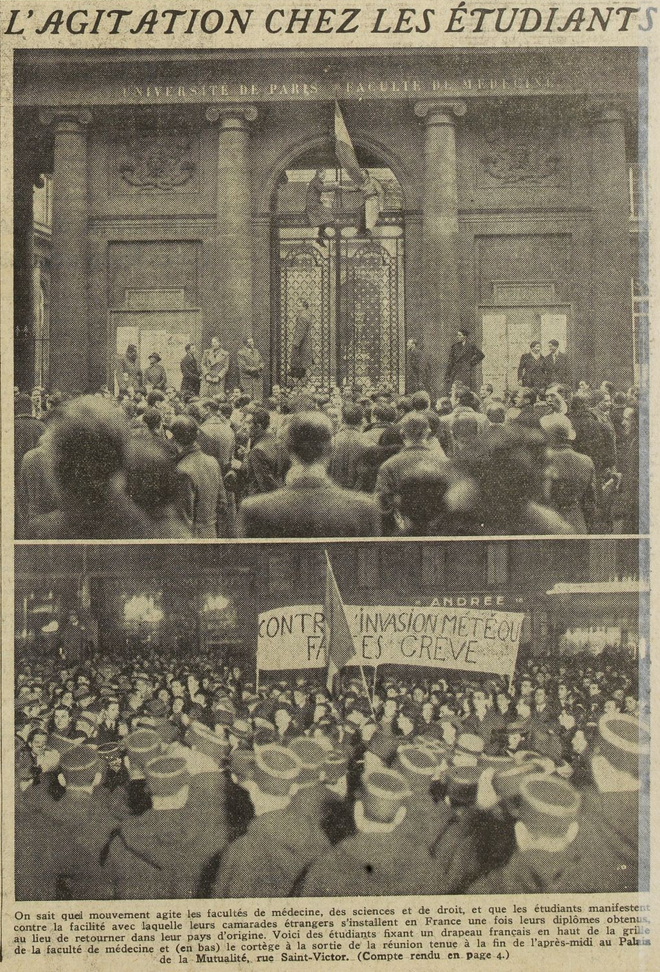
Manifestations des étudiants dans Excelsior du 3 février 1935.

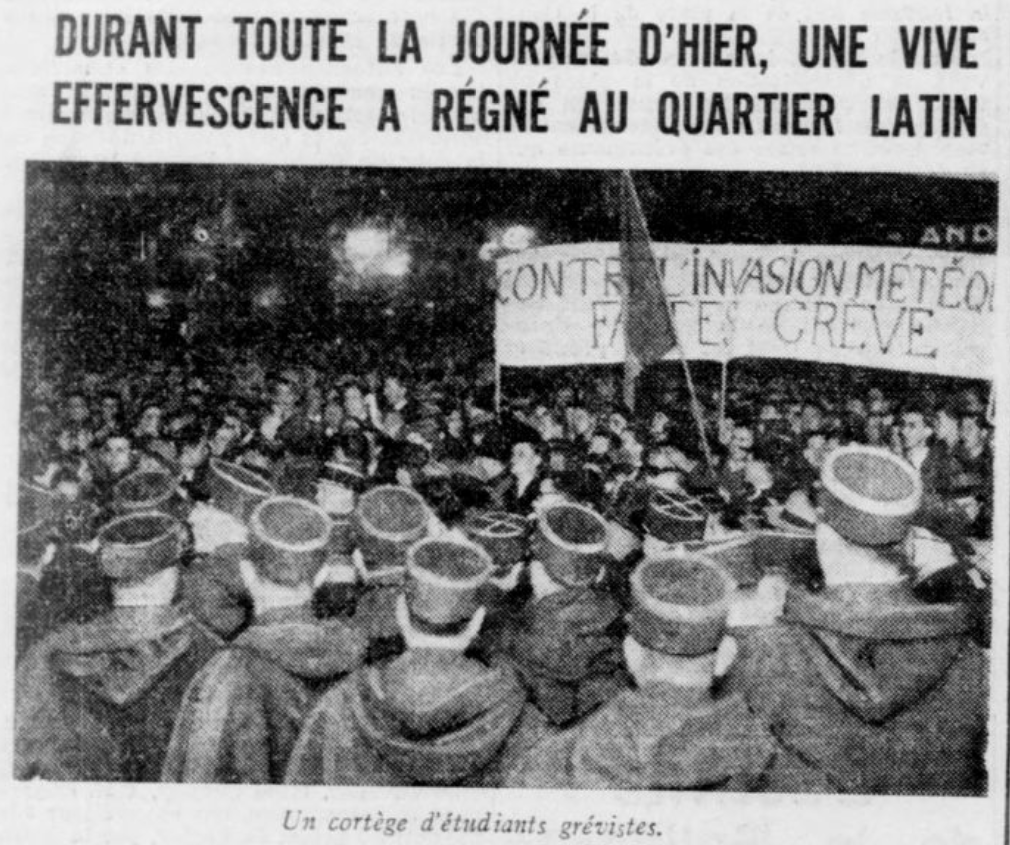
Grève des étudiants dans le quartier latin dans L'Ami du Peuple du 3 février 1935.

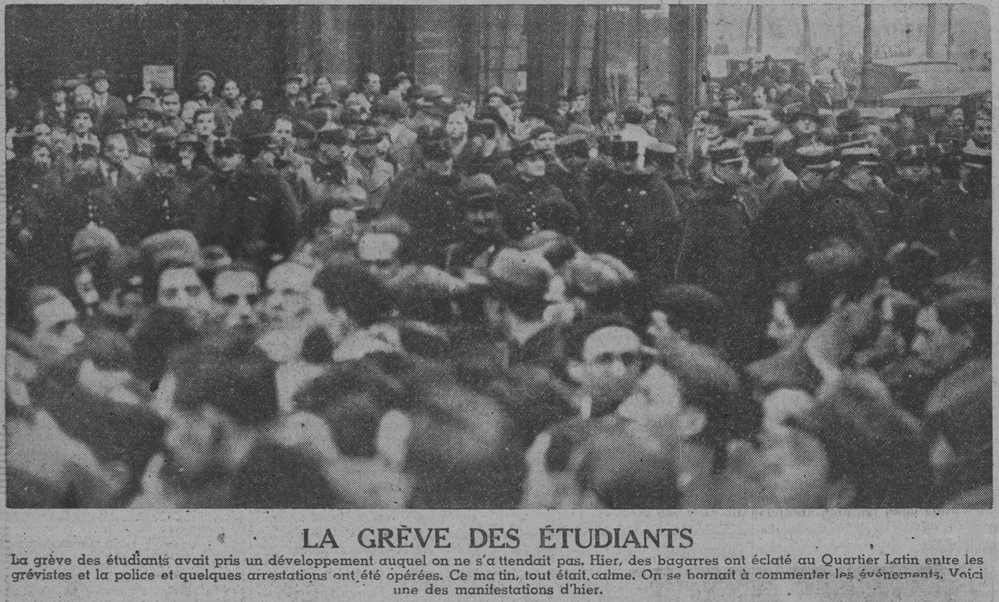
La grève des étudiants dans Paris-Soir du 3 février 1935.

=== Cagoule ===
On 9 December 1935, 97 Camelots du Roi from the 17th team of the 16th arrondissement of Paris sent a Memorandum on immobility (French: Mémoire sur l'immobilisme) to Maurice Pujo, Georges Calzant and Maxime Real del Sarte, accusing them of letting the movement collapse. The memorandum's signers included Eugène Deloncle, Jean Filiol, Aristide Corre, Jean Bouvyer, Michel Bernollin and Paul Bassompierre. On 11 January 1936, Eugène Deloncle and seven other people were officially excluded.

These activists then formed the National Revolutionary Party (French: Parti national révolutionnaire) and the Cagoule, which carried out the attack on future Prime Minister Léon Blum on 13 February 1936.

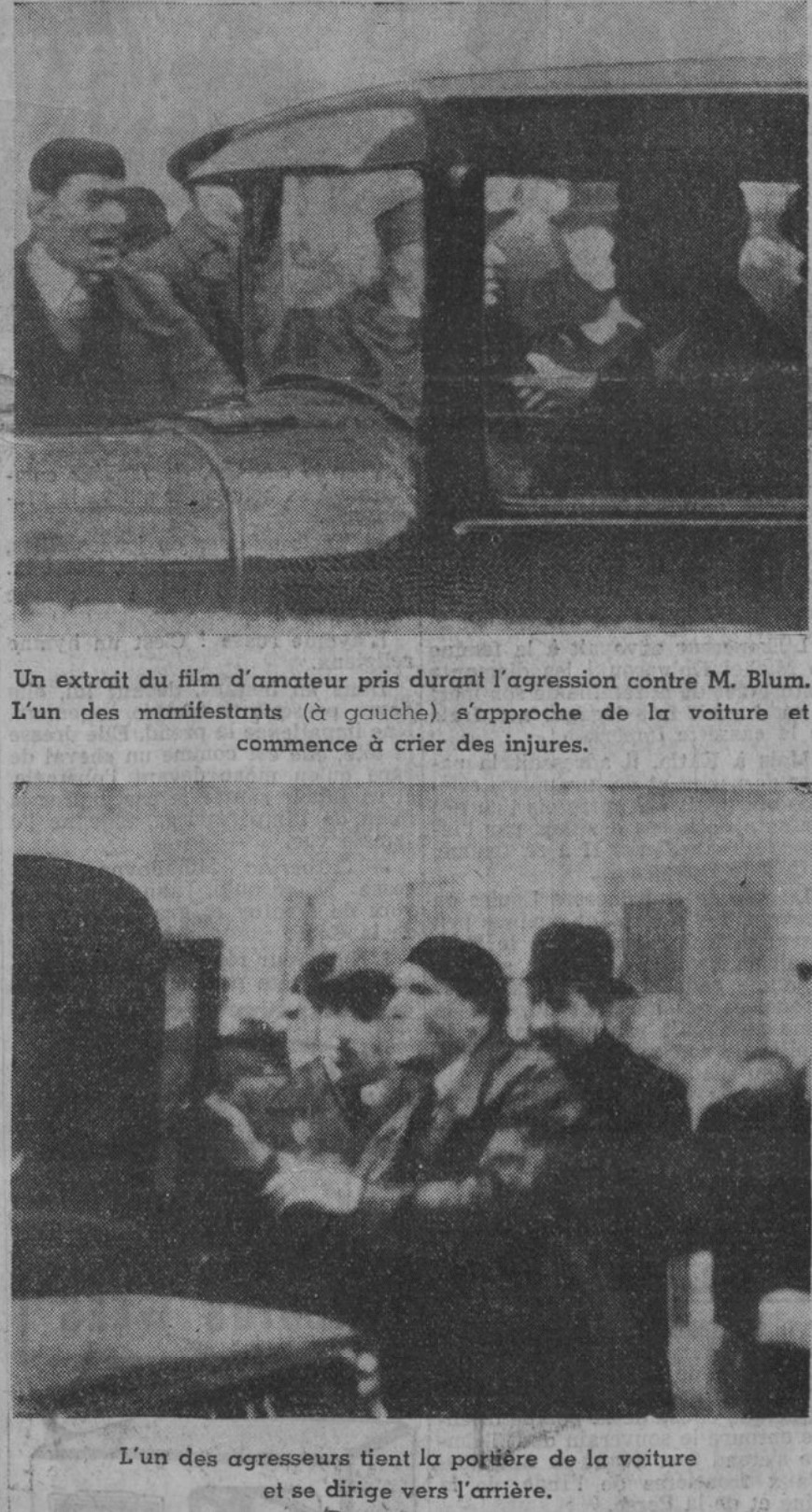
Excerpts from film footage depicting the attack on Léon Blum, published in Paris-Soir of 16 February 1936

=== Dissolution ===
On 13 February 1936, during the funeral of the royalist historian Jacques Bainville, Léon Blum drove through the procession, boulevard Saint-Germain, in Paris. Recognizing the socialist deputy, a group of Camelots du Roi led by the hooded Jean Filiol injured him. Despite the brutality of the attack, the doctors at the Hôtel-Dieu noted "a damaged ear and a ruptured arteriole". The President of the Council and Minister of the Interior Albert Sarraut decreed in the hours following the dissolution "of the de facto associations and groups, hereinafter referred to as: the French Action League, the National Federation Camelots du Roi and the National Federation of French Action Students" on the basis of the law of 10 January 1936.

Left-wing forces retaliated by organizing a large anti-fascist demonstration. On 15 February 1936, the Socialists ransacked the office of the French Action section of the 14th arrondissement and injured a leaguer in the eye.The investigation into the attack on Léon Blum shows that "most of the attackers wore Action Française armbands and insignia", and Blum's hat was found in the premises of the royalist movement Three Action Française suspects were arrested thanks to an amateur film seized by the police on which the insignia on the jackets can be seen, but not formally the one striking Léon Blum. On 24 April 1936, Louis-Gaston Courtois, former warrant officer, 38-year-old employee in an insurance company and Camelot du Roi, was sentenced to 3 months in prison and Léon Andurand was sentenced to 15 days by the correctional court of Paris. The third individual named Édouard Aragon, a 50-year-old architect, was acquitted.

Despite the official dissolution, the Camelots du Roi, somewhat disorganized by the turn of events, did not disappear and maintained their activities.

=== During WWII ===
The Camelots du Roi followed different individual trajectories. Some engaged in resistance like Daniel Cordier, Jean Ebstein-Langevin or Paul Collette while others preferred to take the path of collaboration like Jacques de Mahieu, Henri Martin, Robert Brasillach or Joseph Darnand, former Camelots du Roi, some of whom had already broken with Action Française before the war. Individual choices were also made in relation to Charles Maurras, some distanced themselves from him, others broke with him and others maintained their loyalty.

== Ideology ==
The doctrine of the Camelots du Roi was the integral nationalism developed by Charles Maurras at the beginning of the 20th century. This anti-republican and anti-democratic nationalism defended the establishment of a monarchy summed up in the "Maurrassian quadrilateral" as decentralized, hereditary, traditional and antiparliamentary. This nationalism was said to be "integral" insofar as it intended to respond to all the problems of French nationalists. For this, the Camelots du Roi gave themselves the right to use "violence in the service of reason" in accordance with the formula of Lucien Lacour Indeed, the Camelots du Roi were part of a strategy of conquest of power developed by Charles Maurras and Henri Dutrait-Crozon in Si le coup de force est possible. From their creation, the Camelots du Roi engaged in virulent nationalist and anti-republican campaigns, with the avowed intention of bringing down the regime.

The Camelots du Roi were also sensitive to State anti-Semitism and the rhetoric of Charles Maurras' "four Confederate States". This position provoked many fights between militants of the International League against Racism and Anti-Semitism and militants of Action Française during the 1930s. During the Front populaire, the anti-Semitic and anti-republican vision of the Camelots was at its peak and their actions reached a new level of violence. They led violent campaigns with renewed ardor, denouncing a republic led by "the jew Léon Blum".

== Functioning ==
=== Organization structure ===
The Camelots are divided into local sections comprising approximately 40 men. At the end of 1909, there were 65 throughout France. In 1911, the Action française claimed 95 sections and 65 subsections, then 200 sections a year later. In 1931, the National Federation of Camelots du Roi claimed 50 sections, including 22 in the Bouches-du-Rhône. In 1934, the group declared 75 sections, including 32 for Bouches-du-Rhône.

=== Recruitment ===
The Camelots du Roi come "on the one hand from the fairly discreet "volunteer sellers" of Action Française, which has become a daily newspaper, and on the other from the Students of AF". The movement brought together very different individuals: students from the upper classes (the three Real del Sarte brothers, Henry des Lyons, Armand du Tertre, de Lauriston, Théodore de Fallois, Xavier d'Ercevillen, Guy de Bouteiller, Roger de Vasselot, Jean d'Orléans, Jean de Trincaud La Tour), but also recruits from a more humble position such as Marius Plateau, stock market errand boy, Georges Bernanos, Lucien Lacour, carpenter, Louis Fageau, butcher.

After the incarceration of the 15-year-old militant Roger de Vasselot, Maurice Pujo authorized membership of the King's Camelots only from the age of 18 in 1909 and demanded an investigation into the profession and the resources rookies.

This kept away those who were tempted to register with us in the sole hope of obtaining material relief […] the lazy, the voluntary unemployed where the police so easily recruit their informants did not last long with us.

— Maurice Pujo,

In the Seine department in 1912, out of 776 Camelots du Roi there were 253 employees, 173 students, 75 shopkeepers, 64 workers, 40 unemployed, 10 professors, 9 publicists, 3 pensioners, 3 engineers, 1 lawyer.

In the 1920s, the success of royalism among students was such that the term "Camelot" came to designate any active member. The active members of the Camelots generally remained so for the time of their studies, and a certain number of them then entered the ranks of Action française.

=== Activities ===
In 1912, the Camelots du Roi were subjected to a discipline "more severe than the simple leaguers of AF". Activists are forced to sell the newspaper at least twice a month, the absence of response to two summons is worth exclusion and political meetings are held weekly. Activists were responsible for monitoring the actions of the Camelots du Roi as a kind of internal police and for reporting to the steering committee the threats against certain militants. Their obligations are heavy: they must be ready for all parades or demonstrations, and of course sell L'Action française every Sunday. Sales of the newspaper often give rise to brawls with right-wing and left-wing opponents, the outcome of which can sometimes be tragic, such as Marcel Langlois, killed on 3 February 1935 during a confrontation with communists.

The Camelots du Roi also lend a hand to other organizations. On Easter Sunday 1925, they ensured the order of a Catholic meeting; in March 1926, they defended a meeting of the Catholic Federation in Marseille; provide security for René Benjamin, attacked during his conferences by teachers' unions he had ridiculed.

The organization strongly values youth. L'Action française and the Critical review of ideas and books constantly refer to the vigor, beauty and purity of youth, essential to the monarchist struggle. Thus Georges Bernanos declares "French youth loves greatness". Some intellectuals emphasize this aspect, such as the historian Daniel Halévy, despite being a Dreyfusard and close to Charles Péguy, who describes 24 May gathering of young people who were members of the Camelots du Roi and the Action française like a "spectacle so rare in our Parisian streets, this virile elegance, this beauty, this nobility…".

== The methods of action ==
=== Violence and provocations ===
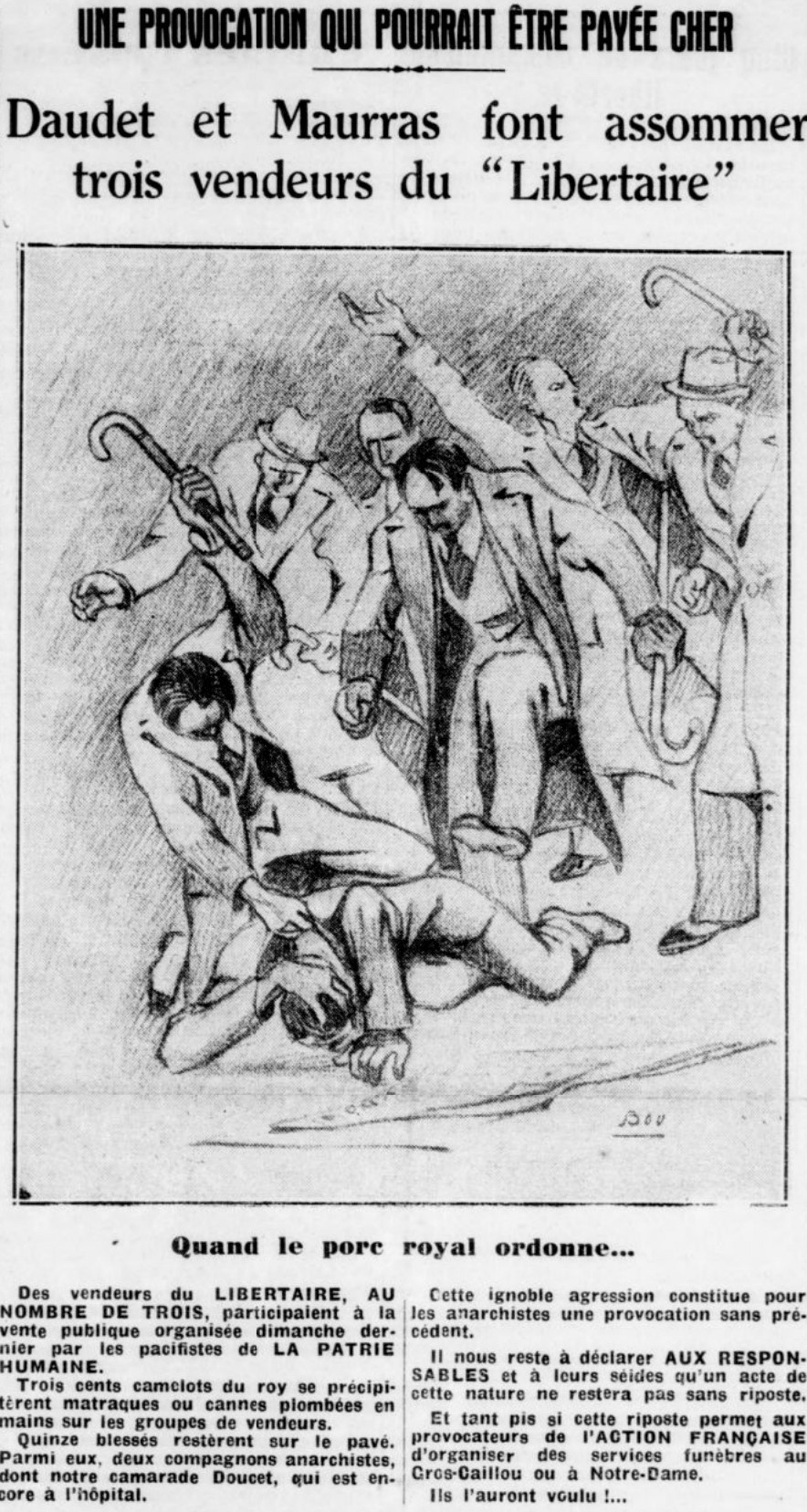
Aggression of anarchists by the Camelots du Roi in Le Libertaire of 12 February 1932.

Henri Lagrange sums up the spirit of the Camelots du Roi: "A cane in your hand and a book in your pocket". Mostly students, the King's Camelots show a pronounced taste for provocative farce, royalist folklore (they include the repertoire of Chouan songs) and confrontations with left-wing students and their political opponents. Capable of mobilizing quickly and massively, Camelots often appear to outnumber them. Although their brutality earns them criticism, it inspires respect in their opponents. Their determination and taste for action give their action a revolutionary character.

In 1912, Marius Plateau created the commissioners of Action française in charge of policing meetings. This organization, directly affiliated with the Camelots du Roi groups, made it possible to form "combat groups" of 16 to 20 people. These marshals had to have two types of canes: an ordinary one and a second weighted one or a truncheon. Sometimes, political meetings give rise to real melee between Camelots du Roi and political adversaries. On 11 April 1934, a communist counter-demonstrator named Joseph Fontaine was killed by the Camelots du Roi during a private meeting organized in Hénin-Liétard. The Camelots du Roi are recognized in a state of self-defense.

Their violence against their opponents is also verbal through their songs, notably the hymn of the Camelots du Roi .

Some prominent figures report extremely virulent remarks such as those of Bernanos who wrote to Professor Alain, in response to one of his articles in a Rouen republican newspaper : "It's not your idea that I despise, it's you".

=== A threat to order and to the right side ===
Acting as both the Action Française security service, shock troops and activists of the movement, they fairly quickly caught the concerned attention of those in power, and above all of Aristide Briand who saw in them and in their violence poses serious dangers to the order and maintenance of the Republic.

Every day we saw the streets, the courtrooms invaded by gangs eager for violence and disorder; one saw statues of honest republicans worthy of veneration, stained, insulted; one felt that the electoral battle was going to take place in this atmosphere of hostility; the workers moved away from the Republican Party...

— Aristide Briand,

But if they antagonized the republicans, the Camelots du Roi embarrassed the right side almost as well. Their audacity, the violence of their polemics and their taste for street battles scandalized the royalists who had remained faithful to the conservative and legalistic spirit of Orleanism.

This tendency was massively represented in the political office of Duke Philippe d'Orléans, and was found in the pages of Gaulois, whose director, Arthur Meyer was close to the duke. This traditional royalism seemed to have won when, on 20 March 1910, Le Gaulois published an interview with the Duke of Orléans, who denounced the violence of the King's Camelots, and who brandished the threat of a formal disavowal if their militants "continued not to distinguish between friends and enemies, and if a persistent error of maneuver pushed them to direct their fire on the bulk of the royalist troops". Lucien Lacour's slap in the face of Aristide Briand at the end of 1910 also accentuated the tensions between Action Française and the Duke of Orléans. Eventually, the Duc d'Orléans' political office came under the control of Action Française, and remained in its hands for a quarter of a century.

== See also ==
- Action Française
- 6 February 1934 riots
- Bloody Sunday (1926)
- Absolute monarchy
