= Philippe Daudet affair =

1923 French legal controversy

Philippe Daudet Affair
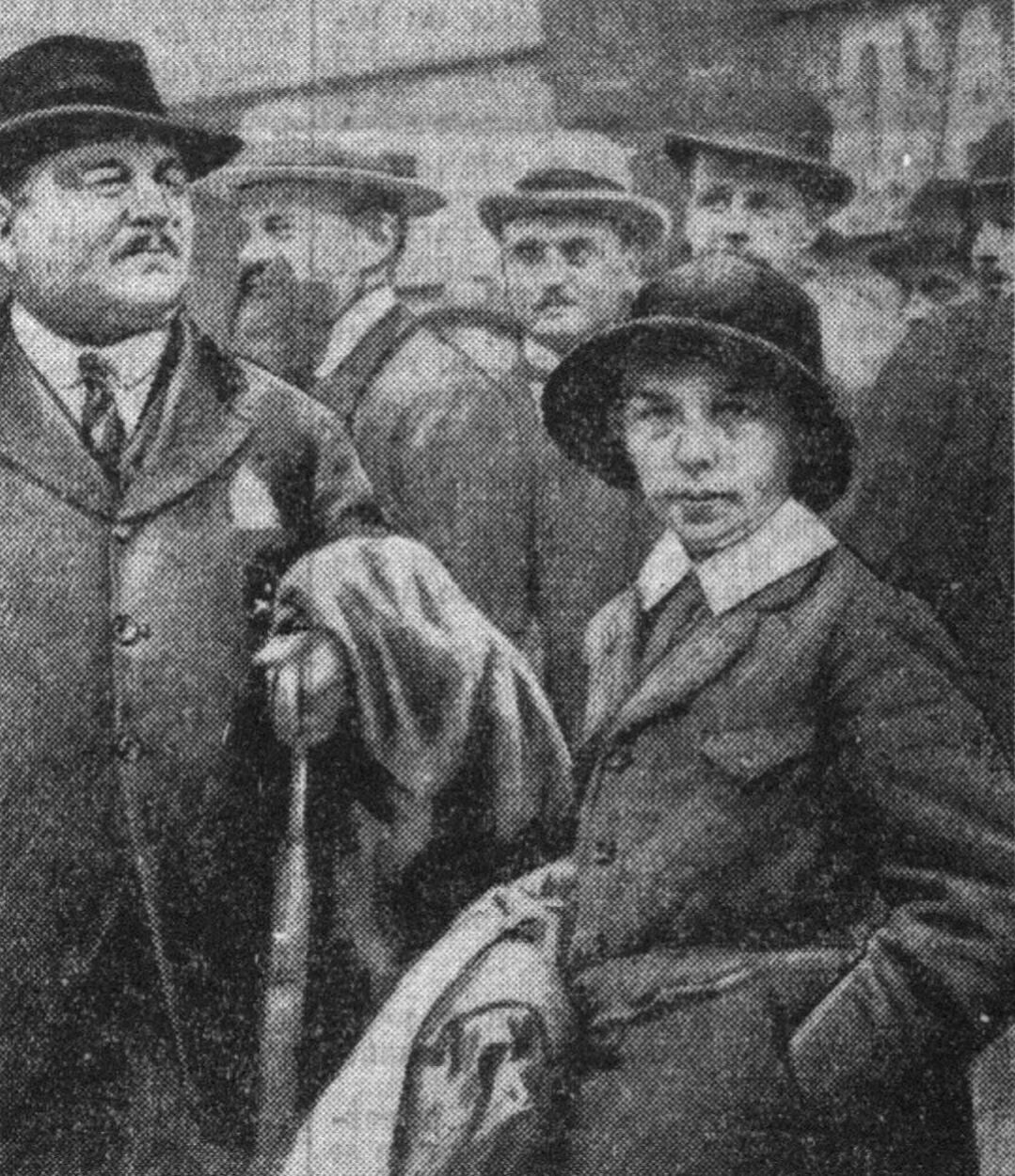
- Léon Daudet (left) with Philippe (right)

The Philippe Daudet affair, named after Philippe Daudet (1909–1923), was a French legal filing and subsequent controversy following the suicide of Philippe Daudet at age 14. (Note: Eugen Weber writes at first that some points of the case remain unclear (Weber 1985, p. 196), Weber does retain the fact that Philippe Daudet did commit suicide: "the despair that had already suggested suicide to him before, now seemed more decisive, and Philippe raised his pistol." (Weber 1985, p. 199).) The initial investigation into Philippe's death concluded he had committed suicide via gunshot, following plans to carry out anarchist attacks against the French government and other high-profile individuals. Philippe was the son of Action Française founder Léon Daudet, who successfully petitioned to the court to investigate Philippe's death, while rejecting the results of the initial investigation. Léon instead claimed there was a grander conspiracy against himself and his family. Léon mobilized Action Française and the Daudet family, both claiming that anarchist groups, French police, and the French government had conspired in his son's death. The case and its appeals were concluded in 1925, with the official ruling being that there was no evidence of murder or conspiracy.

The case received significant media coverage, with French newspapers promoting Léon Daudet's claims of political assassination. This event occurred during the same time as the Germaine Berton trial, where Berton, a French anarchist, had admitted to but was subsequently acquitted of the assassination Action Française member Marius Plateau. Léon Daudet was later jailed after he called for violence against multiple French politicians for their perceived mishandling of both cases.

== Background ==
Philippe Daudet was the son of Léon Daudet and his second wife, Marthe Allard. Born in 1909, his father Léon Daudet was a journalist, political figure, and member of the royalist movement Action française. Philippe had a history of running away from home. On November 20, 1923, a 14-year-old Philippe fled from his parental home in Paris, taking a train to Le Havre and stealing money from his parents to pay for a boat trip to Canada. When the sum of money was insufficient for the boat ride, Philippe returned to Paris under false name, meeting and receiving shelter from Georges Vidal, administrator of the anarchist newspaper Le Libertaire. Here Phillippe would confide his sympathy for anarchism and informed Vidal he intended to commit attacks against Raymond Poincaré (then President of France), Alexandre Millerand (then Prime Minister of France), or even against his father. Vidal attempted to dissuade him from carrying out attacks, later kicking Philippe out of his lodging, and writing Philippe off as a "madman or agent provocateur". Another anarchist activist took Phillippe in during this time, stating that Daudet told stories, "typical of the exaggeration of adolescence", in particular "that his father beat him, punished him too severely, hated him, that he [Philippe] hated him and all the bourgeoisie he had fled, now that he wanted to take revenge on everyone by committing a dazzling crime", but Philippe did not receive any further aid in his planned attacks. While running away, Philippe met the explorer Louis-Frédéric Rouquette, and allegedly purchased a revolver. He then wrote three letters to his parents, one to his mother, writing "For a long time I was an anarchist, without daring to say so" and two additional letters announcing his suicide. None of the three letters were sent, having been discovered after his death.

On November 24, Philippe met and stated his desire to carry out a political assassination to Le Flaouter, an anarchist bookseller, supporter Germaine Berton, and police informant (which was later revealed by the anarchist André Colomer). (Note: His shop was located at 46 Beaumarchais Boulevard at the corner of Rue du Chemin-Vert.) Philippe asked Le Flaouter for ammunition but Le Flaouter attempted to dissuade Philippe. Le Flaouter told Philippe to return to his bookstore later that day, offering a book by Baudelaire to Philippe, before informing Comptroller General Lannes of the Sûreté Générale (Committee of General Security) who dispatched eight inspectors and four policemen to the store. That afternoon, around 4 pm, a taxi carrying Philippe stopped at 126 Boulevard de Magenta. Daudet had initially entered the taxi, where the driver had witness him collapse in the back seat, only later to discover that Daudet had been shot in the head. Philippe Daudet died 2 hours later at the Lariboisière Hospital, anonymously. In total, Philippe was on the run for 5 days. On November 25, the newspaper Le Petit Parisien ran a paragraph on Philippe's suicide, which was noticed by his mother, Mrs. Léon Daudet. The Daudet family sent their friend Doctor Bernard to the hospital to identify the body, ruling that "Suicide then seems to be in no doubt." Léon Daudet requested the Public Prosecutor's Office to bury Philippe without an autopsy. The religious funeral occurred at Saint-Thomas-d'Aquin before Philippe was buried at Père-Lachaise in the family vault. Doctor Bernard certified the death as a suicide, citing Philippe's "disturbed mind" but Léon Daudet would initially claim Philippe's death was the result of fast-acting meningitis. (Note: Attorney General Scherdlin said in his 1925 indictment: “It is especially appropriate to remember that, until the publication of the special issue of Le Libertaire, M. Léon Daudet had accepted the idea that his son had committed suicide.")

== The affair ==
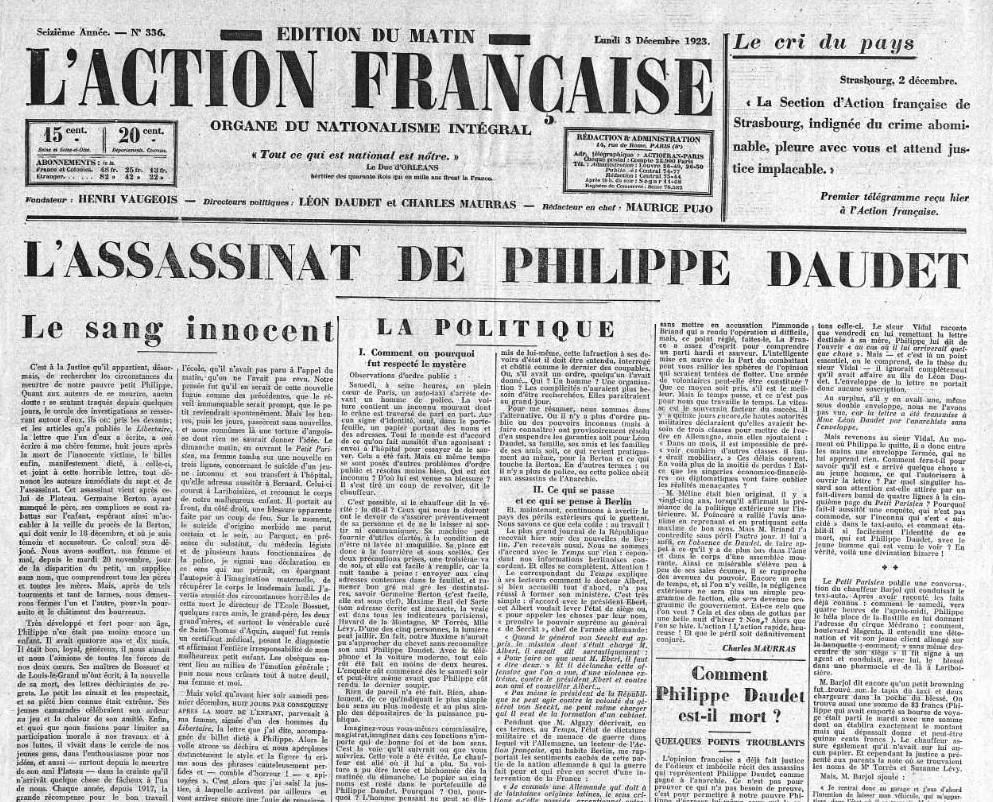
L'Action française's "The Assassination of Philippe Daudet", December 3rd, 1923

The Philippe Daudet Affair began on December 2, 1923, when a special issue (Note: Issue Number 253. The newspaper, eventually become daily, but in 1923 was still weekly.) of Le Libertaire had announced: “The tragic death of Philippe Daudet, anarchist! Léon Daudet stifles the truth”. Georges Vidal gave an account of the circumstances of Philippe's disappearance, describing him as a "hero of anarchy"; criticizing Léon Daudet of having stiffeld the voice of his son. Vidal ended by stating that Léon Daudet was responsible for the death of his son. The last page reproduced a series of poems by Philippe. On December 4, Le Libertaire would claim that Philippe returned to Paris to kill his father but instead killed himself in a fit of depression. Also on December 4, Vidal wrote in a separate article that Germaine Berton, a French anarchist currently standing trial for the assassination Action française member and friend of Léon Daudet, Marius Plateau. Videl described Berton's feelings towards Philippe as "her admiration, I will say more her love" and calling Berton "[Philippe's] his mistress". Videl would go on to claim Berton;'s deteriorating mental health was due to this love. Le Libertaire would publish a letter signed by eleven surrealists, including Louis Aragon stating "We are wholeheartedly with Germaine Berton and Philippe Daudet; we value every true act of revolt."

On December 3, one day after Le Libertaire's special addition, L'Action française released "The assassination of Philippe Daudet", a six column editorial written by Léon Daudet. claiming that Philippe was killed as a result of (premeditated) murder. It stated, "The conviction of all our friends and mine, is that after having been lured – through his escape – into an ambush, chambered, suggested or coerced, and stripped of all his papers, Philippe was thrown to his death." Léon would then claim that his son was killed as an act of "political revenge" and stated that it was "odious and imbecilic" to believe Philippe was an anarchist. He concluded stated his was to carry out his own investigation into Philippe's death and was ready to begin filing voluntary manslaughter and misappropriation of a minor changes.

For over a year, the examining magistrate and L'Action française both conducted in inquiry into the Philippe's death. In 1925, Daudet learned the magistrate intended to dismiss the case, prompting him to file a new complaint on January 26. While the first inquiry did not name a specific suspect, the second filing claimed that Police Commissioner Colombo had carried out the execution, and three senior officials of the Sûreté Générale (including Controller General Lannes) and Le Flaouter conspired in the murder. The first case was dismissed and the second case was taken up by the court of appeal. On July 30, 1925, the court, after examining Léon Daudet's arguments (six in total: (Note: Léon Daudet's arguments are listed in this order by attorney-general Scherdlin in his indictment.) implausibility of suicide, contradictions of the cab driver, absence of bullet in the barrel of the gun, suspicious discovery of the cartridge case in the cab ten days after the tragedy, absence of trace of bullet in the cab, implausibilities contained in the account of the surveillance of November 24 in front of the bookstore Le Flaouter where ten experienced policemen let Philippe Daudet out of the bookstore) retained the thesis of suicide and issued an order of dismissal. The Public Prosecutor concluded that anarchists knew Philippe's identity and had decided to exploit his presence among them "by having him arrested as an anarchist in order to cause a resounding scandal. Philippe Daudet, having finally vented the machination, would have killed himself of despair" concluding the suicide appeared to him as the only possible solution.

== Aftermath ==
=== Media coverage ===
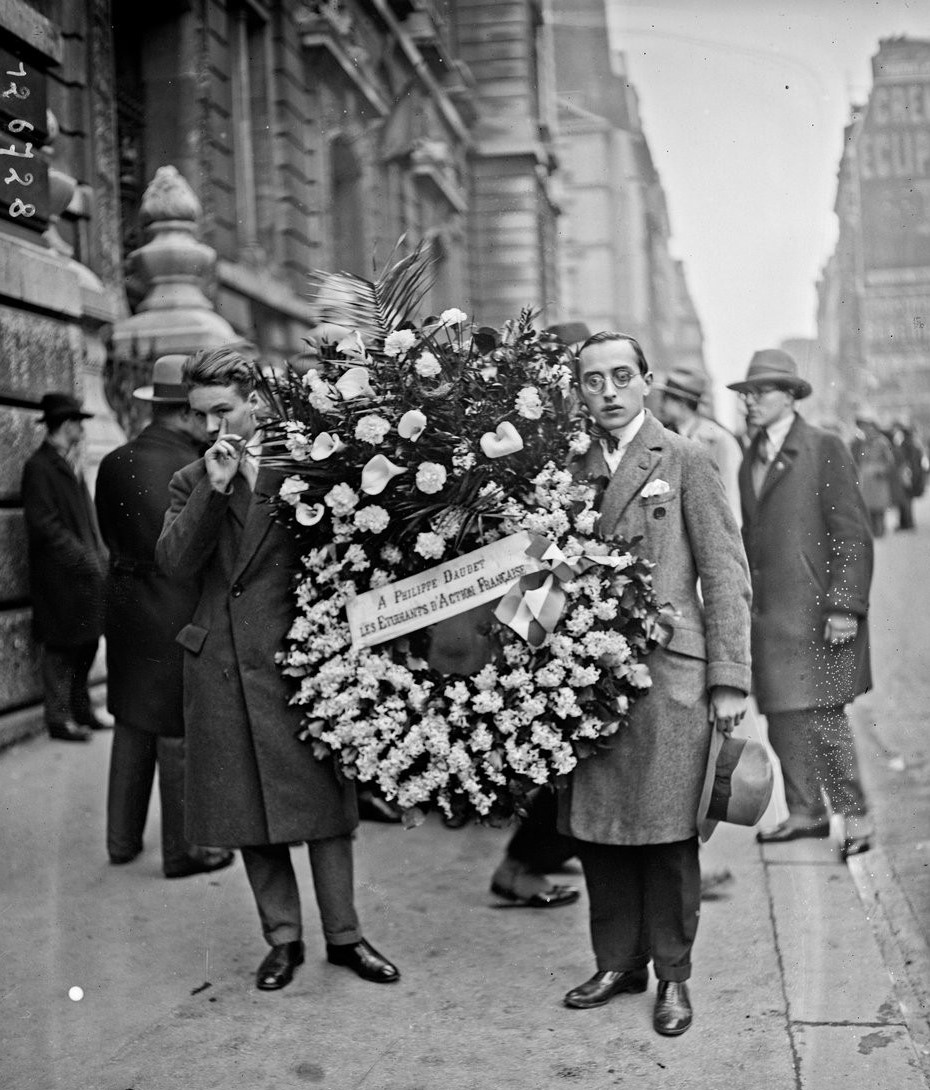
Demonstration of by members of d'Action française in homage to Philippe Daudet on February 16, 1928

Following the inquires, public opinion was divided and the newspaper L'Humanité describes this affair as a "historical enigma". The theory of assassination was propagated further by Édouard Herriot, André Lefèvre, Georges Vidal, and André Colomer, the latter of which left Le Libertaire and founded L'Insurgé as a result of the affair. On November 14, 1925, Colomer would publicly come out in support of Léon Daudet in his accusation of the State's hand in Philippe's death. Edmond Du Mesnil, director of Le Rappel, and Pierre Bertrand, editor-in-chief of Le Quotidien, accuse Le Flaouter, "by his machinations before, and by his silence after", Le Flaouter was the "accountant of the blood shed by Philippe Daudet".

=== Léon Daudet ===
Léon Daudet continued to claim his son was mortally wounded, placed in the taxi, and murdered. Daudet's distrust in the justice system deepened following the acquittal of Germaine Berton who had previously admitted conspiring to kill Léon Daudet and had successfully assassinated Marius Plateau. Following the Court of Cassation dismissing his appeal, Daudet wrote numerous articles in L'Action française where he denounced and called for violence against the Sûreté générale, the taxi driver Bajot, Le Flaouter, and even the French government. These articles eventually landed him in legal trouble. Léon Daudet was sued for defamation by the cab driver, Bajot, (Note: Eugen Weber notes that the testimony of the taxi driver contains "some inconsistencies" but was not considered a credible argument in favor of Daudet's claim of assassination.) whom Daudet had accused of being a police officer. Daudet was sentenced to a 1,500 franc fine and five months in prison, and was incarcerated at La Santé Prison on June 13, 1927. Le Figaro, Le Soir, and Le Temps all called for clemency to be granted to Daudet. This was followed by a petition for his clemency, notably signed by Anna de Noailles, Paul Valéry, Henri Bernstein, and Paul Bourget. Charlotte Montard then assisted in Daudet escaping from prison, where Léon Daudet then fled to Belgium. The French Press proceeded to criticize the Ministry of the Interior and the Sûreté générale for their handling of the situation. Daudet was pardoned by Daladier on December 30, 1929, and returned to France.

=== Homage ===
On February 16, 1929, members of Action française led a demonstration in honor of Philippe Daudet.

== Gallery ==
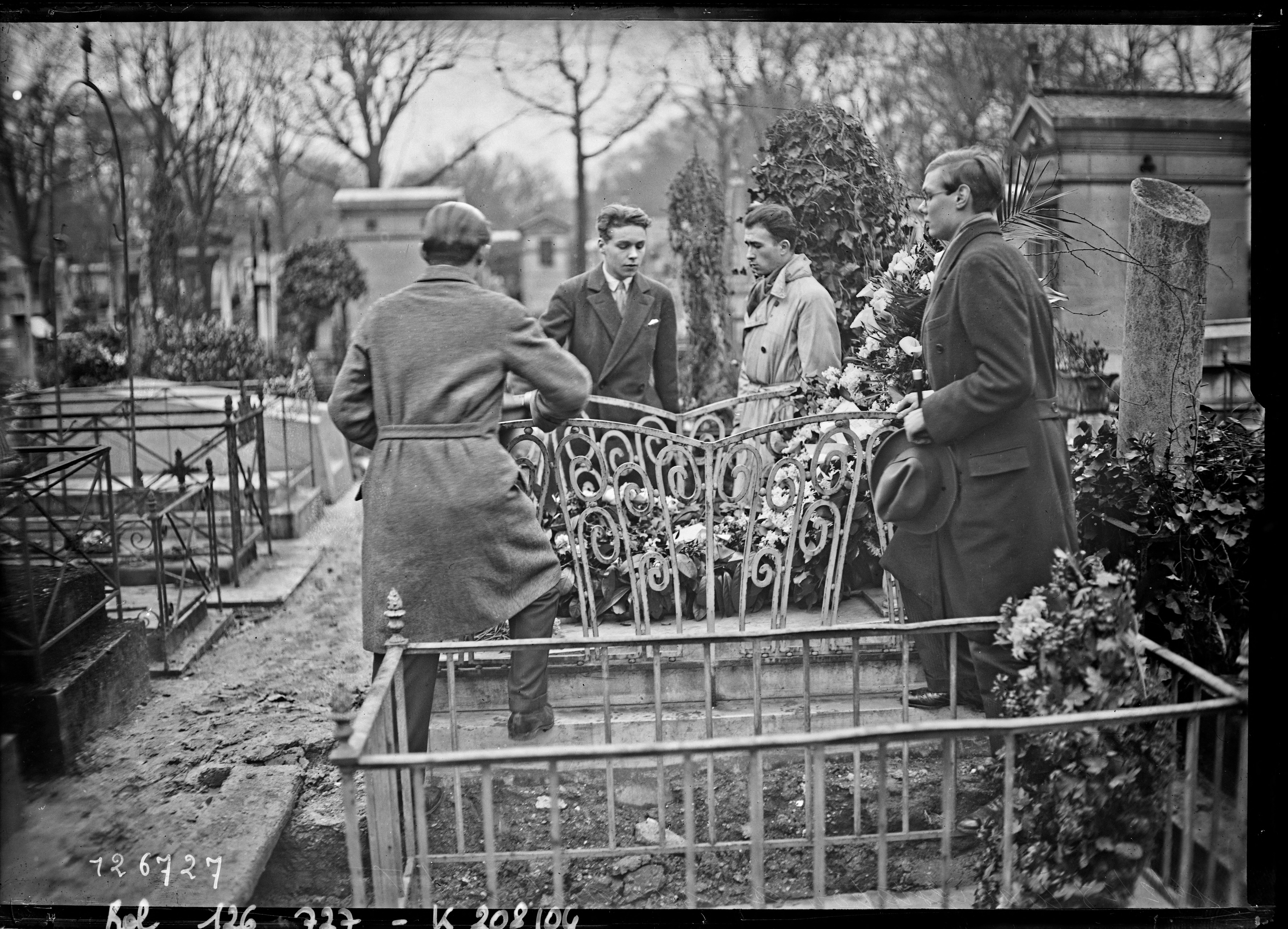
Members of Action française at Philippe's tomb, 1928

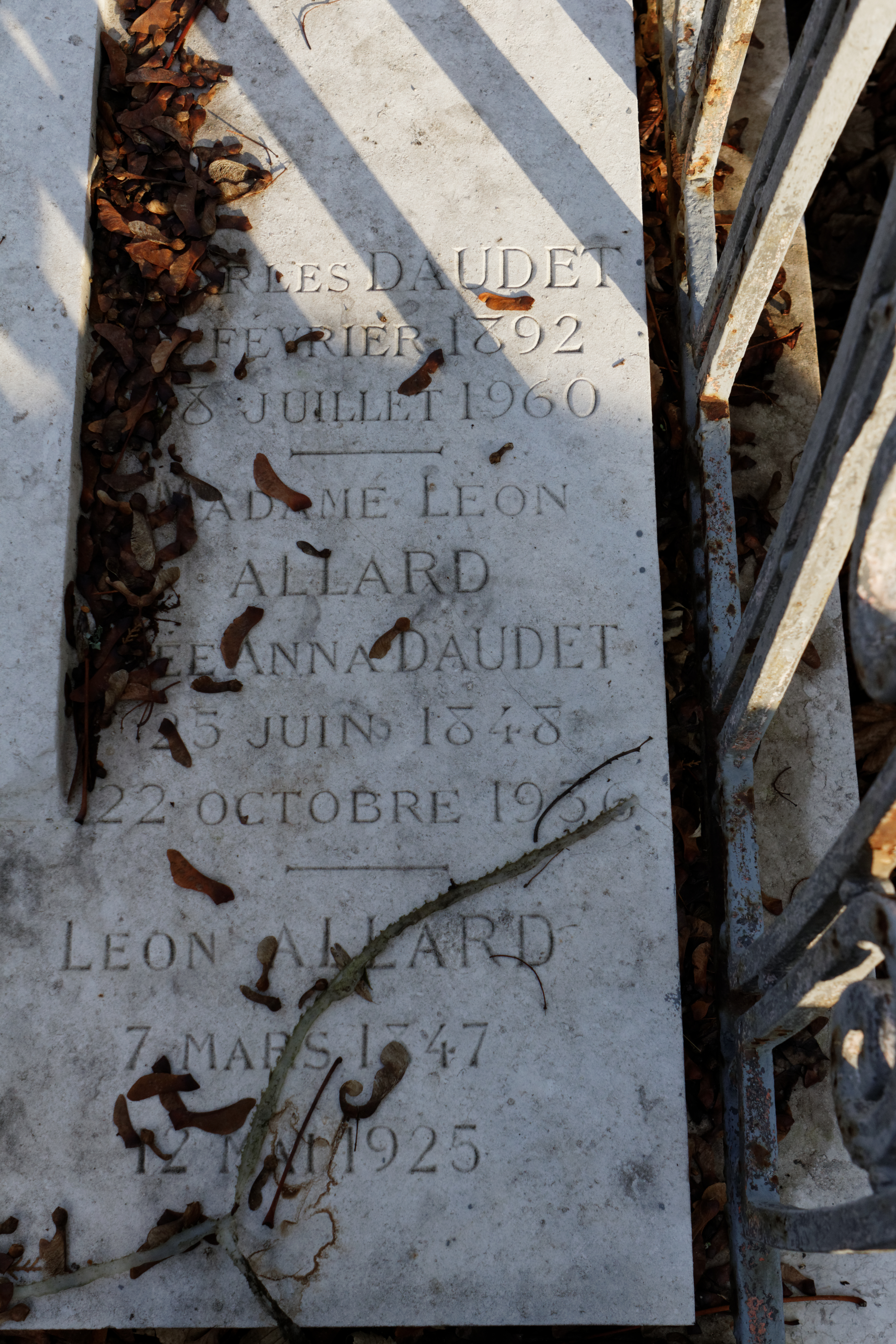
Inscription on Philippe Daudet's tomb

== Bibliography ==
- Eugen Weber, L'Action française, Fayard, 1985
- Laurent Bourdelas, Le Paris de Nestor Burma – L'Occupation et les Trente Glorieuses de Léo Malet, L'Harmattan, 2007, revient sur la vision de Malet sur cette affaire.
- Henry Bordeaux, Procès politiques : Germaine Berton, Philippe Daudet, dans Écrits de Paris, no 199, 1961, p. 56–64.
- René Breval, Philippe Daudet a bel et bien été assassiné, Paris, Éditions du Scorpion, 1959.
- Marthe Daudet, La Vie et la Mort de Philippe, Paris, Arthème Fayard et Cie, 1926.
- Marcel Guitton et André Seguin, Du scandale au meurtre. La mort de Philippe Daudet, Paris, Les Cahiers de la Quinzaine, 1925.
- Georges Larpent, The Philippe Daudet affair according to the Scherdlin indictment. The Attorney General to the aid of the assassins, Librairie de L'Action française, 1925
- Louis Noguères, Le suicide de Philippe Daudet, plaidoirie prononcée les 12 et 13 novembre 1925 devant la cour d'assises de la Seine, Paris, Librairie du travail, 1926.
- Gabriel Oberson, Une cause célèbre : la mort de Philippe Daudet. État de la question à l'issue du procès Bajot, Fribourg, Imprimerie de L. Delaspre, 1926.
- Maurice Privat, L'énigme Philippe Daudet, Paris-Neuilly, « Les Documents secrets », 1931.
- Georges-Michel Thomas, Le Flaouter et l'affaire Daudet, dans Cahiers de l'Iroise, nouvelle série, 33rd année, no 1, 1986, p. 56–57.
- Léon Daudet, La police politique : Ses moyens et ses crimes, (chapitre VI), Denoel et Steele, Paris, 1934
- Stefan Zweig, L'odyssée et la fin de Pierre Bonchamps, la tragédie de Philippe Daudet, (Irrfahrt und Ende Pierre Bonchamps. Die Tragödie Philippe Daudets), Neue Freie Presse, Vienne, 1926.
