= Marius Plateau =

French engineer, sergeant, and politician (1886–1923)

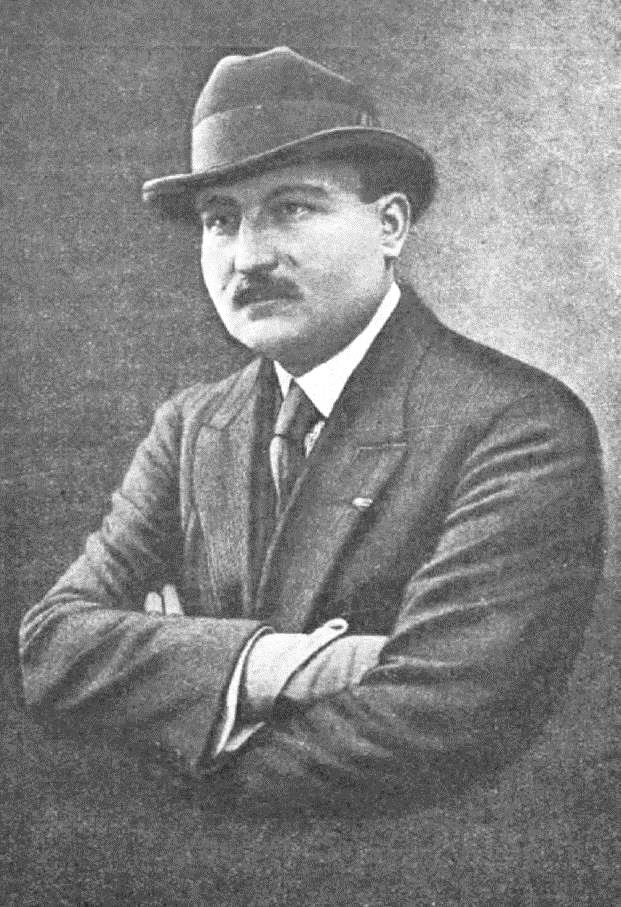
- Born: 8 July 1886; Paris, France
- Died: 22 January 1923 (aged 36); Paris, France
- Cause of death: Assassination by gunshot
- Resting place: Vaugirard Cemetery
- Occupations: Politician, engineer, political activist
- Organization: Action Française
- Movement: Camelots du Roi

Marius Plateau (8 July 1886, Paris – 22 January 1923, Paris) was a French engineer, WWI sergeant, and royalist militant. Plateau was an editor of the far-right journal of Action Française and a former secretary general of the Camelots du Roi. In 1923, Plateau was assassinated by the French anarchist Germaine Berton, who was later acquitted.

== Biography ==
Marius Plateau was born on 8 July 1886 in Paris. Plateau first entered politics in 1908 when he began selling the Revue d'Action Française newspaper, only a few weeks following its inception.

Plateau was involved in the second Thalamas affair, an effort to disrupt the teachings of Amédée Thalamas at the Sorbonne, following his ascension as a delegate to the Camelots du Roi. On 10 February 1909 Plateau, along with other delegates from Action Francaise, proclaimed “Thank you! It will put in my heart a little more hatred for your Republic," amongst other criticisms of the professor. This resulted in him being sentenced to two months in prison.

In October 1909, Plateau was appointed the Secretary General of the Camelots du Roi. In 1910, he, alongside the Camelots du Roi provided flood relief to families affected by the Great Flood of Paris. In 1911, Plateau was arrested for a demonstration against President Armand Fallières. That same year, he formed the National Federation of Camelots du Roi, unifying multiple smaller sects of the Camelots du Roi. He then became secretary general of Action Francaise.

Marius Plateau served as a sergeant during World War I, receiving a commendation for "exemplary courage" stating:

"Vaillant non-commissioned officer, on 20 September 1914, attacking the position of Port-Fontenoy, all the officers of the company having fallen, [he] burst onto a glacis beaten by extremely violent machine-gun fire, to create a diversion and attract the attention of the enemy. Carried off his men by his forceful and driving command, enthusing them with his ardour. Was seriously injured, after giving everyone the finest example of heroism and self-sacrifice."

Plateau left the military having sustained long-term disability and was left partially deaf.

== Assassination and burial ==
On 22 January 1923 Germaine Berton, a French anarchist, shot and killed Plateau with a revolver at the Action Francaise headquarters. Berton declared at her trial, "I considered Daudet and Maurras responsible for the occupation of the Ruhr" for her reason for the assassination. Berton had originally planned to assassinate Léon Daudet or Charles Maurras but neither were present at the time of the shooting. Plateau's assistant, Ernest Berger, attempted to assist Plateau after he was shot. Despite confessing, Berton was acquitted of the assassination on 24 December 1923. Action Française denounced the verdict as a "crime of the jury".

Following Plateau's death, Germaine's lover Armand Gohary was found to have committed suicide and a senior police officer involved in the case, Joseph Dumas, was found dead under suspicious circumstances. Action Française claimed the assassination was part of a larger "German–Bolshevist" plot and called for the mobilization of Camelots du Roi. This led to the vandalization of the printing press of the L'Œuvre newspaper on the evening of Plateau's death. According to the newspaper Le Populaire: "Violence and murder have struck the house [l'Action française] where the call to violence is daily and where political assassination is glorified" (a few days before, one person had died following a riot by the Camelots du Roi). In Revue d'Action Française, Robert Havard de La Montagne stated that "certain acts of violence are necessary and noble". The assassination led to an increased solidarity within Action Française, with Jacques Maritain writing to Charles Maurras: "The idea of the dangers you are running makes even dearer to the hearts of all those who love France and intelligence".

On the day of Plateau's burial, sculptor and future leader of Camelots du Roi, Maxime Real del Sarte commemorated the Monument to Marius Plateau in the cemetery of Vaugirard. During the burial, a crowd of tens of thousands of people rushed the Saint-Pierre-du-Gros-Caillou church; in the crowd were Maurice Barrès and Henry de Montherlant.

== Tributes ==
In 1930, members of Action française founded the Marius Plateau Association, an organization for former members of Action Française. Guy Steinbach led to the organization until his death in 2013.
