= Léon Daudet =

French journalist (1867–1942)

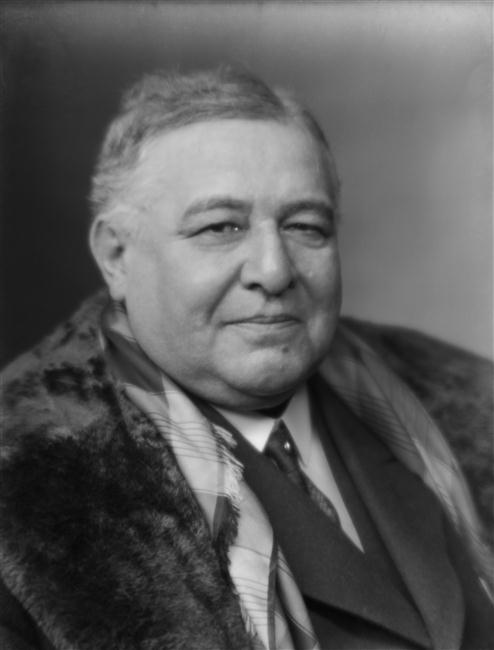
- Born: Alphonse Marie Vincent Léon Daudet; 16 November 1867; Paris, France
- Died: 2 July 1942 (aged 74); Saint-Rémy-de-Provence, Bouches-du-Rhône, Vichy France
- Occupations: Novelist, essayist, journalist
- Spouse(s): Jeanne Hugo (m. 1891; div. 1895) Marthe Allard (m. 1903)

Signature
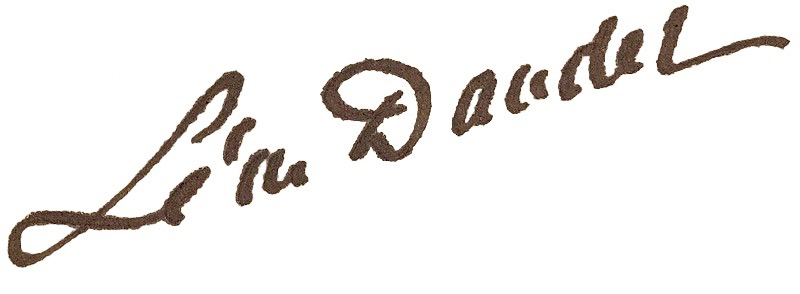

Léon Daudet (French: [leɔ̃ dodɛ]; 16 November 1867 – 2 July 1942) was a French journalist, writer, an active monarchist, and a member of the Académie Goncourt.

== Move to the right ==
Daudet was born in Paris. His father was the novelist Alphonse Daudet, his mother was Julia Daudet and his younger brother, Lucien Daudet, would also become an artist. He was educated at the Lycée Louis le Grand, and afterwards studied medicine, a profession which he abandoned. Léon Daudet married Jeanne Hugo, the granddaughter of Victor Hugo, in 1891 and thus entered into the higher social and intellectual circles of the French Third Republic. He divorced his wife in 1895 and became a vocal critic of the Republic, the Dreyfusard camp, and of democracy in general.

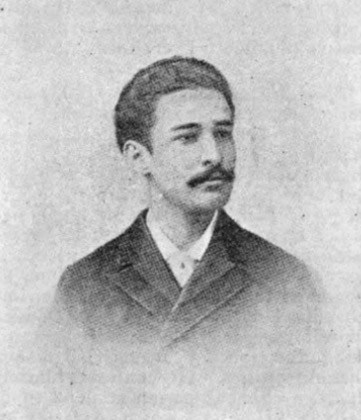
Daudet in July 1895 edition of The Bookman (New York City)

Together with Charles Maurras (who remained a lifelong friend), he co-founded (1907) and was an editor of the nationalist, integralist periodical L'Action Française. A deputy from 1919 to 1924, he failed to win election as a senator in 1927 – despite having gained prominence as the voice of the monarchists. When Maurras was released from prison after serving a sentence for verbally attacking Prime Minister Léon Blum, Daudet joined other political leaders Xavier Vallat, Darquier de Pellepoix, and Philippe Henriot to welcome him in the Vel' d'Hiv in July 1937.

== Scandals and later life ==
When his son Philippe was discovered fatally shot in 1923, Daudet accused the republican authorities of complicity with anarchist activists in what he believed to be a murder, and lost a lawsuit for defamation brought against him by the driver of the taxi in which Philippe's body was found. That same year, Germaine Berton carried out an assassination against fellow Action Française writer Marius Plateau. Daudet was also a target of this assassination but was not present at the time of the shooting.

Condemned to five months in prison, Daudet fled and was exiled in Belgium, receiving a pardon in 1930. In 1934, during the Stavisky Affair, he was to denounce Prime Minister Camille Chautemps, calling him the "leader of a gang of robbers and assassins". He also showed particular detestation for the subsequent Prime Minister Léon Blum, candidate of a coalition of socialists and other parties of the left.

A supporter of the Vichy administration headed by Marshal Pétain, Léon Daudet died in Saint-Rémy-de-Provence and is buried in its cemetery.

== Works ==
Novels

- Les Morticoles (1894).
- Le Voyage de Shakespeare (1896).
- Suzanne (1896).
- Sébastien Gouvès (1899).
- Les Deux Étreintes (1901).
- Le Partage de l'Enfant (1905).
- La Mésentente (1911).
- Le Lit de Procuste (1912).
- Le Cœur et l'Absence (1917).
- Dans la Lumière (1919).
- L'Amour est un Songe (1920).
- L'Entremetteuse (1921).
- Le Napus, Fléau de l'an 2227 (1927).
- Les Bacchantes (1931).
- Un Amour de Rabelais (1933).
- Médée (1935).

Essays

- L'Avant-guerre (1915).
- Contre l'Esprit Allemand de Kant à Krupp (1915).
- L'Hérédo, Essai sur le Drame Intérieur (1916).
- La Guerre Totale (1918).
- Le Poignard Dans le Dos: Notes sur l'Affaire Malvy (1918).
- Le Monde des Images: Suite de L'Hérédo (1919).
- Le Stupide XIXe Siècle (1922).
- Notre Provence (with Charles Maurras, 1933).

Pamphlets

- Le Nain de Lorraine - Raymond Poincaré (1930).
- Le Garde des Seaux - Louis Barthou (1930).
- Le Voyou De Passage - Aristide Briand (1930).

Miscellany

- Alphonse Daudet (1898).
- Souvenirs des Milieux Littéraires, Politiques, Artistiques et Médicaux (1914–1921):
  - Fantômes et Vivants (1914).
  - Devant la Douleur (1915).
  - L'Entre-Deux-Guerres (1915).
  - Salons et Journaux (1917).
  - Au Temps de Judas (1920).
  - Vers le Roi (1921).
- La Pluie de Sang (1932).
- Député de Paris (1933).
- Paris Vécu:
  - Rive Droite (1929).
  - Rive Gauche (1930).
- Quand Vivait mon Père (1940).

Works in English translation

- Alphonse Daudet (1898).
- Memoirs of Léon Daudet (1925).
- The Stupid Nineteenth Century (1928).
- Cloudy Trophy; the Romance of Victor Hugo (1938).
- The Tragic Life of Victor Hugo (1939).
- Clemenceau; a Stormy Life (1940).
- The Napus: The Great Plague of the Year 2227 (translated, annotated and introduced by Brian Stableford, 2013).
- The Bacchantes: A Dionysian Scientific Romance (translated, annotated and introduced by Brian Stableford, 2013).

Selected articles

- "The Overthrow of German Military Prestige," The Living Age, Vol. 302 (1919).
- "The Stupid Nineteenth Century," The Living Age, Vol. 312 (1922).
- "Sulla and His Destiny," The Living Age, Vol. 315 (1922).
- "Maeterlinck's Book on Ants," The Living Age, Vol. 339 (1930).
- "My Father Alphonse," The Living Age, Vol. 339 (1930).
