= André Colomer =

French poet, anarchist, and Communist (1886–1931)

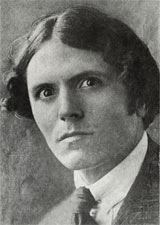
- Born: 1886
- Died: 1931 (aged 44–45)
- Education: Lycée Louis-le-Grand
- Military service
- Branch: French Army
- Conscripted: 1906

André Colomer (1886–1931) was a French poet, anarchist and later communist activist.

== Biography ==
=== Education ===
Colomer began writing poetry as a teenage school student. At the age of fourteen he sailed the Mediterranean after being expelled from his school in Bordeaux. During this time he visited Algeria, Portugal, Senegal, Spain, and Tunisia. By the age of seventeen, Colomer had returned to France to complete his baccalauréat in philosophy, earning a scholarship at the Lycée Louis-le-Grand for his khâgne, with the intention of entering the École normale supérieure. However, he did not get the results he wanted and instead completed a years military service in Perpignan in 1906. Thereafter, Colomer worked at the Collège de Blois followed by the Lycée Lakanal.

== Works ==
- Roland Malmos (novel)
- Le Réfractaire (drama in three acts)
- Bonimini contre le fascisme
- Répression de l'anarchisme en Russie soviétique (1923),
- À nous deux, Patrie!: la conquête de soi-même (memoirs), 1925

== Bibliography ==
- The information in this article is based on that in its French equivalent.
