= Bernard de Vésins =

French soldier and essayist

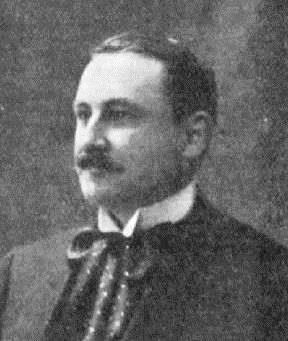
- Bernard de Vésins in 1922
- Born: Marie Joseph Pierre Bernard de Lévezou de Vésins; 13 March 1869; Bourges, Cher, France
- Died: 6 July 1951 (aged 82); Maisoncelles-du-Maine, Mayenne, France
- Occupations: Soldier, essayist
- Known for: Action Française militant

Count Bernard de Vésins (13 March 1869 – 6 July 1951) was a French soldier, essayist, practicing Catholic and right-wing Action Française militant. He was hostile to Freemasons, Jews and socialists, whom he considered to be working together in a conspiracy to undermine the traditional Catholic values of France. In the 1920s he was President of the Ligue d'Action Française during a period when the Catholic Church was disassociating itself from the movement.

== Life ==
=== Family ===
Marie Joseph Pierre Bernard de Lévezou de Vésins was born in Bourges, Cher, on 13 March 1869. His father was Count Victor de Lévezou de Vesins, and his mother was the daughter of Adrien de Forcade, sieur de La Grézère. On 15 April 1893 in Versailles he married Marie Augustine Camille de Gastebois (born 9 February 1874). They had two children, Marie Thérèse (1895–1988) and Gabrielle (1897–1928).

=== Pre-World War I ===
The political organization of Henri Vaugeois's Action Française movement, the Ligue d'Action Française, was launched in the spring of 1905, as was the Action Française Federation of Students, directed by Lucien Moreau. Members pledged to fight the republican regime and to support restoration of the monarchy under Prince Philippe, Duke of Orléans (1869–1926). Bernard de Vésins was among the many early members of the Action Française who were practicing Catholics, and included the art historian Louis Dimier and the essayist Léon de Montesquiou. They helped Charles Maurras (1868–1952) develop the royalist league's pro-Catholic policies. The league led resistance to the inventaires where the anti clerical French government aimed to confiscate church property in the winter of 1905–06. In Versailles, Bernard de Vésins was arrested and sentenced to two years in prison.

=== World War I (1914–18) ===
During World War I (1914–18) Vésins served in the 8th Field Artillery Regiment (8e RAC) and the 228th Artillery Regiment (228e RA). He was a colonel in the army. Vésins was made an Officer of the Legion of Honour on 29 April 1919, and was awarded the Croix de guerre 1914–1918 with palm and star.

=== Post World War I ===
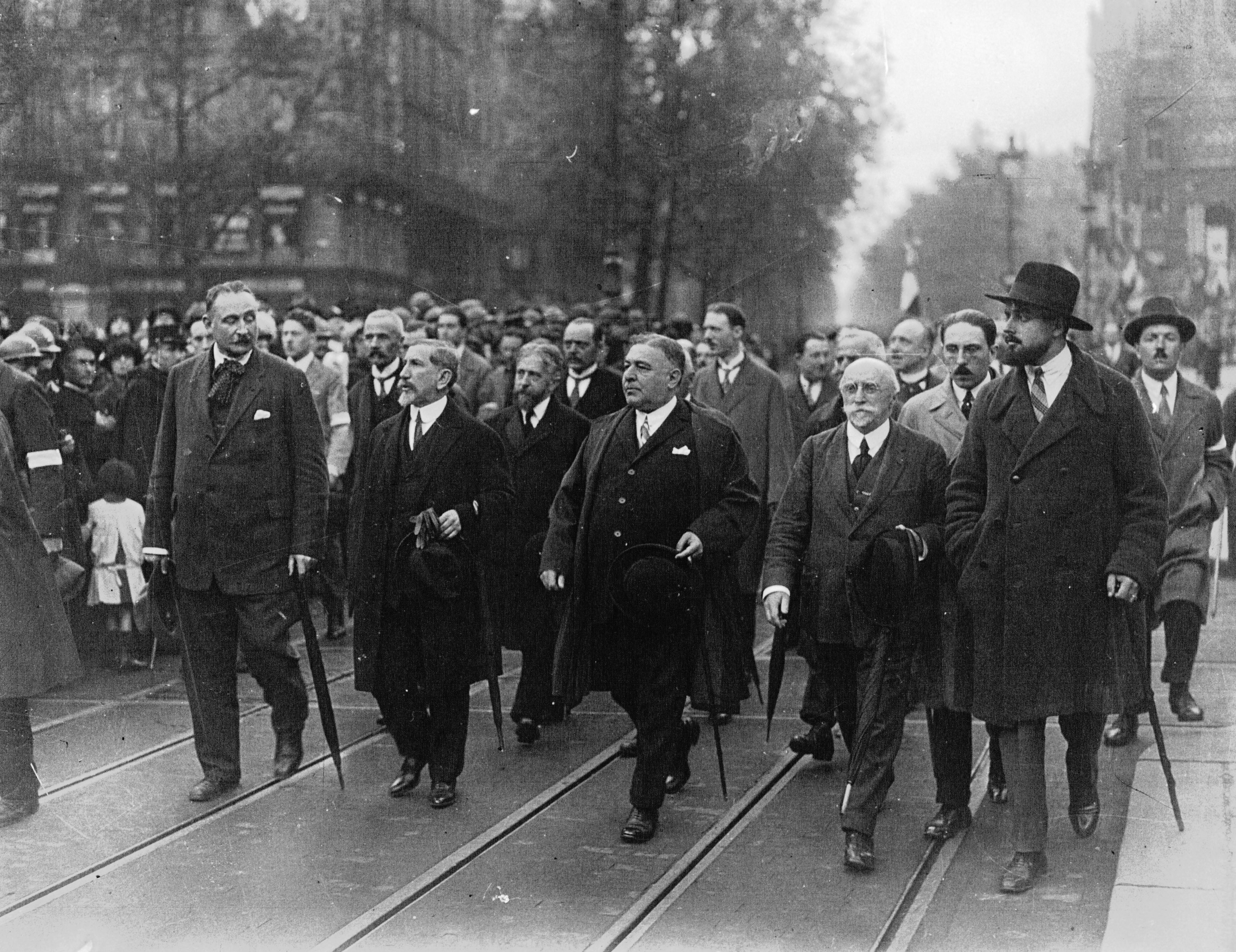
Les fêtes de Jeanne d'Arc, Paris, 1927. Front row left to right: Bernard de Vesins, Charles Maurras, Léon Daudet, Antoine Schwerer, Unidentified (with hat)

In the French legislative elections of 16 November 1919 Bernard de Vésins, president of the League, was defeated in the first district of Paris. Major Catholic conferences were organized under the auspices of Cardinal Mercier, starting in the winter of 1921–22. Charles Maurras and Bernard de Vesins attended in 1922. In late 1922 Georges Valois started working towards creating an Estates General of French Production, a movement that would bring together industrialists and leaders of labour unions to work on solutions to social and economic issues. The textile manufacturer Eugène Mathon headed the national committee, which included Valois, Jacques Arthuys, Bernard de Vésins and several others.

On 5 September 1926 Pope Pius XI wrote to Cardinal Andrieu confirming that the faithful were not free to blindly follow the leaders of the Action Française in matters that regard faith or morals. He wrote that their publications included "manifestations of a new religious, moral and social system, for example concerning God, the Incarnation, the Church and, generally, Catholic dogmas and morals, mainly in their necessary relations with politics, which is logically subordinate to morality. In essence, there is evidence in these manifestations of a revival of paganism to which naturalism is attached ... " The Ligue d'Action Française at first reacted mildly, and sent a respectful address to Cardinal Andrieu on 8 September signed by its leaders. On 16 September Bernard de Vésins, president of the League, sent a letter to the Pope that spoke of submission. However, the League did not recognise any wrong other than in detail.

French Church leaders tried to downplay any dispute between Rome and the League. On 22 November 1926 Bernard de Vésins announced to the League's annual congress that the Institut d'Action Française was being reopened, and had asked the Archbishop of Paris for theologians who would guard league members against the dangers the Pope had pointed out. However, a few days afterwards Admiral Schwerer, honorary president of the League, said that as a Catholic he was subject to the Church in religious matters, but as a Frenchman he was subject to the leaders of the League in political matters. He spoke out against people who were propagating abominable calumnies about the league to the Holy Father (the Pope).

On 30 November Cardinal Dubois, Archbishop of Paris, refused the request by Vésins, referring to recent lack of discipline and respect to religious authorities by the League. At the start of December a circular from the nunciature said bishops should not grant chaplains to Action Française groups because of the risk of confusion between religion and politics. Vesins resisted condemnation of the entire executive of the League by the Church. He visited Father Yves de La Brière on 8 January 1927, then informed the royalist pretender Prince Jean, Duke of Guise, that La Brière was under orders from the Vatican to form a rival organization in the hope of rallying Catholics from the Action Française, and was hoping for the duke's approval.

Bernard de Vésins resigned from the Action Française in 1930 after an internal conflict leading to the expulsion of Paul Guérin and Henri Martin and the departure of several of his friends, including François de la Motte. He was replaced as president of the League by Admiral Schwerer. He supported the Vichy Government during World War II (1939–45), but was not prosecuted for this after the war.

Bernard de Vésins died on 6 July 1951 at the age of 82.

== Views ==
Jean de Fabrègues described Bernard de Vésins as a "descendant of an old Rouergue family ..., prototype of a provincial gentleman full of honor and bravery, knowing only the duty to serve France, a passionate reader of Bonald, Blanc de Saint-Bonnet and La Tour du Pin, a fervent Catholic [...] who came to the Action Française with enthusiasm because he found in its doctrine the harmonious synthesis of his fidelity to the King, his taste for social justice and his beliefs." Bernard de Vésins became a theoretician of corporatism within the context of Social Catholicism and the work of René de La Tour du Pin.

In his article La Noblesse et les Privileges (Revue de l'Action Française, 15 September 1909) Bernard de Vésins defended the aristocracy, whose privileges were no more than a reasonable compensation for the benefits they provided in protecting the people and serving the state. Bernard de Vésins was quoted in February 1927 as saying ""Integral nationalism means that the monarchical solution satisfies all the needs of the country in the same way as an integral in mathematics represents the sum of all the values of an algebraic function." In L'action Française of 19 July 1910 Bernard de Vesins described France and Italy as "Catholic by a great majority ... impregnated with the Catholic and Roman culture ... indebted to the Church ... for what they are." In the same article he stated that the Freemasons had a conspiratorial alliance with Jews and socialist revolutionaries.

In 1921 Viscount d'Avenel published two articles in the Revue des deux Mondes in which he argued that the separation of Church and State had breathed new life into Catholicism in France. Bernard de Vesins attacked this "pretentious and empty historian" [d'Avenel] and his fanciful figures and deductions in L'Action Catholique of Quebec. He quoted the Bishop of La Rochelle in saying that during the war 83 priests had died and none had been ordained, the remaining priests were aging and the seminaries had few pupils. The bishop called the situation a "terrible crisis". Vesins concluded that there had been some renewal of religious practice, which rejoices the hearts of all faithful, who have seen good come out of evil, but that evil remains evil and must be abolished.

== Publications ==
- "Présentation", dans Joseph de Maistre, Considérations sur la France. Essai sur le principe générateur des Constitutions politiques, Paris, Nouvelle Librairie nationale, coll. « Nos maîtres », 1907.
- La Maison de France, Conférence prononcée le 15 février 1908 à Paris, Paris, Édition du Comité Tradition-Progrès, 1908.
- La Persécution religieuse. Politique d'abord !, Paris, Éditions de la Revue catholique et royaliste, [1908].
- (et al.), Comité royaliste de Montbrison, Réunion du 3 mars 1912 à Montbrison, Discours de M. le Cte de Villechaize, Mme la Mise de Mac-Mahon, M. le Cte Bernard de Vésins, M. Flachaire de Roustan. Suivi de ″Philippe VIII″, par Jules Lemaître, avec un portrait du duc d'Orléans, Montbrison, Imprimerie de J. Méchin (Comité royaliste de Montbrison. Réunion du 3 mars 1912 à Montbrison), [1912].
- Bernard de Vésins (1925), La Résistance des catholiques français. Mesures à prendre, conseils pratiques, Paris: Librairie de l'Action Française
- Bernard de Vésins (1927), "Introduction à l'étude des sciences sociales et économiques", Les Cahiers de la corporation, Paris: Union des corporations françaises
- Bernard de Vésins (1928), "Blanc de Saint-Bonnet", Les Cahiers de la corporation, Paris: Union des corporations françaises

== Sources ==
- Arnal, Oscar L. (April 1982), "The Nature and Success of Breton Christian Democracy: The Example of "L'Ouest-Eclair"", The Catholic Historical Review, 68 (2), Catholic University of America Press: 226–248, JSTOR 25021341
- Arnal, Oscar L. (1985-04-15), Ambivalent Alliance: The Catholic Church and the Action Française, 1899–1939, University of Pittsburgh Pre, ISBN 978-0-8229-7705-6
- Auzépy-Chavagnac, Véronique (2002), Jean De Fabrègues et la jeune droite catholique: Aux sources de la Révolution nationale (in French), Presses Univ. Septentrion, ISBN 978-2-85939-774-6
- Callu, Agnès; Gillet, Patricia (2008), "L'amiral Antoine Schwerer (1862–1936)", Lettres à Charles Maurras – Amitiés politiques, lettres autographes, 1898–1952 (in French), Presses universitaires du Septentrion
- Dansette, Adrien (September 1951), "L'Eglise et l'Action française: I: Jusqu'a la Condamnation", Esprit, Nouvelle série (in French), 182 (9), Editions Esprit: 275–299, JSTOR 24252374
- Dard, Olivier; Grunewald, Michel (2009), Charles Maurras et l'étranger – L'étranger et Charles Maurras: L'Action française – culture, politique, société II, Peter Lang, ISBN 978-3-0343-0039-1
- Dubois, J. (January–August 1908), M. Fernand Lamy (ed.), "Les Détenus de Marmande sous la Terreur (suite)", Revue de l'Agenais (in French), Académie des sciences, lettres et arts
- Goyet, Bruno (2001), Henri d'Orléans, comte de Paris (1908–1999) : le prince impossible (in French), Odile Jacob, ISBN 978-2-7381-0934-7
- Joly, Laurent (2006), "Les débuts de l'Action française (1899–1914) ou l'élaboration d'un nationalisme antisémite", Revue Historique (in French), 308 (3 (639)): 695–718, doi:10.3917/rhis.063.0695, JSTOR 40957800
- Laudouze, André (1989), Dominicains français et Action française, 1899–1940: Maurras au couvent, Editions de l'Atelier, ISBN 978-2-7082-2610-4
- Leymarie, Michel; Prévotat, Jacques (2008-02-10), L' Action française: culture, société, politique (in French), Presses Univ. Septentrion, ISBN 978-2-7574-0043-2
- Nival, Mathieu, "Marie Joseph Pierre Bernard DE LÉVEZOU DE VÉSINS", Geneanet (in French)
- Potin, Yann (6 March 2013), "6 mars 1906 : Inventaires après la séparation de l'Eglise et de l'Etat", France Inter (in French), Radio France
- "Un Mauvais Plaidoyer", The Catholic Historical Review, 7 (4), Catholic University of America Press, January 1922, JSTOR 25011849
- Weber, Eugen (1962), Action Française: Royalism and Reaction in Twentieth Century France, Stanford University Press, ISBN 978-0-8047-0134-1
- Wilson, Stephen (March 1976), "A View of the Past: Action Francaise Historiography and Its Socio-Political Function", The Historical Journal, 19 (1), Cambridge University Press: 135–161, doi:10.1017/S0018246X00018343, JSTOR 2638358, S2CID 144525082
