= La Revue critique des idées et des livres =

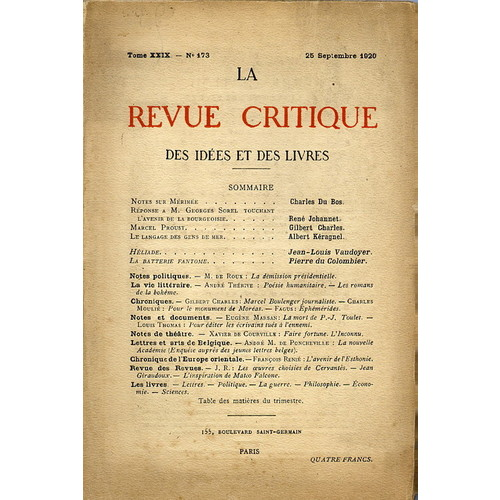
- Issue of the Revue critique from 25 September 1920
- Editor: Jean Rivain; Eugène Marsan
- Categories: Political review; Literary journal
- Frequency: Bi-monthly
- Publisher: Jean Rivain, Eugène Marsan
- First issue: 1908
- Final issue: 1924
- Country: France
- Based in: Paris
- Language: French

The Revue critique des idées et des livres (1908–1924) was a French bi-monthly journal of political and literary criticism published from 1908 to 1924. It was published by Jean Rivain and writer and literary critic Eugène Marsan. From 1908 Lucien Moreau and Jean Rivain were the key contributors to the review.

== Orientation of the Review ==
Inspired by the ideas of Charles Maurras and Action Française, the journal was, before World War I, a voice for the neo-classical school and literary nationalism. It was also closely associated with the syndicalist and neo-royalist ideas developed by the Cercle Proudhon, led by Henri Lagrange and Georges Valois. A proponent of federalism, it strongly supported the movement for decentralization and the revival of regional identities that emerged in the early 20th century.

Renowned for its literary quality and bringing together the elite of nationalist writers, the Revue critique quickly gained considerable influence. It engaged with the Nouvelle Revue française, launched at the same time by André Gide and Jacques Copeau, which also advocated a classical revival. It campaigned against Romanticism, "bovarysme" (a concept introduced by Jules de Gaultier), the decadent strain of symbolism, and contemporary theater.

== Defense of Classicism, Praise for Stendhal, Promotion of the École romane and École fantaisiste ==
Devoted to Stendhal, the journal advocated an open classicism as a living expression of French genius. It embraced diverse literary tastes, supporting the revival of regional literatures by highlighting the poets of the École romane, such as Maurice du Plessys, Raymond de La Tailhède, Ernest Raynaud, and Lionel des Rieux, as well as the young École fantaisiste, represented by Paul-Jean Toulet, Francis Carco, Jean-Marc Bernard, Tristan Derème, Tristan Klingsor, Jean Pellerin, and Léon Vérane. During the campaign led by Action française against the ideas of Henri Bergson in 1914, the journal's leaders refused to choose between their loyalty to Maurras and their admiration for Bergson, distancing themselves from the Maurrassian movement.

The journal published several special issues dedicated to figures such as Richelieu, Rousseau, Stendhal, Mistral, Moréas, and Barrès.

== Contributors ==
The review's contributors were heavily affected by World War I: seventeen young contributors, over one-third of its staff, were killed or went missing. The survivors relaunched the publication in 1919, but the new political and literary context was less favorable. The group dissolved in May 1924 to join the Revue universelle, recently created by Jacques Bainville and Henri Massis, which expressed a more traditional Maurrassian line, or other royalist-oriented reviews like Cahiers d'Occident, Latinité, and Revue du siècle.

Key collaborators included:

- Writers: Maurice Barrès, Charles Maurras, Henri de Régnier, Anna de Noailles, Henry Bordeaux, Paul Bourget, Léon Daudet, Jacques Boulenger, René Boylesve, Claude Aveline, Maurice Donnay, Adrien Mithouard
- Historians and essayists: Jacques Bainville, Georges Valois, Henri Lagrange
- Poets: Paul-Jean Toulet, Lionel des Rieux, Francis Carco, Jean-Marc Bernard
- Philosophers: Gonzague Truc, Gilbert Maire
- Literary Critics: André Rousseaux, Albert Thibaudet, Pierre Lasserre
- Journalists and activists: Paul Acker, Octave de Barral
- Art Critics: Louis Dimier, Pierre Lalo

== Bibliography ==
- François Huguenin, À l'école de l'Action française, Paris, Éditions Jean-Claude Lattès, 1999.
- Henri Clouard, Histoire de la littérature française, du symbolisme à nos jours, Paris, Éditions Albin Michel, 1949.

== See also ==
- Jean Rivain
- Eugène Marsan

== Sources ==
- Ferri, Laurent (2008-02-05), "Lucien Moreau (1872–1935)", Jewish Identities: Nationalism, Racism, and Utopianism in Twentieth-Century Music (in French), University of California Press, ISBN 978-0-520-25088-8
