= Institut d'Action française =

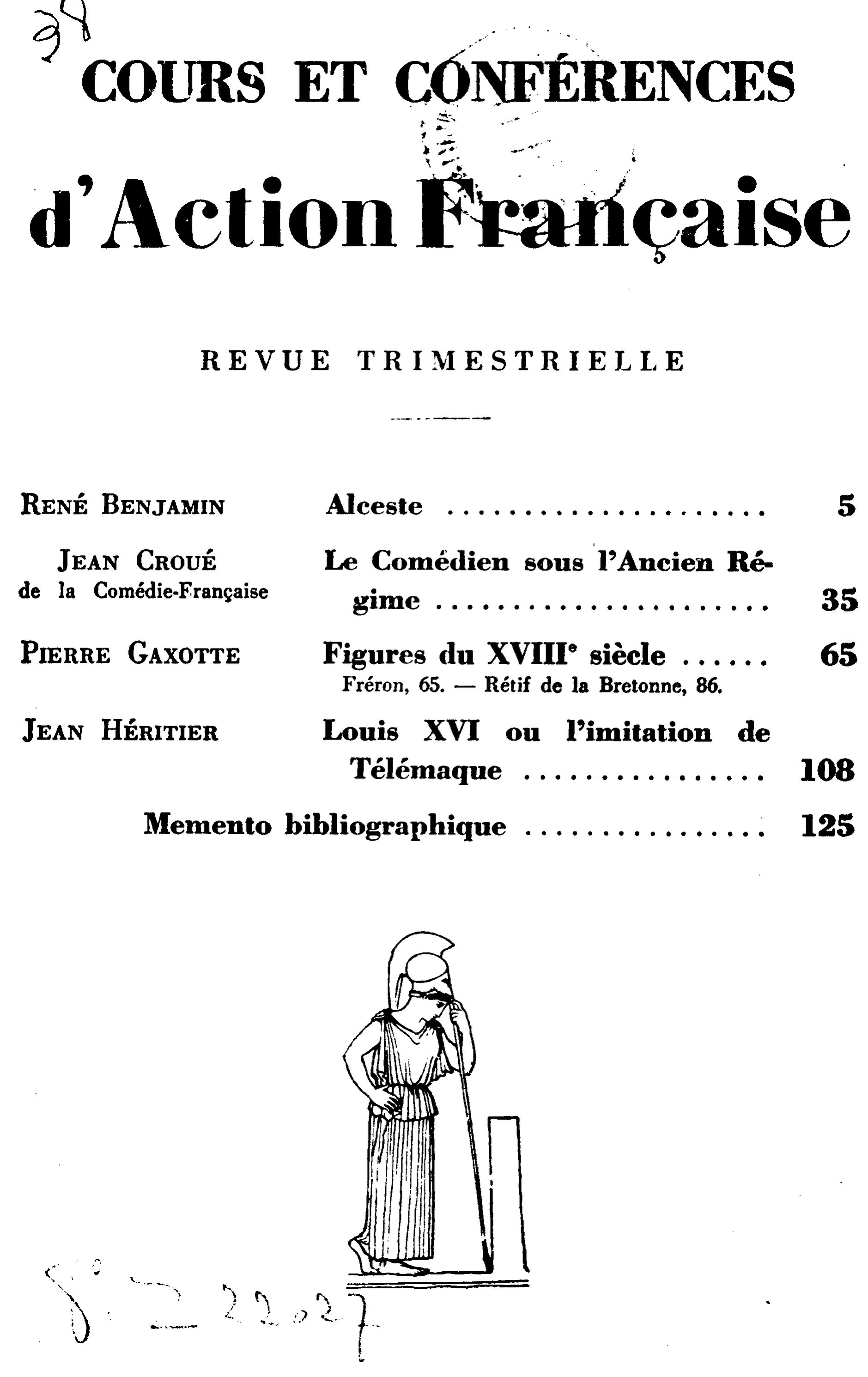
- Bulletin of the Courses of the Institut d'Action française from January 1929.
- Formation: February 1906
- Headquarters: 33 Rue Saint-André des Arts, 6th arrondissement of Paris
- Key people: Charles Maurras; Henri Vaugeois; Léon de Montesquiou; Louis Dimier

The Institut d'Action française was a French political training institute founded by the Action Française movement. It was established in February 1906 in Paris at the initiative of Léon de Montesquiou and implemented by Louis Dimier. The institute aimed to study in detail major political, social, and religious issues.

== History ==
At the dawn of the 20th century, the Action Française concluded that the Republican education system, from primary schools to universities, particularly in the teaching of history, had become a project of dismantling the French nation. This observation led to the creation of the Institut d'Action française in 1906. Historian Jacques Prévotat described the institute as a "kind of university created to oppose the Enlightenment and official universities." It was considered in Action Française Almanacs as an "institution of counter-revolutionary higher education." According to Louis Dimier, "the education proposed presupposes a fundamental hostility—an instructive and fertile hostility—between intelligence and the Revolution." The institute was envisioned as a training school for leaders.

The institute served two purposes: to counter the symbols of the Third Republic's academic institutions, such as the École libre des sciences politiques on Rue Saint-Guillaume and the Sorbonne, and to attract young individuals united by Lucien Moreau under the Action Française Students Federation.

After being interrupted during the First World War, the courses resumed regularly in 1919.

== Organization ==
The institute was initially financed by Louise de Courville, a friend of Charles Maurras and the Barrès family.

Originally, the institute had seven chairs, with additional ones added later:

- The Rivarol Chair on the history of political ideas, led by Louis Dimier;
- The Frédéric Amouretti Chair on international relations, entrusted to Jacques Bainville;
- The Fustel de Coulanges Chair on national history, occupied by historian Gustave Fagniez;
- The Syllabus Chair on the Syllabus of Errors, held by Dom Jean-Martial Besse;
- The Auguste Comte Chair on positive politics, entrusted to Léon de Montesquiou;
- The Maurice Barrès Chair on French nationalism, held by Lucien Moreau;
- The Sainte-Beuve Chair on organizational empiricism, managed by Charles Maurras;
- The René de La Tour du Pin Chair on social economy, held by Abbé Georges de Pascal;
- The Louis le Grand Chair on French intelligence, created in 1908 and awarded to Pierre Lasserre.

== Courses ==
Courses were free and open to students from Parisian and provincial universities as well as private institutions. They were held at 33 Rue Saint-André des Arts and administered from the headquarters of the newspaper L'Action française at 14 Rue de Rome.

The courses critiqued and denounced democratic ideas by studying the doctrines of the Republic and the major figures of democracy. They also covered laws, customs, and French history.

Louis Dimier presented counter-revolution as "a work of intelligence directed at dismantling what, for a hundred years in France, has been called the French Revolution." He organized the curriculum around six themes and thirteen authors, including:

- Politics: Joseph de Maistre, Louis de Bonald, Antoine de Rivarol, Honoré de Balzac
- Literature: Paul-Louis Courier, Charles-Augustin Sainte-Beuve
- Historical sciences: Hippolyte Taine, Ernest Renan, Numa Denis Fustel de Coulanges
- Social sciences: Frédéric Le Play, Pierre-Joseph Proudhon
- Art criticism: Study of Prix Goncourt winners
- Catholic counter-revolution: Louis Veuillot

== Publications ==
The bulletins of the Courses of the Institut d'Action française were initially published by the Jean Rivain bookshop and later by the Nouvelle Librairie nationale.

== Members ==
Notable lecturers at the institute included:

- Philippe Ariès
- Jacques Bainville
- Georges Bernanos
- Charles Maurras
- Lucien Moreau
- Raoul Girardet
