= Marsan (disambiguation) =

Marsan is commune in Gers, France.

Marsan may also refer to:

== People ==
- Armando Marsans (1887–1960), Major League Baseball outfielder
- Arnaut Guilhem de Marsan (fl. 1160–1180), Landais nobleman and troubadour
- Eddie Marsan (born 1968), British actor
- Eugène Marsan (1882–1936), French author and literary critic
- Georges Marsan (born 1957), Mayor of Monaco since 2003
- Jean Marsan (1920–1977), French screenwriter and actor
- Jeanne-Marie Marsan (1746–1807), French actress and singer
- Luis Marsans (1930–2015), Catalan painter
- Madame de Marsan (1720–1803), Countess de Marsan, Countess de Walhain, children's governess in France
- Marco Marsan (born 1957), American author
- Maurice de Marsan (1852–1929), French poet, novelist, and director
- Pierre Marsan (born 1948), Quebec politician

== Places ==
=== Azerbaijan ===
- Marsan, Azerbaijan, village and municipality in the Qakh Rayon

=== France ===
- Bretagne-de-Marsan, town and commune in the Landes département
- Mont-de-Marsan, commune, préfecture of the Landes département
- Villeneuve-de-Marsan, village and commune in the Landes département
