= Gonzague =

Gonzague is a masculine given name. Notable people with the name include:

- Gonzague de Reynold (1880–1970), Swiss writer and historian
- Gonzague Truc (1877–1972), French writer
- Gonzague Vandooren (born 1979), Belgian footballer
- Gonzague Saint Bris (1948–2017), French novelist, biographer and journalist

== See also ==
- House of Gonzaga
