= Abel-François Villemain =

French politician

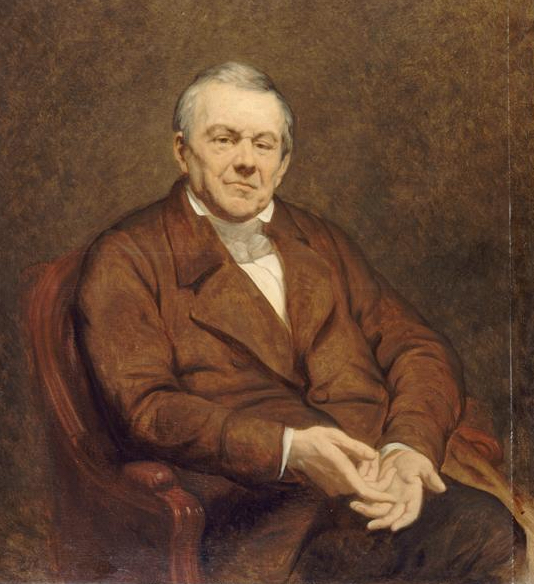
Portrait by Ary Scheffer, 1855

Abel-François Villemain (French pronunciation: [abɛl fʁɑ̃swa vilmɛ̃]; 9 June 1790 – 8 May 1870) was a French politician and writer.

== Biography ==
Villemain was born in Paris and educated at the Lycée Louis-le-Grand. He became assistant master at the Lycée Charlemagne, and subsequently at the École Normale. In 1812 he gained a prize from the academy with an essay on Michel de Montaigne. Under the restoration he was appointed, first, assistant professor of modern history, and then professor of French eloquence at the Sorbonne. Here he delivered a series of literary lectures which had an extraordinary effect on his younger contemporaries.

Villemain worked during the transition to the Romantic movement, and his lectures influenced the generation of writers that emerged around 1830. He appreciated English, German, Italian, and Spanish poetry while continuing to support classical Greek, Roman, and French literature.

In 1819 he published a book on Oliver Cromwell, and two years later he was elected to the academy. Villemain was appointed by the restoration government Chef de l'imprimerie et de la librairie, a post involving a kind of irregular censorship of the press, and afterwards to the office of master of requests. Before the July Revolution he had been deprived of his office for his liberal tendencies, and was elected deputy for Évreux in July 1830. Under Louis-Philippe he was made a Peer of France in 1832. He was a member of the council of public instruction, and was twice minister of that department, and he also became secretary of the academy. During the whole of the July Monarchy he was one of the chief dispensers of literary patronage in France, but in his later years his reputation declined. He died in Paris.

His wit was legendary; an anecdote has a fellow professor saying to him "I have discovered a gallicism in Cicero." The professor had been a revolutionary during the revolution, a follower of Napoleon during the Empire and a royalist during the restauration. Villemain answered quickly to him: "I found one too: «Quantae infidelitates! Quot amicorum fugae!»"

Villemain's chief work is his Cours de la littérature française (5 vols., 1828–1829). Among his other works are: Tableau de la littérature au Moyen Âge (2 vols., 1846); Tableau de la littérature au XVIII siècle (4 vols., 1864); Souvenirs contemporains (2 vols., 1856); Histoire de Grégoire VII (2 vols., 1873; Engl. trans., 1874).

Lautréamont assessed him thus: "Villemain is thirty-four times more intelligent than Eugène Sue and Frédéric Soulié. His preface to the Dictionary of the Academy will outlive the novels of Walter Scott and Fenimore Cooper, and all the novels conceivable and imaginable."

Among notices on Villemain may be cited that of Louis de Loménie (1841), E. Mirecourt (1858), J.L. Dubut (1875). See also Sainte-Beuve, Portraits (1841, vol. iii), and Causeries du lundi (vol. xi, "Notes et pensées").
