= Paul Copin-Albancelli =

Paul Copin-Albancelli (1851–1939, real name Paul-Joseph Copin) was a French journalist, nationalist and conspiracy author.

== Biography ==
A former boulangiste and Freemason, Copin-Albancelli used his experience to become one of the most vehement detractors of Freemasonry, which he, along with many anti-Dreyfusards of the time, associated with Jewish conspiracies. At the turn of the 20th century he founded the anti-Masonic and antisemitic newspapers À bas les tyrans (Down with tyrants) (with André Baron (Louis Dasté), and La Bastille. He led the league in defense against Freemasonry, which merged in 1906 with two leagues created by Émile Driant. The new entity was named Ligue française anti-maçonnique (French anti-Masonic League), and it also lived up to its name by invigorating the anti-Masonic movement. He was also occupied with publishing the society's publication La Renaissance française.

Copin-Albancelli was also one of the principal militant nationalists and royalists of Action Française. He collaborated on the Revue d'Action Française which became L'Action française edited by Charles Maurras. In parallel with these activities, Copin-Albancelli was also working with the Revue Internationale des Sociétés Secrètes (International Review of Secret Societies) of bishop Ernest Jouin, the famous detractor of freemasonry and whistleblower against alleged conspiracies linked to secret powers, he was also a member of the Movement for the Defense of national traditions (or Entente nationale), regrouping several royalists of the Action Française or independents.

Fearing the ruin of the Christian West to a "New World Order" (whose strings were pulled by Jews and Freemasons), Copin-Albancelli up until his death denounced various Judeo-Masonic conspiracies which, according to him, infiltrated the political world. In his belief that various secret organizations were trying to establish a "globalist power", Copin-Albancelli exploited a myth found in the same period in the Protocol of the Elders of Zion. The scheme was widely used to try to prove the type of conspiracy of which Copin-Albancelli became the tireless exposer.

== Publications ==
- Le Boulangisme du peuple ("The boulangism of the people"), Paris, L. Sauvaitre, 1891.
- La Franc-Maçonnerie et la question religieuse ("Freemasonry and the religious issue"), Paris, Perrin, 1892; 1905.
- La Question franc-maçonnique devant les électeurs ("The question of freemasonry to the voters"), Paris, L. Sauvaitre, 1893.
- Comment je suis entré dans la Franc-Maçonnerie et comment j'en suis sorti ("How I came into freemasonry and how I got out"), Paris, Perrin et Cie, 1895; 1905; 1908.
- La dictature-maçonnique ("The masonic dictatorship"). Sauvaitre, 1893. Lecture delivered on 16 December 1899, Paris, offices of Action Française, 1899 [1900]; Paris, F. Dupont, [1901].
- (With Léon de Montesquiou, dr. Le Fur, dr. Rondeau, Marc Sangnier, Henri de Larègle and Gustave de Lamarzelle) Nos Traditions nationales, comment les défendre ? ("How to defend our national traditions?") Conferences. With the minutes of the 1st meeting of the Entente nationale held at the hall of the Geographical Society on 8 July 1904, with a letter by Paul Bourget, Bourges, proceedings of Entente National [1904].
- (With M. Millerand, Roger Lambelin, admiral La Jaille and dr. Le Fur), L'Armée et la Franc-maçonnerie ("The Army and Freemasonry"), Bourges, proceedings of Entente National, [1905].
- Le Drame maçonnique. Le Pouvoir occulte contre la France ("The masonic drama. The hidden power against France"), Lyon and Paris, E. Vitte and La Renaissance française, 1908.
- La Question des boys-scouts ou éclaireurs en France ("The Question of scouts in France"), Paris, La Renaissance française, 1913.
- "Preface" of Benjamin Fabre, Un initié des sociétés secrètes supérieures "Franciscus, eques a capite galeato" ("An initiate of higher secret societies 'Franciscus, knights of capite galeato'") (1753–1814), Paris, La Renaissance française, 1913.
- Les Éclaireurs de France ("The scouts of Franc"), Paris, R. Tancrède, [1914].
- Une correspondance adressée à M. Clémenceau par Copin-Albancelli ("A correspondence addressed to Mr. Clemenceau by Copin-Albancelli") : I. Tancred, [1914]. Possibilité de l'union entre les Français. Premières lettres à M. Clémenceau. La question religieuse durant la guerre ("Possibility of the union among the French. First letters to Mr. Clemenceau. The religious issue during the war"); II. Quatrième lettre à M. Clémenceau. La franc-maçonnerie, la démocratie et la République ("Fourth letter to Mr. Clemenceau. Freemasonry, democracy and the Republic"), Paris, La Renaissance française, [1916].
- La Guerre occulte. Les Sociétés secrètes contre des nations ("The occult war. Secret societies against nations"), Paris, Perrin et Cie, 1925.
