= Henri Lagrange =

French journalist and activist (1893-1915)

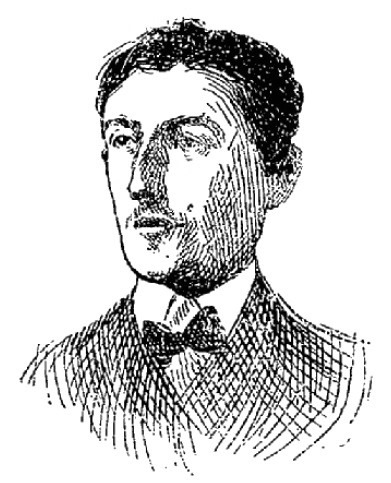
- Henri Lagrange in L'Almanach de l'Action française (1911).
- Born: Henri Eugène Georges Lagrange; 21 November 1893; Paris, France
- Died: 30 October 1915 (aged 21); Montereau-Fault-Yonne, Seine-et-Marne
- Military career
- Allegiance: France
- Branch: French Army
- Rank: Adjutant
- Unit: 103rd Infantry Regiment
- Conflicts: World War I

Henri Lagrange (21 November 1893 – 30 October 1915) was a French journalist and monarchist activist.

== Biography ==
Henri Eugène Georges Lagrange was born in Paris on 21 November 1893. He published his first article in Revue critique des idées et des livres in 1910 at the age of 16, attracting the attention of Maurice Barrès and Romain Rolland. A Camelot du roi, he became famous for allegedly insulting President Armand Fallières or shouting "Down with the Republic!" during the festivities in Rouen on 23 June 1911, celebrating the millennium of Normandy's annexation to France. This act resulted in a six-month prison sentence, served under common law, despite efforts on his behalf by over 150 writers and artists, including Guillaume Apollinaire, Frédéric Mistral, and Francis Jammes. He was released after 139 days, on 8 November 1911.

This act earned him significant popularity among the Fédération nationale des étudiants d'Action française (Students of Action française), where he became Secretary General in 1913. However, he was expelled from Action française on 5 June 1914 for "activism," accused of planning a coup against the Republic.

He befriended Georges Valois and sought to bridge nationalist monarchists with revolutionary syndicalists, drawing on the political legacy of Georges Sorel and co-founding the Cercle Proudhon.

In August 1914, he volunteered for military service, declaring, "It is the duty of intellectuals to set an example." Serving as an adjutant in the 103rd Infantry Regiment, he was critically wounded during an attack on Auberive on 6 October 1915 and succumbed to his injuries on 30 October in a hospital in Montereau-Fault-Yonne.

== Tributes ==
Charles Maurras, with whom Lagrange unsuccessfully attempted reconciliation before his deployment, referred to him as the "prince of youth" in the preface to a posthumous collection of Lagrange's writings, Vingt ans en 1914. Études politiques et littéraires, portraits et polémiques, lettres de guerre (1920). Maurice Barrès dedicated pages to him in Familles spirituelles de la France (1917), describing him as a "storm bird" and "torrent stone, full of sparks." In 1924, Georges Valois dedicated his essay La Révolution nationale to Lagrange. Georges Bernanos also referenced him in his novel Under the Sun of Satan (1926), stating, "The new generation was clearly marked by his sacrifice."

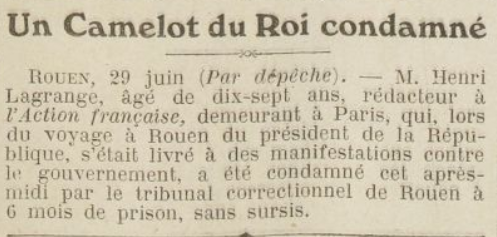
Henri Lagrange sentenced to six months in prison on 29 June 1911.

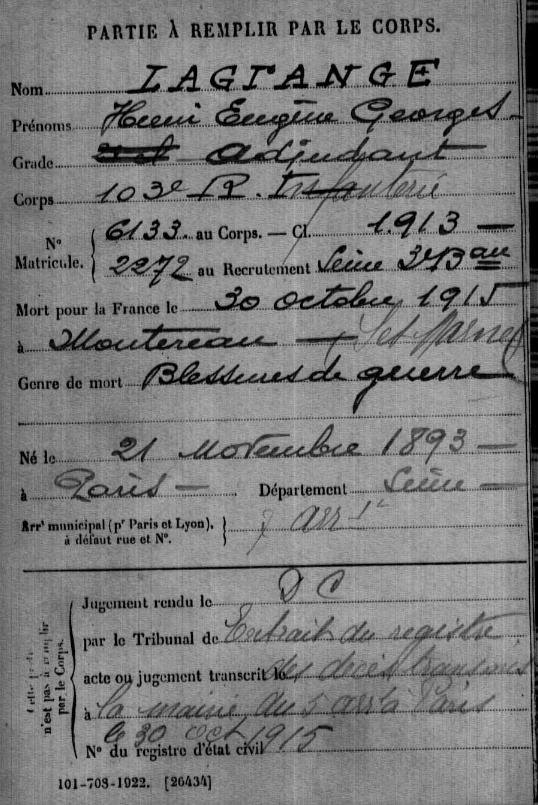
Henri Lagrange, fallen for France, 30 October 1915.

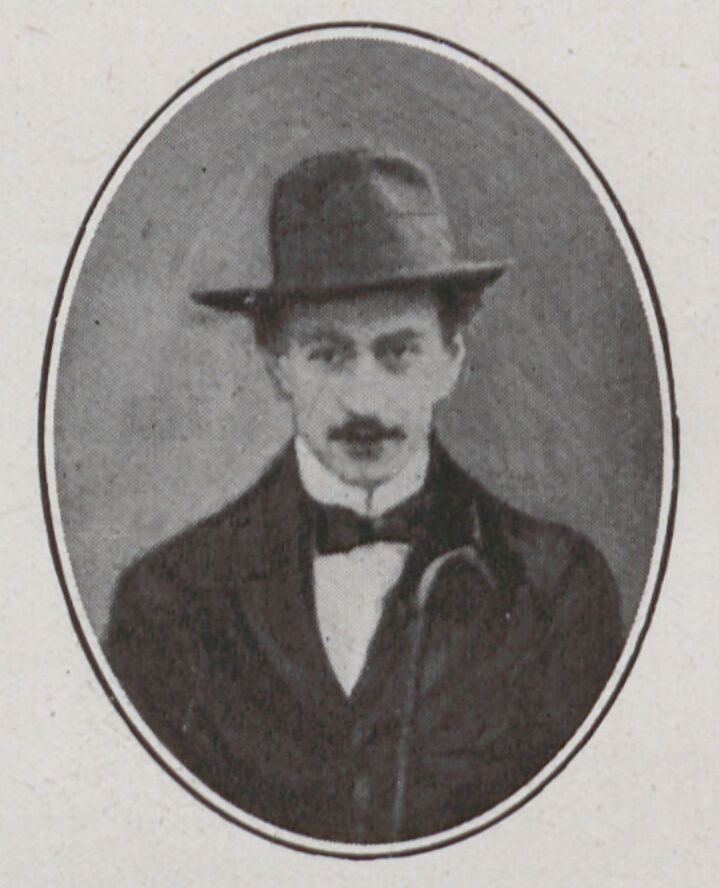
Medallion of Henri Lagrange in L'Almanach de l'Action française (1919).

== Legacy ==
A YouTube channel titled Cercle Henri Lagrange has existed since 21 May 2014.

Lagrange is often mistakenly confused with Lucien Lacour, who slapped Prime Minister Aristide Briand, but contrary to some reports, Lagrange never struck President Armand Fallières.

== Works ==
- Gérard de Nerval, Paris, Éditions de la Revue critique, 1911.
- Introduction to Pierre-Joseph Proudhon, Les femmelins. Les grandes figures romantiques..., Paris, Nouvelle Librairie nationale, 1912.
- Vingt ans en 1914. Études politiques et littéraires, portraits et polémiques, lettres de guerre, preface by Charles Maurras, Paris, Nouvelle Librairie nationale, 1920.

== Bibliography ==
- Charles Maurras (1921). "Henri Lagrange". Tombeaux. Nouvelle Librairie nationale. pp. 136–144.
- Pierre Andreu (10 April 1936). "Demain sur nos tombeaux". Combat (in French) (4): 7.
