= Fédération nationale des étudiants d'Action française =

National Federation of Action Française Students
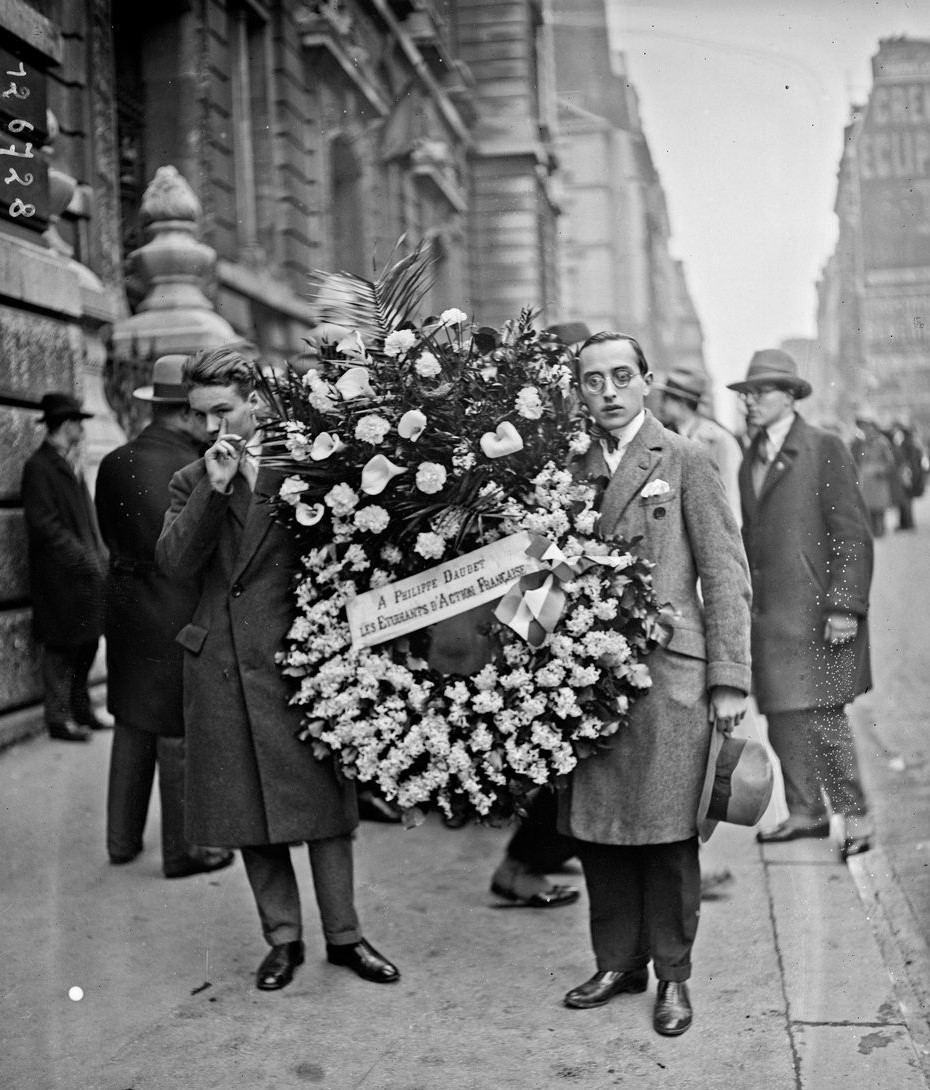
- Demonstration by Action Française Students in tribute to Philippe Daudet on February 16, 1928.
- Formation: 1913
- Dissolved: February 13, 1936
- Headquarters: 33 rue Saint-André des Arts, 75006 Paris
- President: Lucien Moreau (1905–1909); Maurice Pujo (1909–1936)
- Vice_president: Georges Calzant (1927–1936)
- Secretary general: René Bernard d'Aubeigné (1911–1913); Pierre de Rarécourt de la Vallée, Viscount of Pimodan (1913); Henri Lagrange (1913–1914); René-Aimé Paillard (1914–1916); Jean Huet (1916–1918); Emmanuel Beau (1918–1923); Georges Calzant (1923–1927); Félix Duraud (1927–1928); Gabriel Jeantet (1928–1929); Félicien Maudet (1930); Georges Lefort (1930); Bernard Van de Velde (1931–1932); Rémy Barrier (1932); Jean Wilkin (1932–1935); Robert Castille (1935–1936)
- Treasurer: Marcel Guitton (1911–1936)
- Publication: L'Étudiant français

The Fédération nationale des étudiants d'Action française (National Federation of Action Française Students) was an organization uniting student activists of the Action Française movement. The first Action Française Students' Association was created on December 8, 1905, in Paris by Lucien Moreau, and was strengthened in 1913 with the formation of the national federation. The group was officially dissolved on February 13, 1936, following Action Française's involvement in the assault on Léon Blum.

== History ==
=== Foundation ===
According to Charles Maurras, youth were at the forefront of "the confrontation against the Republic and its outdated elites." The organization aimed to create significant agitation to provoke a coup and to cultivate an elite.

On December 8, 1905, Lucien Moreau founded the first Action Française Students group in Île-de-France. Other groups followed, such as those in Angers (January 20, 1909) and Lille (May 12, 1910). The goal was to study and propagate the Action Française doctrine: "The group aims to study and promote nationalism within academic circles, fostering camaraderie and friendship among all students aligned with the principles of integral nationalism."

The organization was closely tied to the Institut d'Action française, founded in 1906 as an "institution of higher education against revolution." Both institutions shared premises at 33 rue Saint-André des Arts in the 6th arrondissement of Paris. The headquarters featured a library, reading room, fencing hall, and facilities for literary, artistic, and athletic meetings.

By 1913, the growing number of members led Maurice Pujo to establish a national federation, with Henri Lagrange serving as its first general secretary.

=== World War I ===
The outbreak of World War I interrupted the federation's activities, but some chapters remained active by including high school and middle school students.

The war inflicted heavy losses on the group, with 10 of its 12 secretaries general and deputies killed.

=== Postwar Period ===
After the war, the federation quickly reorganized. In 1920, it launched the journal L'Étudiant français, which was widely read in Paris, with a circulation of 2,300 copies by 1921.

=== Dissolution ===
On February 13, 1936, following an attack on Léon Blum, the federation was dissolved under the Law of January 10, 1936, on combat groups and private militias.

== Activities ==
Members participated in selling the L'Action Française and L'Étudiant français newspapers and provided security at events. They were also involved in demonstrations, often in university settings such as the Latin Quarter.

== Bibliography ==
- Anne-Catherine Schmidt-Trimborn (2017). La ligue d’action française: Mode d’organisation et pratiques culturelles, sociales et politiques (1905–1936). Université de Lorraine.
