= Paul Acker =

French journalist (1874–1915)

Paul-Théodore Acker
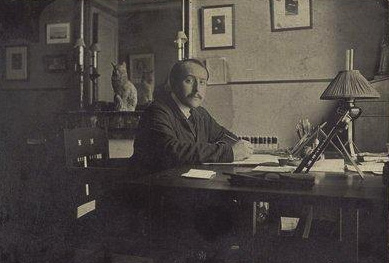
- Paul Acker
- Born: September 14, 1874; Saverne, Alsace-Lorraine, German Empire
- Died: June 27, 1915 (aged 40); Thann, Alsace-Lorraine, German Empire
- Occupations: Writer, journalist

Paul-Théodore Acker (14 September 1874 – 27 June 1915) was a French-language writer of popular novels.

== Biography ==
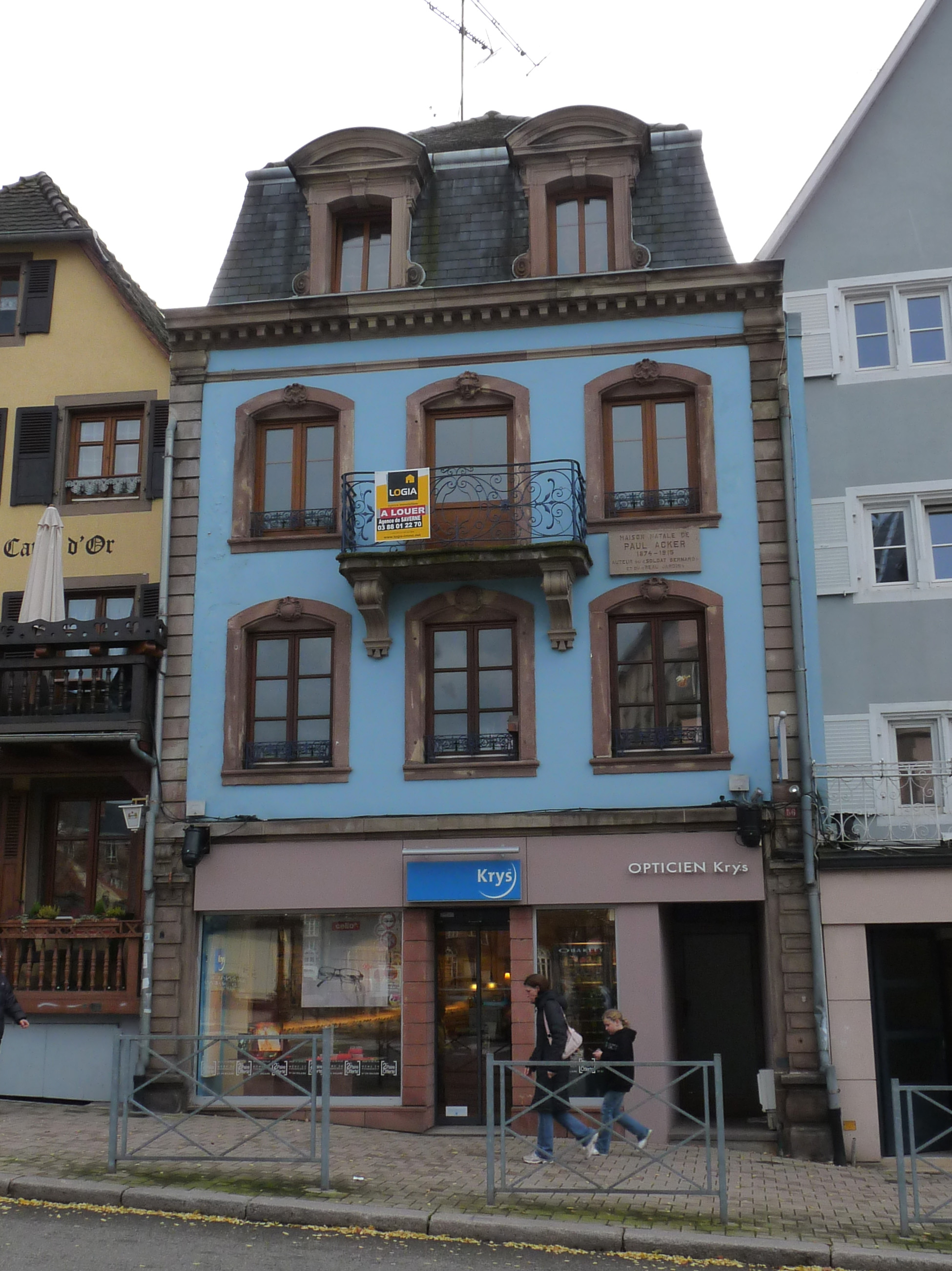
Birthplace in Saverne

Paul Acker was born on 14 September 1874 in Saverne.

A journalist, he contributed to Le Gaulois, L'Écho de Paris, Revue des deux Mondes, L'Illustration, Revue de Paris, and Revue critique des idées et des livres.

On 27 June 1915, he was killed in a car accident while on military service near the Thann front. He was buried in Saverne on 11 August 1922. A memorial stele was erected in his memory by the Souvenir français in Goldbach. Charles Maurras paid him posthumous tribute in his book Tombeaux and mentioned his membership in the Action française.

== Selected works ==
- Dispensé de l'Article 23 (preface by Willy, illustrated cover by Charles Léandre), 1898, H. Simonis-Empis
- Un mari sans femme, 1902, Librairie Molière
- Petites confessions. Visites et portraits, 1905
- La Petite Madame de Thianges, 1906, Calmann Lévy
- Le Désir de vivre, 1907, Calmann Lévy
- Œuvres sociales des femmes, 1908, Plon-Nourrit Read online
- Le Soldat Bernard, 1909, Fayard
- Les Exilés, 1911, Plon (several editions until 1920)
- Le Beau Jardin, 1910, Plon (several editions until 1919)
- Une ville industrielle alsacienne: Mulhouse, 1912
- Les deux cahiers, 1912, Plon-Nourrit Read online
- Les deux amours, 1914
- Les Demoiselles Bertram, 1914, Plon-Nourrit
- Trois tombes, 1916, Plon-Nourrit
- L'Oiseau vainqueur, 1916, Flammarion
- Entre deux rives, 1917, Plon
- Colmar : une ville alsacienne, 1919, Éd. de la Haute-Alsace
- Tante Babiole - Collection Stella
- Les Deux Cahiers - Collection Stella
- Les Exilés - Select-Collection
- Les Exilés, preface by Jean-Noël Grandhomme, Éditions Laborintus, Lille-Paris, 2016, ISBN 979-10-94464-12-0

== Distinctions ==
- Paul Acker was awarded the first Grand Prix du Roman de l'Académie française for his body of work in 1915.
- Paul Acker is listed among the writers who died for their country on the Panthéon's list of people cited.

== See also ==
- Pierre Bucher

== Bibliography ==
- Henry Bordeaux, Trois tombes. (La Prière pour les absents. Max Doumic. Paul Acker. Maurice Deroure. Les Honneurs aux morts.), Plon-Nourrit, Paris, 1916, XIII-291 p.
- Alphonse Wollbrett, "Paul Acker", in Nouveau dictionnaire de biographie alsacienne, vol. 1, p. 13.
- Julia Schroda (2017). "Acker, Paul". In Roland Recht and Jean-Claude Richez (ed.). Dictionnaire culturel de Strasbourg, 1880-1930. Strasbourg: Presses universitaires de Strasbourg. p. 23. ISBN 978-2-8682-0988-7..
- Maurras, Charles (1921). "Paul Acker et Fabrice Cléret". Tombeaux. Nouvelle Librairie nationale. pp. 69–71.
