= Antoine Schwerer =

French naval officer

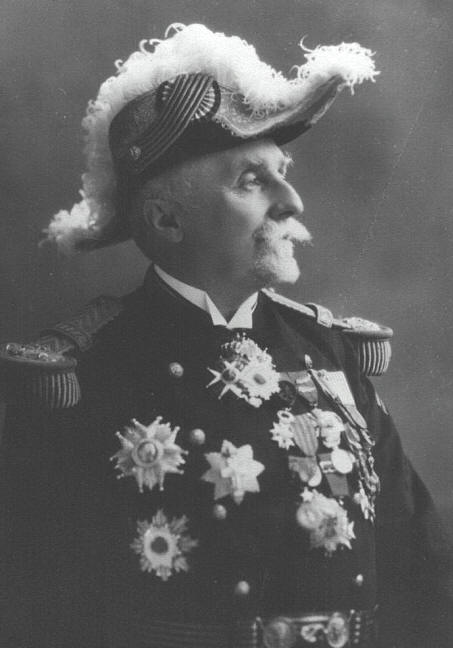
- "L'amiral Schwerer" (1926)
- Born: Zéphirin-Alexandre-Antoine Schwerer; 9 February 1862; Lorient, Morbihan, France
- Died: 3 November 1936 (age 74); Grand-Fougeray, Ille-et-Vilaine, France
- Occupation: Naval officer

Admiral Antoine Schwerer (9 February 1862 – 3 November 1936) was a French naval officer. He served in varied roles in many parts of the world, and published a number of technical papers. He rose through the ranks to become an admiral during World War I (1914–18). After retiring in 1924 he was involved with the right-wing and monarchist League of the Action Française. He was president of the League from 1930 to 1935.

== Life ==
=== Early years (1862–83) ===
Zéphirin-Alexandre-Antoine Schwerer was born in Lorient, Morbihan, on 9 February 1862. His father was Antoine Barthélemy Schvérer, a Major general of the navy (Major général de la Marine). He entered the École Navale in October 1878. He graduated from the 2nd class on 1 August 1880 and from the 1st class on 5 October 1881. He was assigned to the Resolue, then made a voyage to the Antilles on the Flore. He was assigned to the Marengo and then to the Trident. In March 1883 he was on the Clorinde, stationed at Newfoundland.

=== Ensign and lieutenant (1883–1902) ===
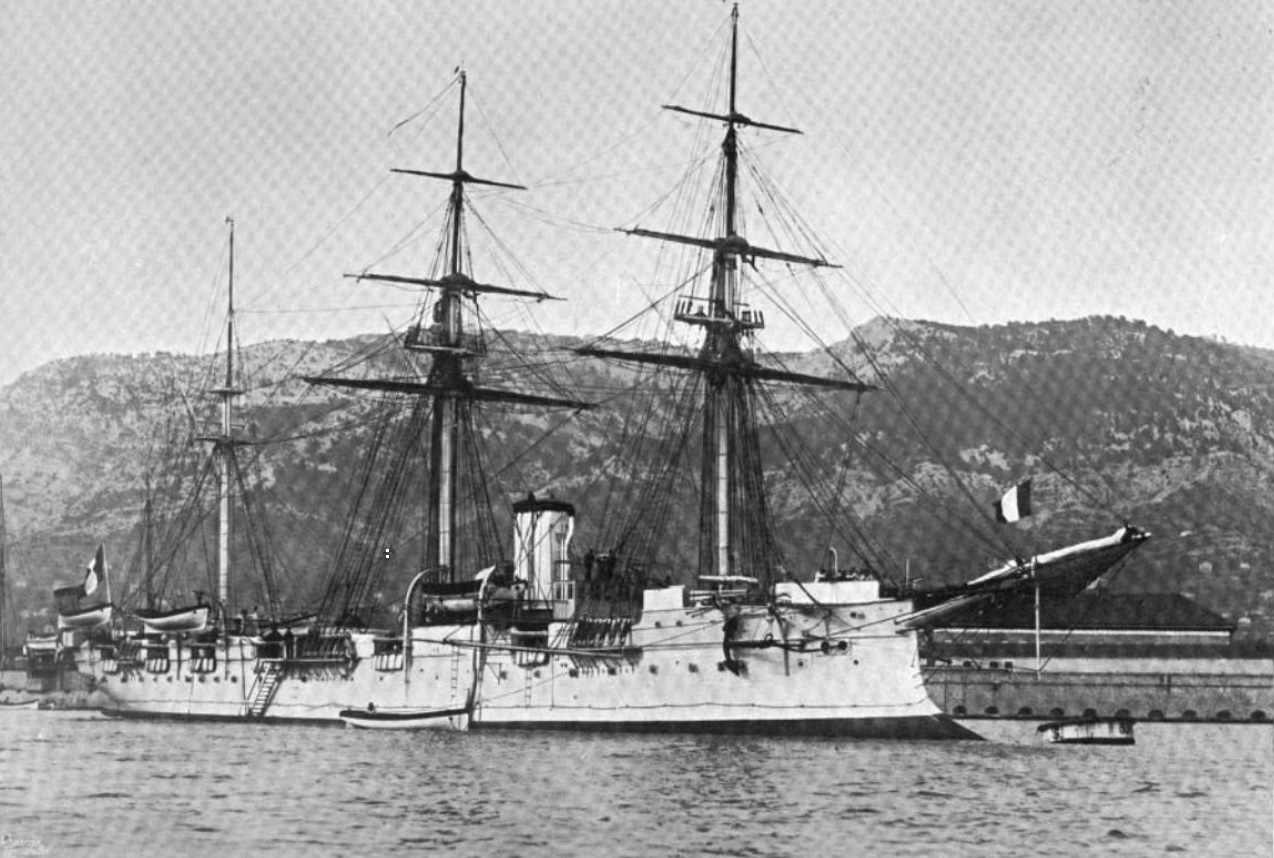
Cruiser Lapérousse c. 1885

Schwerer was promoted to ensign (enseigne de vaisseau) on 5 October 1883 in the port of Lorient, and was assigned to the corvette Eumenide. During the Sino-French War, in late 1884 he participated in the blockade of Formosa. On 1 January 1885 he was posted to the cruiser Rigault-de-Genouilly in the Far East Squadron. On 1 January 1886 Schwerer's ship was transferred to the Levant Naval Division. He was posted to the Albatros in January 1887, then was admitted to the Corps des Elèves Officiers aux Fusiliers Marins in Lorient.

Schwerer was promoted to Lieutenant (Lieutenant de vaisseau) on 23 June 1888. In March 1889 he was assigned to the Paris Observatory at the Parc Montsouris under Vice-Admiral Mouchez. In 1890 he was assigned to the Lapérouse on the Newfoundland station, and in 1891 transferred to La Clochetterie on the same station. In April 1892 he was on the coastguard Fulminant. He taught navigation on the Iphigenie in August 1892 and again on 1 January 1894 under Jules Lefevre. He was made a knight of the Legion of Honour on 12 July 1893.

In July 1895, during a voyage that researched terrestrial magnetism on the Dubourdieu, Schwerer wrote his Instructions théoriques et pratiques sur l’horizon gyroscopique. He was assigned to the Atlantic naval division under Jean Valat. In June 1896 on the Drôme he was in charge of preliminary soundings for laying a transatlantic cable between Boston and Brest. In February 1897 he was appointed to the command of the Ardent, stationed on the West Africa coast. In January 1898 he was appointed commander of the Caravan transport on the Newfoundland and Iceland station. On 16 October 1899 he was appointed Aide de Camp at the headquarters of the Maritime Prefect of the 3rd district in Lorient, and on 9 April 1900 was appointed Aide de Camp of the Maritime Prefect (Vice-Admiral Beaumont) of the 5th district in Toulon.

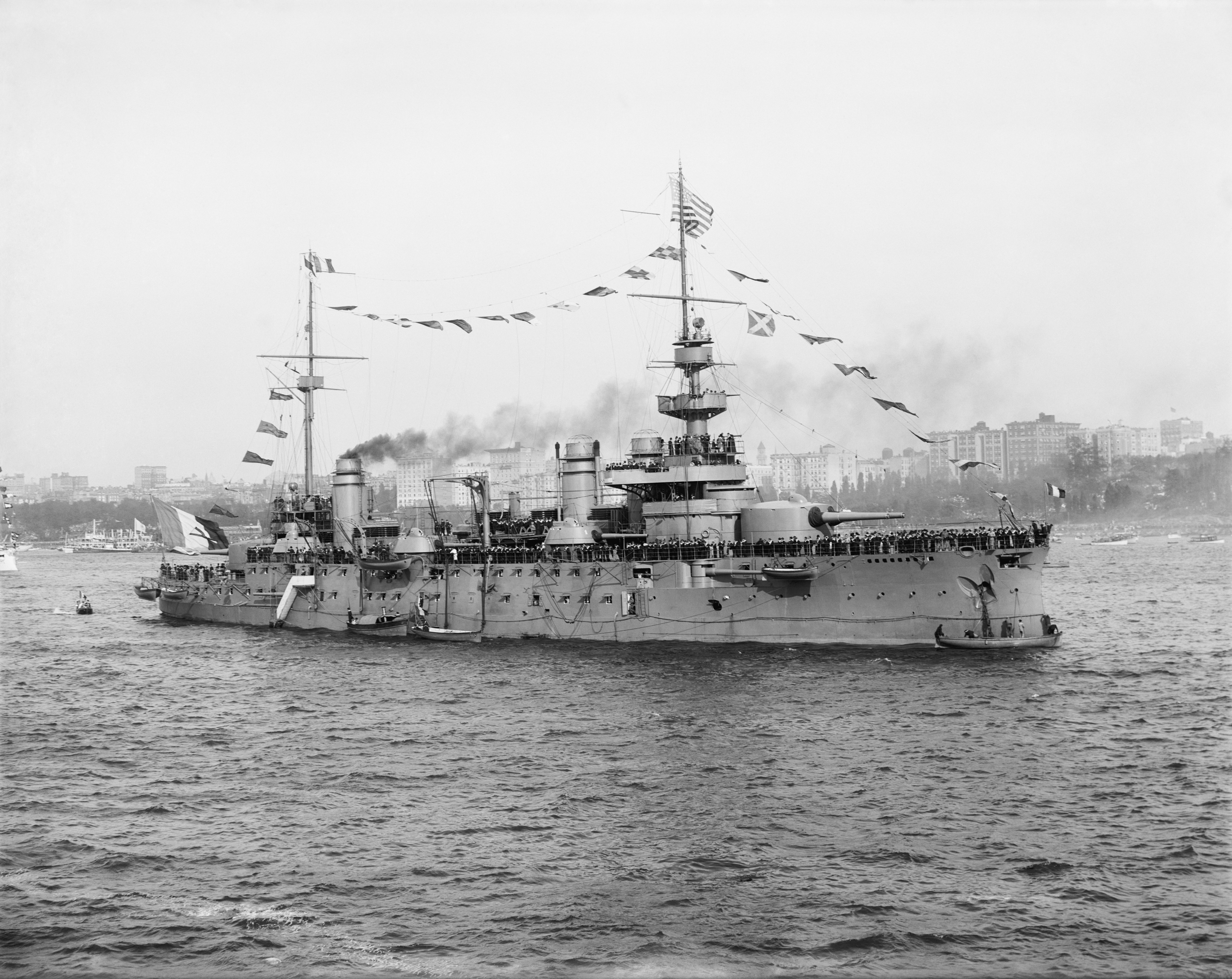
Battleship Justice c. 1909

=== Commander and Captain (1902–1914) ===
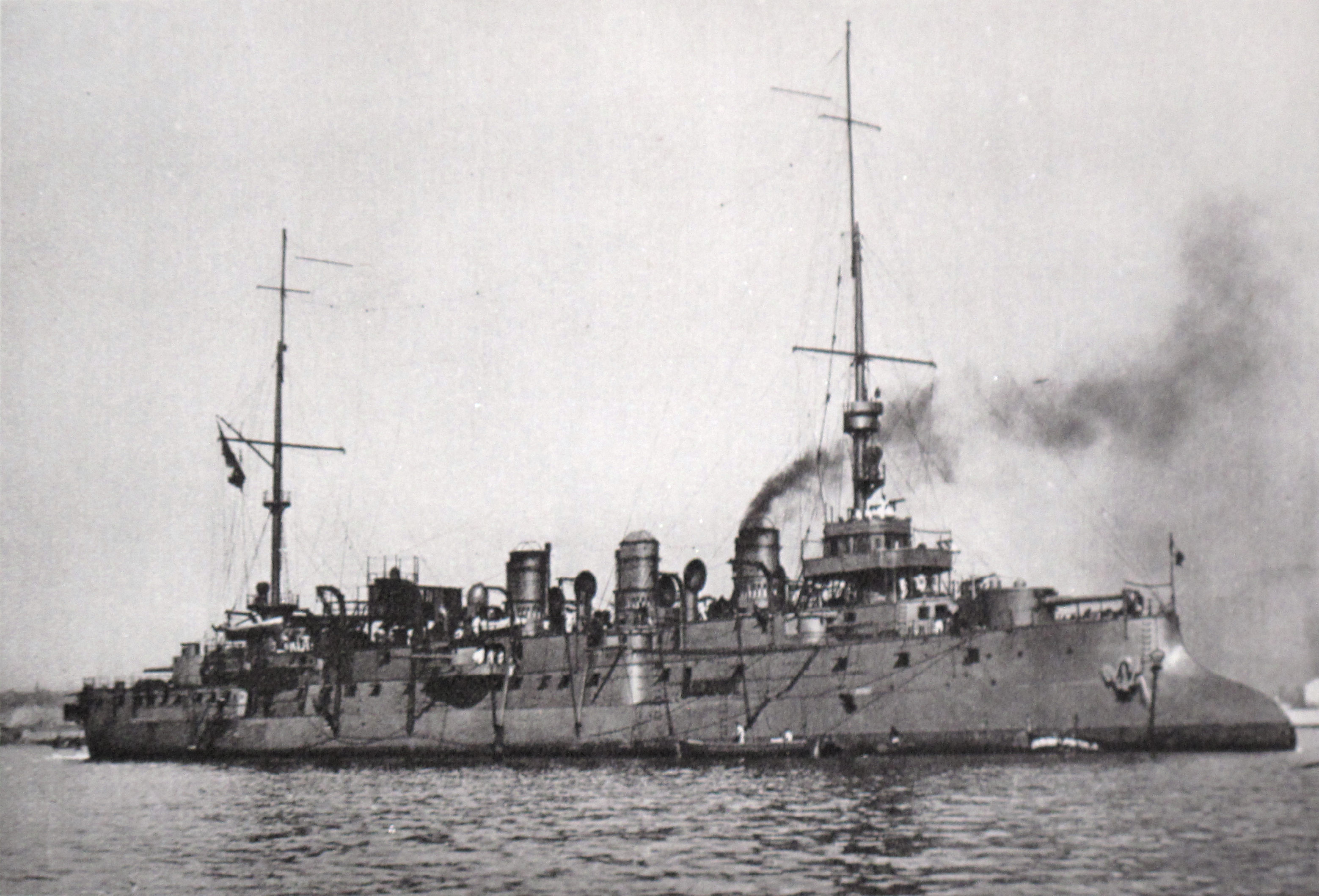
French armoured cruiser Pothuau

Schwerer was promoted to Commander (Capitaine de frégate) on 1 April 1902. On 1 January 1903 he was second in command on the ironclad Marceau in trials at Toulon, under Octave Le Clerc. In July 1903 on the Masséna he was aide de camp to Admiral Léonce Albert Caillard, commander of the North Squadron. He published an article in the Revue Maritime et Coloniale defending the role of the battleship. On 10 October 1906 he was given command of the Cassini for a mission to the Baltic and the Scandinavian countries. On 7 June 1907 he was appointed to the Technical Committee of the navy. On 5 October 1908 he was assigned to teach naval tactics at the École supérieure de guerre navale, then became a lecturer at the École Supérieure de la Marine in Paris, where he gave a course on foreign navies.

Schwerer was promoted to Captain (Capitaine de vaisseau) on 9 April 1909. On 1 January 1911 he was given command of the battleship Justice, the flag carrier of Rear Admiral Jean Gaschard, commander of a division of the 1st squadron. He was a member of the commission of inquiry appointed by Paul Painlevé, president of the navy committee, after the explosions of the battleships Iéna on 12 March 1907 and Liberté on 25 September 1911. He wrote a "Report on Naval Powders" (1912). On 1 January 1912 he was assigned to the port of Lorient. In March 1912 he commanded the gunnery training school on the cruiser Pothuau. His son Antoine Charles joined the navy in 1913.

=== High command (1914–24) ===
Schwerer was made Deputy Chief of Staff of the Navy on 20 May 1914 under Rear Admiral Louis-Joseph Pivet. After the outbreak of World War I (1914–18), on 6 August 1914 Schwerer and Prince Louis of Battenberg signed a convention in London on the division of responsibilities between the two navies. The convention confirmed the terms of the Entente Cordiale, and placed France in command of all naval operations in the Mediterranean. Malta and Gibraltar would both be treated as French naval bases. In the event that Austria entered the war France would act against its naval forces, and would at minimum prevent them passing the Strait of Otranto.

On 4 May 1915 Schwerer was given command of the flotilla of fluvial gunboats, then on 28 May 1915 he was given command of the batteries of fluvial gunboats. He was cited by the army for his role in Belgium and Champagne. On 4 November 1915 he was appointed Chief of Staff to Admiral Marie-Jean-Lucien Lacaze, Minister of the Navy. He was promoted to Commodore (Contre-Amiral) on 5 November 1915. On 4 June 1917 he was given command of the ocean and channel patrols, with the duties of protecting convoys and fighting submarines. He made the aviso Somme his flagship. He was promoted to Rear admiral (Vice-Amiral) in June 1918.

In July 1919 Schwerer was a member of the Supreme Council of the Navy and Inspector General of Military Personnel of the Fleet. In July 1921 he was appointed Maritime Prefect at Brest. In July 1922 he was appointed Commander in Chief of the Atlantic frontier at Lorient. He left active service in February 1924.

=== Last years (1924–1936) ===
Les fêtes de Jeanne d'Arc, Paris, 1927. Front row left to right: Bernard de Vésins, Charles Maurras, Léon Daudet, Antoine Schwerer, Unidentified (with hat)

In his memoirs, published in 1933, Schwerer states that he rejected the French Third Republic in favour of royalism at an early age. After his retirement in 1924 Schwerer devoted himself to the royalist League of the Action francaise, becoming one of the movement's most active leaders. He became president of the League in 1930, succeeding Bernard de Vésins in difficult circumstances. He was a talented orator. At the December 1931 congress, "greeted by loud acclamation", he gave a full presentation of "the general situation of France", external, financial, economic, interior and religious. He concluded with a passionate statement,

... the situation is very dark. It would be almost desperate if there were not a cell that is not huge, but that is alive and is the only one able to animate the amorphous environment that surrounds it. This cell is the Action française. Every day more people understand it. There will always be imbeciles in France, men of bad faith, madmen and criminals; but there are in our midst many excellent elements now deceived and blinded. Our task is to enlighten them and then to train them to the assault. It requires a huge effort pursued with perseverance. The job is tough. We will not do it by sitting in a good armchair, in flowery salons, lavishing sweet smiles and honeyed words, fighting in white gloves with dainty foils. We must be ready for hard sacrifices. Are you all ready? You want the restoration of the Monarchy. Have you all done what is necessary to achieve this?

Antoine Schwerer was forced by illness to retire to Brittany in 1935. He was succeeded as head of the League by François de Lassus. He died in Grand-Fougeray, Ille-et-Vilaine, on 3 November 1936.

== Decorations ==
Schwerer was an Officer of the Royal Order of Cambodia, Officer of the Order of the Crown of Italy and Officer of the Order of Saint Anna (Russia). He was decorated by Admiral Tōgō Heihachirō with the Order of the Rising Sun. He was a Knight of the Spanish Naval Order of Merit and a Commander of the Order of St. Olav (Denmark). On 9 July 1907 he was made an Officer of the Legion of Honour. In March 1909 he was made a Knight of the Order of the Sacred Treasure (Japan). On 10 July 1917 he was made a Commander of the Legion of Honour. He was awarded the Croix de Guerre in December 1918 and the Grand Cross of the Legion of Honour on 10 July 1920.

== Publications ==
Publications by Antoine Schwerer included:

- Antoine Schwerer (1892), "Étude sur le magnétisme terrestre à Terre-Neuve, par M. A. Schwerer,...", Extrait des "Annales Hydrographiques, Paris: Impr. nationale: 29
- Antoine Schwerer (1895), Étude sur la loi des tempêtes, Paris: L. Baudoin, p. 39
- Antoine Schwerer (1896), "Observations magnétiques en mer à bord du croiseur "le Dubourdieu"", Annales hydrographiques, Paris: Impr. nationale: 125
- Antoine Schwerer (1896), "Sondages effectués par "la Drôme" dans l'Atlantique Nord, sous la direction de M. Poncelet", Annales hydrographiques (Rapport d'ensemble dressé par MM. les lieutenants de vaisseau Poncelet de Schwerer), Paris: Impr. nationale: 31
- Antoine Schwerer (1897), "Instructions théoriques et pratiques sur l'horizon gyroscopique dans le vide, de M. le contre-amiral Fleuriais, par M. Schwerer,...", Annales hydrographiques, Paris: Impr. nationale: 48
- Antoine Schwerer (1906), "Le Cuirassé n'a pas fait faillite", Revue maritime, janvier-février-mars 1905, Paris: R. Chapelot: 24
- Antoine Schwerer (1912), Rapport concernant les poudres de la marine, présenté à M. le ministre à la suite de l'enquête qui lui a été confiée, Paris: Impr. nationale, p. 268
- Antoine Schwerer (1933), Souvenirs de ma vie maritime (1878-1914), preface by Charles Maurras, Paris: S.G.I.E., pp. 189 p

== Sources ==
- Antoine Schwerer (1862-1936) (in French), BnF: Bibliotheque nationale de France
- Callu, Agnès (2008-01-28), Lettres à Charles Maurras: Amitiés politiques, lettres autographes, 1898-1952 (in French), Presses Univ. Septentrion, ISBN 978-2-7574-0044-9
- Dulou, Bernard, "Zéphirin Alexandre Antoine SCHWERER", ecole.nav.traditions (in French)
- Hood, Chalmers (August 1984), "The French Navy and Parliament between the Wars", The International History Review, 6 (3), Taylor & Francis, Ltd.: 386–403, doi:10.1080/07075332.1984.9640349, JSTOR 40105393
- Koburger, Charles W. (2001), The Central Powers in the Adriatic, 1914-1918: War in a Narrow Sea, Greenwood Publishing Group, ISBN 978-0-275-97071-0
