= Edmond de Mandat-Grancey =

French journalist, writer and naval officer

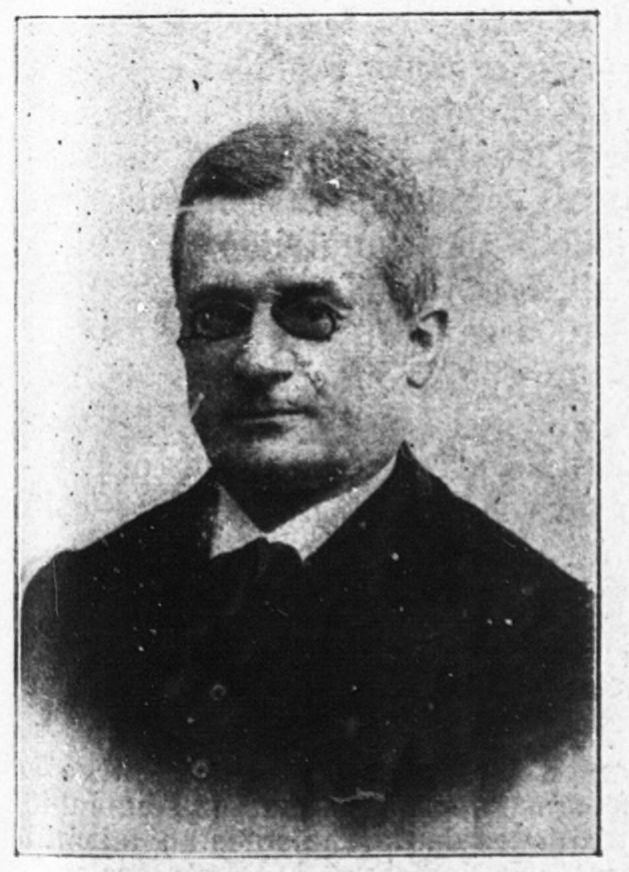
Edmond de Mandat-Grancey

Baron Edmond de Mandat-Grancey (the good) (1842–1911), was a French journalist, writer and naval officer.

== Life ==
After serving in the army, baron de Mandat-Grancey went on long travels. Starting in the 1880s he wrote a series of articles for le Correspondant on his trip into west Canada. He also published many works on his trip to Chicago, New York and Dakota in the United States of America, in which he put the French public on guard against what he saw as American "imperialism".

Mandat-Grancey also visited Madagascar, the French Congo and the Congo Free State (owned by king Leopold II of Belgium) as well as Greece and Ireland, writing memoirs of his trips there. At the turn of the century, the name of Mandat-Grancey would be associated with the royalism of Charles Maurras and the Action Française. He was one of the first contributors to the Revue d'Action française (founded by Henri Vaugeois and Maurice Pujo in 1899). He collected his articles in one volume as Le Clergé français et le Concordat (Paris, Perrin) in 1905.

== Works ==
- Dans les montagnes rocheuses (In the Rocky Mountains, 1884)
- En visite chez l'oncle Sam : (Visiting Uncle Sam's home, New York et Chicago, 1885)
- Chez Paddy (Paddy At Home, 1887)
- La brèche aux buffles. Un ranch français dans le Dakota (Buffalo gap - a French ranch in Dakota, 1889)
- Chez John Bull, journal d'un rural (In John Bull's home - journal of a rural stay, 1895)
- Au Congo (1898). Impressions d'un touriste (In the Congo 1898 - a tourist's impressions, 1900)
- Aux pays d'Homère (In the lands of Homer, 1902)
- Souvenirs de la côte d'Afrique (Memoirs of the coast of Africa - Madagascar, Saint-Barnabé)
- Le Clergé français et le Concordat (The French Clergy and the Concordat - Paris)
