= Emmanuel Beau de Loménie =

French journalist

- Born: February 4, 1896; Paris, France
- Died: February 8, 1974; Paris, France
- Occupation(s): Journalist, author
- Relatives: Louis de Loménie (paternal grandfather)

Emmanuel Beau de Loménie (1896-1974) was a French journalist and political writer.

== Early life ==
Emmanuel Beau de Loménie was born on February 4, 1896, in Paris, France. His paternal grandfather, Louis de Loménie, was an essayist.

== Career ==
Beau de Loménie was a journalist and a teacher. He was a contributor to conservative journals like Écrits de Paris, La France catholique or Carrefour.

Beau de Loménie was the author of many political books. He wrote about François-René de Chateaubriand, Édouard Drumont and Charles Maurras. With Les responsabilités des dynasties bourgeoises, he wrote a five-volume study of bourgeois families who supposedly controlled the fate of France, from the French Revolution to World War II. In L'Algérie trahie par l'argent, he wrote a defense of French Algeria, arguing that French civilization was superior. He was also "openly antisemitic".

== Death ==
Beau de Loménie died on February 8, 1974, in Paris, France.

== Works ==
- Beau de Loménie, Emmanuel (1929). La carrière politique de Chateaubriand de 1814 à 1830. Paris: Plon. OCLC 2790938.
- Beau de Loménie, Emmanuel (1930). Les demeures de Chateaubriand. Paris: Les Éditions des portiques. OCLC 3021106.
- Beau de Loménie, Emmanuel (1931). Qu'appelez-vous droite et gauche?. Paris: Dauphin. OCLC 64299045.
- Beau de Loménie, Emmanuel (1932). La restauration manquée : L'affaire du drapeau blanc. Paris: Éditions des portiques. OCLC 11482166.
- Beau de Loménie, Emmanuel (1933). D'une génération à l'autre. Paris: Cahiers de la quinzaine. OCLC 20767606.
- Beau de Loménie, Emmanuelu (1934). L'Inauguration. Paris. OCLC 557590112.
- Beau de Loménie, Emmanuel (1937). Naissance de la Nation roumaine, de Byzance à Étienne-le-Grand de Moldavie. Bucarest. OCLC 3257645.
- Beau de Loménie, Emmanuel; Hardy, Jean (1937). Pour une révolution économique française dans la paix sociale. Paris: Les Editions du signal. OCLC 23008247.
- Beau de Loménie, Emmanuel (1943–1973). Les responsabilités des dynasties bourgeoises. Paris: Denoël. OCLC 7974553.
- Beau de Loménie, Emmanuel (1944). Lendemains de Libération. OCLC 11660254.
- Beau de Loménie, Emmanuel (1945). Le débat de ratification du traité de Versailles à la Chambre des députés et dans la presse en 1919. Paris: Denoël. OCLC 7013685.
- Beau de Loménie, Emmanuel (1951). La mort de la Troisième République. Paris: Editions du Conquistador. OCLC 1853756.
- Beau de Loménie, Emmanuel (1953). Maurras et son système. Bourg: E.T.L. OCLC 231972698.
- Beau de Loménie, Emmanuel (1956). Chroniques de la Quatrième. Éditions Denoël. OCLC 12770658.
- Beau de Loménie, Emmanuel (1957). L'Église et l'État : un problème permanent. Paris: Fayard. OCLC 4029480.
- Beau de Loménie, Emmanuel (1957). L'Algérie trahie par l'argent. Paris: Éditions Etheel. OCLC 458676264.
- Beau de Loménie, Emmanuel (1964). Les Glorieux de la décadence. Paris: Au fil d'Ariane. OCLC 6429975.
- Beau de Loménie, Emmanuel (1968). Édouard Drumont ou l'Anticapitalisme national. Paris: J.J. Pauvert. OCLC 9608688.
- Beau de Loménie, Emmanuel (1980). Les Pollueurs de l'histoire. Paris: La Librairie française. OCLC 8765228.
