= Louise de Courville =

Children's book author and royalist activist

- Born: Louise Anne Marie Rondel; 25 August 1860; Avignon, France
- Died: 23 February 1937 (aged 76); 7th arrondissement of Paris, France

Louise de Courville (née Rondel; 25 August 1860 in Avignon – 23 February 1937 in Paris) better known as Comtesse de Courville, was a French author of children's books and a militant of Action française.

== Biography ==
Born into a bourgeois family, Louise Rondel was the daughter of an engineer with the Ponts et Chaussées. She was also the cousin of Auguste Rondel. In 1886, she married Count Maurice de Courville (1860–1944), a military engineer and director of the Schneider factories, responsible for manufacturing heavy artillery for the French army.

Passionate about literature, the Comtesse de Courville published several children's novels between 1896 and 1899. Concurrently, she hosted a salon at her apartment on the Rue du Cherche-Midi, where she became a close friend of Charles Maurras and Maurice Barrès. She was described as a “woman of social and networking prowess."

Alongside the Marquise de Mac Mahon, she worked to mobilize sections of royalist women and played an active role in establishing the Institut d'Action française. She was named secretary of the Dames royalistes (Royalist Ladies' Committee). Her dedication served as an inspiration for “her son Xavier and her two sons-in-law, Jean Rivain and Pierre Gilbert, who were among the leading militants of Action Française."

== Works ==
- 1896: Mademoiselle Edmonde
- 1897: Les Petits de Presle
- 1897: La Vieille
- 1898: Amitiés d’enfants
- 1898: Marmiton
- 1899: En fuite
- 1900: Histoires bretonnes ; Le Petit Ami des pauvres ; La Veuve Corr
