= Marsan, Azerbaijan =

Marsan
- Municipality
- Location within Azerbaijan Location within Shaki-Zagatala Economic Region
- Coordinates: 41°25′45″N 46°45′21″E
- Country: Azerbaijan
- Rayon: Qakh

Population
  - Total: 775
- Time zone: UTC+4 (AZT)
  - Summer (DST): UTC+5 (AZT)

Marsan is a village and municipality in the Qakh Rayon of Azerbaijan. It has a population of 775.
