= Jacques Prévotat =

French historian, professor and author (born 1939)

- Born: 1939 (age 86–87)
- Education: Paris Nanterre University
- Occupations: Historian, author

Jacques Prévotat (born 1939) is a French historian, professor and author specializing in contemporary history. He particularly studies the relationship between Catholicism and politics in modern France, contributing significantly to studying the Catholic movements, the Vatican, and political conflicts involving the Church.

== Biography ==
Jacques Prévotat earned a doctorate in history in 1994. He was a professor of contemporary history at the University of Lille III and specializes in the Action Française movement, particularly its relationship with the Catholic Church. He contributed to a summary of Pope Pius XI's condemnation of Action Française, concluding with the following remark:

"One cannot deny that the warning issued by Pius XI to the Catholics of Action française was above all a lucid reminder to the Christian conscience of the inalienable freedom of Catholics in the face of any autocratic abuse of state power."

Prévotat's work also explores the history of Catholic intellectuals in France, such as Henri de Lubac. He served as president of the French Association of Contemporary Religious History from 1996 to 1999 and is the current president of the Society of Friends of Henri-Irénée Marrou, which was founded in 2007. He has worked on topics relating to the relationship between the Catholic Church and totalitarian regimes, and religious resistance during World War II.

He was the scientific director of a conference held in December 2008 at the Instituto Sturzo in Rome, where the first results of the research programme were presented. He highlights in his work, Pie xi et la France, the importance of the Vatican archives' opening in 2006, which he believed helped provide an understanding of Vatican and Catholicism during the interwar period. Prévotat's involvement in this activity aligned him with historians in the study of the Catholic Church and its role in modern society.

== Publications ==
- Henri de Lubac and the Mystery of the Church, Cerf (contribution).
- Intellectual Christians and the Spirit of the 1920s, Cerf (contribution).
- Jean-Augustin Maydieu (1900–1955), Cerf (contribution).
- Catholics and Action française: History of a Condemnation, 1899–1939, foreword by René Rémond, Paris, Fayard, 2001, 742 pages.
- Being Christian in France in the 20th Century, from 1914 to the present, Seuil, 1998.
- Political Cultures in France, Seuil, 1999 (contribution).
- Action française, Paris: Presses Universitaires de France, 2004.
- Leymarie, Michel; Prévotat, Jacques, eds. (2008). L'Action française: culture, société, politique. Vol. 1. Villeneuve-d'Ascq: Presses universitaires du Septentrion. ISBN 978-2-7574-2123-9.
- Pie XI et la France: l’apport des archives du pontificat de Pie XI à la connaissance des rapports entre le Saint-Siège et la France. Rome: Publications de l’École française de Rome, 2012.

== Articles ==
- "Le Correspondant and the Review Action française, 1905–1908: A Dossier of Controversy". Études maurrassiennes. 4. Aix-en-Provence: 206–222. 1980.
- "The Reactions of the French Episcopate to the Condemnation of Action française (1926–1927) as Seen Through Semaines religieuses". Études maurrassiennes. 5 (1). Aix-en-Provence: 373–395. 1986.
