= Antoine Blanc de Saint-Bonnet =

French philosopher (1815–1880)

Blanc de Saint-Bonnet
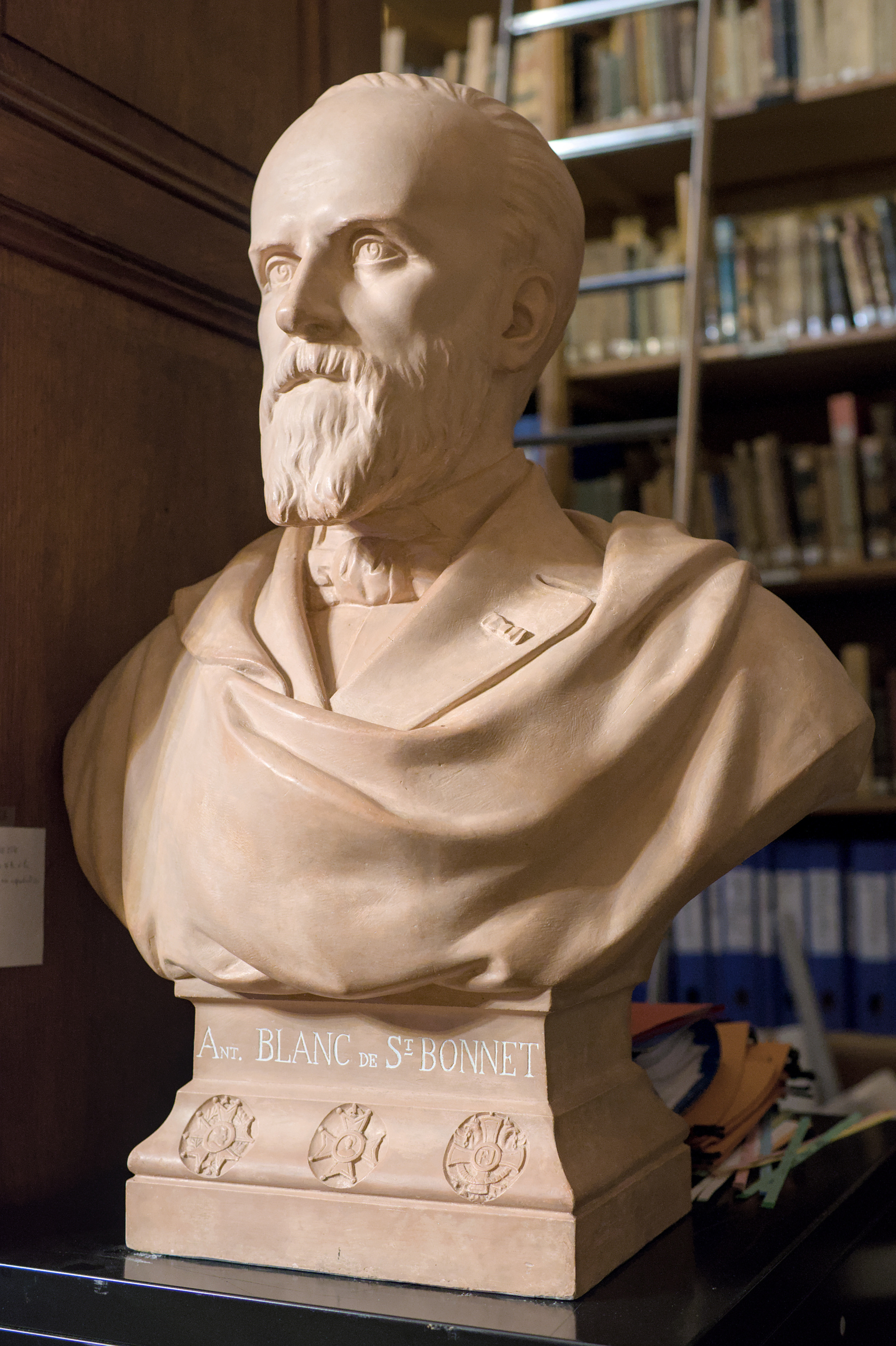
- Bust of Blanc de Saint-Bonnet
- Born: Antoine-Joseph-Elisée-Adolphe Blanc de Saint-Bonnet; 28 January 1815; Lyon, Kingdom of France
- Died: 8 June 1880 (aged 65); Lyon, Third French Republic

Philosophical work
- School: Royalism, Ultramontanism

Antoine Blanc de Saint-Bonnet (French: [ɑ̃twan blɑ̃ də sɛ̃ bɔnɛ]; 28 January 1815 – 2 June 1880) was a French philosopher whose ideas were a precursor to modern sociology.

== Works ==
- L'Unité Spirituelle (1841; Pitois, 3 vol., 1845).
- De la Douleur (1849; Club du Livre Rare, 1961; Les Editions de La Reconquête, 2012: with a review by Barbey d'Aurevilly and a letter by Léon Bloy).
- La Restauration Française (1851; Laroche, 1872).
- L'Affaiblissement de la Raison (1853).
- Politique Réelle (1858; Editions du Trident, 1990).
- L'Infaillibilité (1861; Nouvelles Éditions Latines, 1956).
- La Raison. Philosophie Fondamentale (1866).
- La Légitimité (1873).
- La Loi Électorale et les Deux Chambres (1875).
- Le XVIIIe Siècle (1878).
- Le Socialisme et la Société (1880; Presses Académiques, 1954).
- L'Amour et la Chute (1898).
