= Jacques Bainville =

French historian and journalist

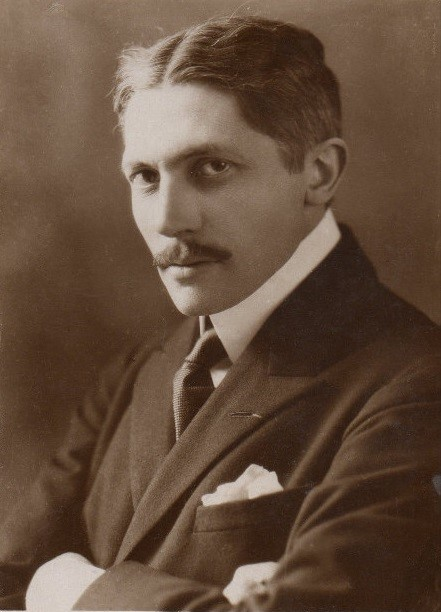
- Born: 9 February 1879; Vincennes, Val-de-Marne, France
- Died: 9 February 1936 (aged 57); Paris, France
- Occupations: historian, journalist
- Political party: Action Française

Jacques Pierre Bainville ([ʒak bɛ̃.vil]; 9 February 1879 – 9 February 1936) was a French historian and journalist. A geopolitical theorist, concerned by Franco-German relations, he was a leading figure in the monarchist Action française. As fascinated as he was worried by Germany which continuously grew stronger, he intensely advocated against democracy, the French Revolution, internationalism and liberalism. A plaza is named after him at the heart of the 7th arrondissement of Paris.

== Political career ==
Bainville is best known for his criticisms of the Treaty of Versailles in Les Conséquences Politiques de la Paix (The Political Consequences of Peace, 1920). Raymond Aron retrospectively endorsed Bainville's judgment that the "Versailles Treaty was too harsh in its mild features, too mild in its harsh aspects": provoking Germany to seek vengeance without restraining it from doing so, and won the praise of the Left Wing National Socialist Otto Strasser. Bainville argued that the treaty's debts bound German states closer to Prussia and weakened neighbors to the South and East (principally Austria-Hungary) that might be willing and able to contain it. By consolidating Germany, he warned that the treaty established an untenable situation whereby "40 million Frenchmen have as debtors 60 million Germans, whose debt cannot be liquidated for 30 years". He castigated Woodrow Wilson and David Lloyd George for what he perceived as naïve moralism that dangerously neglected geopolitical imperatives. Intended as a complement to John Maynard Keynes' critique of the treaty, it was eventually translated into German in Nazi Germany by some, alleging that France had a mission for German destruction.

His other written works included Histoire de France as well as political columns for a number of newspapers and editing La Revue Universelle for Maurras. His Histoire de deux peuples (1915) underlined the importance for France of German weakness and sought a return to the pre-Franco-Prussian War status of Germany. He repeatedly lauded the Treaty of Westphalia as the diplomatic arrangement best suited to securing peace in Europe. Preoccupied by the need to contain Germany, he was initially an admirer of Italian fascism and when early reports came through about violent acts by Benito Mussolini's fascio in 1921, he praised them as proof that Italy was regaining her strength.

A follower of Charles Maurras, Bainville was a founder of Action française and soon became an important figure in the Institut d'Action française, a college of sorts run by the organisation (it had no permanent buildings, but it ran lectures and study groups where possible). Edward R. Tannenbaum states that by 1900 Bainville had formed his major hatreds: hatred of disorder, of romanticism, liberalism, democracy, internationalism, the French Revolution, and especially hatred of Germany. Bainville first came to prominence as an activist against Alfred Dreyfus. He believed in anti-Semitic conspiracies, but was sceptical of the integrity of The Protocols of the Elders of Zion despite also defending them. He was once quoted as saying, "even if they're not true, they might as well be."

Bainville was appointed to a chair at the Académie française in 1935, although he did not hold the position long; his health was already poor, and he died soon afterwards. A strong Catholic, he was denied the last rites by Cardinal Jean Verdier, as the Pope had condemned Action française in 1926. Nonetheless, the sacraments, as well as his Requiem Mass, were offered by a canon who was sympathetic to the movement. Bainville's funeral proved a further source of controversy when socialist Prime Minister Léon Blum was set upon and nearly lynched by a crowd of mourners during the procession.

== Works ==
- Louis II de Bavière (1900).
- Bismarck et la France (1907).
- Le Coup d'Agadir et la Guerre d'Orient (1913).
- Histoire de Deux Peuples (1915).
- La Guerre et l'Italie (1916).
- Petit Musée Germanique (1917).
- Comment est née la Révolution Russe (1917).
- Histoire de Trois Générations (1918).
- Comment Placer sa Fortune (1919).
- Les Conséquences Politiques de la Paix (1920).
- Ironie et Poésie (1923).
- Filiations (1923).
- Heur et Malheur des Français (1924).
- Histoire de France (1924).
- Le Dix-huit Brumaire (1925).
- Le Salon d'Aliénor (1926).
- Nouveau Dialogue dans le Salon d'Aliénor (1926).
- Polioute (1926).
- L'Allemagne Romantique et Réaliste (1927).
- Le Critique Mort Jeune (1927).
- Au Seuil du Siècle (1927).
- Jaco et Lori (1927).
- Le Vieil Utopiste (1927).
- Petite Histoire de France (1928).
- Couleurs du Temps (1928).
- La Tasse de Saxe (1928).
- Le Jardin des Lettres (1928).
- Une Saison chez Thespis (1928).
- Napoléon (1931).
- Maximes et Réflexions (1931).
- Les Sept Portes de Thèbes (1931).
- Bismarck (1932).
- Louis II de Bavière (1932).
- Les Étonnements de Michou (1934).
- La Troisième République (1935).
- Les Dictateurs (1935).

Posthumous

- Bonaparte en Égypte (1936).
- Lectures (1937).
- La Fortune de la France (1937).
- La Russie et la Barrière de l'Est (1937).
- L'Angleterre et l'Empire Britannique (1938).
- Chroniques (1938).
- Doit-on le Dire? (1939).
- L'Allemagne (1939–1940).
- Comment s'est Faite la Restauration de 1814 (1943).
- Esquisses et Portraits (1946).
- La France (1947).
- Journal: 1901-1918 (1948).
- Journal: 1919-1926 (1949).
- Journal: 1927-1935 (1949).
- Journal Inédit (1953).

Miscellany

- Preface to Mirabeau ou la Révolution Royale, by Herbert Van Leisen (1926).
- Preface to Jomini ou le Devin de Napoléon, by Xavier de Courville (1935).

In English translation

- Italy and the War (1916).
- Two Histories Face to Face, France versus Germany (1919).
- History of France (1926).
- Napoleon (1931).
- The French Republic, 1870-1935 (1936).
- Dictators (1937).
