= Léon de Montesquiou =

French essayist

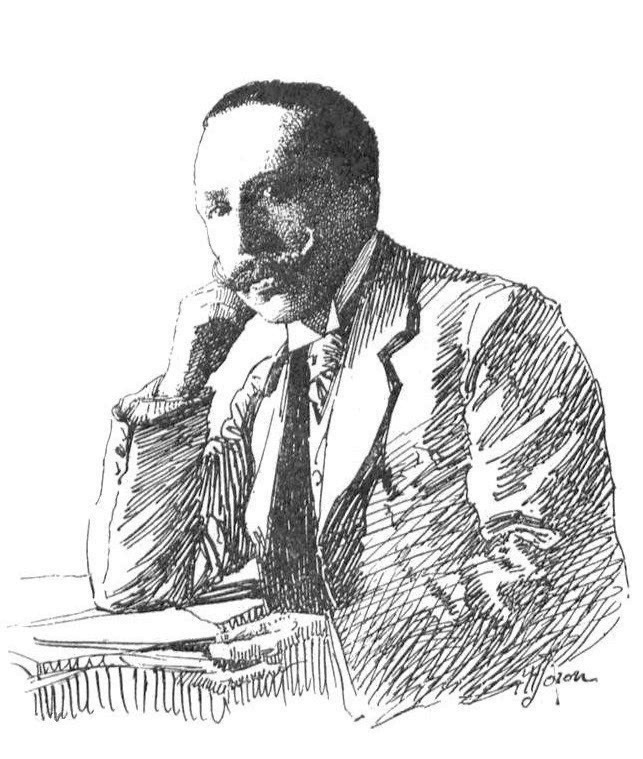
- Léon de Montesquiou by Maurice Joron
- Born: Léon Odon Marie Anatole de Montesquiou-Fezensac; 14 July 1873; Briis-sous-Forges
- Died: 25 September 1915 (aged 42); Souain
- Occupation: Essayist

Léon de Montesquiou (French pronunciation: [leɔ̃ də mɔ̃tɛskju]; 14 July 1873 – 25 September 1915) was an artistocratic French essayist, militant royalist and nationalist. He played a leading role in the right-wing Action Française movement before World War I (1914–18). He enrolled in the army during the war and was killed in action.

== Early years (1873–1901) ==
Léon Odon Marie Anatole de Montesquiou-Fezensac was born on 14 July 1873 in Briis-sous-Forges, Seine-et-Oise. His father was an officer and had married a francophile woman of the high Romanian nobility, Princess Marie Bibesco, whose father he had known during the campaigns of the Empire. He was raised in the family chateau of Courtanvaux until the age of ten, then was sent to the Stanislas Catholic school in Paris. After graduating he entered the École de Droit, and at the same time studied violin at the Conservatoire.

Montesquiou performed his military service as a private soldier from 13 November 1894 to 24 September 1895 in the 115th Infantry Regiment, and was in one of the units designated to witness the degradation of Captain Alfred Dreyfus. He exercised with the 103rd Infantry Regiment in 1897, 1901, 1903 and 1905. He was always rated very well, and advanced steadily in rank, becoming a sub-lieutenant of the reserve in 1900. He obtained his bachelor's degree and then in 1899 wrote his doctoral thesis on the suppression of duelling. He enrolled at the bar but never pleaded.

On 20 June 1899 Montesquiou attended the first public meeting organized by the committee of the Action Française at the Salle des Agriculteurs, and publicly support the organization that evening. From then on he was in constant correspondence with Maurras, to whom the adherence of the well-born young man was important. In 1900 he joined the Ligue de la patrie française, but then moved over to the Action française due to his exchanges with Maurras. His only reservation about the movement was that France was still proudly Republican, far from monarchist. He contributed to the revue grise from 1900, writing firmly nationalistic articles that were later collected into books such as Le Salut public (1901) and La Raison d'État (1902).

== Action Française (1901–15) ==
Montesquiou was definitely converted to the royalist cause in August 1901. He was one of the few members of the old aristocracy to play a leading role in the Action Française movement. He became an increasingly important member of the movement. In September 1902 he was put in charge of the notes de quinzaine in the Action française review. By the end of December 1902 was chairman of the board of Action française review, which had just been incorporated as a public limited company. He then organized a successful conference in Marseille followed by a series of conferences in the provinces from 1903 onward. He became one of the best and most active speakers of the movement. In January 1905 he became Secretary General of the new Ligue d'Action française.

Montesquiou was among the many early members of the Action Française who were practicing Catholics, and included the art historian Louis Dimier and the essayist Bernard de Vésins. They helped Charles Maurras (1868–1952) develop the royalist league's pro-Catholic policies. In February 1906 Montesquiou launched the Institut d'Action Française, where he held the "Auguste Comte" chair. He wrote three books on Comte and positivism based on his lectures and conferences. In his Le système politique d'Auguste Comte à la Nouvelle librairie nationale (1907) Montesquiou tried to show the disciples of Comte could get along with Catholics. In 1910 he was elected a member of the Comtistes. (Note: Other Comtistes who were members or associated with AF were Antoine Baumann, Jules Raty, Paul Ritti, Georges Deherme and Julien Peyrouix.)

The decision of the Court of Cassation on 12 July 1906 to annul the conviction of Captain Dreyfus caused a renewed surge of anti-Drefusism among the Action française, with Montesquiou playing a leading role. The League denounced the decision, and violently attacked General Georges Picquart, the new Minister of War. In April 1907 Montesquiou was officially informed by the Ministry of War that a report on his activity in the Action française had been filed in his dossier as an officer. On 26 April 1907 Le Gaulois published his open letter to Prime Minister Georges Clemenceau in which he responded to the report by saying he would again put up posters against the rehabilitation of Dreyfus and Picquart. On 16 May 1907 he was suspended from his duties as a reserve officer for one year. Montesquiou held a meeting of 5,000 supporters two days later. Following an inquiry he was dismissed from his rank and employment in the army on 3 September 1907. He continued to campaign against the Drefusards.

Montesquiou wrote that the Action Francaise was born from the Dreyfus Affair. In July 1909 he wrote, "We have one goal: Order through the restoration of the King. Well, if this restoration necessitates opposition to the law, violence, and coup de force, we are ready."

During World War I (1914–18) Montesquiou was assigned as lieutenant to the 2nd Foreign Infantry Regiment. He fought in eastern France and in Champagne. He died at Souain, Marne, on 25 September 1915 when leading his section in an assault. He was decorated with the Croix de Guerre. Montesquiou became part of the pantheon of martyrs of the Action Française. Jean Baffier was commissioned in 1916 to produce a bust of Montesquiou for the editorial offices of the Action Française. However, his preliminary model was rejected, and the sculptor was forced to consider a suit for breach of contract.

== Publications ==
- Léon de Montesquiou (1899), Faculté de droit de Paris. Étude sur la suppression du duel (doctoral thesis), Paris: impr. de Jouve et Boyer / Université de Paris. Faculté de droit et des sciences économiques, p. 180
- Léon de Montesquiou (1901), "Le Salut public", l'Action française, Paris: Plon-Nourrit et Cie: 216
- Léon de Montesquiou (1902), La Raison d'Etat, Paris: Plon-Nourrit et Cie, p. 199
- Léon de Montesquiou (1904), Nos Traditions nationales, comment les défendre ?, Bourges: impr. de Tardy-Pigelet, p. 78
- Léon de Montesquiou (1905), De l'anarchie à la monarchie, Paris: l'Action française, p. 56
- Léon de Montesquiou (1905), Les Raisons du nationalisme, Paris: Plon-Nourrit et Cie, p. 269
- Léon de Montesquiou (1907), Ma révocation..., Paris: Éditions de "l'Action française", p. 44
- Léon de Montesquiou (1907), Le Système politique d'Auguste Comte, Paris: Nouvelle librairie nationale / Institut d'action française, p. 347
- Léon de Montesquiou (1908), Les Consécrations positivistes de la vie humaine, Paris: Nouvelle librairie nationale / Institut d'action française, p. 251
- Léon de Montesquiou (1910), L'Antipatriotisme et la République, les manuels scolaires (Conférence in Lille, 5 March 1910), Paris: bureaux de "l'Action française"
- Léon de Montesquiou (1911), Auguste Comte, quelques principes de conservation sociale, Paris: l'"Action française", p. 84
- Léon de Montesquiou (1911), Le réalisme de Bonald, Paris: Nouvelle librairie nationale / Institut d'Action française
- Léon de Montesquiou; Lucien Moreau (1911), La Politique de "l'Action française". Réponse à MM. Lugan et J. Pierre..., Paris: l'Action française, p. 131
- Léon de Montesquiou (1912), Le "Contrat social" de J.-J. Rousseau ou les Fondements philosophiques de la démocratie, Paris: l'Action française, p. 27
- Léon de Montesquiou (1912), L'Oeuvre de Frédéric Le Play, Paris: Nouvelle librairie nationale / Institut d'action française, p. 282
- Léon de Montesquiou (1913), Les Débats sur l'armée, Paris: l'Action française, p. 51
- Léon de Montesquiou (1914), Notes sur la Roumanie : un pays sauvé par la monarchie, un roi et une constitution, la question juive..., Paris: Nouvelle librairie nationale, p. 106
- Léon de Montesquiou (1914), 1870 les causes politiques du désastre, Paris: Nouvelle Librairie nationale, p. 286
- Léon de Montesquiou (1918), Les origines et la doctrine de l'"Action française", Paris: Ligue "d'Action française", p. 40
- Léon de Montesquiou (1919), La Noblesse. Suivi d'extraits de Blanc de Saint-Bonnet sur le même sujet..., Paris: Service des publications de "l'Action française", p. 32

== Sources ==
- Arnal, Oscar L. (1985-04-15), Ambivalent Alliance: The Catholic Church and the Action Française, 1899–1939, University of Pittsburgh Pre, ISBN 978-0-8229-7705-6
- Laurent, Sébastien (2008-01-28), "Léon de Montesquiou (1873–1915)", Lettres à Charles Maurras: Amitiés politiques, lettres autographes, 1898-1952 (in French), Presses Univ. Septentrion, ISBN 978-2-7574-0044-9
- "Léon de Montesquiou", Maurras actuel - Actualité de Charles Maurras (in French), 1 July 2017
- McWilliam, Neil (2000), Monumental Intolerance: Jean Baffier, a Nationalist Sculptor in Fin-de-Siècle France, Penn State Press, ISBN 0-271-04394-6
- Osgood, Samuel M. (2012-12-06), French Royalism under the Third and Fourth Republics, Springer Science & Business Media, ISBN 978-94-015-0645-8
- Simon, W. M. (Spring 1965), "Comte's Orthodox Disciples: The Rise and Fall of a Cenacle", French Historical Studies, 4 (1), Duke University Press, doi:10.2307/285874, JSTOR 285874
- Wilson, Stephen (1969), "The 'Action Francaise' in French Intellectual Life", The Historical Journal, 12 (2), Cambridge University Press, JSTOR 2637807
