= Jean Rivain =

French political writer and journal editor

- Born: 14 November 1883; Paris, France
- Died: 23 May 1957 (aged 73); Auverse, Maine-et-Loire, France
- Occupation(s): Editor, political writer

Jean Rivain (November 14, 1883 – May 23, 1957) was a French political writer and journal editor. He was the co-founder of La Revue critique des idées et des livres.

== Early life ==
Jean Rivain was born on 14 November 1883 in Paris, France.

== Career ==
Rivain was a political writer and editor. He was the author of several books on French politics, where he championed nationalism and rejected socialism. He published a collection of letters addressed to Marshal Philippe Pétain in 1944.

Rivain was influenced by ideas of Charles Maurras and by Italian fascism. He even moved to Italy with his son to experience fascism, and called for closer relations between France and Italy. Meanwhile, he was the founder of the Cercle Joseph de Maistre, a think tank which promoted the ideas of French philosopher Joseph de Maistre. Furthermore, he argued that Georges Sorel's ideas on corporations and cooperatives were elitist.

Rivain was the co-founder of La Revue critique des idées et des livres, a journal associated with the Action Française, in 1908. From 1908 Lucien Moreau and Jean Rivain were the key contributors to the review.

== Death ==
Rivain died on 23 May 1957 in Auverse, Maine-et-Loire, France.

== Works ==
- Rivain, Jean (1910). De la Souveraineté et de la représentation des intérêts. Paris: Nouvelle librairie nationale. OCLC 457990037.
- Rivain, Jean (1910). Politique, morale, religion. Paris: Nouvelle librairie nationale. OCLC 6220355.
- Rivain, Jean (1911). Les Socialistes anti-démocrates. L'avenir du syndicalisme; la patrie des prolétaires; à propos des retraites ouvrières. Paris: Nouvelle librairie nationale. OCLC 457990029.
- Rivain, Jean (1921). De l'Interprétation des classiques au théâtre. OCLC 469004146.
- Rivain, Jean (1926). Un programme de restauration sociale : La Tour du Pin précurseur, suivi de quelques essais d'un autre âge en marge de l'ordre français. Paris: Société d'édition Le Livre. OCLC 6256498.
- Rivain, Jean (1928). Le choc des armes : première série de lettres à Mussolini. Paris: Les Cahiers d'Occident. OCLC 4207261.
- Rivain, Jean (1930). Le Message de Virgile. OCLC 468908742.
- Rivain, Jean (1936). Refaire l'unité française. Paris: Nouvelles Éditions latines. OCLC 9071943.
- Rivain, Jean (1944). Lettres au Maréchal. Paris: Éditions Alsatia. OCLC 496372887.
- Rivain, Jean (1945). De la matière à l'esprit. Paris: Librairie philosophique J. Vrin. OCLC 5691969.

== Sources ==
- Ferri, Laurent (2008-02-05), "Lucien Moreau (1872–1935)", Jewish Identities: Nationalism, Racism, and Utopianism in Twentieth-Century Music (in French), University of California Press, ISBN 978-0-520-25088-8
