= Lucien Moreau =

French journalist

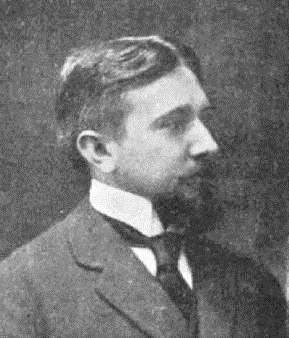
- Moreau in 1922
- Born: 16 January 1875
- Died: 6 April 1932 (aged 57)
- Occupation: Journalist

Lucien Moreau (January 16, 1875 – April 6, 1932) was a French journalist, monarchist and member of the Action Française.

== Family ==
Lucien Moreau was born in 1875, son of Émile Moreau (1841–1919). He was the grand-nephew of Augustin Boyer, brother-in-law and partner of Pierre Larousse, the creator of the Grand dictionnaire universel du XIXe siècle. At the end of the 19th century his father Émile, uncles Auguste and Georges and their cousin Cition owned a third of the thriving Éditions Larousse publishing house. Lucien Moreau was raised in a progressive environment, was not baptised, and as an adolescent was attracted to libertarian anarchism. Around 1900 he said he was "not a Christian at all". Moreau was the best friend of the Jewish playwright Edmond Fleg (1874–1963). They agreed that Jewish and French nationalisms "traveled in parallel lines", and rejected assimilation. From 1909 Lucien Moreau was in charge of the printing press of Larousse.

== Action Française ==
Moreau was a personal friend of Charles Maurras, whom he met in 1892 when Moreau was editorial secretary of the Revue encyclopédique Larousse and Maurras was a literary critic. Moreau was definitely converted to royalism by 1903. He became a regular contributor to the journal L'Action Française. The political organization of Henri Vaugeois's Action Française movement, the Ligue d'Action Française, was launched in the spring of 1905, as was the Action Française Federation of Students, directed by Lucien Moreau. Members pledged to fight the republican regime and to support restoration of the monarchy under Prince Philippe, Duke of Orléans (1869–1926). From 1906 Moreau was president of the Étudiants d'Action française.

Moreau was not particularly interested in creating a coup d'etat, but was mainly interested in organization and teaching doctrine. He originated the concept of the Institut d'Action française, which arranged conferences and trained party cadres. In 1906 Moreau was given a tenured chair at the Institut d'Action Française. As professor of French nationalist he expounded the policy of the Action Française to doubters. On 16 November 1908 Moreau and Maurice Pujo created the Camelots du Roi youth movement. From 1908 Moreau and Jean Rivain were the pillars of the La Revue critique des idées et des livres.

In 1920 Moreau initiated the expansion of the Institut d'Action Française into the provinces. From 1927 to 1932 he was director of the Société de librairie, d'enseignement et de publicité of the Action française. Lucien Moreau died in 1932.

== Publications ==
- Lucien Moreau; Léon de Montesquiou (1911), La Politique de "l'Action française". Réponse à MM. Lugan et J. Pierre..., Paris: L'Action française
- Many articles in the Revue d'Action française, L'Action française and Almanach d'Action française

== Sources ==
- Ferri, Laurent (2008-02-05), "Lucien Moreau (1872–1935)", Jewish Identities: Nationalism, Racism, and Utopianism in Twentieth-Century Music (in French), University of California Press, ISBN 978-0-520-25088-8
- Joly, Laurent (July 2006), "Les débuts de l'Action française (1899–1914) ou l'élaboration d'un nationalisme antisémite", Revue Historique (in French), 308 (3 (639), RELIGION ET SOCIÉTÉ), Presses Universitaires de France: 695–718, doi:10.3917/rhis.063.0695, JSTOR 40957800
- Mollier, Jean-Yves; Dubot, Bruno (2012-03-14), Histoire de la librairie Larousse, Fayard, ISBN 978-2-213-66963-2
- Moricz, Klara (2008-02-05), Jewish Identities: Nationalism, Racism, and Utopianism in Twentieth-Century Music, University of California Press, ISBN 978-0-520-25088-8
