= Gonzague Truc =

French writer and literary critic (1877–1972)

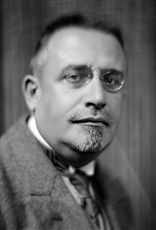

Gonzague Truc (15 November 1877 – 1 June 1972) was a French literary critic, essayist, and biographer.

Truc was born at Flayosc, Var. A frequent contributor to the Revue Philosophique, he was a Thomist who sympathised with Charles Maurras and the Action Française. He latterly lived in Paris.

== Works ==
- Le quartier St-Victor et le jardin des plantes, Paris, Éditions Firmin-Didot, 1930
- Le Roman de la violette de Gerbert de Montreuil, renouvelé par Gonzague Truc, Paris, éd. d'art H. Piazza, 1931
- Introduction à la lecture de René Boylesve, Paris, Le Divan, série-collection « Le Souvenir de René Boylesve », 1932
- Les pages immortelles de Spinoza (choisies et expliquées par Gonzague Truc), Paris, Éditions Corrêa, 1940
- Madame Colette, Paris, Éditions Corrêa, 1941
- Histoire de la Philosophie, Paris, Éditions Fischbacher, 1950
- Histoire de la Littérature Catholique Contemporaine, Casterman, 1961, Prix Broquette-Gonin (littérature)

== Sources ==
- Henry Coston, Dictionnaire de la politique française. Vol 2 (1972)
