= Louis de Loménie =

French scholar and essayist (1815–1878)

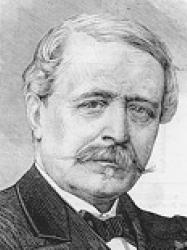
Louis de Loménie

Louis-Léonard de Loménie (3 December 1815 – 2 April 1878) was a French scholar and essayist. He is best known for his biography of Pierre-Augustin Caron de Beaumarchais, and also edited this author's complete works.

== Biography ==
Loménie was born at Saint-Yrieix-la-Perche, Haute-Vienne. He studied at Avignon and was professor of French literature at the Collège de France from 1862, then at the École Polytechnique from 1864, and editor of the Revue des Deux Mondes. His first literary work was a series of biographical sketches, published under the title Galerie des contemporains illustres par un homme de rien (1846–1847). He was elected to the Académie Française in 1871.

He died in Paris in 1878.

== Works ==
His chief work is Beaumarchais et son temps (1855), marked by much scholarly research. He also wrote La comtesse de Rochefort et ses amis (1871); Esquisses historiques et littéraires (1878); Les Mirabeau (1879).

- Galerie des contemporains illustres, par un homme de rien, 1840–1847, 10 volumes
- Leçons de littérature au Collège de France, 1845–1864
- Beaumarchais et son temps : études sur la société en France au XVIIIe siècle d'après des documents inédits, 1855, 2 volumes. Réédition Slatkine, Genève, 1970. Online text from Gallica.
- La Comtesse de Rochefort et ses amis : études sur les mœurs en France au XVIIIe, avec des documents inédits, 1870. Republished Slatkine, Genève, 1971.
- Les Mirabeau, nouvelles études sur la société française au XVIIIe siècle, 1879, 2 volumes, followed by a continuation by his son Charles de Loménie, 1889–1891, 3 volumes
- Esquisses historiques et littéraires, 1879
