= Eugène Marsan =

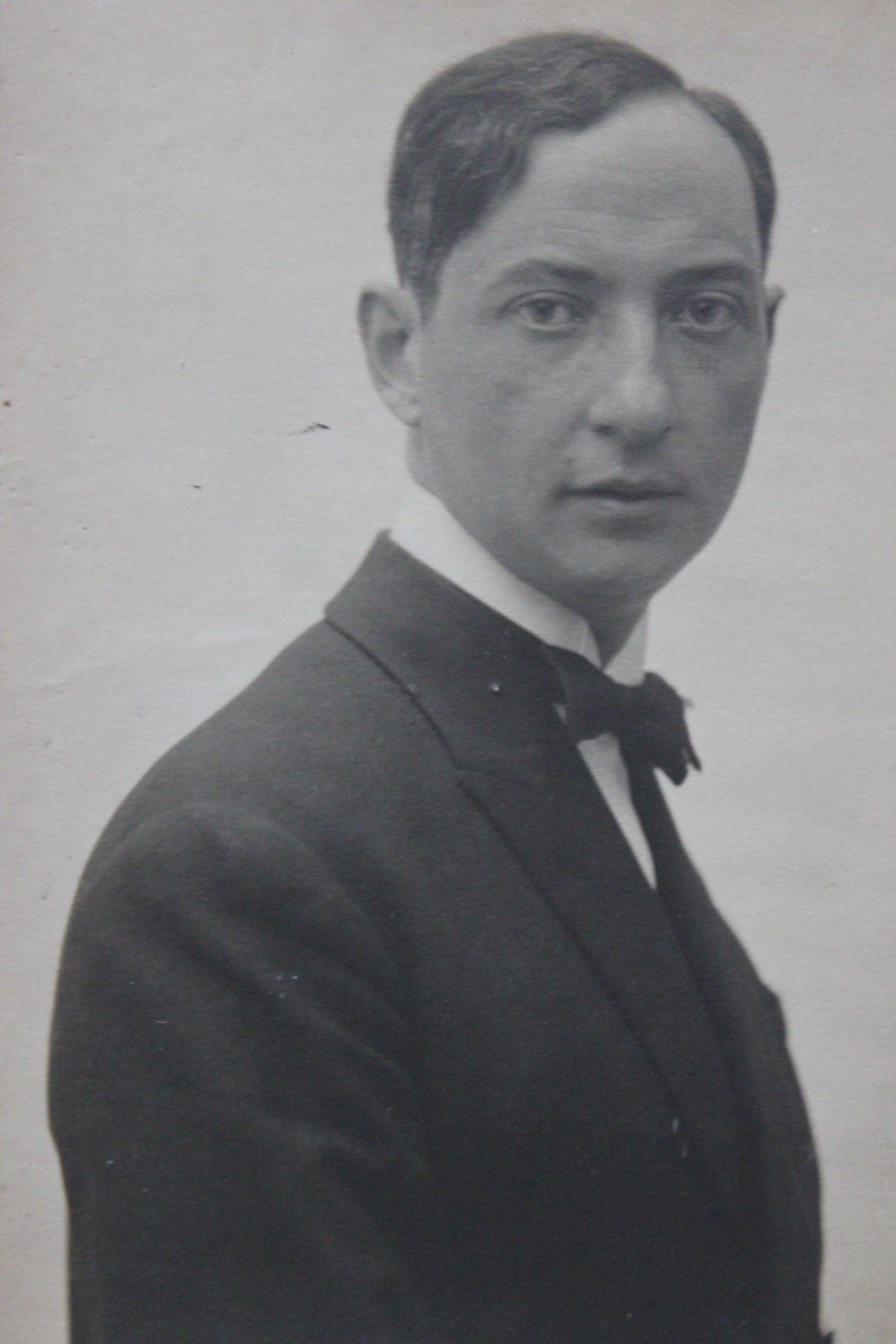
- Born: eugene marsan 1882; Bari, Apulia, Italy
- Died: 1936 (aged 53–54); Paris, France

Eugène Marsan (1882–1936) was a French author and literary critic. He won the Prix Vitet from the Académie française in 1936.

== Works ==
- Marsan, Eugène (1909). Les cannes de Paul Bourget. Paris: Édition du Divan. OCLC 763221822.
- Marsan, Eugène (1921). Amazones. Paris: Champion. OCLC 23873066.
- Marsan, Eugène (1923). Passantes. Paris: Le Divan. OCLC 18299360.
- Marsan, Eugène (1923). Chronique de la paix ou la vie quotidienne des Français après la guerre. Paris: Nouvelle revue française. OCLC 898768323.
- Marsan, Eugène (1924). Les femmes de Casanova. Paris: Au Pigeonnier. OCLC 9772575.
- Marsan, Eugène (1925). Le nouvel amour. Paris: F. Lefèvre. OCLC 19649805.
- Marsan, Eugène (1926). Les chambres du plaisir. Paris: Nouvelle revue française. OCLC 10058538.
- Marsan, Eugène (1926). Éloge de la paresse. Paris: Hachette. OCLC 43863328.
- Marsan, Eugène (1926). Savoir vivre en France et savoir s'habiller. Paris: Editions de France. OCLC 370691649.
- Marsan, Eugène (1930). Signes de notre temps. Paris: Librairie de France. OCLC 459311498.
- Marsan, Eugène (1935). Mussolini. Paris: Denoël et Steele. OCLC 715822126.
