= Louis Dimier =

French art historian

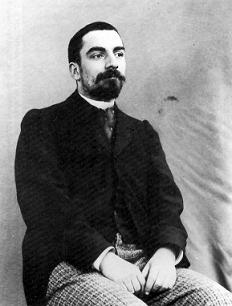
Louis Dimier

Louis Dimier (French pronunciation: [lwi dimje]; 11 February 1865 – 21 November 1943) was a French art historian and royalist.

Dimier was among the many early members of the Action Française who were practising Catholics (along with Bernard de Vésins and Léon de Montesquiou). They helped Charles Maurras (1868–1952) develop the royalist league's pro-Catholic policies.

In 1915, during the First World War, Dimier published Les troncons du serpent: idée d'une dislocation de l'empire allemnd at d'une reconstitution des Allemagnes in which he advocated partitioning Germany into around 100 free cities and allocating German lands to Poland and Sweden, with the Rhineland and the Ruhr being a workers' state entrusted to trade unions.

== Bibliography ==
- Serina, Elena (2020), Nuovi elementi sul rapporto fra Action Française e Santa Sede: il ruolo di Louis Dimier nella difesa di Maurras, «Rivista di Storia del Cristianesimo» (2), pp. 497–518.
