= Camille Mortenol =

French naval officer (1859–1930)

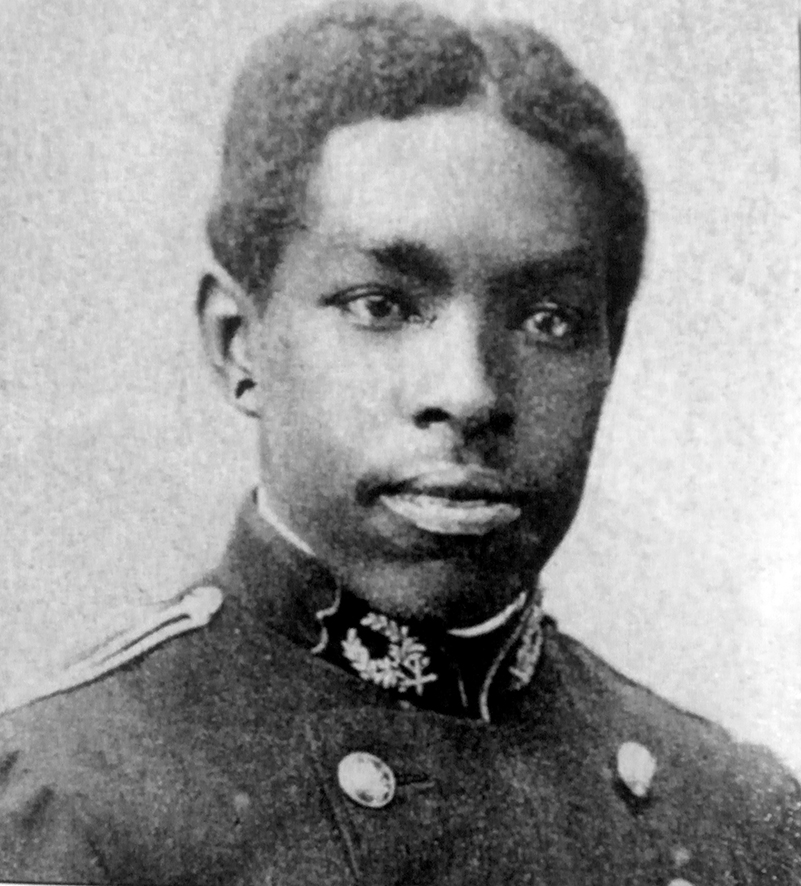
- Born: Sosthène Héliodore Camille Mortenol; November 29, 1859; Pointe-à-Pitre, Guadeloupe, Second French Empire
- Died: December 22, 1930 (aged 71); 15th arrondissement of Paris, France
- Burial place: Cimetière de Vaugirard
- Spouse: Marie-Louise Vitalo (m. 1902–1912)
- Military career
- Allegiance: (France) Third Republic
- Branch: Navy
- Service years: 1882–1919
- Rank: Capitaine de vaisseau (Navy) / Colonel d'artillerie (Army Reserve)
- Conflicts: Franco-Hova Wars, First World War

Sosthène Héliodore Camille Mortenol (French pronunciation: [kamij mɔʁt(ə)nɔl]; 29 November 1859 – 22 December 1930) was a senior officer in the French Navy under the Third Republic and graduate of the École polytechnique. He fought in several of France's colonial campaigns of the era and commanded Paris's anti-aircraft defences during the First World War.

== Life ==
=== Family origins ===
Mortenol was born on 29 November 1859 at a house at the junction of rue de Nozières and rue de l'Abbé Grégoire in Pointe-à-Pitre (the house survives and the town council placed a plaque on it on the centenary of his birth), a town still suffering the after-effects of the 1843 Guadeloupe earthquake. From a modest background, he was the third and last child of a man named André, born in Africa around 1809 and freed from slavery on 23 July 1847 aged 38. He bought his freedom for 2400 francs by a decree of the governor of Guadeloupe, André had then declared to the royal commissioner accepting his money "You captured me in the land of Africa to enslave me. Today give me my liberty!. On being freed André took the surname Mortenol and on 18 August 1855 married the seamstress Julienne Toussaint at Pointe-à-Pitre on 18 August 1855.

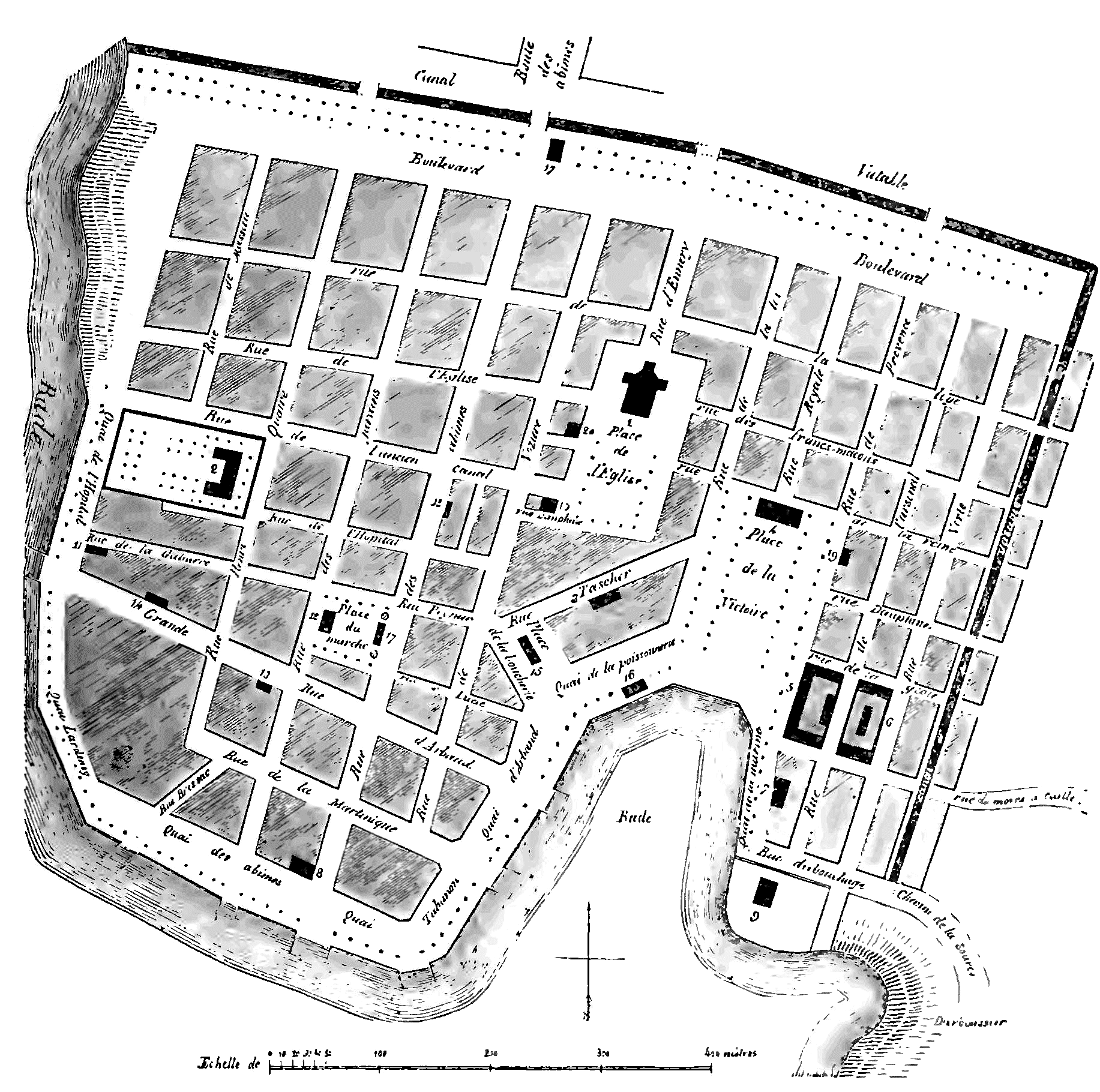
Map of Pointe-à-Pitre in 1843

At the time of Camille's birth, André was working as a sailmaker and later (according to some business documents) a master sailmaker. Camille's elder brother Eugène André was born in Pointe-à-Pitre on 7 June 1856, whilst his younger sister Marie Adèle was born on 27 June 1858, again in Pointe-à-Pitre. Pointe-à-Pitre's registers of births, marriages and deaths record a Sosthène Héliodore Camille Mortenol born to André Mortenol and Julienna Toussaint on 29 November 1859 and dying on 25 June 1885 a death also recorded in the Le Courrier de la Guadeloupe as "25 – Mortenol (Sosthène-Eléodore-Camille), aged 26 years, sailmaker". Did the declared death usurp the identity of someone who was actually still alive?

Oruno D. Lara's Mortenol, ou, Les infortunes de la servitude argues that the eldest son Eugène André was a brilliant scholar at the town school in Pointe-à-Pitre and so André's friends convinced him that Eugene André's educational success would be best served by enrolling him at the diocesan seminary-college in Basse-Terre under the less-gifted Camille's identity. Such a change of identity could have operated discretely, far from his relations and friends in Pointe-à-Pitre. Knocking these three years off his age nevertheless allowed Sosthène Héliodore Camille to have a secondary education up to baccalauréat level and then free higher studies without any suspicion of the fate they would offer him. (Note: The items in the Vincennes folder at the [Ndlr:Service Historique de la Marine] therefore seem to confirm the voluntary substitution (though it remains unknown who in the administration organised it) and lending the elder brother the younger brother's first names to gain bursaries, first names which the Histoire retains for him)

=== Education ===
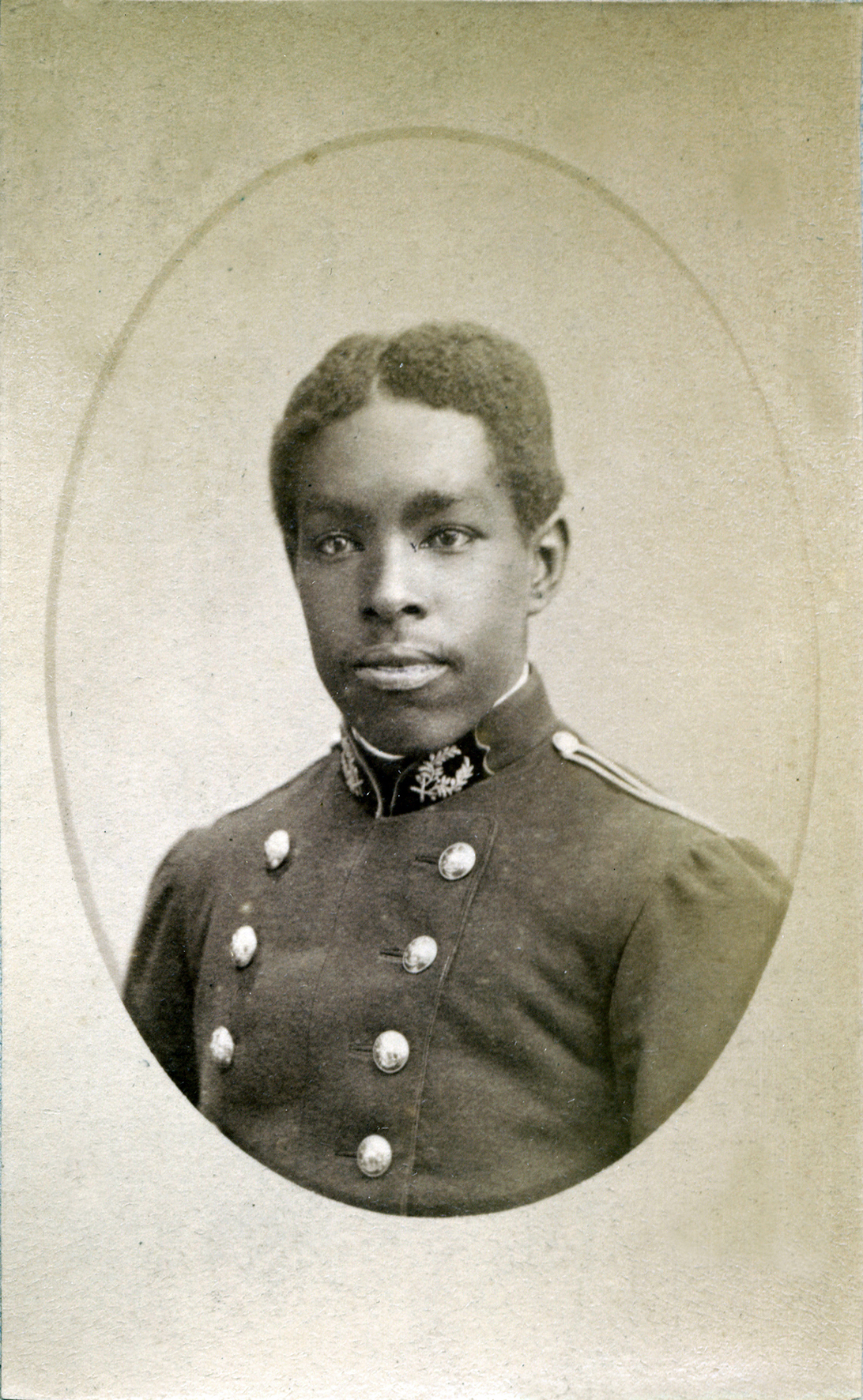
Camille Mortenol, student officer at the École polytechnique de Paris.

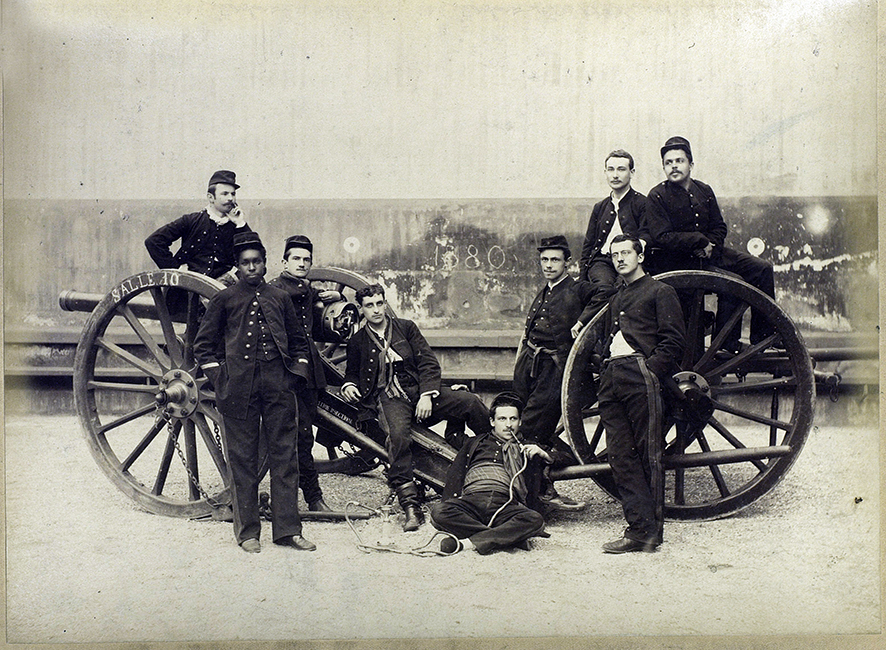
Camille Mortenol, student officer at the École polytechnique de Paris, 1880.

Sosthène Héliodore Camille Mortenol began his external studies under the Brothers of Christian Instruction's primary school on rue Schoelcher in Pointe-à-Pitre and then began at the diocesan seminary-college in Basse-Terre founded by Monsignor Pierre Lacarrière on 1 January 1852. His good results, notably in mathematics, brought him to the attention of Victor Schœlcher, who gave him help and support He also benefitted from a 50% government bursary (decreed on 30 November 1875), which completed the 50% local bursary and a paid-for voyage to France aboard Le Finistère for secondary education at the Lycée Montaigne in Bordeaux.

In 1877 Camille Mortenol obtained his baccalauréat ès sciences and then began preparing for the entrance examination to the École polytechnique; he came nineteenth out of 209 applicants. At the same time he was also offered a place at the École spéciale militaire de Saint-Cyr but preferred the Polytechnique, which he entered on 1 November 1880,

This made him the third black man, the first Guadeloupean and the first man both of whose parents were black to enter the Polytechnique – the two previous black students were Auguste-François Perrinon (joined 1832, the mixed race son of a freed slave) and the Creole Charles Wilkinson (joined 1849), both from Martinique. At the séance des cotes he was welcomed on these terms by the ans (the "anciens", the argot term for those in their second year), who created the cote nègre for the occasion:

Ah! It's you, the black man. It's good, "conscrard", carry on! I recognised you by your shiny face, with brilliant reflections, on which two white eyes stand out like the two "rostos" on a sapin in the darkness of the night. If you are black, we are white; to each his colour and who can say which is the better? Even if yours is worth less, you would be even more worthy of entering the top school in the world, as people call it. you can be assured of all the sympathies of your "ans". We rated you because the admission of a black man to the "X" has never been seen before; but we do not dream of turning to ridicule you; we only see in you a good comrade whose hand we are happy to shake.

Another famous anecdote states that Patrice de MacMahon, visiting the École in 1881, said to Mortenol "Is it you, the black man? Very good my friend. Carry on." (Note: ... These anecdotes were circulating secretly when Mac-Mahon, in 1881, inspected the École polytechnique. All the students were standing at "garde-à-vous". With his hands behind his back, Mac-Mahon marched slowly along the ranks, from time to time questioning a young student. He came level with Mortenol who was impossible to miss. He coughed two or three times, twirled his moustache, and approached him. "Is it you, the black man?" he said, "Very good my friend... Carry on!" A similar anecdote is also lent to the same marshal "Is it you, the black man? Carry on!" during a visit to Saint-Cyr, but the debate seems definitively closed, the marshal would never have said this phrase during a visit to Saint-Cyr. The École polytechnique archives hold no evidence of an inspection by marshal Mac Mahon who stopped being president of France on 30 January 1879 - it has to be asked why aged 72 he would be inspecting it with that title. On the other hand, the École did have two inspections in 1881, one on 12 July by Baron de Berckheim, president of the artillery committee and on 17 July by the superintendent general Vigo-Roussillon. The marshal would never have pronounced this sentence in the same way during a visit to the Polytechnique.)

His scholarly ability was remarkable – 30th on his graduation to the first division – and on his full graduation in 1882 he was eighteenth in a class of 205. Camille Mortenol chose a career as a naval officer (the first of four graduates of the Polytechnique to choose that corps) and he was admitted to the navy on 1 October 1882.

=== Naval officer ===
==== 1882–1890 ====
He boarded the armed second-class transport frigate Alceste at Brest to begin his naval apprenticeship. On 1 October 1882, whilst still aboard her, he was promoted to midshipman ("aspirant") first class. Just afterwards he took part in a training cruise along the African coast. At the end of this period, praised by his superior officers, (Note: On leaving the École, he took a training cruise along the African coast on the Alceste, the Jeanne of that era. With three comrades he chose the naval artillery, gaining the best reports : according to the admiral major general of the Navy at Brest, "Mortenol was shown highly superior to his comrades in all his reports") he transferred to the ironclad Amiral Duperré, on which he sailed across the Mediterranean Sea between November 1883 and May 1884.

The following month he was sent to Rochefort on the aviso Bisson, named after Hippolyte Magloire Bisson, which was sent on the first Madagascar expedition, his first campaign. He was promoted to ensign ("enseigne de vaisseau") on 1 October 1884. On 17 December 1885, the day after a peace treaty was signed, he could finally return to France, arriving there in March 1886 after two years at sea. He was next attached to the naval division of the Levant and served as second-in-command of the gunboat Capricorne in the Indian Ocean. He then moved back aboard the Alceste as her second in command from October 1887 to July 1889, though by then she was a hospital ship at Libreville. On 25 August 1889, whilst still aboard the Alceste, he was promoted to lieutenant ("lieutenant de vaisseau").

==== 1890–1900 ====
In winter 1890 he visited his family on Guadeloupe and spent a few weeks convalescing there. This was his last-ever visit to the island, although he retained links with it, writing several articles for local newspapers such as Les Nouvellistes and meeting fellow Guadeloupeans based in Paris. On his return to mainland France he took an apprenticeship on the Algésiras, then anchored at Toulon as a torpedo training school. He remained aboard her from August to December 1890 and graduated from her as a torpedo officer.

In March 1891 he was sent to the mobile defences of Cherbourg and put in command of the torpedo boat Dehorter, launched in 1910 and (after another launched in 1884) the second torpedo boat to be named after Pierre Charles Henri Dehorter (1867-1884). A year later, in April 1892, he was transferred to the reserve squadron for the western Mediterranean and the Levant as chief torpedo officer of the cruiser Amiral Cécille, but that was a very brief posting as in January 1894 he was made chief artillery officer of the coastguard ironclad Jemmapes.

The same year he was attached to the expeditionary course sent to conquer Madagascar. General Jacques Charles René Achille Duchesne was put in command and the naval division was led by captain Amédée Bienaimé. Mortenol took part in several land battles, including the capture of the Malagasy forts or rovas at Marovoay on 2 May 1895. and Maevatanana on 9 June the same year After the capture of Tananarive on 30 September 1895 by the French expeditionary force, Martenol was one of the officers for in Gallieni's entourage and on 19 August 1895 was rewarded for his bravery by being made a chevalier of the Légion d'honneur, presented in person by president Félix Faure. - the citation stated he had been in the navy for 16 years 10 months, of which 11 years 6 months had been spent at sea. He was also awarded the Madagascar commemorative medal.

In May 1896 he began two years aboard the cruiser Fabert as its second in command under its commander capitaine de frégate Pierre Georges Fernand Forestier. He therefore sailed near Madagascar again and Forestier wrote on 15 August 1896:

Mr Mortenol is an excellent officer, whose services I have already had the chance of appreciating. The only thing detrimental to him is his race, and I fear that it will be incompatible with high rank in the Navy, which his merit and his education could otherwise perhaps allow him to attain without it.

In May 1898, weakened by the malaria which plagued him throughout his career, he returned to mainland France aboard the packet boat Pei Ho.

After some time convalescing, he was attached to the mobile defences of Toulon and served in several buildings. He went back to sea in 1898, again aboard the Algésiras and at the torpedo school, then he was ordered to join the training-ship Couronne. In a note dated 25 July 1899 captain Jean Baptiste Pierre Jules Arden, commander of the mobile defences, wrote of Mortenol:

One cannot hide the fact that this officer's colour may be a source of a little trouble. There is a prejudice on this one which one cannot avoid reckoning with, and I had the opportunity of seeing the astonishment, exclamations and remarks of the populations of ports seeing a torpedo boat arrive commanded by a black officer.

==== 1900–1908 ====
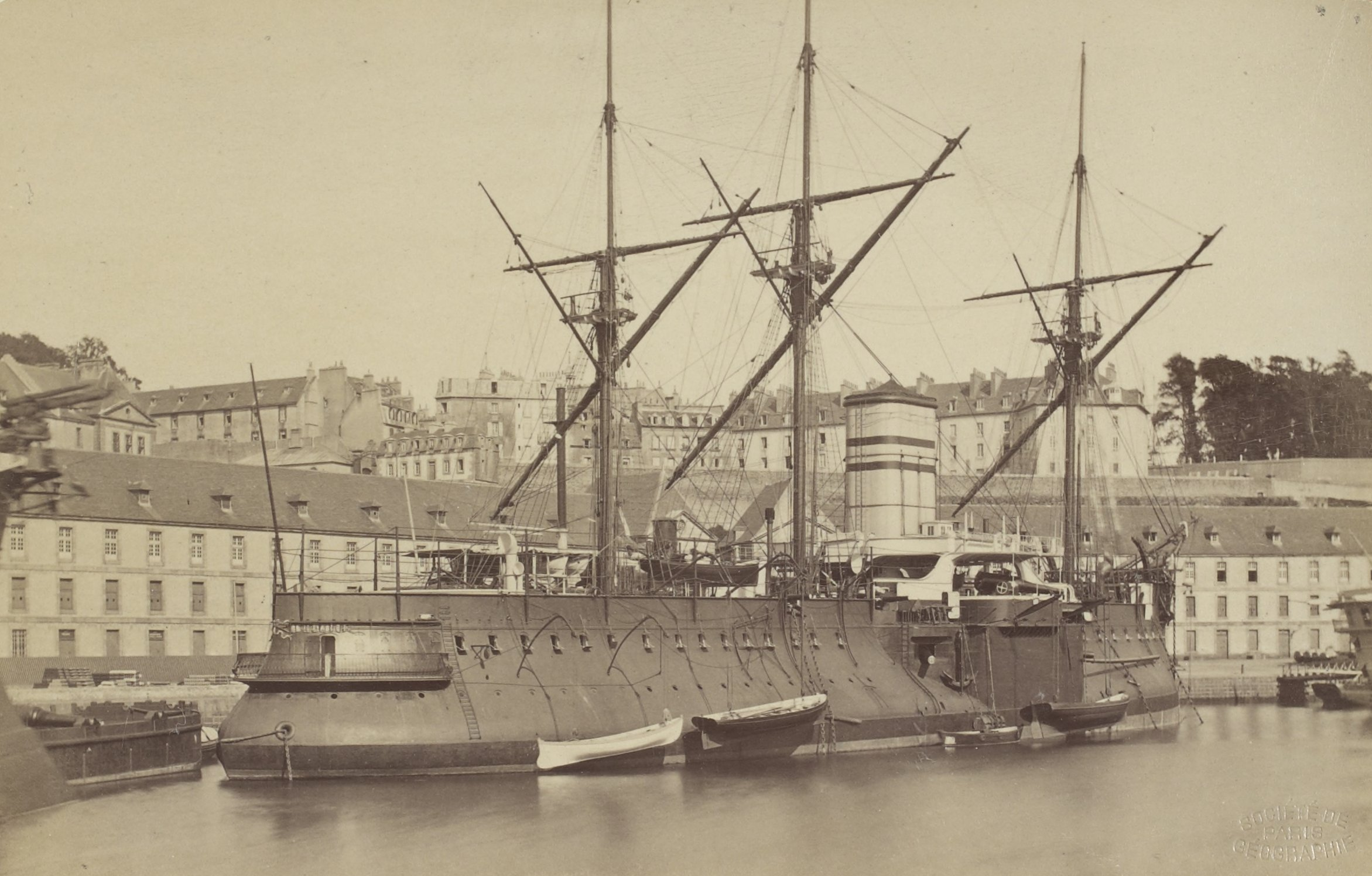
The Redoutable in Brest (James Jackson, 1882).

Mortenol was ordered to take command of a torpedo boat attached to Toulon's mobile defences on 14 February 1899 before taking command of a second-class group of torpedo boats within the reserve squadron on 1 March 1900, consisting of the Aventurier and the Argonaute. During summer 1900 he was sent back to Africa and on 19 July that year he was put in command of the Alcyon, a paddle-boat aviso stationed at Libreville For rescuing ships in difficulty during that command he was in 1909 awarded the Prussian Order of the Crown and thanks from Spain for rescuing ships in difficulty. He then travelled along the surrounding rivers and coasts, notably taking part in the repression of local uprisings (the Ogooué expedition).

In June 1902 he had to return to mainland France again to convalesce and on 9 September that year in the 14th arrondissement of Paris he married Marie-Louise Vitalo (17 May 1866, Cayenne - 28 July 1912, Brest), the widow of a mathematics teacher. - the couple had no children. Once that period of convalescence was complete he was sent to join the naval staff in Bresst in January 1903. Later in 1903 Mortenol made another request to be admitted to the École supérieure de Marine, which could earn him the rank of admiral. Brest's maritime prefect ranked him first out of the five candidates and gave a particularly complimentary reference, but the naval minister did not accept his application, perhaps due to his skin colour or due to the Affair of the Cards. He was at least promoted to "capitaine de frégate" on 7 April 1904 and was put in command of the armored cruiser Bruix.

At the end of the year Mortenol was ordered to join the cruiser Redoutable and found himself off Saigon as part of the reserve division of France's Far East Squadron. In 1907 he had to return to mainland France yet again to convalesce and on his return to duty he was posted to the naval division in the Indian Ocean, commanding the anti-torpedo-boat ship Pistolet and the 2nd Torpedo Boat Flotilla in the China Sea. In April 1908 he was also given command of the 1st Flotilla.

==== 1909–1913 ====
On 22 July 1909 he was given permission to return to mainland France to convalesce again and at the end of that year he was again posted to the naval staff at Brest. He then took command of Brest's fixed defences on 20 March 1911.

On 2 April 1911 he was awarded the Imperial Order of the Dragon of Annam and on 12 July the same year he was made an officier of the Légion d’honneur, followed by promotion "capitaine de vaisseau" on 7 September 1912. In September 1912 he was also put in command of the naval element of Brest's defences.

==== 1914–1919 ====
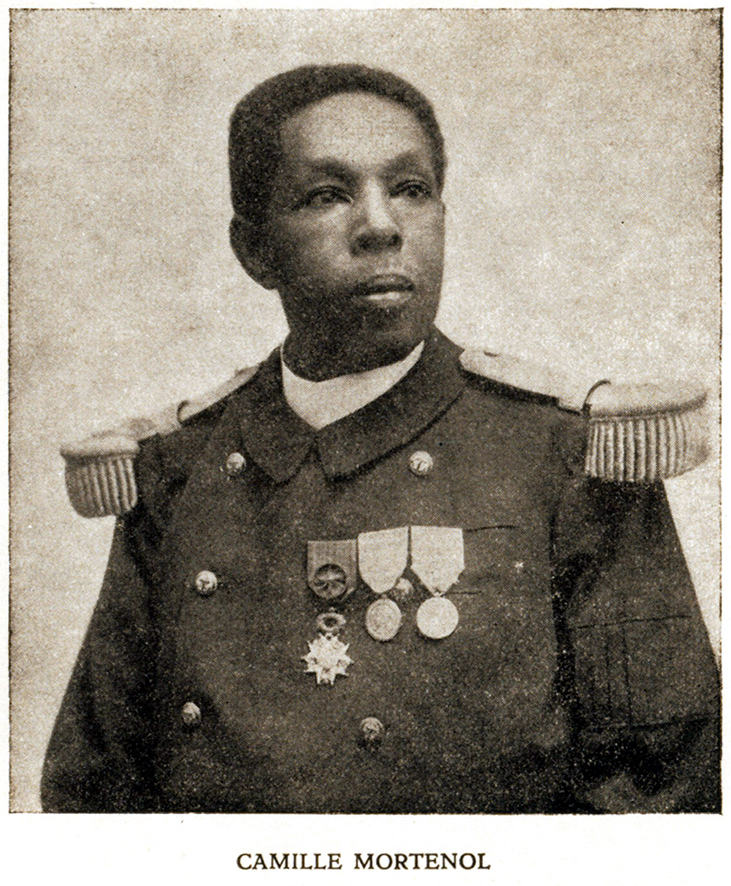
Camille Mortenol, 1917.

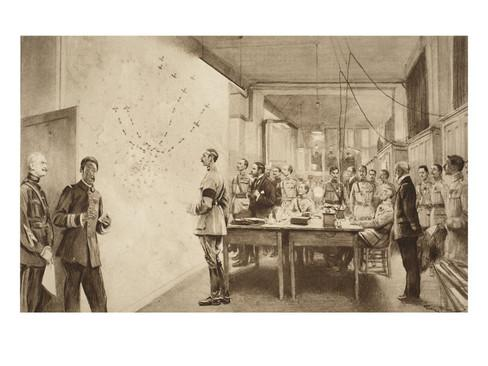
Camille Mortenol, 1917.

From March 1914 until summer 1915 he was also put in command of the unexciting task of disarming the battleship Carnot. Martenol had been aged 55 when the First World War had broken out and he sought a way to be really useful to France, especially since (with retirement approaching) he could not seek the command of a major battleship. At the start of July 1915, after capitaine de vaisseau Prère's death, Martenol asked to replace him as commander of Paris's anti-aircraft defences and he was quickly granted the post by Paris's military governor Joseph Gallieni, under whom he had already served in Madagascar. Martenol thus moved into the general's headquarters at the lycée Victor-Duruy in the 7th arrondissement - a wall plaque on that building commemorates Mortenol as the "graduate of the polytechnique, son of a freed slave" who in 1915 organised "the first anti-aircraft defence of Paris" inside that building.

His new appointment did not go unnoticed - for instance, on 10 July 1915 battalion commander Charles Arsène Pierret, then in command of the third office of Paris's military government, wrote:

The successor to commander Prère, capitaine de vaisseau Mortenol, today arrived to take command of the DCA; (Note: Défense contre-aéronefs (Anti-Aircraft Defences)) he is a black man. One is rather surprised to see this black man with five stripes and an officier of the Légion d’Honneur; it seems he is very intelligent; he is a graduate of the Polytechnique.

He held the post until the war's end and fulfilled its duties energetically. When he took it on Paris was being bombarded by Zeppelins then by the Etrich Taube and Aviatik aircraft, far superior to their French counterparts. Mortenol could not but note serious lack of materiel - his 75mm guns could only elevate up to 45 degrees, for instance. He rapidly set about improving the DCA's functioning and modernising and expanding the means at his disposal. An experimental model was installed, able to elevate to the vertical, and others followed. The searchlight posts also only had a single searchlight with reduced power. Mortenol obtained several more, transferred from other sectors, and later increased their illumination power, with one installed for instance on mont Valérien to deter night attacks by German aircraft. Transmissions were similarly increased, doubled by emergency lines.

In 1917 Mortenol reached the maximum age for his rank, but general Michel Joseph Maunoury (by then Paris's military governor) was very satisfied with his services and demanded that he be kept in post. The Minister of War Paul Painlevé approved this and Mortenol was made an artillery colonel in the reserve of the French Army so he could remain in command of the anti-aircraft defences. At the time of the Armistice in November 1918 he was in command of 10,000 men with 65 projectors with large diameter and (compared to 10 at the start of the war) 200 artillery pieces adapted for anti-aircraft purposes. In his Les hommes célèbres de la Guadeloupe Timmy Oriol did not hesitate to write that "it was to him and to Gallieni that Paris owed its safety".

=== Retirement and death ===
Mortenol finally retired from his wartime post in Paris on 15 May 1919. On 16 June 1920 he was promoted to a commander of the Légion d’Honneur, with the citation:

A superior officer of the greatest merit, at his post day and night to watch over Paris, performing his duties with rare dedication and enlightened skill.

He was awarded the decoration on 6 October 1921 in the cour d'honneur at Les Invalides. and he was finally dismissed from the naval reserves on 7 March 1922 and the army reserves on 10 January 1925. He spent his retirement in Paris, working for the Association France-Colonies and actively worked for the wellbeing of other people from Guadeloupe, particularly fishermen. He died at 5 rue François-Coppée in the 15th arrondissement of Paris on 22 December 1930, though a typographical error in Oruno Denis Lara's Mortenol, ou, Les infortunes de la servitude mistakenly placed it in the 14th arrondissement. He is buried in division 5 of Vaugirard Cemetery

In Oriol's words, in him Guadeloupe lost "one of its most glorious children, a great and valiant soldier, as modest as brave", whilst Jean-Claude Degras wrote "Mortenol's success has an undeniable symbolic significance in the collective unconscious. His countrymen saw him as the first to have broken through the hellish circle of inequality and racism". Degras added that in December 1950 the Guyanese Gaston Monnerville, himself a descendent of a slave who had become president of the Conseil de la République, attested that "Mortenol [was] an admirable example. Better than that, [he was] a model.".

== Promotions ==
- enseigne de vaisseau on 1 October 1884
- lieutenant de vaisseau on 25 August 1889
- capitaine de frégate on 7 April 1904
- capitaine de vaisseau on 7 September 1912

== Commemorations ==
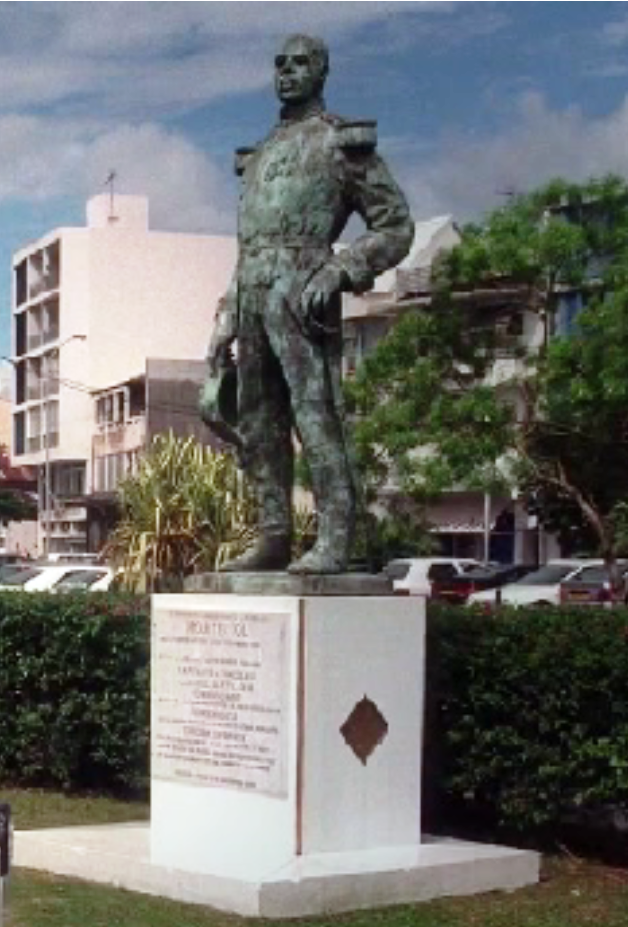
Statue of Camille Mortenol in Pointe-à-Pitre (1995)

Although a request to move his remains to the Panthéon in 1937 proved unsuccessful, rue de Turenne in Pointe-à-Pitre has been renamed after him, running from Place de la Victoire to rond-point Mortenol (the quarter of the new town to which it leads, located in the east end of the town, is named cité Mortenol). The town also has a statue of him on quai du Port de Croisière, unveiled on 3 December 1995.

In November 1984 a rue du Commandant-Mortenol was inaugurated in the 10th arrondissement by Jacques Chirac, then mayor of Paris. A Société nationale de sauvetage en mer star in Hendaye is named after him. A "Sosthène Mortenol 1859 - 1930" stamp was issued in 2018 by La Poste, first used in Paris at the Carré d'Encre stamp shop and in Pointe-à-Pitre on 13 and 14 April 2018.

== Bibliography ==
In French unless otherwise specified.

- Bangou, Henri (1963). La Guadeloupe, 1848-1939. Vichy: Editions du Centre. ISBN 978-2-8580-2845-0. OCLC 769371356.
- Lévy, Albert; Pinet, G. (1894). "Armand Silvestre". L'argot de l'X illustré par les X. Paris: Emile Testard. p. 126.
- Bertout de Solières, François (1912). Les hauts faits de l'armée coloniale: ses héros : Annam, Côte d'Ivoire, Chine, Dahomey, Guyane, Madagascar, Maroc, Ouadaï, Sahara, Sénegal, Soudan, Tchad, Tonkin, Tunisie, etc. Rouen: J. Girieud. pp. 140–141.
- Oriol, Timmy; Moynac, Charles (1935). Les hommes célèbres de la Guadeloupe. Basse-Terre. pp. 341–345. OCLC 459925062.
- Lara, Oruno Denis (1985). Le commandant Mortenol: un officier guadeloupéen dans la "Royale". Épinay: Centre de Recherches Caraïbes-Amériques. ISBN 2-905787-00-7. OCLC 230860068.
- Beti, Mongo; Tobner, Odile (1989). Dictionnaire de la négritude. Paris: L'Harmattan. ISBN 2-7384-0494-4. OCLC 254895839.
- Vidaling, Raphaële (1998). Le patrimoine des communes de la Guadeloupe. Charenton-le-Pont: Éditions Flohic. ISBN 2-84234-031-0. OCLC 467984406.
- Lara, Oruno Denis (2001). Mortenol, ou, Les infortunes de la servitude. Paris: L'Harmattan. ISBN 2-7475-1039-5. OCLC 231968698.
- Fisher-Blanchet, Inez; Lara, Oruno Denis (2001). Capitaine de Vaisseau exemplaire: Croisières et campagnes. Paris: Éditions L'Harmattan. ISBN 2-7475-1554-0. OCLC 49199585.
- Degras, Jean-Claude (2008). Camille Mortenol: l'épopée du capitaine des vents : biographie. Paris: Éditions Le Manuscrit. ISBN 978-2-304-00510-3. OCLC 465692947.
- Broussillon, Ary (2008). La Guadeloupe dans la première Guerre Mondiale. Gourbeyre: Éditions Nestor. p. 44. ISBN 978-2-916239-13-2. OCLC 706854005.
- Lara, Oruno Denis (2010). Mortenol: Un colonisé exemplaire, 1856-1930. Paris: Éditions L'Harmattan. ISBN 978-2-296-11073-1. OCLC 705515259.
- Théobald, Gérald (2014). La Liberté est ou n'est pas... Paris: Editions Publibook. ISBN 978-2-342-02233-9. OCLC 893635958.
- Valery, Rouben (2014). Noir Blanc Rouge - Trente-cinq noirs oubliés de l'histoire de France. Paris: La Librairie Vuibert. ISBN 978-2-311-10019-8. OCLC 880551476.
- Lara, Oruno Denis (2015). De l'oubli à l'histoire: espace et identité Caraïbes : Guadeloupe, Guyane, Haïti, Martinique. Paris: Éditions L'Harmattan. ISBN 978-2-343-06917-3. OCLC 919015336.
