= Vaugirard Cemetery =

Cemetery in Paris, France

Coordinates: 48°50′18″N 2°17′05″E

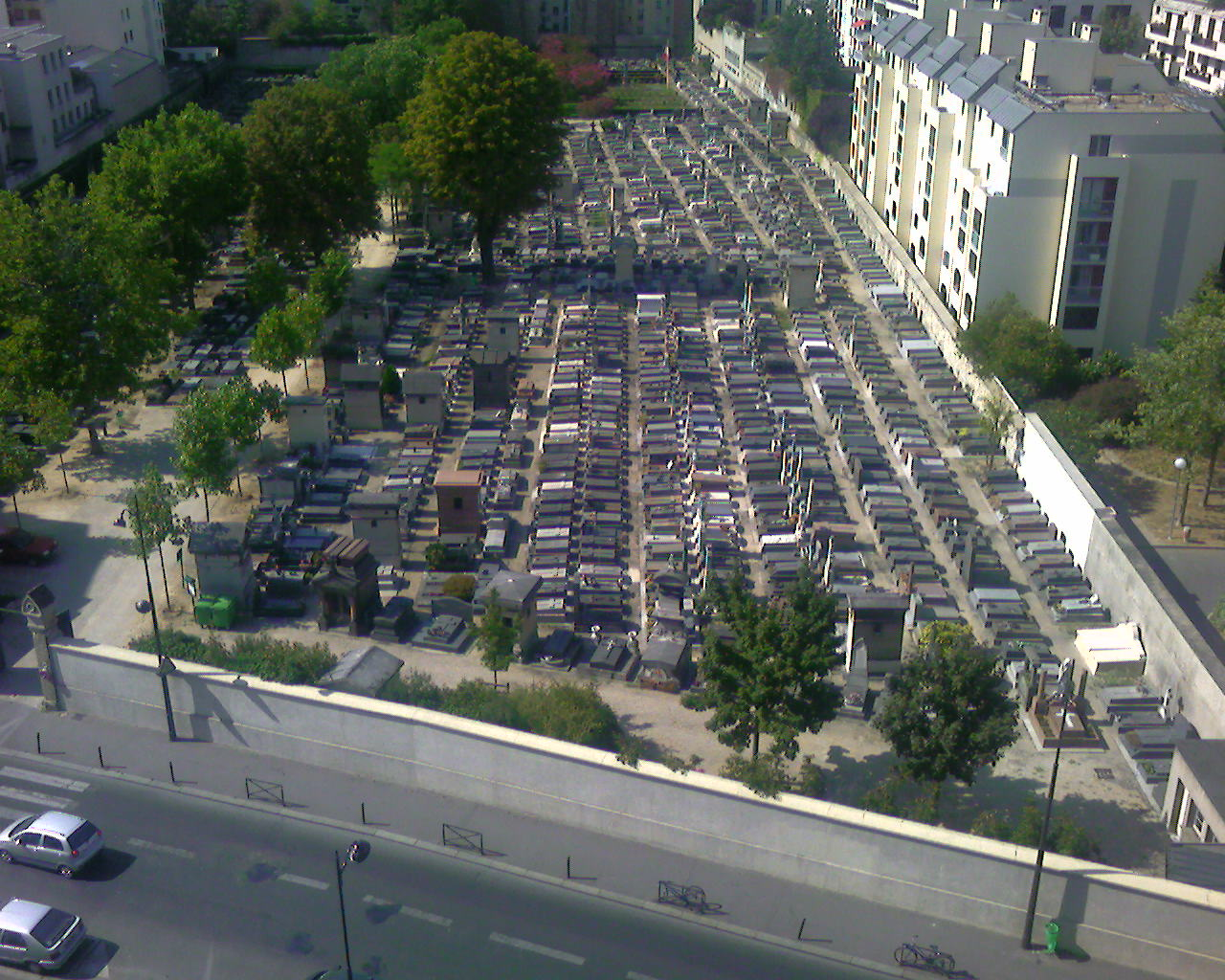

Vaugirard Cemetery (cimetière de Vaugirard) is a cemetery in Paris, located at 320 rue Lecourbe and occupying 1.5 hectares of land to the west of that street. It opened in 1787 (or 1798 according to an information panel at its entrance) and contains 2500 tombs and 95 trees from 17 different species, making it one of the oldest cemeteries still active in the city.

== History ==
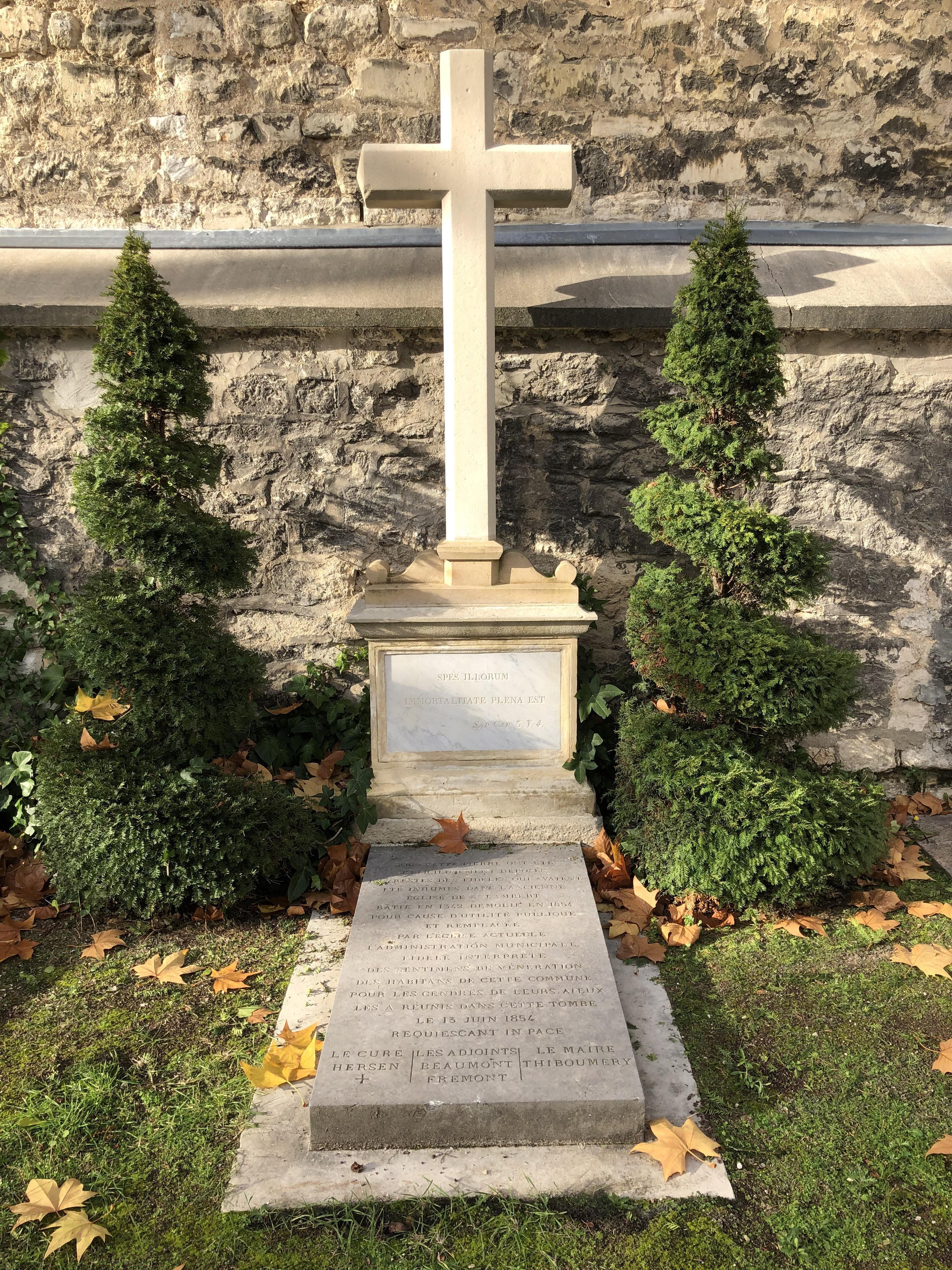
Vault opened in 1854 for the remains discovered during the demolition of the former church of Saint-Lambert to build a new church.

It is the third cemetery to bear that name. It was used by the inhabitants of Grenelle before it had its own cemetery. The town of Vaugirard and its cemetery were both merged into the city of Paris in 1860 and two years later a large military plot was added for inhabitants of les Invalides, with casualties from both world wars later added.

== Burials ==
- Louis Aubert, composer
- Michel Baroin (division 12)
- Lucien Besnard, playwright (division 14)
- Albert Bettannier, painter (division 16)
- Hector Bianciotti, journalist, writer and academic (division 18)
- Marguerite Bourcet, writer
- Jean-Baptiste Boyer (1783-1839), sculptor (division 21)
- Clara Candiani, journaliste
- Adolphe Chérioux, president of the town council of Paris (division 6)
- canon Antoine-Louis Cornette, founder of scouting in France (division 17)
- Commandant Antony Cottes (1871-1915), killed in action, his tomb has been classed as remarkable (division 2)
- Jean-Baptiste Dalesme, général baron of the Empire, governor of the island of Elba (1810-1815), military commandant of the Invalides (1830-1832)
- cardinal Jean Daniélou (division 6)
- cardinal Henri de Lubac, churchman (division 6)
- père Bertrand de Margerie, Jesuit (division 6)
- Paul Doumer, président du Sénat, président de la République (buried with his sons, killed in the First World War) (division 13)
- Paul Echard, general (division 4)
- Jacques Friedmann, high-level civil servant (division 2)
- Jean Gaudreau, abbot (division 10)
- Henri Giraud, secretary of state (division 13)
- Nicolas Groult d'Arcy, churchman, town councillor of Vaugirard, landowner (division 15)
- Jean Lartéguy, writer and journalist, Osty tomb in the military plot (division 17)
- Léon Lyon-Caen, first honorary president of the Cour de cassation and president of the MRAP (division 7)
- William Putnam McCabe, United Irish exile
- Edmond Marchal, Fernand Tillet and Edgard Trullet, members of the Ligue des patriotes and/or of the Jeunesses patriotes killed in the rue Damrémont massacre
- Jacques Marette, minister (division 4)
- Henri Mouton, scientist
- Eugène Marsan, writer and journalist
- Bernard Niquet, prefect, technical counsellor to the presidency of the Republic, counsellor of state (division 15)
- Amédée Poilleux, soldier, buried in the military plot
- Tomb of the fondation Michelle-Darty
- Camille Mortenol, naval officer (division 5)
- Henri-Charles Oulevay, painter, caricaturist, graphic artist and engraver
- Marius Plateau (monument by Maxime Real del Sarte) (division 4) and several members of Action française :
  - Ernest Berger (division 7)
  - Georges Calzant
  - Marcel Langlois (division 7)
  - Pierre Juhel
- The cousins Marius-Ary Leblond, writers (division 2)
- Henri Pottevin, biologist and politician
- Émile Reynaud, photograph, artist and teacher, inventor of the praxinoscope (cenotaph only)
- Pierre Saka, producer of L'Oreille en coin (division 8)
- Jules Scamaroni (1890-1938), prefect (division 13)
- Christian Vebel, signer
- Thérèse Vimont (1893-1972), painter (division 13)
- Adolphe Vincent, lawyer and politician
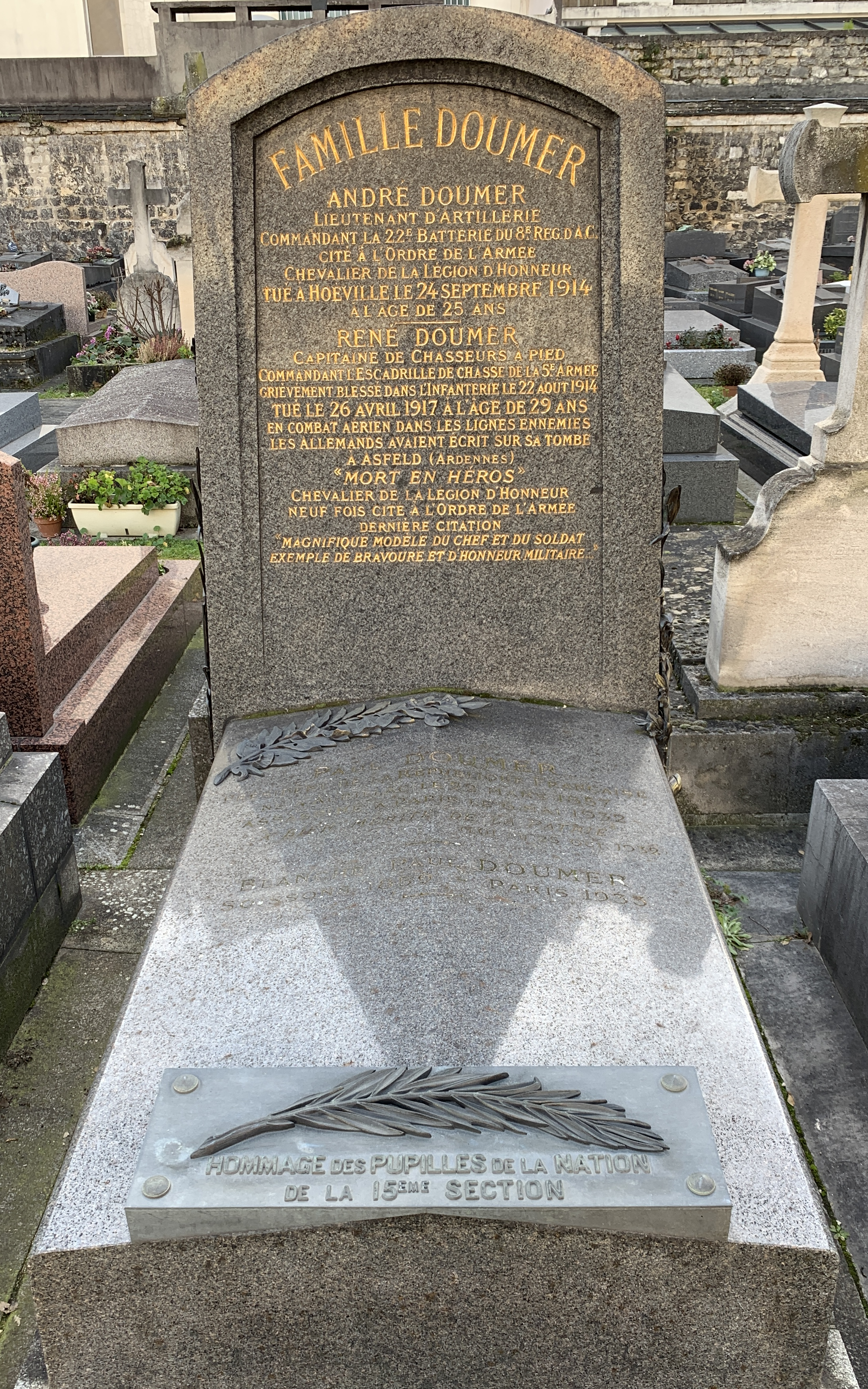
Tomb of Paul Doumer.

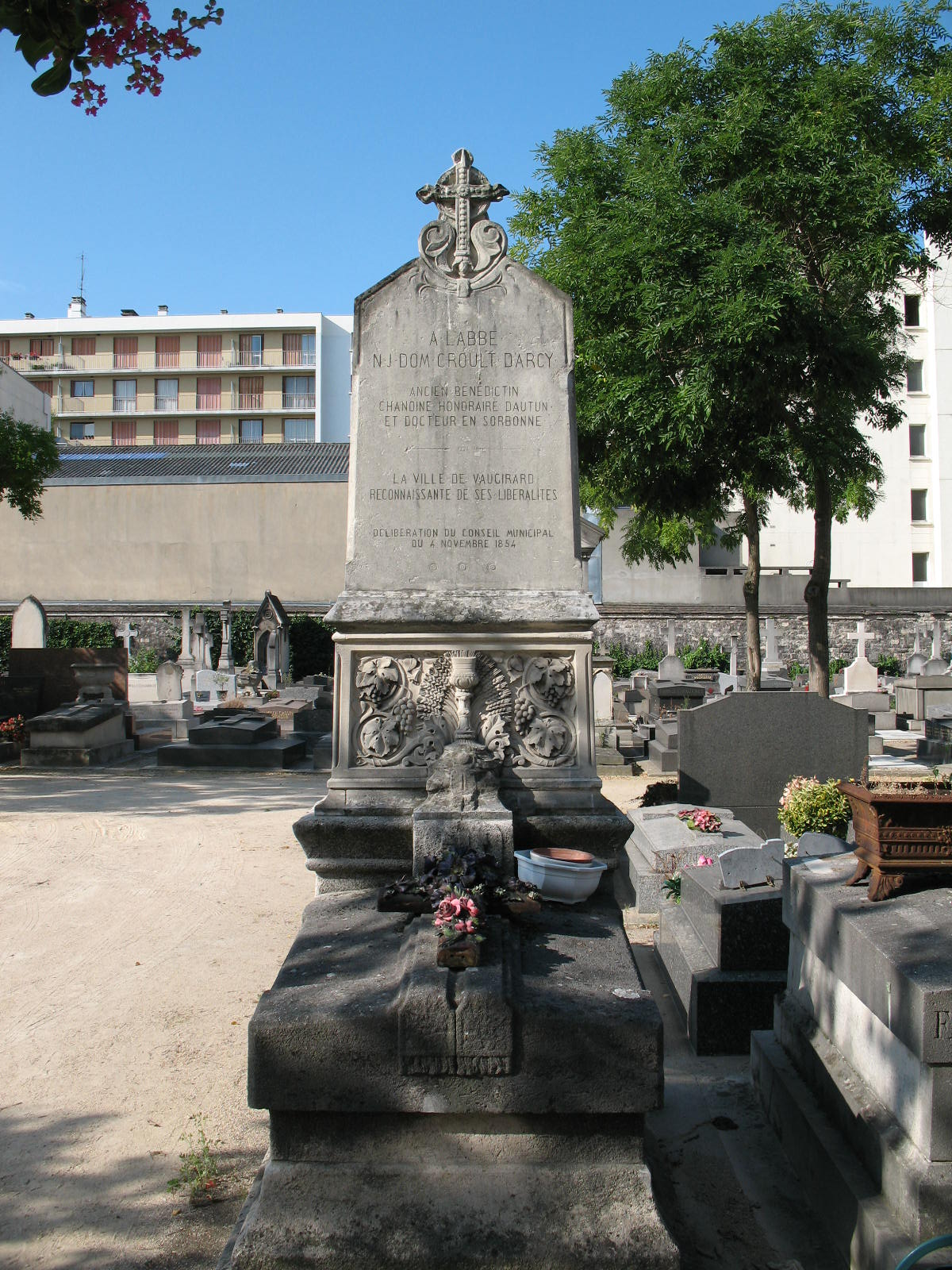
Tomb of abbé Groult.

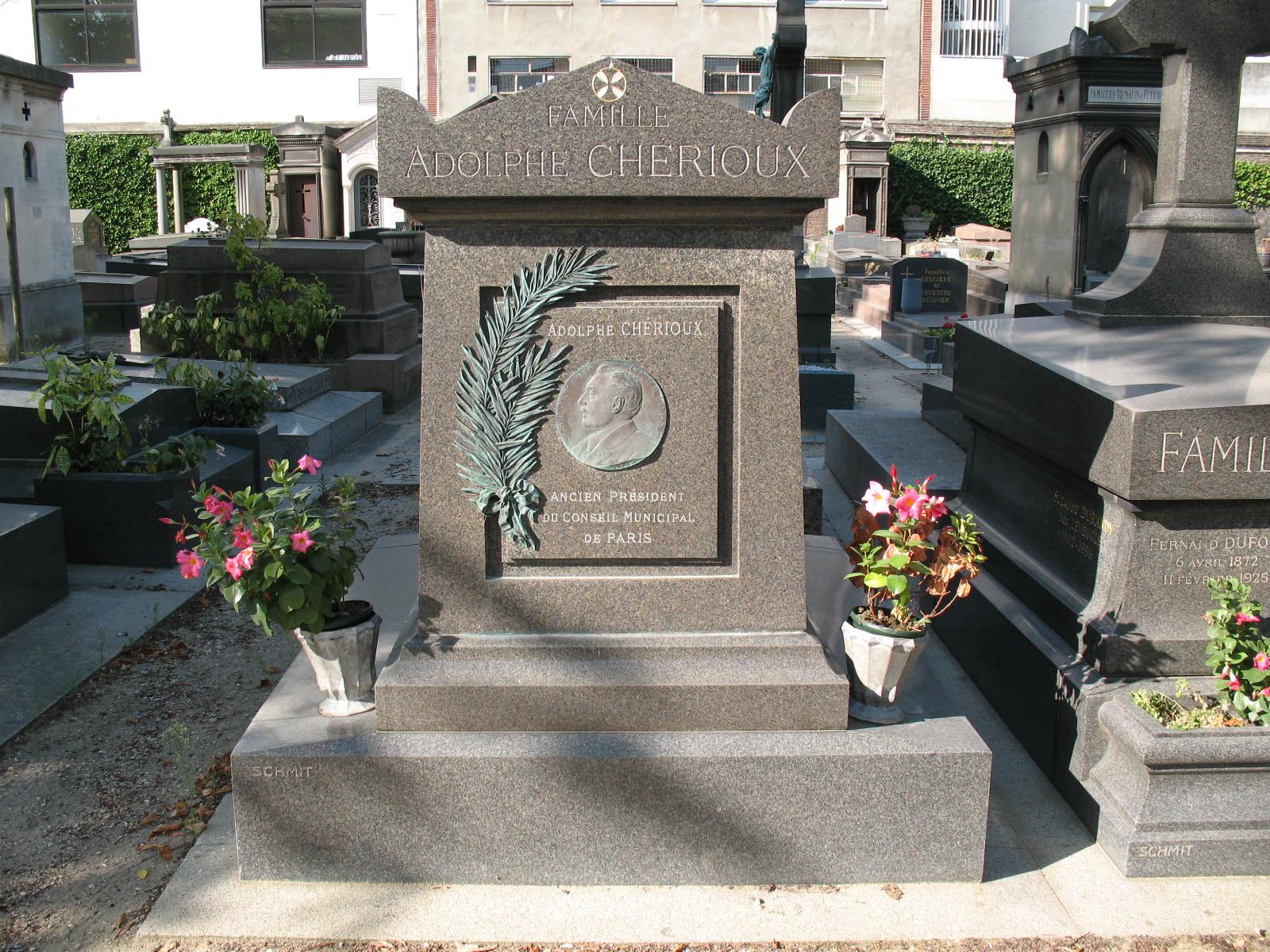
Tomb of Adolphe Chérioux.

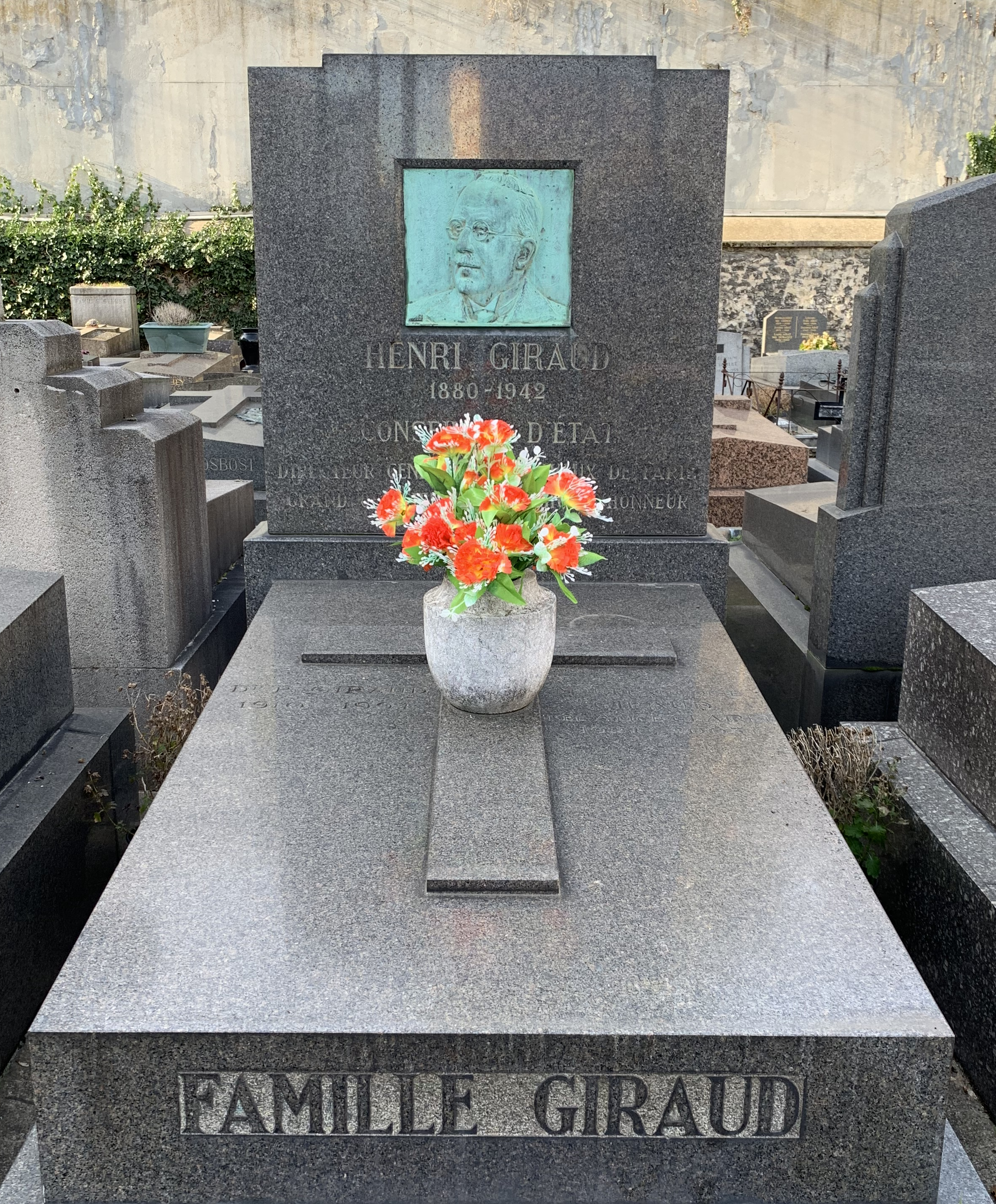
Tomb of Henri Giraud.

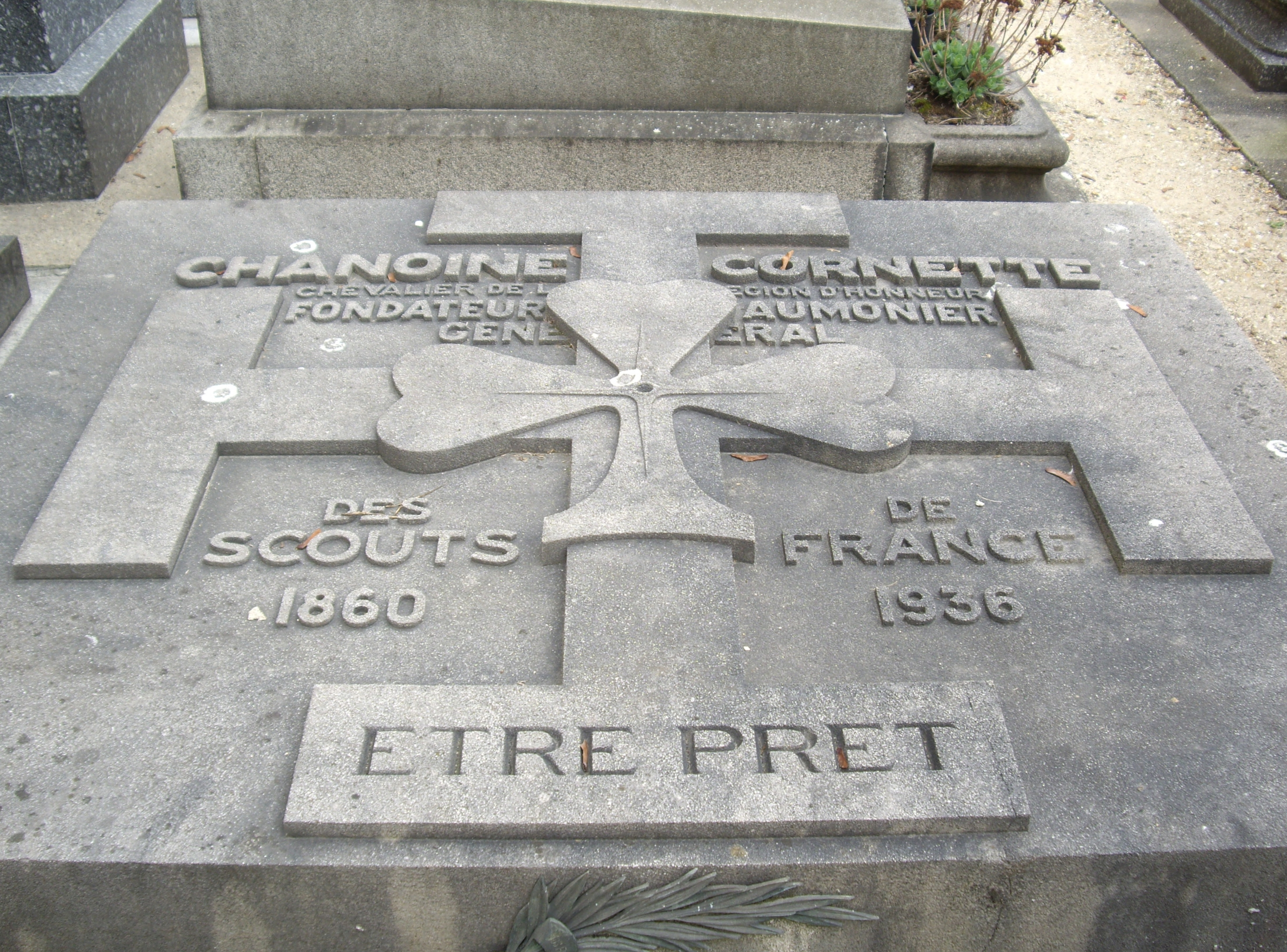
Tomb of canon Cornette.

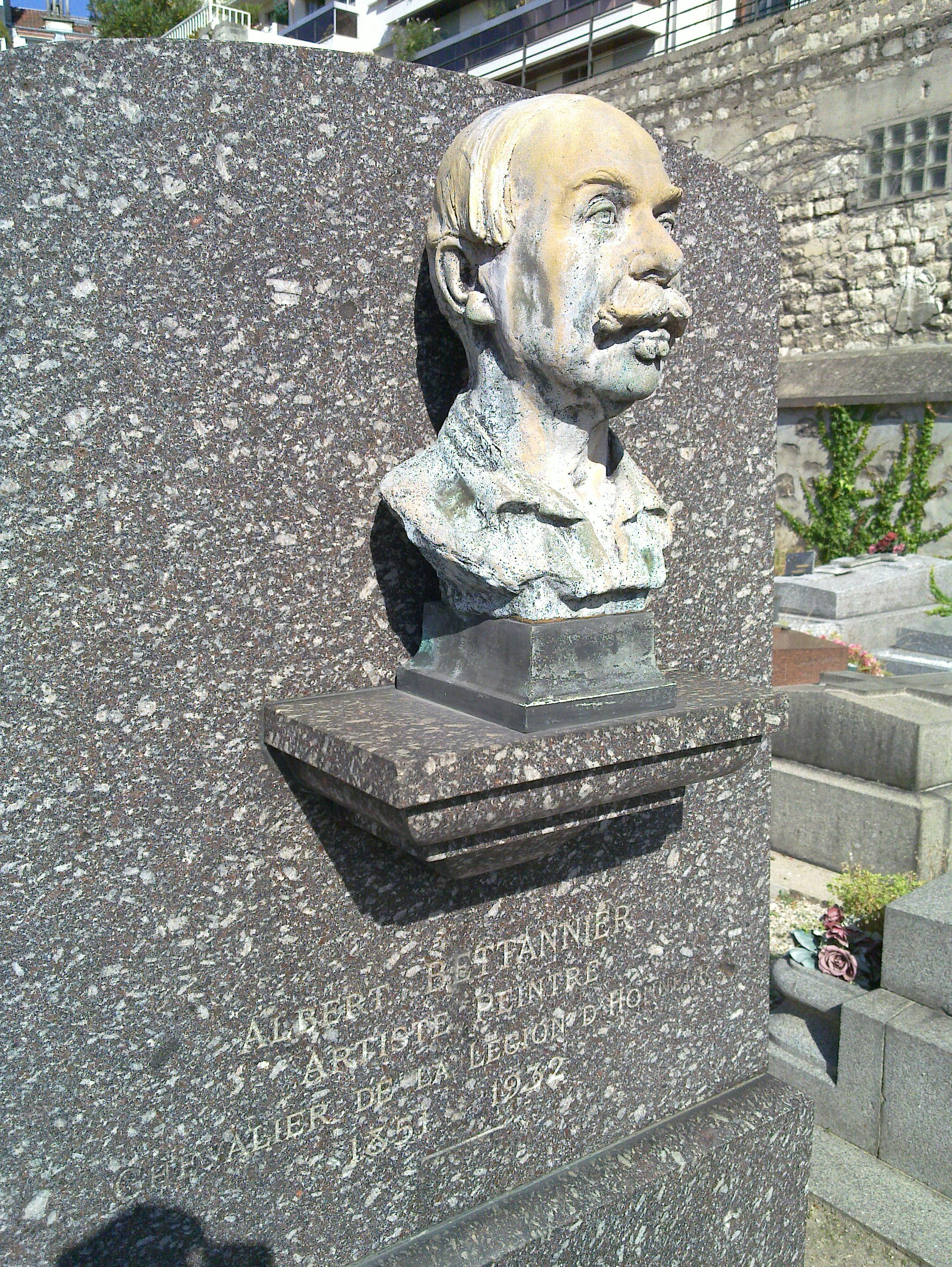
Tomb of Albert Bettannier.

== Bibliography ==
- (in French) Recueil de tombeaux des quatre cimetières de Paris avec leurs épitaphes et inscriptions. Tome 1 (Cimetières du Père-Lachaise, de Montmartre, de Vaugirard et de Sainte-Catherine)
- (in French) Recueil de tombeaux des quatre cimetières de Paris avec leurs épitaphes et inscriptions. Tome 2 (Cimetières du Père-Lachaise, de Montmartre, de Vaugirard et de Sainte-Catherine)
