= Oruno Lara =

Guadeloupean poet, author and historian

- Born: 1879; Guadeloupe
- Died: 1924 (aged 44–45)
- Occupations: Poet, author, historian

Oruno Lara (1879 – 1924) was a Guadeloupean poet, author and historian, not to be confused with his grandson Dr. Oruno D. Lara, also a historian. Head of Pointe-à-Pitre's Guadeloupe Littéraire journal, he arrived in France in 1914 with hopes of further developing his project of a literary and political journal. He was soon engulfed in the first World War until 1919 and following traumas caused by the inhalation of gases used during the war, he was inspired to become a historian. Upon his return from war, he published a history of Guadeloupe, a text which was used to teach several generations of Guadeloupean school children. In 1919, he founded the monthly Le Monde Colonial (The Colonial World) which echoed W. E. B. Du Bois' and the first Pan-African Congress' denunciations of the racism inherent to European colonialism. In 1923 he wrote the novel Question de Couleurs: Blanches et Noirs, Roman de Moeurs ( i.e. An issue of Colors: Whites and Blacks, a Novel)

== Career as a typographer and pressman ==
Born in Guadeloupe, Oruno Lara worked from the age of 11 as an apprentice typographer at the press for the paper La Vérité, which had been founded in 1888. He was then hired as a typographer at Courrier de la Guadeloupe and at La République in 1900. He went on to become an editor at L'Indépendant de la Pointe-à-Pitre (1901) and at the papers La Démocratie, La Vérité, at L'Émancipation and at Le Nouvelliste, founded by his brother Hildevert-Adolphe in 1909. Their brother Augereau founded L'Homme Enchaîné (aka The Chained Man) and L'Action.

Oruno Lara eventually created the journal La Guadeloupe Littéraire, publishing the work of local poets.

== Legacy as a historian ==
Lara was the first Guadeloupean historian to break from the dominant historiography of French colonial planters and administrators by looking at the totality of influences on Guadeloupe, beyond just the French colonialist narrative. He was also the first to strive to transmit this history to Guadeloupean children, against great odds. He wrote in the preface to his 1921 book La Guadeloupe physique, économique, agricole, commerciale, financière, politique et sociale de la découverte à nos jours (1492-1900):

"It is really the job of one of us to write our own history; and when born of yesterday we seem to have neither past nor official identity, it behooves one of us to erect a more beautiful past... Ignorance of yesterday is a great weakness."

His La Guadeloupe de la Découverte à Nos Jours was the first history book about Guadeloupe written by a non-white.

== Writing style and racial consciousness ==
Despite emulating the writing style of white creole writers from his native Guadeloupe, Lara is noted as being among the first non-white Guadeloupean authors to assert black or mulatto consciousness and to write on race, racial tension and colorism.

== Ancestors, siblings and spouse ==
Oruno Lara's father Moïse Lara had been a slave until 1843. Moïse's mother Bertilde had been a slave until 1848. Moïse Lara was freed from slavery at the age of 21 in 1843 while he was a cook. Moïse Lara then moved to Pointe-à-Pitre where he worked as a carpenter while collaborating to the creation of the paper Le Progrès in 1849. That same year he participated in demonstrations against the electoral campaign for the legislative Assembly of the candidate Bissette who was an ally of the French planters of Martinique. Moïse wrote a letter to the Progrès registering his disapproval.

Born in 1822, Moïse Lara worked hard to leave his children extensive documentation of events that he witnessed, in addition to his convictions. Moïse married Oruno's mother Amélie Pédurand in 1879. They had four children: Hildevert-Adolphe (1876), Oruno (1879), Augereau and Ferlande. Amélie had been born in 1848 to a mulatto woman from Grands Fonds in Sainte-Anne, Guadeloupe who died of cholera in 1865. She often told stories from the times of her husband Moïse's demonstrations and political agitation against slavery and the colonial order. Oruno had another brother, Moïse's first son Sully Lara who wrote novels and essays.

This legacy likely motivated Oruno Lara's publication of his book on Guadeloupean history in 1921 which he published with the help of his wife—teacher and poet Agathe Réache—against great odds: unemployment, archives far away in Europe, war and disease.

=== Origins of the name Lara ===
Oruno Lara's father Moïse adopted the name Lara after he was emancipated from slavery. Oruno D. Lara has written that the name was likely inspired by the fact that Moïse's ancestors were from Venezuela.

== Heirs ==
Oruno Lara's grandson Oruno D. Lara, a prolific historian, was born after his death.

Another grandson Christian Lara, is a noted filmmaker.

Oruna Lara's great-grandson is Kernan Heinz, named after a well-known Spanish historian called Hernán Cortés.

== Published books ==
- Lara, Oruno (1921), La Guadeloupe physique, économique, agricole, commerciale, financière, politique et sociale de la découverte à nos jours (1492–1900).
- Lara, Oruno (1923), Question de Couleurs: Blanches et Noirs. Roman de Moeurs.
