= Albert Bettannier =

French painter

- Born: 12 August 1851; Metz, France
- Died: 17 November 1932 (aged 81); Paris, France
- Known for: Painting

Nicolas Albert Bettannier (12 August 1851 – 17 November 1932) was a French painter in the era of the French Third Republic.

== Life ==
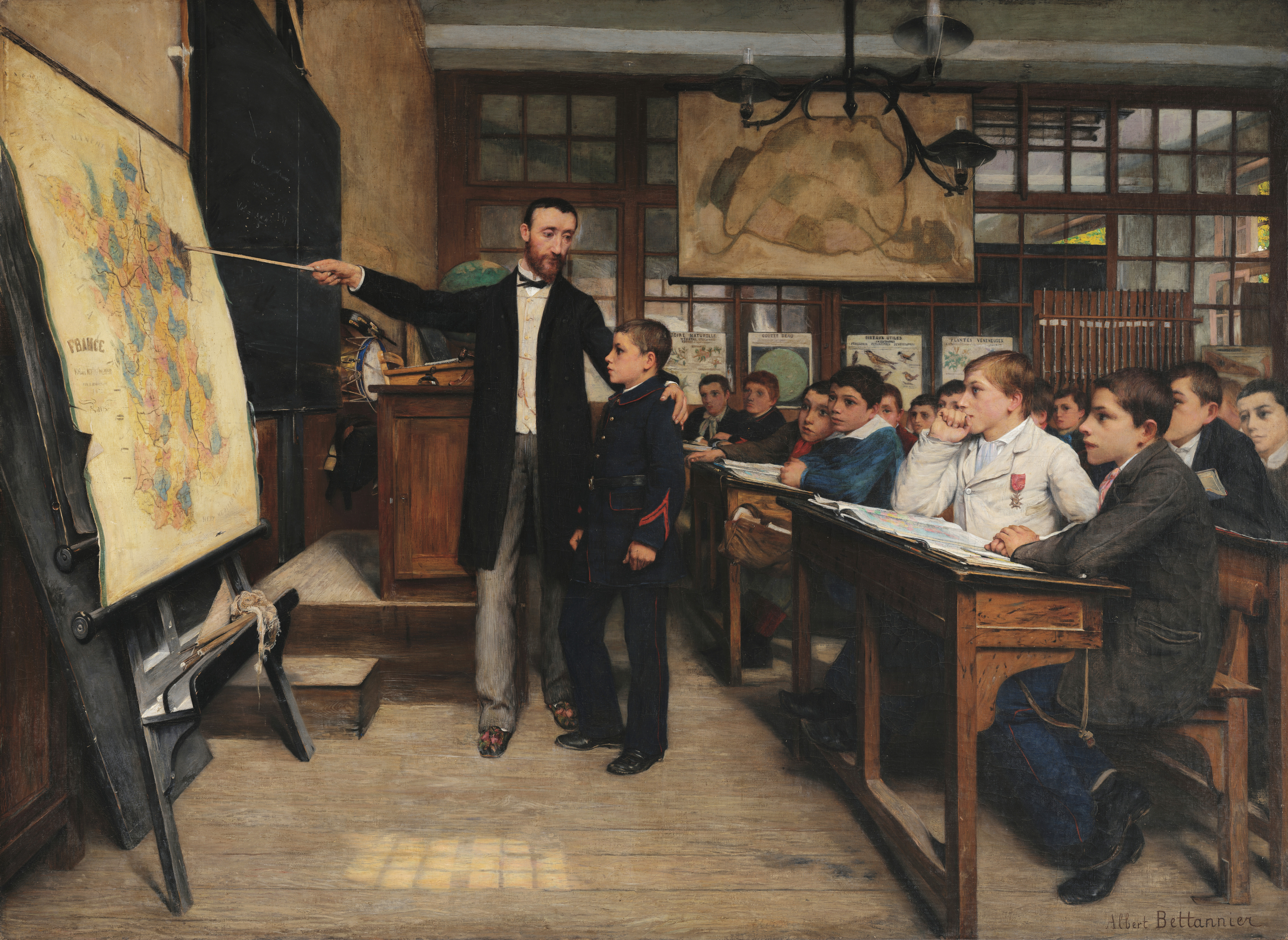
La Tache Noire – one of Bettannier's most famous paintings. It depicts a child being taught about the "lost" province of Alsace-Lorraine in the aftermath of the Franco-Prussian War. This loss is a frequently recurring theme in his work.

Bettannier was born in Metz in 1851. He was the son of Jean Bettannier and Marie Bellatte. He studied in the Moselle department. After the ceding of his native region Alsace-Lorraine to Germany following the French defeat in the Franco-Prussian War of 1871, he decided to keep his French nationality and moved to Paris. He enrolled in the Académie des beaux-arts where he followed courses given by Henri Lehmann and Isidore Pils. From 1881 onwards, he acquired some notoriety in the Salon des artistes français, where he frequently showed paintings depicting the loss of Alsace-Lorraine to Germany. He was a fierce proponent of French revanchism. The loss of Alsace-Lorraine was a recurring theme in his work.

Albert Bettannier was awarded the Legion d'honneur in 1908 for his work as a painter.

He died on 17 November 1932 and is buried at Vaugirard Cemetery in Paris.

== Work ==
- La Tache noire (The Black Spot), Deutsches Historisches Museum, Berlin, 1887
- Le désespoir (The Despair), Musée de l'Ermitage, Saint-Pétersbourg, 1893
- La Conquête de la Lorraine (The Conquest of Lorraine), 1910
- L'Oiseau de France (The Bird of France), 1912.

== Gallery ==
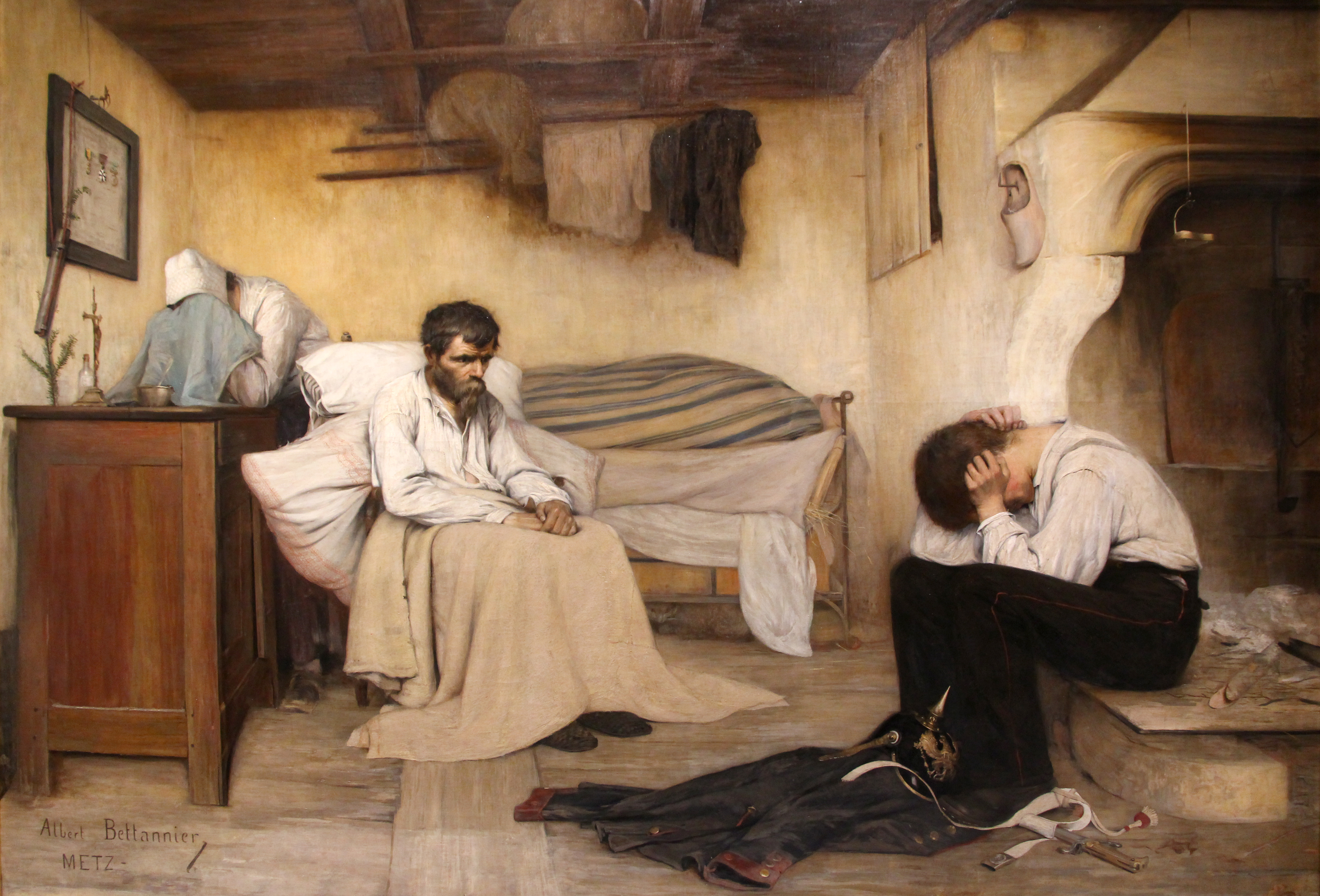
Le Désespoir ou Les Annexés en Lorraine, 1883

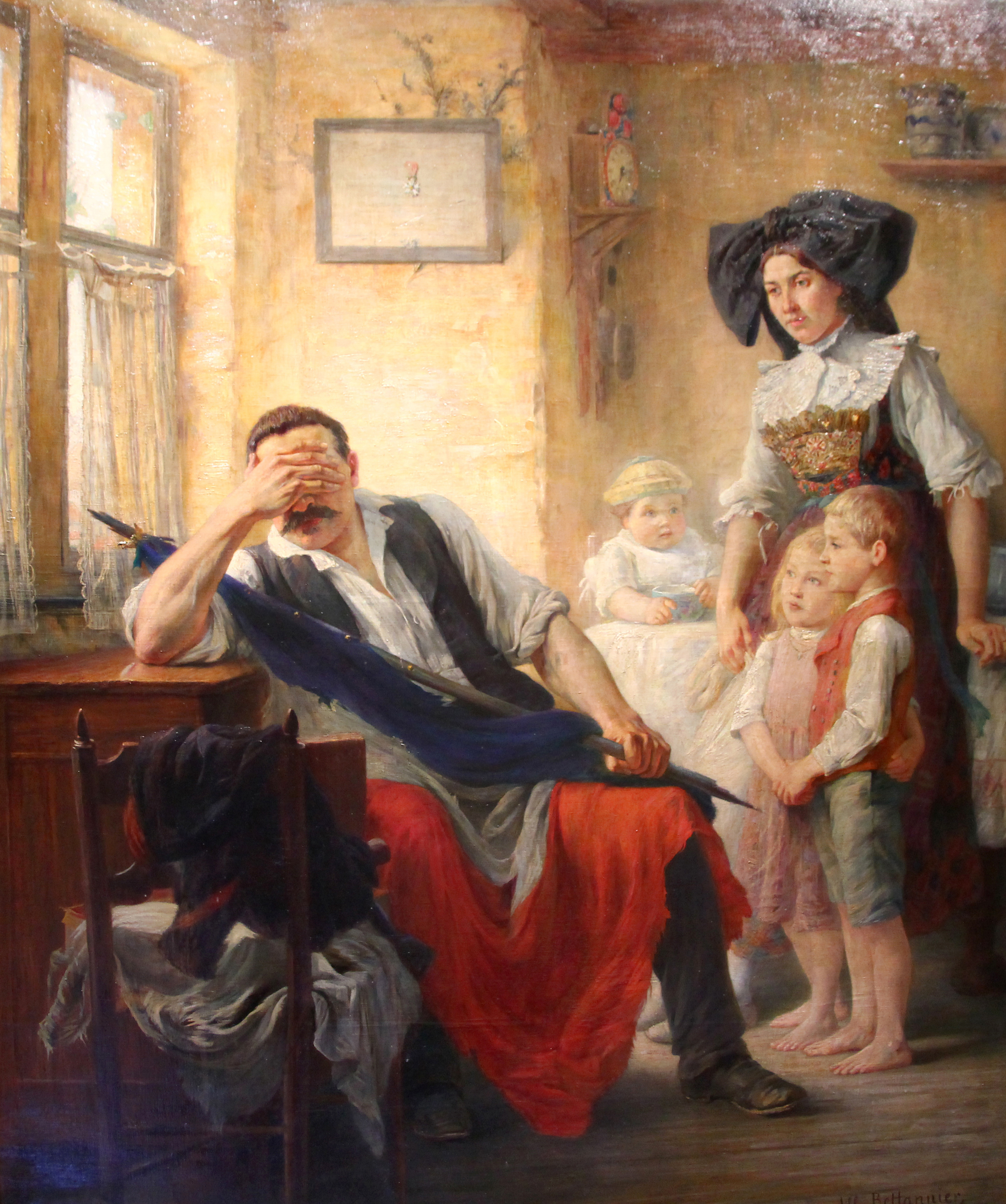
Les Annexés en Alsace, 1911

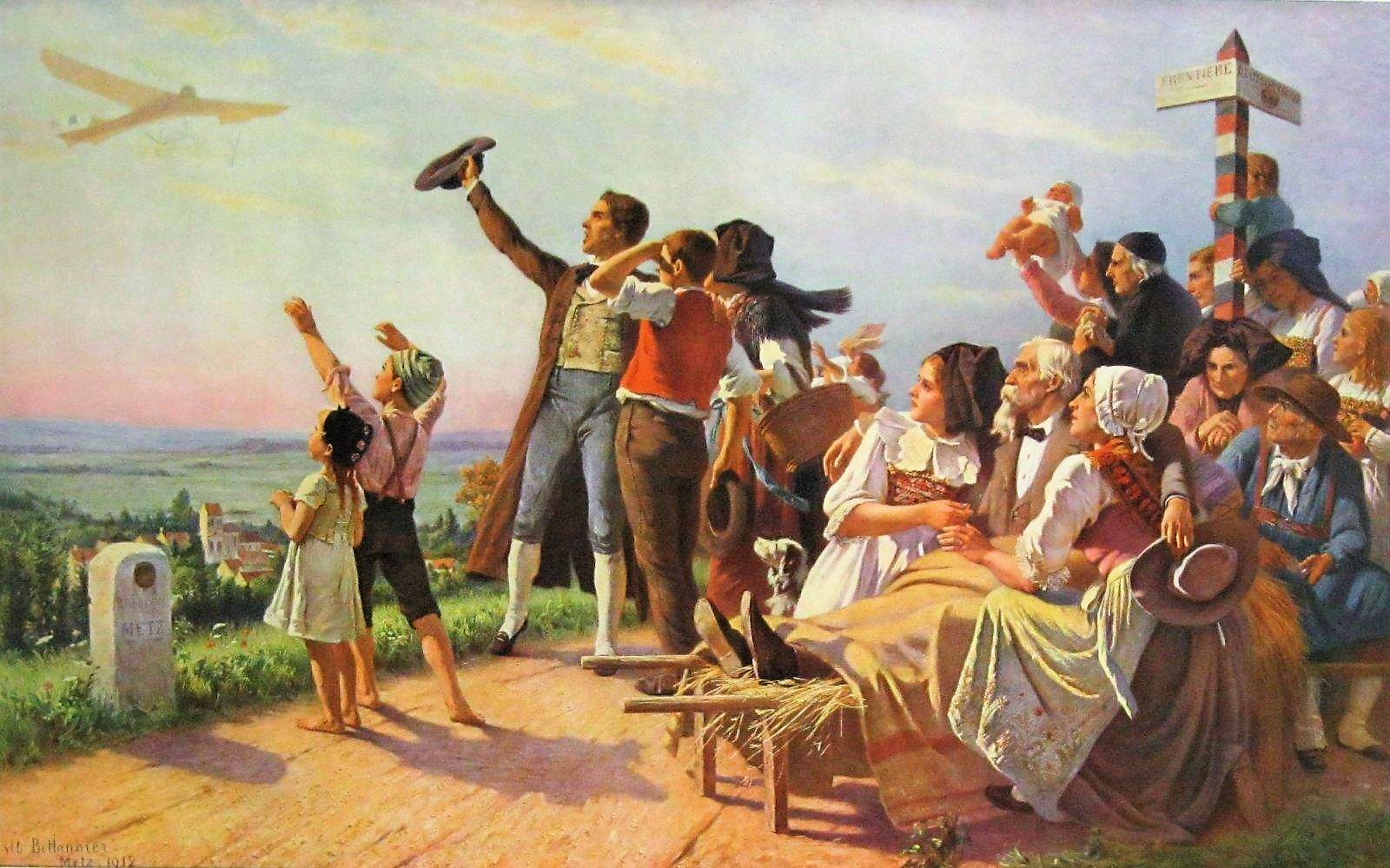
The Bird of France, 1912

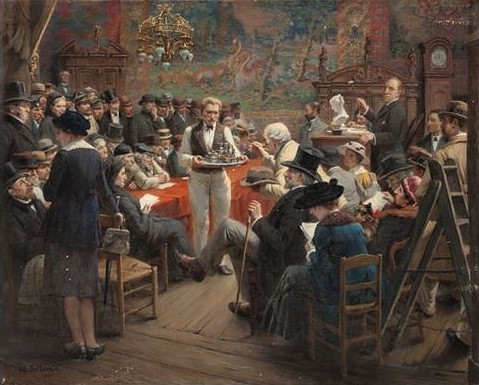
Enchères à l'Hôtel Drouot, 1921
