= Oruno D. Lara =

French historian

Dr. Oruno Denis Lara is a French historian born in Basse-Terre, Guadeloupe, not to be confused with his grandfather Oruno Lara (1879–1924), also a historian. He has written extensively on the history of the Caribbean.

He is the director of the Centre de Recherches Caraïbes-Amériques (CERCAM) of Université Paris X-Nanterre. He wrote and defended a thesis in 1971 on Africa and the Caribbean entitled "From the Atlantic to the Caribbean: Maroon Blacks and Slave Revolts, XVIth and XVIIth Centuries". He created L'Institut Caraïbes de Recherches Internationales en Sciences Humaines et Sociales (aka Caribbean Institute for International Research in Human and Social Sciences) in Guadeloupe in 1982. He has taught in Guadeloupe, at the Université Paris VII, at Université de Yaoundé, and at the department of Black studies at City College in New York.

== Beginnings ==
Oruno D. Lara was born in Basse-Terre, on a street named Rue Baudot close to the ocean. He spent his childhood in that town, the capital of Guadeloupe, situated at the foot of the Soufrière volcano. His parents are from Grands Fonds, Sainte-Anne and Moule, all cities in Guadeloupe. As a child, he was frequently beaten by his father in complicity with his mother's silence. He was often the only person to frequent the local library where Ms. Segrettier the librarian often ordered him books. He was an avid collector of stamps and attended stamp collector meetings on Sundays while a young boy.

=== Origins ===
His known ancestors include Bertilde, a Guadeloupean woman enslaved until 1848 and her son Moïse Lara, who was enslaved in Guadeloupe until 1843. Moïse is the father of the elder Oruno Lara (1879–1924).

=== Origins of the name Lara ===
Dr. Lara's great-grandfather Moïse adopted the name Lara after he was emancipated from slavery. Dr. Lara has written that the name was likely inspired by the fact that Moïse's ancestors were from Venezuela.

== Definition of the Caribbean ==
Lara is noted for his unique definition of the Caribbean geographical area which he sees as fluid and situational. Depending on the situation and the theme being studied, he sometimes includes surrounding continental areas in South, North and Central America such as Brazil, Venezuela and Mexico in the region.

== Published books ==
- Lara Guadeloupe: Les propriétaires d'esclaves en 1848 (French Edition, with co-author Inez ).
- Propriétaires d'esclaves en 1848: Martinique, Guyane, Saint-Barthélemy, Sénégal (French Edition)
- La naissance du Panafricanisme: Les racines caraïbes, américaines et africaines du mouvement au XIXe siècle (French Edition)
- Caraïbes en Construction (1992)
- La Guadeloupe dans l'Histoire (Preface, 1999)
- Capitaine de Vaisseau Mortenol (2001)
- Mortenol ou les Infortunes de la Servitude (2001)
- Caraïbes Entre Liberté et Indépendance (2002)
- La Liberté Assassinée (2005)
- La Colonisation Aussi Est Un Crime (2005)
- Space and History in The Caribbean (2006)

== See also ==
- Bibliography of books published at L'Harmattan
