= Éditions Le Manuscrit =

French publishing house

Éditions Le Manuscrit is a French publishing house.

== History ==
Founded in 2000 by Christian Berst, an art gallery owner and specialist in outsider art, in the chapitre.com line which he had also co-founded and headed it was taken over at the end of 2001 by financier Nicolas Philippe then by éditions StoryLab in 2015.

Its catalogue now includes around 7000 books, available in all formats.
