= Henri Martin (political activist and physician) =

French militant right-wing activist

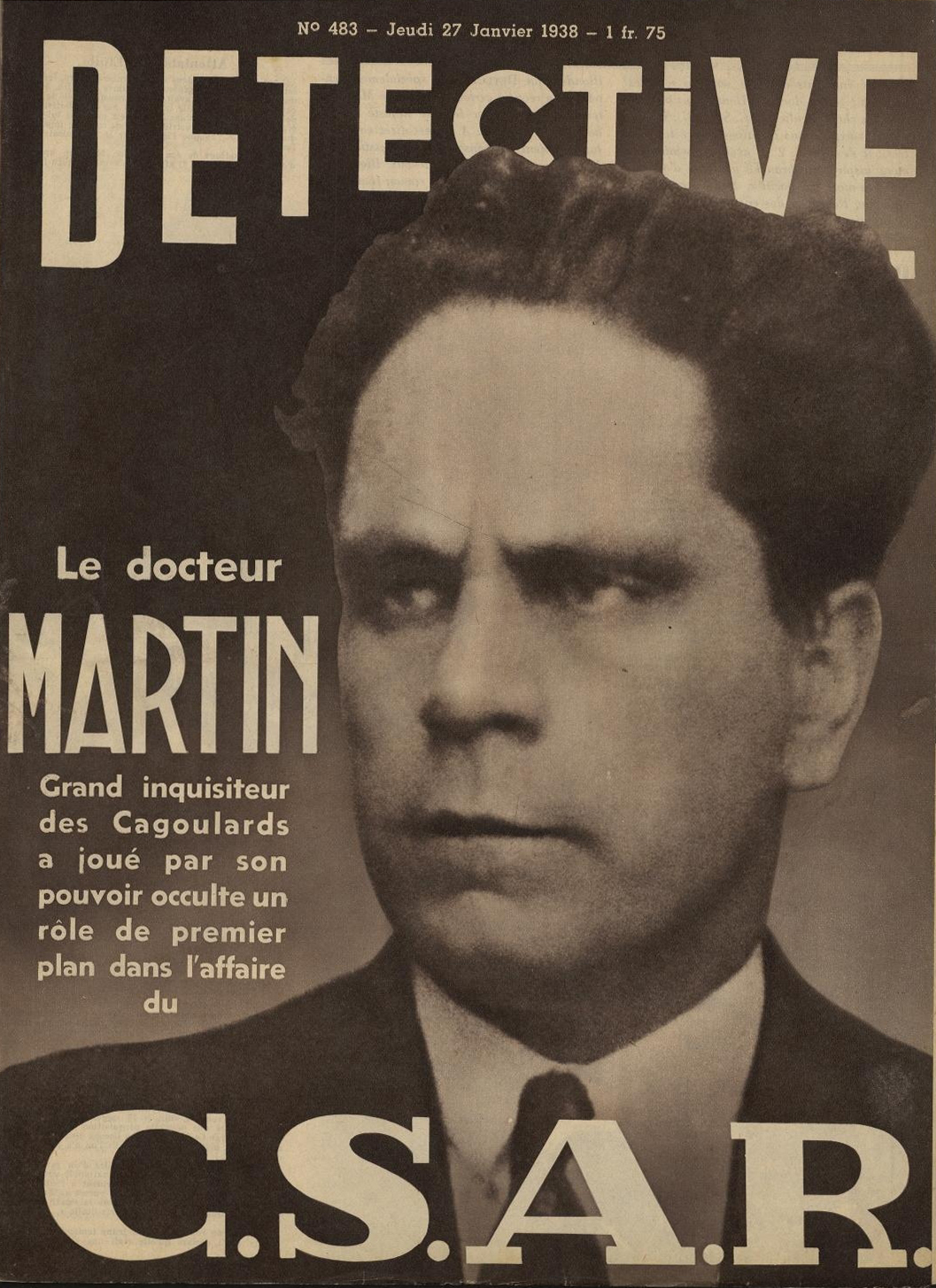
- Henri Martin in 1938
- Born: Félix Victor Henri Martin; 23 February 1895; Paris
- Died: 5 June 1969 (aged 74); Bicêtre Hospital
- Other names: le docteur Martin, le Bib, commander Bernard
- Occupations: political activist, physician, soldier, resister
- Known for: extreme-right-wing politics, coup d'état plots

Félix Victor Henri Martin, known as Le docteur Martin and le Bib, (23 February 1895 – 6 June 1969) was a French physician, extreme-right-wing militant activist, resister and soldier in two World wars.

== Biography ==
He was born in Paris to Sophie Henriette Quizerme and Adolphe Gilbert Martin. He became a hospital intern and fought voluntarily at the western front during WWI in the dragoons at Tours, transferring to 112e régiment d’artillerie lourde [112th heavy artillery regiment] as an auxiliary doctor. After the war, he resumed his studies in day school at Saint-Antoine Hospital (1920–1921), boarding school at Broca Hospital, finally qualifying as a doctor at the Pitié hospital (1921–1923), specialising in respiratory tract illnesses and aiding sick children in Paris, before opening his own practice.

=== From Action Française to La Cagoule ===
A member from 1914, in the 1920s he campaigned for Charles Maurras' royalist right-wing Action française. On 27 June 1923, he was sentenced to three months in prison and a 500 Fr. fine for an attack on statesman Maurice Viollette on 31 May by the Camelots du roi, the militant youth group of Action française popular with students; Maurras and two others were also imprisoned. He became general secretary of the federation of the Paris region of the Ligue d'Action française - an older organisation which was a recruitment and propaganda group for Action française; he combined this role with that of deputy secretary of the Ligue from June 1928, leading conferences and chairing private meetings.

In 1930, he was expelled from Action Française with another doctor, Paul Guérin (president of sections of the 18th arrondissement and former president of the northern suburbs federation). Martin had campaigned to become secretary general of the Camelots du roi but failed. He accused Pierre Lecœur - editor of a monarchist newspaper who relinquished the role of secretary general of Camelots du roi to become secretary general of Action Française - of being a police informer. The expulsion caused the departure of the Ligue president, Bernard de Vésins, followed by others, including brothers Claude Jeantet and Gabriel Jeantet. The clash of personalities illustrated different ideologies: Martin and Guerin criticised the Camelots du roi's inertia, wishing instead for a paramilitary organization capable of preparing a coup against the French Third Republic. He went to Brussels to see Jean d'Orleans, a pretender to the French throne, who had also distanced himself from Action française. There, with help from army intelligence colonel Elie de Froidemont, he was put in charge of security for d'Orleans' daughter, Isabelle, on the family's trips to Paris, even interviewing suitors to assess their honourability.

Martin took part in the 6 February 1934 crisis and led an action and documentation centre against agrarian Marxism within Henry Dorgères' Parti agraire et paysan [French Agrarian and Peasant Party], which aligned with the Front national. He advised Dorgères, who was also leader of the fascist-leaning Chemises vertes [Green Shirts] peasant movement. In 1935, he was one of the founders of a terrorist group, the Organisation secrète d'action révolutionnaire nationale [Secret Organisation of national revolutionary action] (Osarn), mis-labelled in the press as the C.S.A.R. and given the sardonic nickname of "La Cagoule" [balaclava or mask] by the director of the Camelots du roi, Maurice Pujo, because of its dissident Camelots members. It was led by Eugène Deloncle, who put Martin in charge of the 2nd Office - intelligence services - and his nickname was “'le Bib'”. He surveilled political enemies and collected data on them - a practice involving networking which was a notable feature of his life. A round-up targeted members of La Cagoule, but Martin escaped with the militant Jean Filiol, going into exile in Sanremo, Italy, with his wife and children. Following a pardon from prime minister Édouard Daladier, he returned to France to become a medical officer at Bicêtre Hospital.

=== Vichy France and the Resistance ===
After the Franco-Nazi armistice of 1940, he participated in Groupes de protection (GP), dependent on the Centre d'informations et d'études (CEI) of fr:François Métenier and colonel Georges Groussard. Supporting marshal Philippe Pétain, but hostile to collaboration, they spied on the Gestapo and Nazi military authorities, bringing together former cagoulards in the process. In December 1940, through Groussard, Martin was involved in the arrest and detention of Vichyist deputy prime minister Pierre Laval, who was considered too close to the Nazis by other collaborating politicians and who also irritated Pétain. Laval was released when Pétain backed down after the intervention of Nazi ambassador Otto Abetz, and the CEI and the GP were then officially dissolved.

Arrested in March 1942, Martin was transferred to Castres, Vals and then Évaux-les-Bains, where he met Jewish-born, homosexual, left-wing-associated writer Roger Stéphane. Martin cared for Stéphane's sick mother and another inmate while they were all incarcerated. Stéphane told Martin he considered him a friend, despite their marked differences in background and views; Martin said he would never forget. He escaped, became a maquisard of the "Roy" network, participated in the liberation of Lyon, and enlisted in the 7th Army of general Alexander Patch, undertaking several missions in Alsace and on the Rhine as "commander Bernard" between the 7th and the Office of Strategic Services.

=== Underground plots against the Fourth Republic ===
During the eventual Cagoule trial in 1948, Martin was sentenced to deportation; he went on the run again. He resumed his underground activities, this time against the French Fourth Republic and in support of French colonialism. He joined Pierre Poujade's right-wing Union de Défense des Commerçants et Artisans party. He created Le grande O, an organisation existing from 1954 to 1958. Martin was le grande V supported by generals Paul Cherrière (le grande A) and Lionel-Max Chassin (le grande B). They planned a coup d'état against the Fourth Republic. A Catholic, corporate state similar to Portugal's Estado Novo was their aim: Cherrière would foment a crisis in Algiers and take power, Chassin would take over the Saint-Étienne arms factory and seize control in Lyon, paratroopers leading an uprising of French Algerians would land in France and the Association des combattants de l’Union française (of which Chassin was a leader) would ensure strategic points were controlled. Martin was arrested by police at Saint-Lazare Métro station in Paris in June 1957; with a belief that he did not pose a threat to the regime, he was released provisionally in November.

After the first putsch in Algiers, of which he was one of the instigators, he joined the Mouvement populaire du 13-Mai party, founded by general Chassin. He wrote for its newspaper, Salut public de l'Algérie française, and advised its subsequent leader, Robert Martel, with whom he fell out. Close to the Organisation de l'armée secrète (OAS) at the onset of the French Fifth Republic, he was sought by police again for his participation in the semaine des barricades in Algiers in January 1960, and then for his role in the generals' putsch of 1961. After his arrest, and his trial in October 1963, he was sentenced by the Cour de sûreté de l'État [State Security Court] to 10 years' hard labour. He died on 5 June 1969 at the Bicêtre hospital, survived by his daughter Danièle de Villemarest.
