= Algeria in World War II =

Algeria during WW2
- 22 July 1940 – 8 May 1945
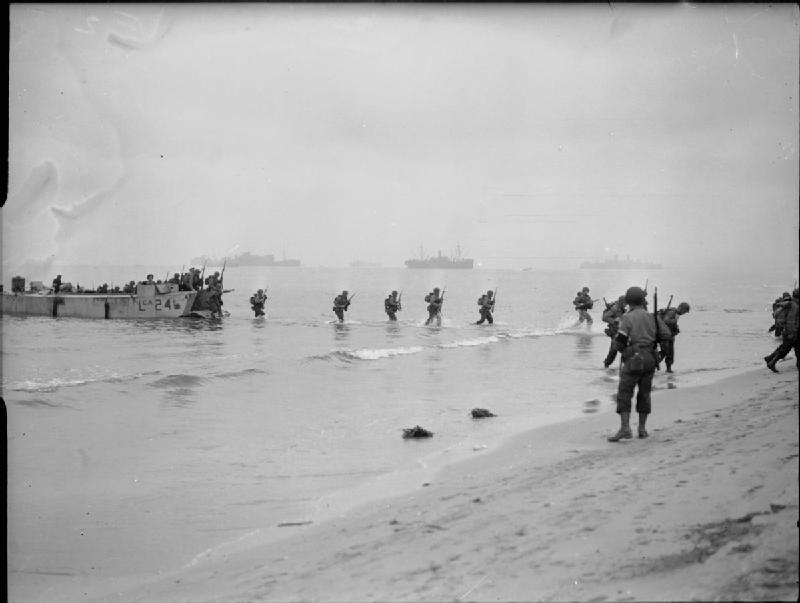
- Landing of Oran (November 1942)
- Location: Algeria

At the beginning of World War 2, Algeria was formally part of the French Republic.

== Introduction ==
=== Political context ===
The north is made up of several departments, the south of the southern territories.

At the time of the armistice of 1940, Algeria, colonized by France, was administratively dependent on the Vichy regime.

=== Algerian Political Parties Stance on WW2 ===
In 1939, the state of French politics in Algeria proved ineffective, failing to address critical issues. Economic instability loomed large, with the specter of famine looming, while calls for equal rights from patriots went unheeded. Attempts to revoke draconian laws fell on deaf ears in the French Parliament, and even proposed reforms like the Blum Viollette proposal faltered. Consequently, tensions escalated, leading to the dissolution of the Algerian Communist Party. Furthermore, the Association of Algerian Muslim Ulema declined to support France in the war. Moreover, the establishment of the North African Revolutionary Committee by People's Party militants exacerbated the situation. This committee, aligned with the Nazis, advocated for Algerian collaboration with the Nazis to expel France from Algeria. Consequently, a significant number of Algerian militants were swayed to join the Nazi cause against France. As a result, France closed the Algerian People's Party in September 1939.

==== People's Party ====
Prior to the outbreak of World War II, the People's Party had already been shuttered, with 28 of its leaders apprehended on October 4, 1939. However, following the Vichy regime's acquisition of Algeria subsequent to the Battle of France, the party was reinstated. The People's Party was once again closed in May 1945, following a significant demonstration in Algiers involving 20,000 protestors.

==== Association of Algerian Muslim Ulema ====
During the war, the Association of Muslim Ulema refused any cooperation with France. However, the passing of Abdelhamid ibn Badis while under house arrest left the association in need of new leadership, leading to Bashir Al Ibrahimi's ascension. While the allegiance of the association during World War II remains uncertain, they may have adopted a neutral stance.

==== Algerian Communist Party ====
The Algerian Communist Party, akin to the People's Party, was disbanded prior to the war on September 26, 1939, largely due to ongoing French oppression in Algeria. Additionally, it harbored a rivalry with the People's Party, viewing it as a similar entity vying for political dominance. However, unlike its counterpart, the Algerian Communist Party held a favorable stance toward the Soviet Union, and played a pivotal role in expelling the Vichy regime from Algeria. Consequently, the Algerian Communist Party aligned itself with the Allies.

== Beginning of WW2 ==
=== Phoney War ===
On 1 September 1939, there were 16 regiments of Algerian tirailleurs. 8 regiments were stationed in North Africa, 8 in the mainland.

On 1 March 1940, the number of Maghreb troops assigned to the army was 70,000 in the metropolitan area.

In Algeria, three regiments based on reservists are formed: in the department of Algiers, the 17th RTA; in the department of Oran, the 18th RTA; in the department of Constantine, the 19th RTA.

Three Algerian battalions stationed in Morocco are integrated into the 29th RTA.

On 10 May 1940, 14 Algerian regiments are present in the French Metropolis.

=== Battle of France ===
Several units of Algerian tirailleurs participate in the defense of the Loire at Saumur.

=== Armistice ===
Algeria passed under the authority of Vichy France.

== Under Vichy ==
=== Conditions of Algeria under Vichy ===
After the Battle of France and the armistice of 22 June 1940, it was taken by Vichy France under the control of Nazi Germany.

On June 22, 1940, Marshall Petain signed an armistice with Nazi Germany, Relocating to the South of France, while keeping Algeria and the rest of North Africa with Charles de Gaulle continuing the war through overseas territories pushing the British Empire to Attack Mers El Kebir shortly after, that was condemened by France as a rupture between both countries. According to Benjamin Stora, who had a Jewish Algerian grandfather, Jews lost the right to work, on many different aspects, press, military, even sometimes having their properties stolen, with their children losing the right to education and basic needs. No matter how hard the Vichy Regime tried to separate the Jews and Muslims they failed to do so.

By taking away the rights of Jews, you are not granting any new rights to Muslims. The equality you have achieved between Jews and Muslims is an equality in degradation

— Messali Hadj,

Overall, the Algerian population held a negative view of the Vichy regime. Additionally, following the revocation of the Crémieux Decree on October 7, 1940, they provided assistance to Algerian Jews. Furthermore, Algerian Jews held fierce resistance against Vichy France mainly in 1942 with the Takeover of Algiers, Despite the reconquest, France couldn't reinstate Jewish citizenship until 1943, considering it a minor issue in comparison to the military conflicts with the Axis powers, Jewish resistance in Algeria extended beyond military actions to include education. In 1941, a group comprising Algerian Muslims and Jews collaborated to establish a university. Unfortunately, by the end of the same year, the university was dissolved.

=== Algerian resistance against Germany ===
==== Djaafar Khemdoudi ====
Djaafar Khemdoudi (Arabic: جَعْفَر خَمْدُودِي), also known as Jean Djaafar Khemdoudi, was born on November 12, 1917, in Sour El Ghozlane in the Bouira province and died on July 26, 2011. He was an Algerian resistance fighter during World War II. Through his actions, he saved numerous individuals who resisted forced labor under the Service du Travail Obligatoire (STO) and rescued Jews in Saint-Fons and Vénissieux. Deported to the Neuengamme concentration camp, then to Malchow and Ravensbrück, he managed to survive and eventually return to France. Djaafar Khemdoudi died in 2011 .

==== Kaddour Benghabrit ====
During World War II, Kaddour Benghabrit has saved the lives of around a hundred Jews, including the singer Salim Halali, by having the mosque's administrative staff issue them Muslim identity certificates. These documents enabled them to evade arrest and deportation.

In a 29-minute documentary titled The Paris Mosque: A Forgotten Resistance, produced for the Racines program on France 3 in 1991, Derri Berkani reported that members of the Francs-Tireurs et Partisans (FTP) of Algerian origin—mostly workers—brought Jews to the Paris Mosque to protect them. These Algerian FTP members were tasked with rescuing and sheltering British parachutists, providing them with safe havens. Later, they extended their efforts to assist Jewish families—those they knew personally or were referred to by friends—by sheltering them at the mosque. While there, the families awaited documents that would allow them to travel to free zones or cross the Mediterranean to reach North Africa.

The exact number of Jews sheltered and saved by the Paris Mosque during this period varies depending on the source. Annie-Paule Derczansky, president of the Bâtisseuses de Paix association, notes that Albert Assouline, who testified in Berkani's film, claimed that 1,600 people were saved. In contrast, Alain Boyer, a former official in charge of religious affairs at the French Ministry of the Interior, estimated the figure to be closer to 500.

An appeal for testimonies from Jews saved by the Paris Mosque between 1942 and 1944 was launched on April 3, 2005, to support the awarding of the Righteous Among the Nations medal by Yad Vashem to the descendants of Kaddour Benghabrit.

=== Algerian collaborators with Germany ===
==== Saïd Mohammedi ====
One of the most Notable Algerian collaborators was Saïd Mohammedi who at the start served the French army, before becoming intensenly nationalistic, becoming a North African Star Activist, and joining Al Husseini to collaborate with Nazi Germany and Fascist Italy, before being arrested in 1944 by French authorities in Tebessa. After the war, he became a FLN soldier and helped with the Liberation of Algeria.

==== Muhammed Al-Maadi ====
Muhammad al-Maadi was an Algerian Gestapo member who supported and collaborated with Vichy and Germany who encouraged Muslim anti-Semitism, and was a part of the Revolutionary Social Movement. After the defeat of Germany, he hid with his wife in Germany, before getting into contact with Al Husseini who helped him flee to Egypt. He died of throat cancer in 1954 or 1957.

== Military operations in Algeria ==
On November 8, 1942, The Allies led by Eisenhower landed into West North Africa (Morocco and Algeria) with the American navy attacking two ports in Algeria, Mers El Kebir and Algiers.

=== Naval Operations ===
During Operation Torch the Allies were assisted by local Jewish Algerian Resistance.

==== Oran ====
The Center Task Force faced challenges during the landings on three beaches near Oran. Delays occurred at the westernmost beach due to a French convoy interrupting mine-clearing efforts. Unexpected shallowness and sandbars caused confusion and damage to landing ships, as reconnaissance of maritime conditions had not been conducted beforehand. This highlighted the importance of pre-invasion reconnaissance for future operations, like Operation Overlord, The U.S. 1st Ranger Battalion landed east of Oran, capturing the shore battery at Arzew swiftly. An attempt to directly land U.S. infantry at the harbor to prevent destruction failed, with the French vessels destroying two Allied sloops. The Vichy French naval fleet left the harbor and attacked the Allied fleet, resulting in the sinking or grounding of all its ships.

==== Algiers ====
On November 8, 1942, the invasion of Algiers began with landings on three beaches—two west and one east. Major-General Charles W. Ryder commanded the landing forces, which included the British 78th Infantry Division's 11th Brigade Group and the US 34th Infantry Division's 168th and 39th Regimental Combat Teams. British 78th Infantry Division's 36th Brigade Group remained in reserve. Despite some landings going astray, the lack of French opposition rendered this inconsequential. Coastal batteries had been neutralized by the French Resistance, and one French commander switched allegiance to the Allies. The only conflict occurred in the port of Algiers during Operation Terminal, where two British destroyers aimed to prevent the French from destroying port facilities and ships. Heavy artillery fire hindered one destroyer, but the other managed to land 250 Rangers before being forced back to sea.

== Post-operation Torch ==
The French government relocated to Algiers in 1943 and remained there until Liberation. The French North Africa provided a logistical "springboard" for the Allies in operations against the Axis in Tunisia, Sicily, Italy in 1943, and Provence in 1944.

In the vast expanses of Africa, France could indeed rebuild its army and sovereignty while awaiting the entry of new allies, alongside the old ones, to tip the balance of power. However, Africa within reach of the Italian, Balkan, and Spanish peninsulas would provide an excellent springboard back into Europe, which would happen to be French.

— Charles De Gaulle, Memoires of De Gaulle Charles,

=== May 8, 1945 ===
On May 8, 1945, Algerians marked Germany's surrender by proudly waving their newly adopted nationalist flags. In Setif, around 5,000 people joined in the celebration. However, the French gendarmerie reacted negatively, harassing Algerians and attempting to seize their nationalist flags. Following the initial confrontation, violence escalated as shots were fired, though it remains unclear who instigated the gunfire. Both police and protesters were injured or killed in the ensuing chaos. In Guelma, similar protests were met with violent suppression. After this, armed groups in Setif and the surrounding countryside attacked Pied-Noirs settlers killing 102 Pied-Noirs. In retaliation, the French colonial authorities and settler militias massacred thousands of Algerian Muslims in the area, with estimates ranging from 3,000 to as high as 45,000.
