= Henry Charbonneau =

French politician and writer

Henry Charbonneau (pseudonym: Henry Charneau) (12 December 1913 in Saint-Maixent-l'École, Deux-Sèvres – 2 January 1983 in La Roche-sur-Yon) was a French far right politician and writer.

The son of a soldier, Charbonneau initially came to political activism as a member of the Action Française before embarking on a varied career with a number of far right groups. A close associate of Jean Filliol, he followed him into the Camelots du Roi militia group before, in 1930, becoming the co-editor of the journal La France Ouvrière with Henry Coston. His next stop in 1932 was the Ligue des Contribuables, one of the Far right leagues that, with its anti-tax message, pre-empted the later Poujadist movement. He then became a supporter of Eugène Deloncle and in 1937 joined La Cagoule.

Charbonneau dropped out of politics in 1939 when he enlisted in the 1st Regiment of Zouaves. He returned to France in 1941 and joined Deloncle's Mouvement Social Révolutionnaire and soon became a member of the Filiol tendency that turned against Deloncle in 1942. Losing interest in the group, he enlisted in Milice, which was commanded by his uncle by marriage Joseph Darnand and took over editing duties on their journal Combats. The journal appeared weekly, initially in Vichy and then in Paris. Despite this Charbonneau was not overly enthusiastic about the existence of the Milice, and encouraged members to enlist in the Waffen-SS and serve on then Eastern Front. He fled to Germany in 1944 and from his base in Berlin he served the Nazi Party as a propagandist before fleeing first to Milan and finally to Switzerland from where he was extradited to France.

Charbonneau spent a while in prison for collaborationism but returned to writing upon his release, with his material featuring in a number of far right journals. In his later years he was a member of both Ordre Nouveau and Parti des forces nouvelles.
