= Jeantet =

Jeantet (French pronunciation: [ʒɑ̃tɛ]) is a French surname that may refer to

- Claude Jeantet (1902–1982), French journalist and far right politician
- Gabriel Jeantet (1906–1978), French far right activist and journalist, brother of Claude
- Louis Jeantet (1897–1981), French businessman
  - Louis-Jeantet Foundation
  - Louis-Jeantet Prize for Medicine
