= Raymond Abellio =

French writer (1907–1986)

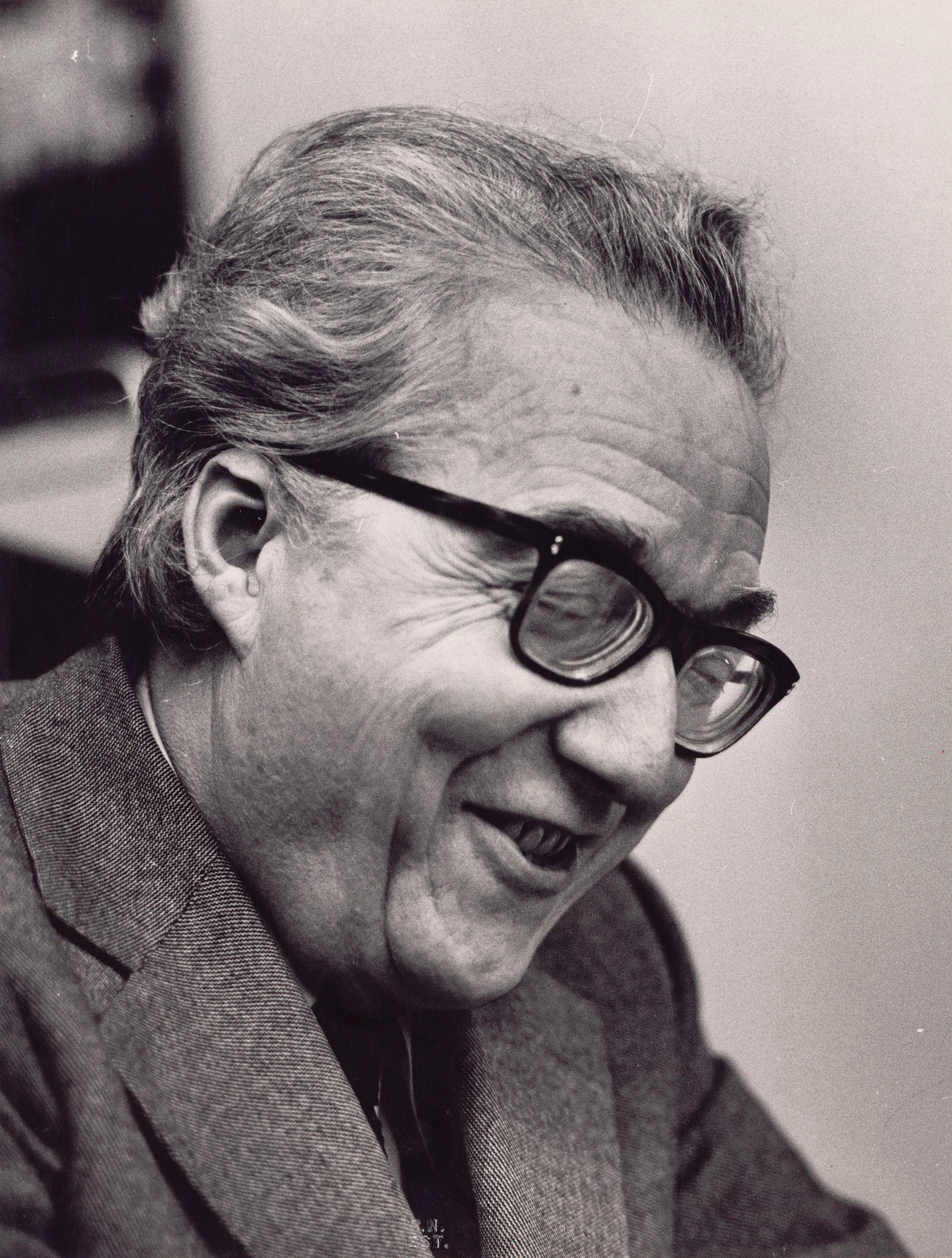
- Born: Georges Soulès; 11 November 1907; Toulouse, France
- Died: 26 August 1986 (aged 78); Nice, France
- Resting place: Cimetière d'Auteuil, Paris, France
- Education: École Polytechnique
- Occupations: Novelist, essayist, philosopher
- Writing career
- Notable awards: Prix Sainte-Beuve (1946); Prix des Deux Magots (1980)

Georges Soulès (11 November 1907 – 26 August 1986), known by his pen name Raymond Abellio, was a French writer.

== Life ==
Abellio was born in Toulouse and attended courses at the École Polytechnique. He later joined the X-Crise Group. He advocated far-left ideas, but like many other technocrats, he joined the Vichy regime during the Second World War and became in 1942 secretary general of Eugène Deloncle's far-right Mouvement Social Révolutionnaire (MSR) party. He then participated in Marcel Déat's attempt of creating a unified Collaborationist party. In April and September 1943 he participated in the Days of the Mont-Dore, an assembly of collaborationist personalities under the patronage of Philippe Pétain. After the Liberation, he was sentenced to 20 years imprisonment in absentia for Collaborationism, and escaped to Switzerland. However, he was pardoned in 1952 and went on to start a literary career.

Besides his literary career, under the influence of Pierre de Combas, he developed an interest in esoterism, and especially astrology. He was also interested in the possibility of a secret numerical code in the Bible, a subject that he developed in La Bible, document chiffré in 1950, and later in Introduction à une théorie des nombres bibliques, in 1984. He proposed in particular that the number of the beast, 666, was the key number of life, a manifestation of the holy trinity on all possible levels, material, animist and spiritual. He has also written on the philosophy of rugby football.

Beginning in 1974 he edited the Recherches avancées book series for Fayard.

== Bibliography ==
- Os Olhos de Ezequiel Estão Abertos ISBN 978-9725686294
- La fosse de babel

== Works ==
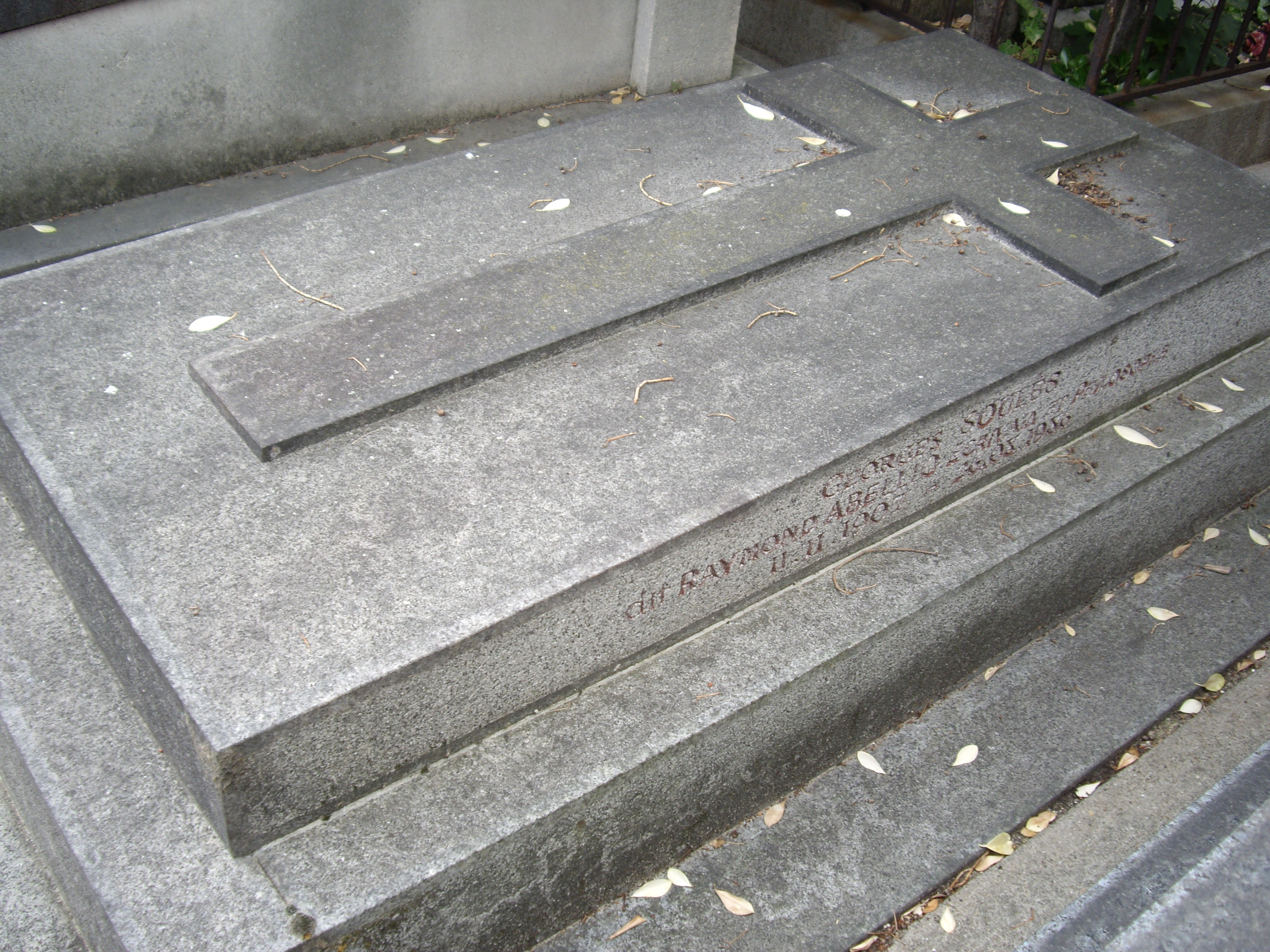
Grave of Raymond Abellio in cimetière d'Auteuil.

- with André Mahé La Fin du nihilisme - 1943 (signed under his actual name, Georges Soulès)
- Heureux les pacifiques - 1946
- Les yeux d'Ézéchiel sont ouverts - 1949
- Vers un nouveau prophétisme : essai sur le rôle politique du sacré et la situation de Lucifer dans le monde moderne - 1950
- La Bible, document chiffré : essai sur la restitution des clefs de la science numérale secrète. Tome 1. Clefs générales - 1950
- La Bible, document chiffré : essai sur la restitution des clefs de la science numérale secrète. Tome 2. Les Séphiroth et les 5 premiers versets de la Genèse - 1950
- Assomption de l'Europe -1954
- with Paul Sérant Au seuil de l'ésotérisme : précédé de : l'Esprit moderne et la tradition - 1955
- La fosse de Babel - 1962
- La Structure absolue - 1965
- Hommages à Robert Brasillach - 1965
- Guénon, oui. Mais... in Planète n°15, April 1970
- La Fin de l'Ésotérisme - 1973
- Sol Invictus - 1981 (winner of the Prix des Deux-Magots)
- Montségur - 1982
- Visages immobiles - 1983
- Introduction à une théorie des nombres bibliques - 1984
- Manifeste de la nouvelle Gnose - 1989 (edited by Marie-Thérèse de Brosses and Charles Hirsch)
- Fondements d'éthique - 1994
