= Agoudas Hakehilos Synagogue =

Orthodox synagogue in Paris, France

- Hebrew: אֲגֻדָּת־הַקְּהִלּוֹת
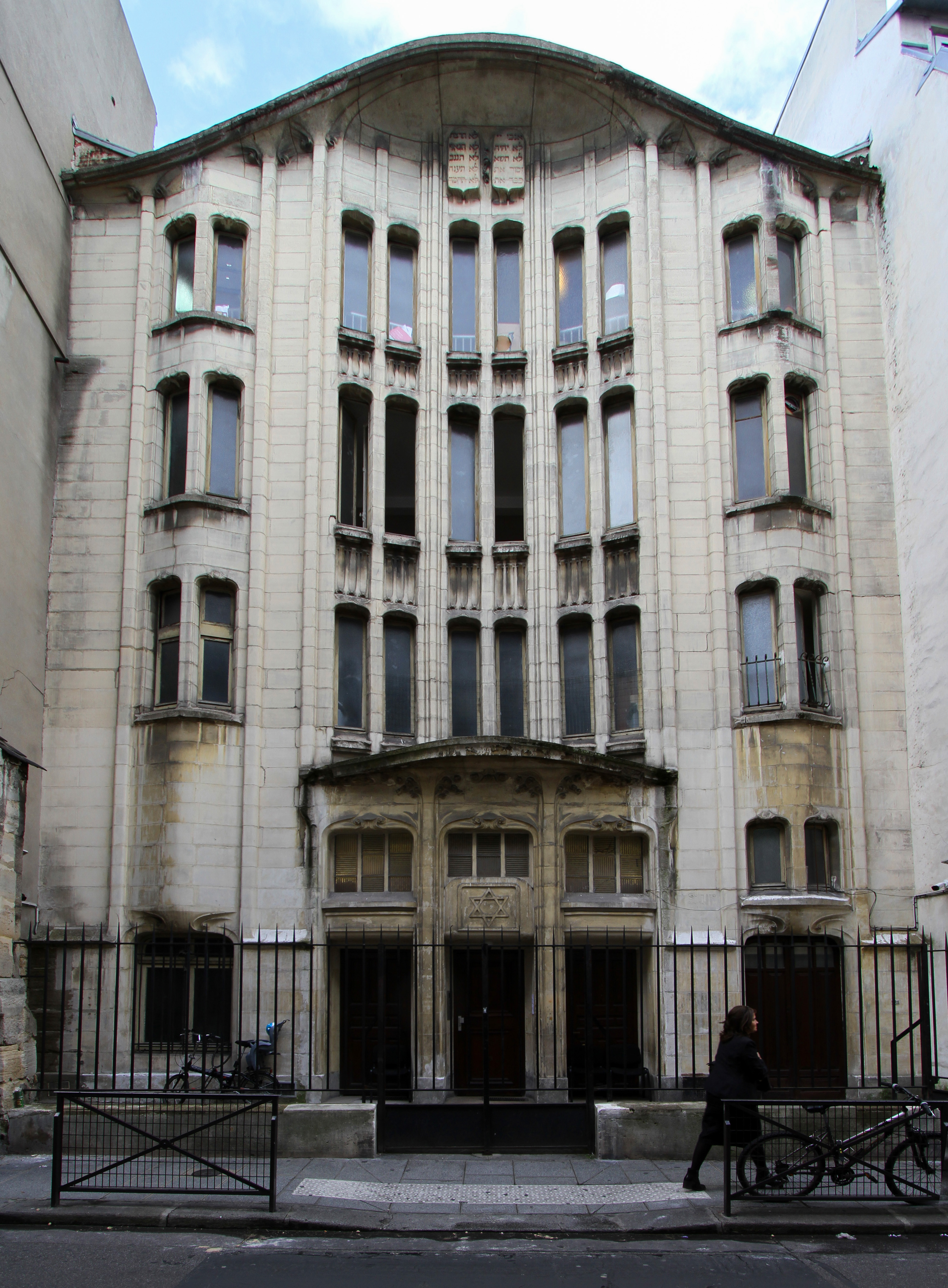
- The synagogue in 2017

- Location of the synagogue in Paris

Religion
- Affiliation: Orthodox Judaism
- Rite: Nusach Ashkenaz
- Ecclesiastical or organizational status: Synagogue
- Leadership: Rav Mordechaï Rottenberg
- Status: Active

Location
- Location: Rue Pavée, 10, Le Marais, IVe arrondissement, Paris
- Country: France
- Interactive map of Agoudas Hakehilos Synagogue
- Coordinates: 48°51′21″N 2°21′38″E

Architecture
- Architect: Hector Guimard
- Type: Synagogue architecture
- Style: Art Nouveau
- Groundbreaking: 1913
- Completed: 1914

Specifications
- Height (max): 12 metres (39 ft)
- Materials: Reinforced concrete; stone

Website
- pavee.fr

Monument historique
- Official name: Synagogue
- Type: Base Mérimée
- Designated: July 4, 1989
- Reference no.: PA00086477

The Agoudas Hakehilos Synagogue (Hebrew: אֲגֻדָּת־הַקְּהִלּוֹת, lit. 'Union of the communities') is an Orthodox Jewish congregation and synagogue, located at 10 rue Pavée, in Le Marais quarter, in the IVe arrondissement of Paris, France. The synagogue is commonly referred to as the Pavée synagogue, rue Pavée synagogue, or Guimard synagogue, and was completed in 1914, designed by Hector Guimard in the Art Nouveau style. The congregation worships in the Ashzenazi rite, led by Rav Moredekhai Rottenberg, the son of the late Rav Haim Yaakov Rottenberg, known as the Rouv. The synagogue is open to the public.

== History ==
The synagogue was commissioned by the Agoudas Hakehilos (אֲגֻדָּת־הַקְּהִלּוֹת, union of the communities), society composed of Orthodox Jews of primarily Russian origin, headed by Joseph Landau. Its erection is a testament to the massive wave of immigration from Eastern Europe that took place at the turn of the 20th century. Funded by this wealthy Polish-Russian group it did not cost the Parisian community a centime. They intended to provide a spacious and modernized place for Jews accustomed to the intimate and often squalid shtiblakh.

The construction of the synagogue started in 1913 and was completed the following year, with the official inauguration taking place on June 7, 1914; nevertheless the Synagogue had been already active for services since October 1913. The opening ceremony was not attended by any of the representants of the Central Consistory, instead famous polish Hazzan Gershon Sirota was present at the event.

During 1934 a gas explosion destroyed the main hall, rebuilt shortly thereafter. On the evening of Yom Kippur in 1941, the building was dynamited along with six other Parisian synagogues by collaborators of the Nazi occupants; however the bomb did not go off and the building was preserved. On the night between 2 and 3 October of the same year, the synagogue was damaged following an attack organised by far-right association Mouvement Social Révolutionnaire. It was partially restored afterwards, but the main entrance was altered from its original appearance.

The building was registered as a monument historique by the French authorities on July 4, 1989.

== Description ==
The synagogue is Guimard's last major project before World War I and the only religious building he designed. Built on a narrow stripe of land between older houses, the synagogue is developed in height, with the elongated windows and continuous columns of its façade emphasizing its verticality. The interior is vertically arranged as well, with two levels of galleries on each side of the nave, to deal with the lack of width. The synagogue also features Art Nouveau elements such as asymmetrical forms and floral motifs in its façade and interior fittings.

Guimard made use of reinforced concrete for the structure and for the exterior he chose white stone. Light enters through a number of windows in the façade, but much of the natural lighting is provided by the large glass window of the back wall. Skylights originally were also present, but were covered when the roof was renovated; they are still visible from the interior.

The furnishings (luminaires, chandeliers, brackets, and benches) as well as the stylized vegetal decorations made of staff and the cast iron railings are all creations of Guimard and they display the same motifs that characterize the exteriors. The triangle is a recurring symbol in the ornamentation and triangles were also present over the entrances, but were substituted by a single Star of David during a restoration of the façade.

== Gallery ==
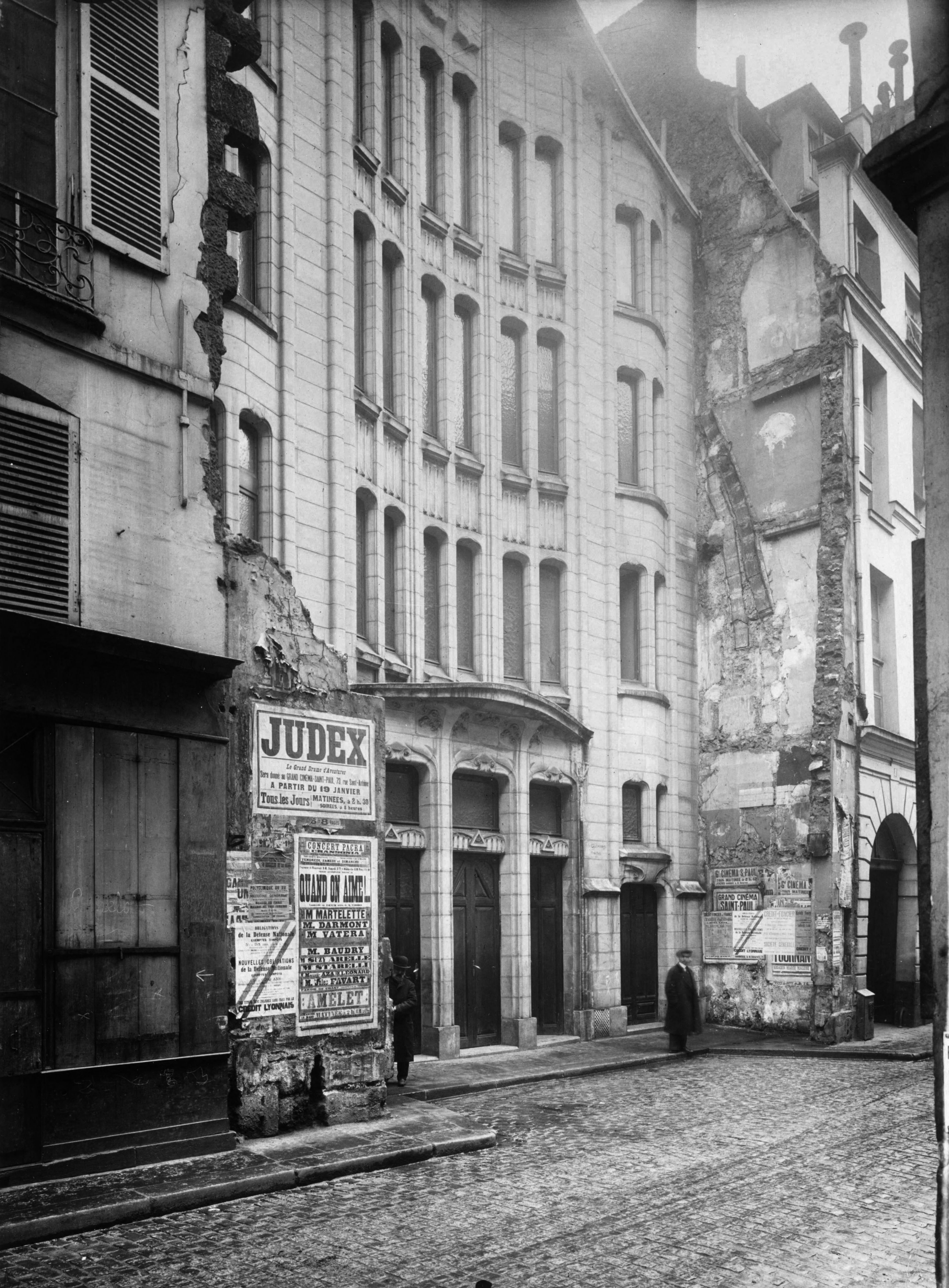
The synagogue in 1917, three years after its completion

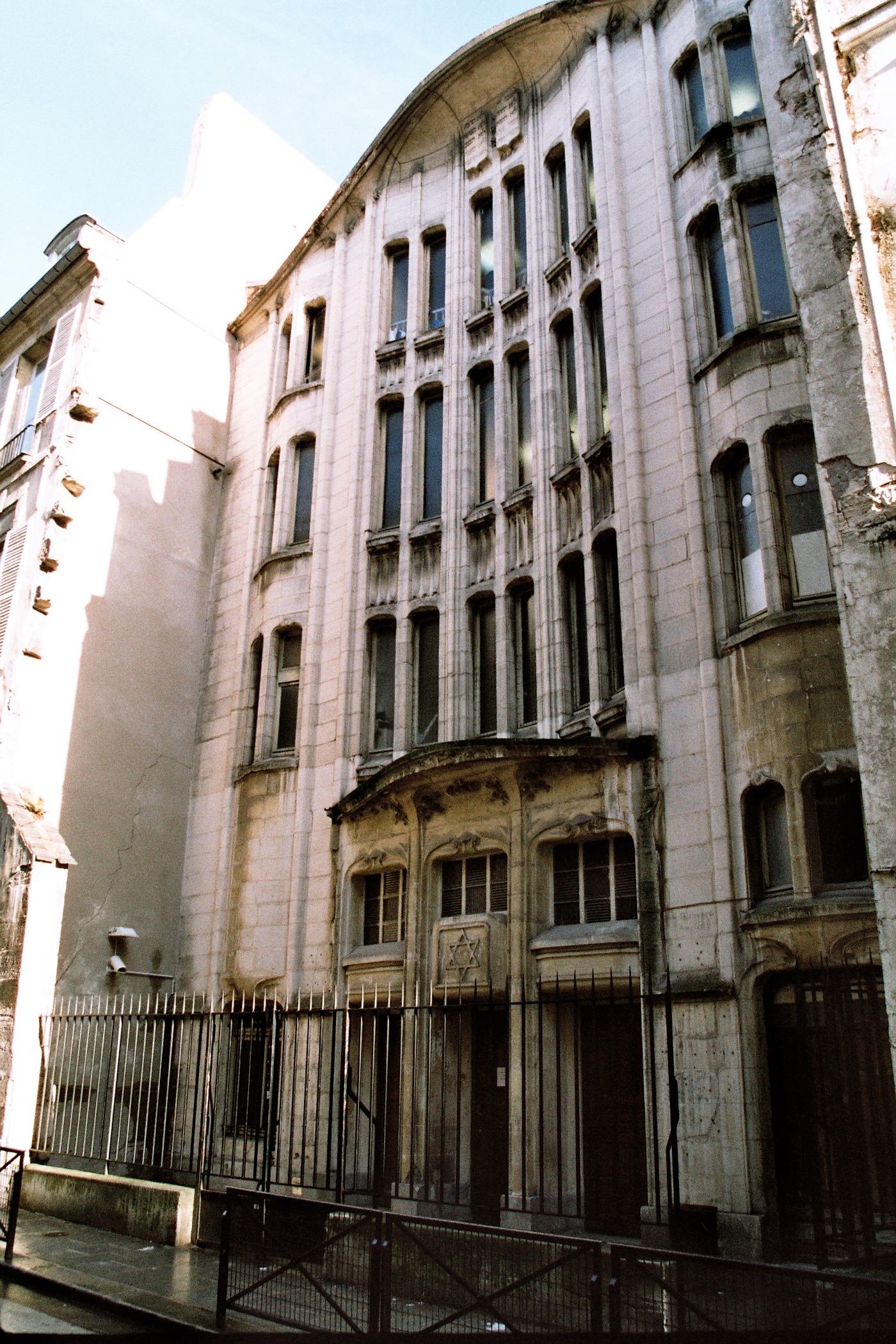
Street view from Rue Pavée

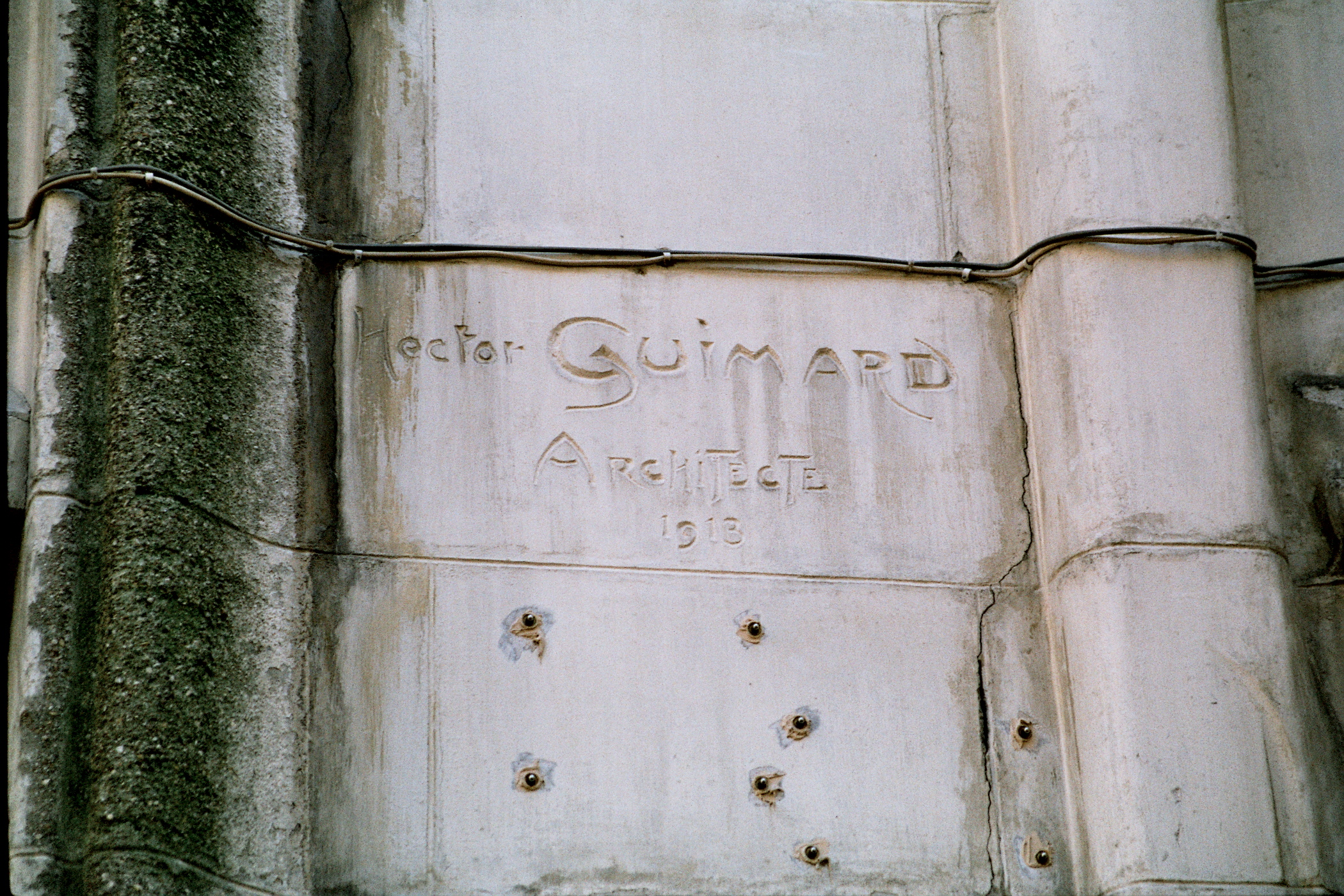
Stone with inscription: "Hector Guimard, Architect, 1913"

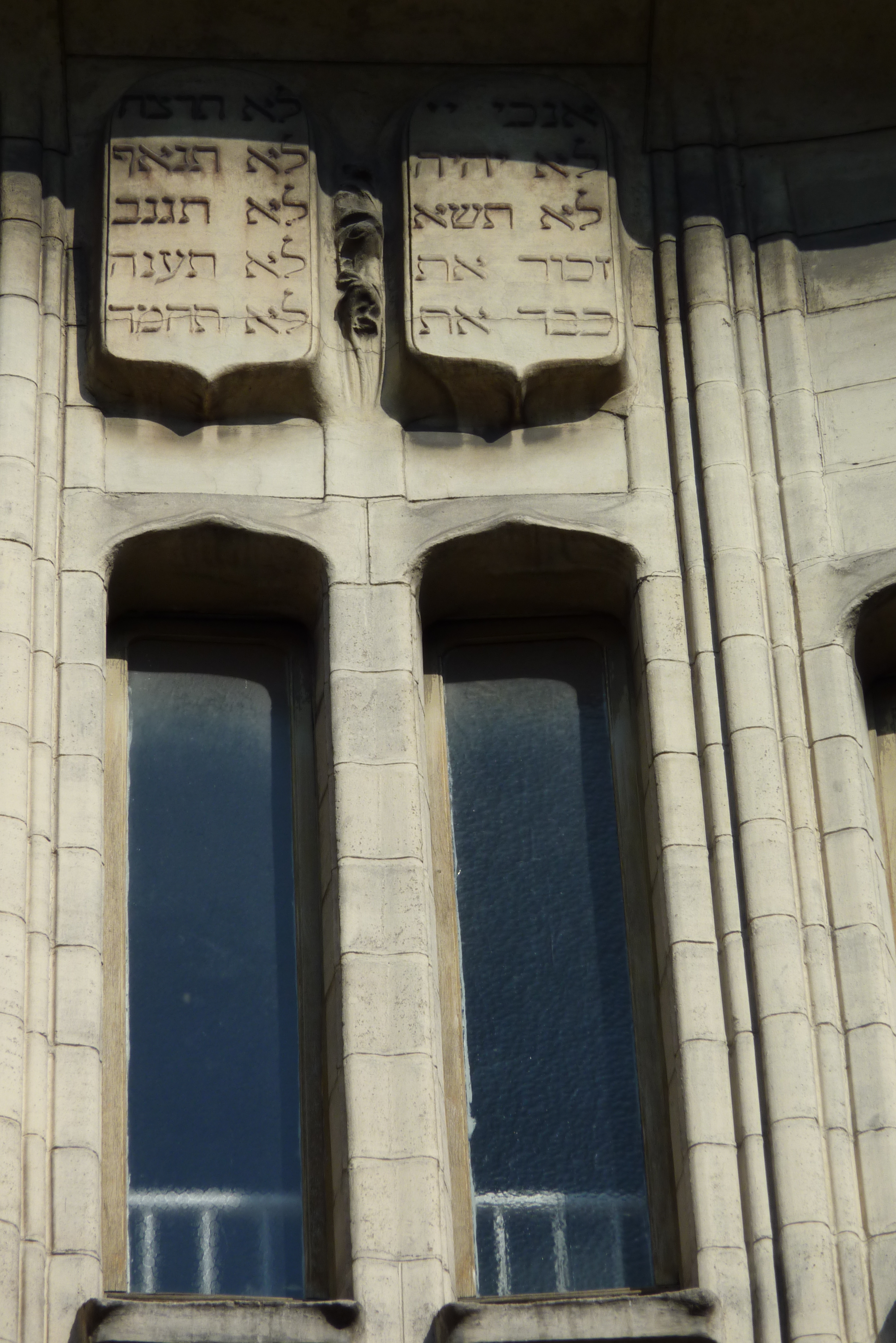
Detail of the façade decoration, with the Tables of the Law

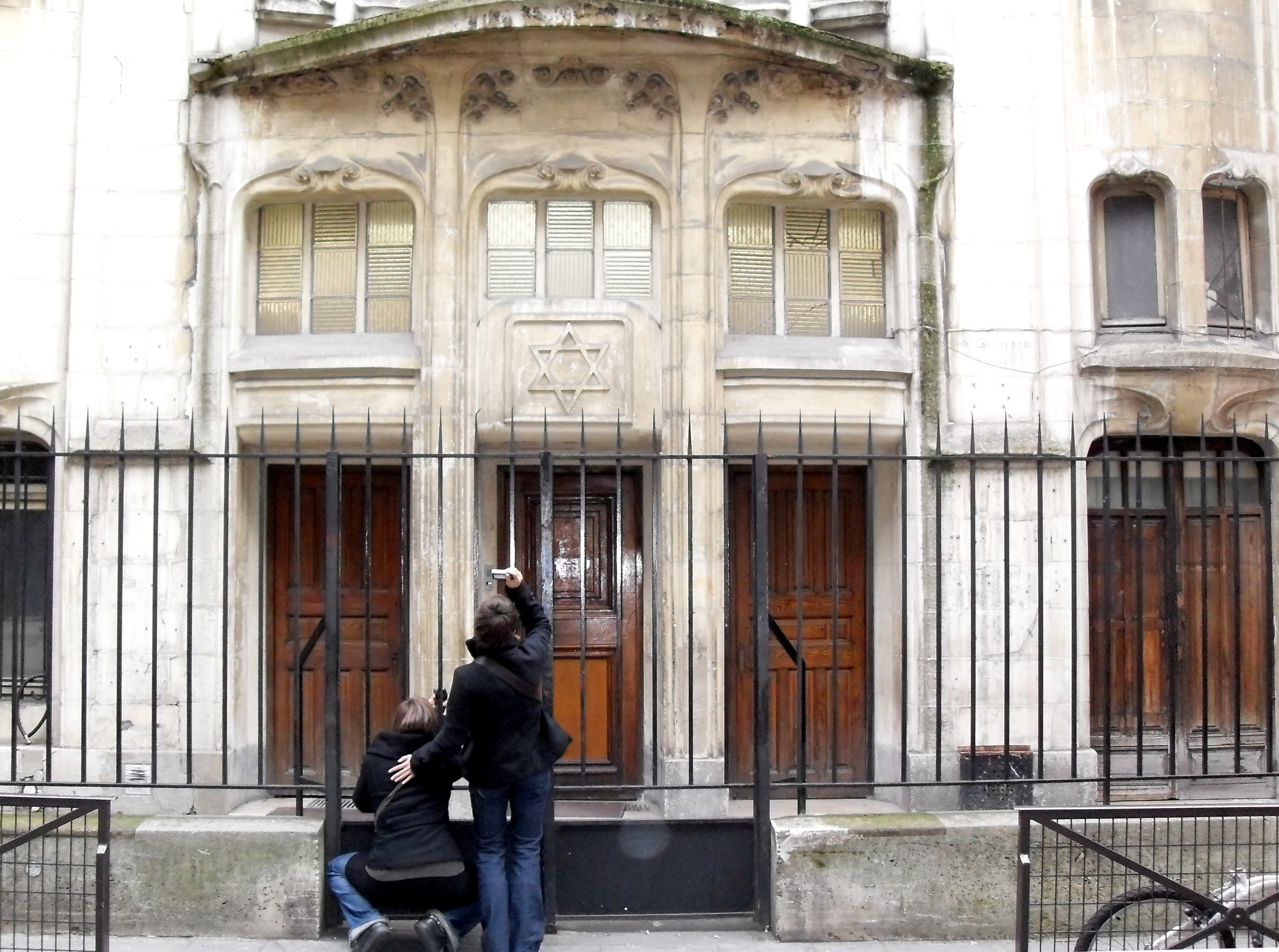
Detail of the entrance, with the Star of David

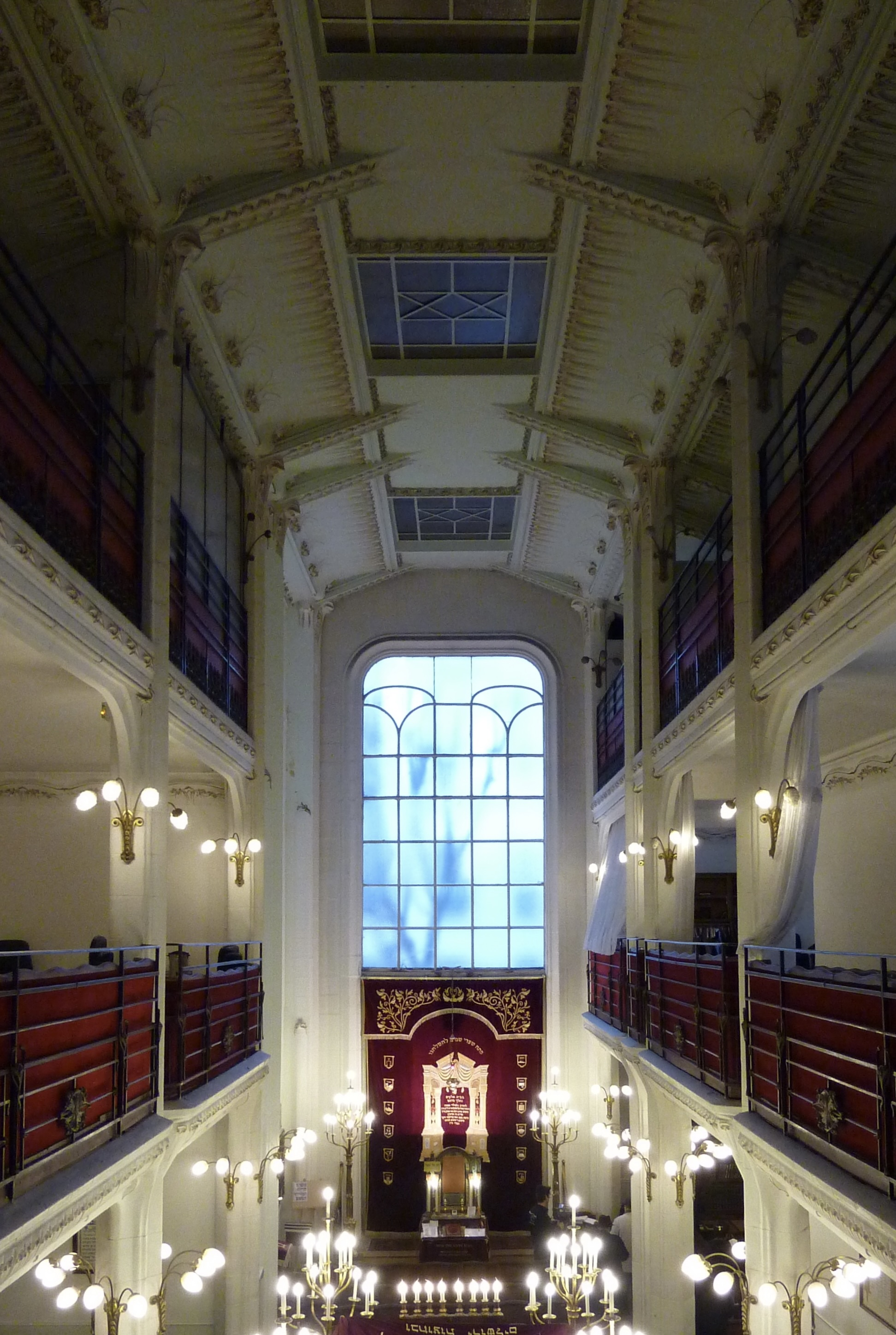
Interior view, showing the nave, the galleries and the back wall

== See also ==
- History of the Jews in France
- List of synagogues in France
