= Dimitri Navachine =

Russian politician and economist (1889–1937)

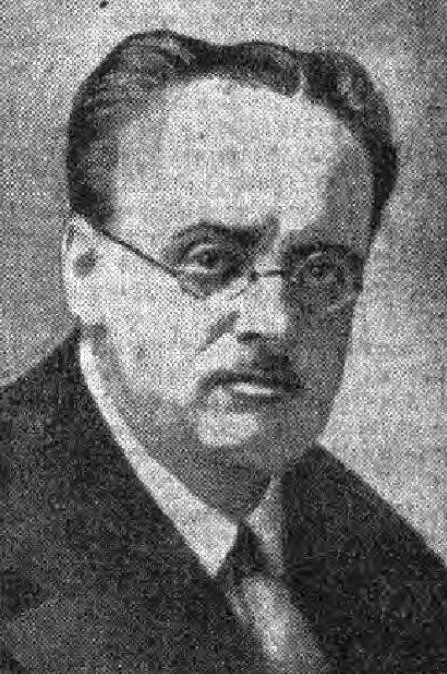
Dimitri Navachine, circa 1936

Dimitri Navachine (Дмитрий Сергеевич Навашин; 30 August 1889 – 25 January 1937) was a Russian politician and economist. He governed the BCEN-Eurobank in France from 1927 to 1929. In addition, he served as a consultant to the French Popular Front to offer advice on combating the economic crisis in France. Ideologically, Navachine was a socialist but his politics and theories were more closely associated with the Popular Front, not Marxism–Leninism. Although well-respected for his economic views in France, Navachine nonetheless created many enemies both there and in the Soviet Union. He was assassinated in 1937 but his case still remains unsolved.

== Biography ==
Dimitri Navachine was born in Moscow on 30 August 1889. After the February Revolution in 1917, he was assigned to the vice presidency of the Red Cross under Alexander Kerensky's newly formed Russian Provisional Government to oversee the treatment of German prisoners during World War I. Perhaps due to his experience with economics and his invaluable connections in the West, Navachine managed to stay in good favour with the Communist Party when it seized power late in 1917, despite being a Kerensky supporter. At first critical of the new government, Navachine nonetheless assisted with restoring the country's economy, devastated by war and revolution. The Soviets' first important assignment for Navachine was to send him to Spain in 1921; as a diplomat, Navachine negotiated with Spain to exchange its petroleum reserves with the Soviet Union rather than Royal Dutch Shell.

In 1927, Navachine was assigned to Paris to assume the directorship of BCEN Eurobank which was responsible for the Soviet Union's financial matters in France. He resigned from the position in 1929 and either worked for or with a group of right-wing bankers connected to the Banque Worms. After Joseph Stalin's rise to power, Navachine elected to remain in France, advising the French Popular Front, a political party that shared his ideological views, during France's economic crisis in the 1930s. Léon Blum's economic minister Charles Spinasse collaborated closely with Navachine who also published a two-volume study on the issue. Well-respected for his input, Navachine counselled Spinasse to disband the industrial cartels in France.

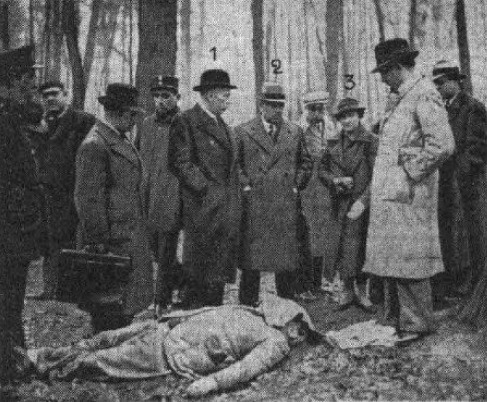
Navachine assassinated on 25 January 1937

Some historians insist, despite claims by Navachine that he cut ties with the Soviet Union in 1929, he engaged in espionage on behalf of the Soviet government. French detectives, however, could find no evidence of him engaging in acts of espionage beyond the early 1930s. By 1937, having already declined a summons to return to Moscow, Navachine was faced with open hostility from Soviet agents. Worse still, he created enemies with anti-Semitic groups who were aware of his counsel in final political parties.

== Assassination ==
On the morning of 25 January 1937, while walking his Fox Terrier dog in Bois de Boulogne, Navachine was assassinated, stabbed to death in an incident still unsolved by French police; he was 47 years of age. His assassination has been connected to at least three other murders carried out during a state of ongoing violence in France: Italian anti-fascist dissidents Carlo and Nello Rosselli, and undercover agent Laetitia Nourrissat Toureaux. Panteleimon Takhchiyanov, an officer of the NKVD, is suspected to have carried out Navachine's assassination, possibly to silence him before he released evidence proving the innocence of Soviet political prisoners. Another theory argues his attack was coordinated by the fascist extremist group La Cagoule to create fears of Communist conspirators in France.

His remains are interred at Montrouge Cemetery.

== See also ==
- List of unsolved deaths

== Sources ==
- Brunelle, Gayle K. (2010). Murder in the Métro: Laetitia Toureaux and the Cagoule in 1930s France. LSU Press. ISBN 978-0-8071-3735-2.
- Passmore, Kevin (16 July 2015). Political Violence and Democracy in Western Europe, 1918-1940. Springer. ISBN 978-1-137-51595-7.
- Time & Tide (March 1954). Time & Tide. Time and Tide Publishing Company. "This was Leon Trotsky's comment: 'Dimitri Navachine knew too much about the Moscow Trials. Recently the agents of the GPU (now MVD — the organization to which Khokhlov belonged) have stolen my archives in Paris. Today, they have killed Navachine.'"
