= Synagogue des Tournelles =

Synagogue in Tournelles, France

Synagogue Tournelles
- French: Synagogue de la rue des Tournelles
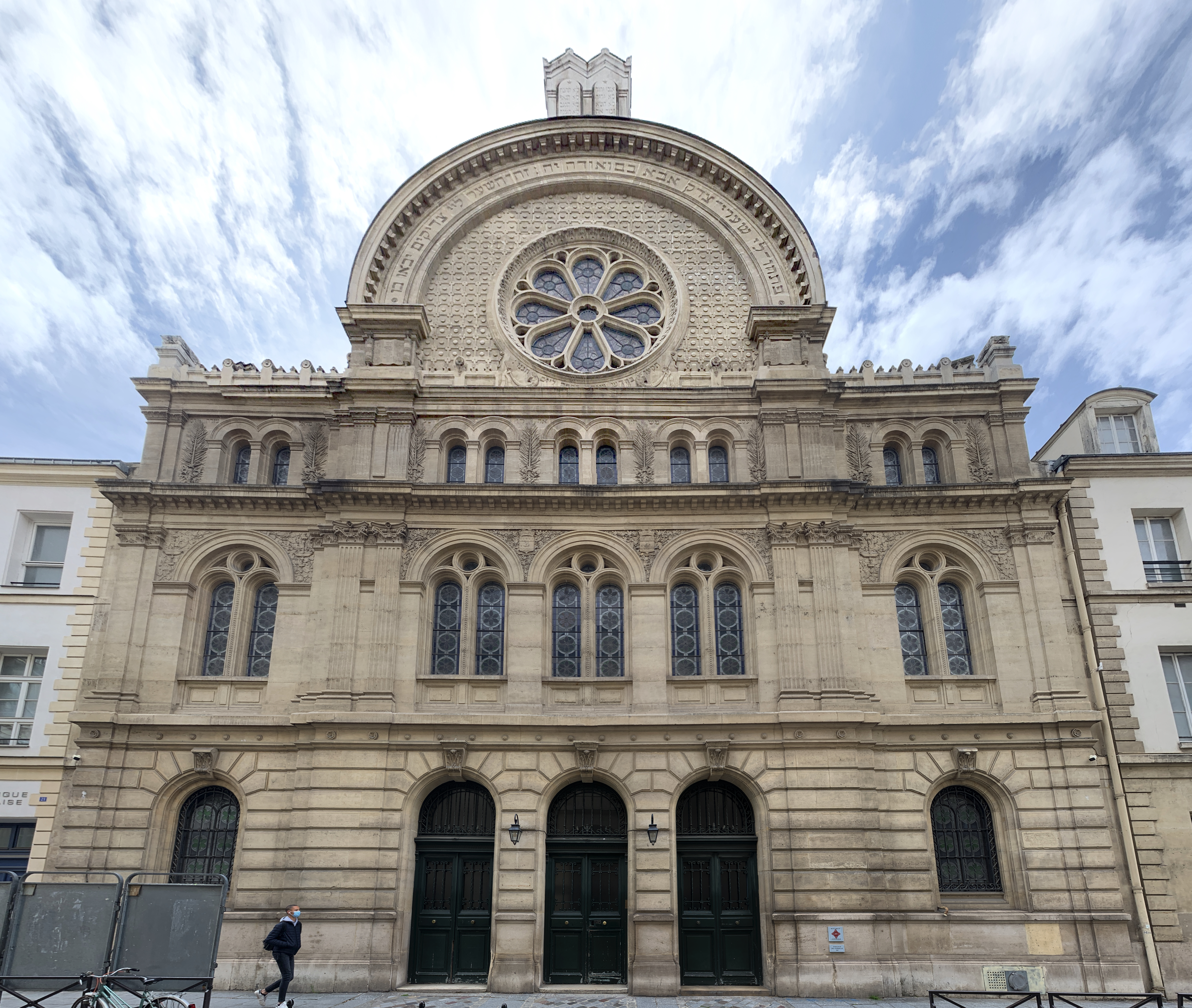
- Synagogue des Tournelles, in 2021

- Location of the synagogue in Paris

Religion
- Affiliation: Orthodox Judaism
- Rite: Nusach Ashkenaz (1876–1958); Nusach Sefard (since 1958)
- Ecclesiastical or organizational status: Synagogue
- Leadership: Rabbi Yves-Henri Marcuano
- Status: Active

Location
- Location: 21 Rue des Tournelles, the Marais, 4th arrondissement, Paris
- Country: France
- Interactive map of Synagogue Tournelles
- Coordinates: 48°51′19″N 2°22′01″E

Architecture
- Architects: Marcellin Varcollier (exterior); Gustave Eiffel (interior)
- Type: Synagogue architecture
- Style: Romanesque Revival; Byzantine Revival
- Completed: 1876
- Capacity: 1,300 worshippers

Website
- synatournelles.fr

Monument historique
- Official name: Synagogue
- Type: Base Mérimée
- Designated: 29 December 1987

The Synagogue des Tournelles (French: Synagogue de la rue des Tournelles) is an Orthodox Jewish congregation and synagogue, located on the Rue des Tournelles, in the Marais, in the 4th arrondissement of Paris, France. The building was dedicated on 15 September 1876, during Jewish New Year celebrations.

== History ==
The first synagogue, on this site, was completed in 1861 and was destroyed by fire during the Paris Commune of 1871.

The current synagogue was completed in 1876, built in the Romanesque Revival and Byzantine Revival styles, and was described as an architectural gem. Principally designed by Marcellin Varcollier, the internal visible metallic framework was created by Gustave Eiffel.

The original congregation was mostly French Jews from the Alsace and Lorraine regions of eastern France. They were joined later by immigrants from Poland, Russia, and other countries of central Europe.

In 1941, the synagogue was attacked as one of Paris synagogue attacks planned by the far-right Revolutionary Social Movement.

This synagogue was listed as an historical monument of France on 29 December 1987; and was included in the Base Mérimée, a database of architectural heritage maintained by the French Ministry of Culture.

== See also ==
- Base Mérimée
- Centre des monuments nationaux
- History of the Jews in France
- List of synagogues in France
