= Montmartre Synagogue =

Orthodox synagogue in Paris, France

- French: Synagogue de la rue Sainte-Isaure
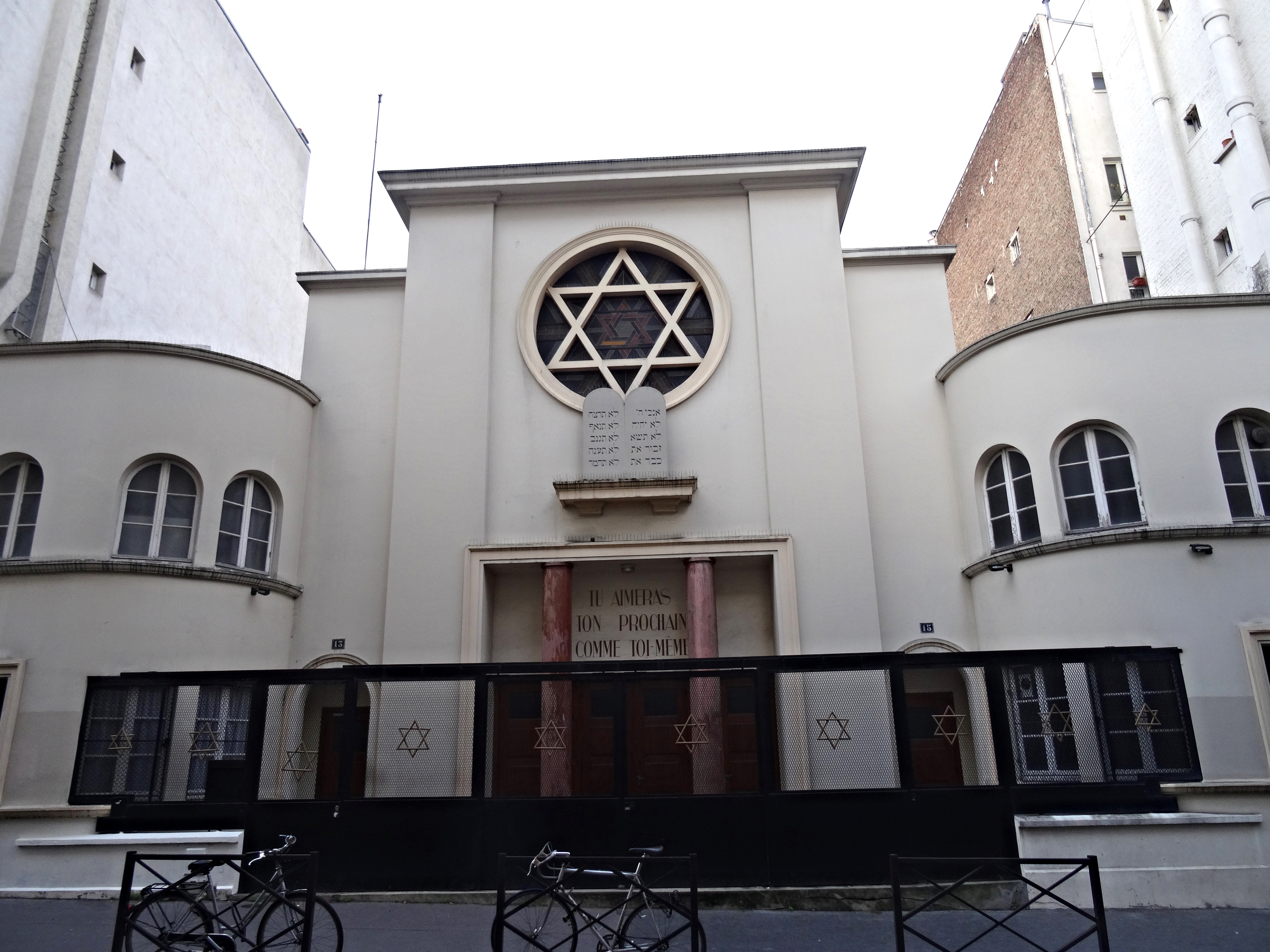
- The synagogue façade in 2015

- Location of the synagogue in Paris

Religion
- Affiliation: Orthodox Judaism
- Rite: Nusach Sefard; Nusach Ashkenaz (Note: Only one reference sourced re Ashkenazi; all other references talk of the Portuguese Sephardi community.)
- Ecclesiastical or organizational status: Synagogue
- Ownership: Association of the Israelite Consistory of Paris
- Status: Active

Location
- Location: 13 rue Saint-Isaure, XVIIIe arrondissement, Paris
- Country: France
- Interactive map of Montmartre Synagogue
- Coordinates: 48°53′37″N 2°20′38″E

Architecture
- Architects: Lucien Hesse (1907); Germain Debré (1939)
- Type: Synagogue architecture
- Style: International
- Completed: 1907; 1939
- Materials: Brick

The Montmartre Synagogue (French: Synagogue de la rue Sainte-Isaure) is an Orthodox Jewish congregation and synagogue, located on the Rue Sainte-Isaure, in the XV111e arrondissement of Paris, France.

Since 1904 a small Jewish temple has been functioning at this location. In 1907, baron Edmond de Rothschild contributed to its expansion.

During the Second World War, in 1941 the synagogue was damaged by far-right French collaborators.

From 1975 to 2006, Chief Rabbi Meyer Zini served at the synagogue and led the Montmartre community for over thirty years. When he arrived, this Ashkenazi synagogue was sparsely attended, if not nearly abandoned. He revitalized community life, attracted a large congregation, and established a Talmud Torah. His spiritual leadership, characterized by strong Zionist commitment and a central emphasis on the Land of Israel, deeply influenced the community’s youth, many of whom eventually chose to emigrate to Israel.

== See also ==
- 1941 Paris synagogue attacks
- History of the Jews in France
- List of synagogues in France

== Additional reading ==
- Meslin, Michel (1993). Paris et ses religions au XX^{e} siècle : actes du colloque du 6 novembre 1990 (in French). Vol. 2: Cahiers d'anthropologie religieuse. Presses Paris Sorbonne. p. 87. ISBN 2840500051. ISSN 1165-273X – via Google Books.
- Desprairies, Cécile (2009). "Préface de Serge Klarsfeld". Paris dans la Collaboration (in French). Paris: éditions du Seuil. ISBN 978-2-02-097646-6.
- Jarassé, Dominique (2003). Guide du patrimoine juif parisien (in French). Parigramme.
