= Mohamed el-Maadi =

Algerian fascist (1902–1954/56)

Mohamed El Maadi
- محمد المعادى
- Born: 22 January 1902; Mechroha, French Algeria
- Died: 1954 or 1956; Egypt
- Known for: Constantine riots (1934)
- Notable work: L'Afrique du nord, terre d'histoire
- Political party: National Popular Rally; Revolutionary Social Movement
- Military Service
- Allegiance: Nazi Germany; France
- Branch: Schutzstaffel; French Army
- Service years: 1943-1945 (Nazi Germany); 1939-1940 & 1920s-1936 (France)
- Units: North African Legion: Constantine Division; 3rd Zouave Regiment; 2nd Zouave Regiment
- Conflicts: World War Two; Battle of France; Rif War
- Awards: Knight of the Legion of Honour (1940); Ordre de la Division

Mohamed El-Maadi (Arabic: محمد المعادى, romanized: Muḥammad al-Maʿādi; 2 January 1902 – between 1954 and 1956) was an Algerian fascist, ardent anti-semite, and Germanophile.

A Sorbonne student, El-Maadi founded the first Algerian nationalist party, The "Algerian People's Party" in 1922. This initiative failed to garner significant support among Algerian diaspora in France. During the interwar period, El-Maadi's affiliations shifted, as he became associated with La Cagoule, a far-right conspiracy to overthrow the republic. by late 1930s, he was already described by security services as expressing a "ferocious hatred for communists and Jews". El-Maadi reenlisted in the French army during the 1939 campaign and became a highly decorated officer, he was awarded the legion of honour as well as the Ordre de la Division medal for his composure, energy, and uncommon courage. Later, he aligned himself with collaborationist efforts. Notably, El-Maadi played a pivotal role in the establishment of the North African Brigade, alongside Henri Lafont. However, with the conclusion of World War II, El-Maadi found himself a refuge in Egypt, where he eventually died.

== Biography ==
His paternal grandfather, Abdallah ben Messaoud El Maadi married Frenchwoman Marie Madeleine Thérèse Lacave. Muhammad El Maadi's two grandfathers were brothers—his father, lawyer Mahfoud El Maadi, married his first cousin, Melouka El Maadi.

Mohamed El-Maadi thus, a French by birth, came from a Chaoui Berber and Muslim family that was well assimilated into French culture.

Mohamed El-Maadi (alias: Mohamed SS) was, like the other Algerian nationalist Saïd Mohammedi, a member of the Gestapo, who actively collaborated with the Third Reich during the Vichy regime. Strongly imbued with the discourse of the Croix-de-Feu, military and an active militant of the French far-right, he encouraged Muslim anti-Semitism in French Algeria, and played a crucial role in the Constantine riots from 3 to 5 August 1934. In that event, Muslims killed twenty-five Jews (fourteen men, six women, and five children; fourteen of whom were beheaded).

He temporarily left the army in 1936 to avoid serving the leftist government of Léon Blum. He then formed an organisation called L'Algérie Française in Paris. He campaigned for reform, equality between colonist and colonised and more opportunities for Algerians.

El-Maadi became more militant as the 1930s ticked on, he joined the terrorist organization La Cagoule, for which he was arrested and sentenced to eight months in prison. Re-enlisting during the 1940 campaign, he was awarded the Legion of Honor. During the German occupation, he was active in the Revolutionary Social Movement (MSR), founded by former thugs. Then he became responsible for issues inherent to the Maghreb within the National Popular Rally (RNP) of his friend Marcel Déat. Mohamed was in charge of organizing the North African RNP Committee. During the same period, he came into contact with Algerian nationalist circles present in France and distanced himself from the RNP, in January 1943 he founded the biweekly publication, Er Rachid, which was financed by the German military intelligence Abwehr.

The Abwehr helped with funding but there was the problem of limited access to newsprint, it was in these circumstances that El-Maadi contacted Henri Lafont. Lafont secured El-Maadi's support for his future candidacy and in return helped him increase the publications print run from 30,000 to 70,000 a week.

El Maadi's anti-Semitic efforts were noted through the reports of police departments and mayors of cities like Batna, Ain Beida, and Constantine. Pro German slogans and Swastikas were commonplace. The Police Commissioner of Batna wrote that some young Algerian Muslims supported Hitler's rise to power in Germany, but that they remained a minority.

After working with the Gestapo, El-Maadi finished the war with the rank of Captain within the Schutzstaffel SS.

== Ideology ==
El-Maadi's political evolution was driven by a consistent set of political aspirations rooted in a strongly ideological vision of North African history.

Six months after Algeria was occupied by the allies, El-Maadi authored a political manifesto entitled "L'Afrique du nord, terre d'histoire" in Paris. This publication, echoed the ideological stance he previously defended in Er Rachid. Within its pages, El-Maadi articulated his vision for a "Eurafrican" collaboration, envisaging a partnership between a fascist France and the indigenous "Arabo-Berber" communities of North Africa.

Central to El-Maadi's narrative was his reinterpretation of Numidian chivalry of antiquity, Christian Donatism of Aures, and themes of medieval Islamic pride from Iberia.

in 1942 the Legion of French Volunteers Against Bolshevism received 12,000 recruits, who were largely a mix of fascists, misfits and a number of North African immigrants who had been inspired by the anti-Communist rhetoric of El-Maadi.

In 1943, Mohamed El-Maadi met Henri Lafont, head of the Parisian bureau of the Gestapo, with whom he founded the North African Brigade. This brigade was made up of about 300 Algerians, although El-Maadi claimed that he could recruit three thousand men a month when needed, mainly from the Goutte d'Or neighborhood of Paris. The brigade was responsible for several massacres in Dordogne. In August 1944, he took refuge with his wife in Germany, where he was welcomed by the Grand Mufti, Amin al-Husseini, who helped him flee Europe to the Middle East. A French court sentenced him to life in prison in absentia.
