= Murder of Laetitia Toureaux =

1937 murder in Paris, France

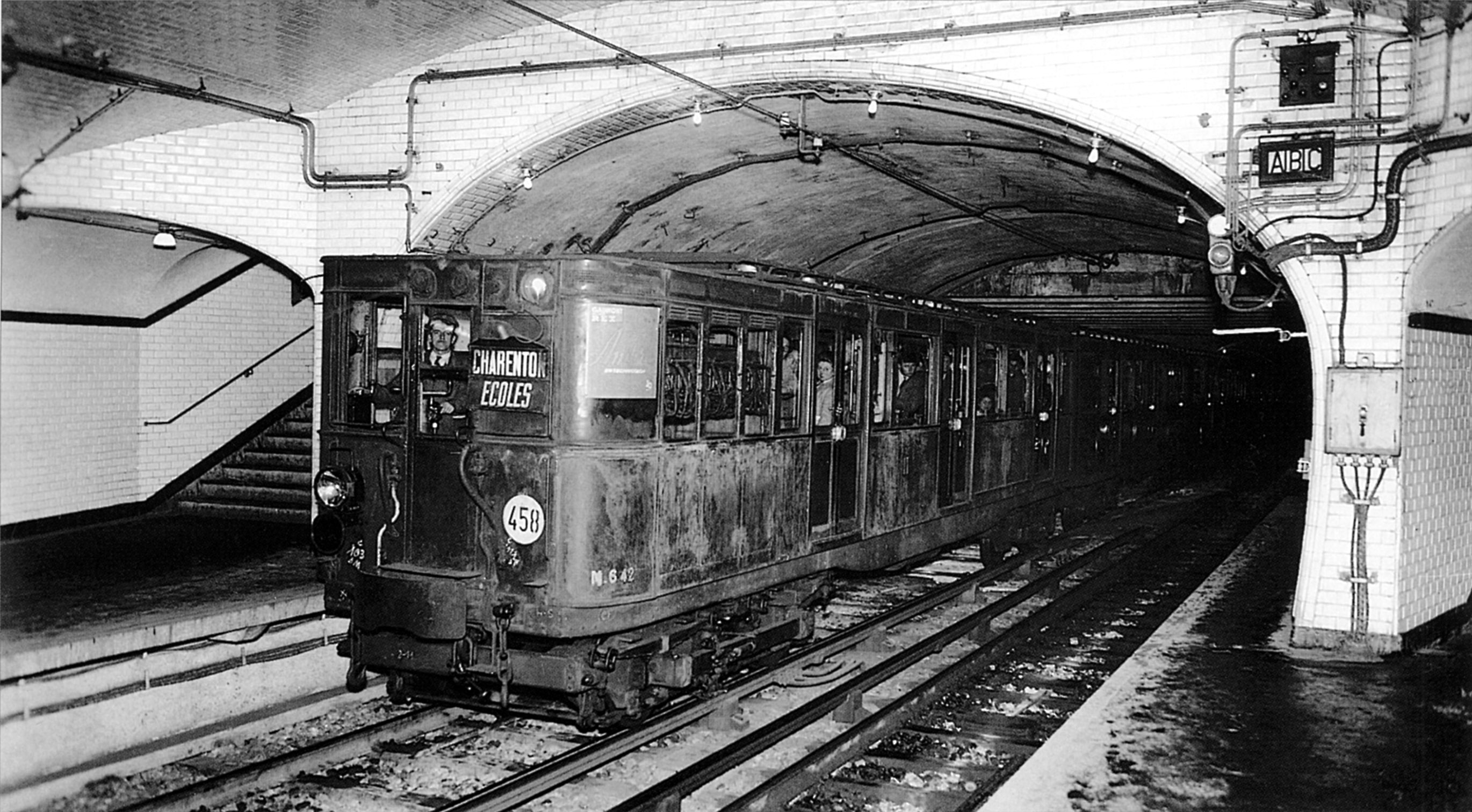
- Sprague-Thomson train on Line 8 to Charenton–Écoles c. 1940; Toureaux was murdered on a train like this one.
- Location: Paris Métro Line 8, Paris, France
- Date: 16 May 1937; 89 years ago 6:27 p.m. – 6:28 p.m. (CET)
- Attack type: Stabbing
- Weapon: Knife
- Victim: Laetitia Toureaux
- Perpetrator: Unknown
- Motive: Unknown

Lætitia-Marie-Joséphine Toureaux (née Nourrissat; 11 September 1907 – 16 May 1937) was a murder victim who was found stabbed to death inside an empty Paris Métro carriage. Further investigations into her death later revealed that other than working as a factory worker in the day, she worked as a spy to infiltrate the La Cagoule, a far-right terrorist group, who may have been behind her death. However, the case was dropped in 1939 during the start of the Second World War before any suspects could be identified, leaving her murder unsolved.

Laetitia Toureaux
- Born: Lætitia-Marie-Joséphine Nourrissat; 11 September 1907; Oyace, Aosta Valley, Italy
- Died: 16 May 1937 (aged 29); Paris, France
- Cause of death: Homicide by stabbing
- Spouse: Jules Toureaux (m. 1930; died 1934)

== Biography and death ==
Laetitia Nourrissat was born in Oyace, a municipality in French-speaking Aosta Valley. She moved to Paris with her mother and her four siblings. In 1930, she married Jules Toureaux. She was found dead in a Paris Métro carriage at Porte Dorée on 16 May 1937, having suffered a single stab wound in the neck. This crime was widely discussed at the time, and the interwar period generated multiple speculations, involving the secret services and the violent political group La Cagoule. Toureaux entered an unoccupied metro car at one stop, and was found stabbed to death less than 90 seconds later at the next stop. Toureaux was the first person to be killed on the Paris Métro.

== Investigation ==
Police investigations, led by Commissioner Badin, found that the victim was leading a double life, and that her entire family, originally from Italy, had relocated to France. Many Italians came to Paris at the time in search of work. Toureaux worked during the day in a factory, but was found to also be working under a false name as an attendant at a dance hall with a seedy reputation, and frequently making discreet visits to the Italian Embassy. She was known to have had various lovers, leading police to initially suspect a crime of passion. However, further investigation revealed she had been working as a spy. She had been employed to infiltrate La Cagoule, a far-right terrorist group that was often overlooked later in post-war France. In 1937, a member of La Cagoule who was in police custody stated that Jean Filiol was behind Toureaux's death. Another member also claimed later on that Toureaux's murder was decided at a Cagoule meeting, although he later retracted the statement, saying it had been given under duress. The case was dropped two years later at the outbreak of the Second World War and the files will be kept from the public until 2038, leaving the case unsolved.

== Adaptation ==
On 29 June 1978, one episode of the French TV series De mémoire d'homme (From man's memory) was based on the murder of Toureaux. It was named L'affaire Laetitia Toureaux ou Le crime parfait. A book named Murder in a Metro was also written about the crime.

== See also ==
- List of unsolved murders (1900–1979)
- Locked-room mystery
- Murder of Deborah Linsley – 1988 English murder victim
