= Jean Fontenoy =

French journalist, communist and fascist politician

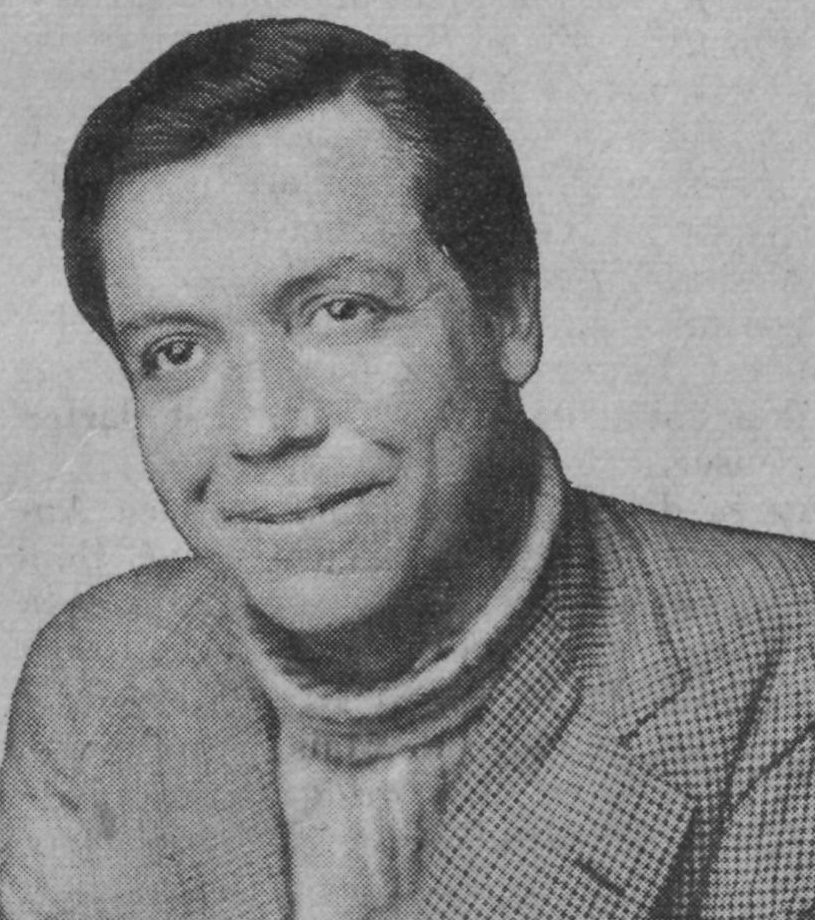
- Born: 21 March 1899; Fontainebleau, Seine-et-Marne, France
- Died: 28 April 1945 (aged 46); Berlin, Nazi Germany
- Cause of death: Killed in action
- Political party: National Popular Rally; Revolutionary Social Movement; Parti Populaire Français
- Spouses: Madeleine Charnaux (m. 1938; died 1943) Lizica Codreanu (div. 1935)
- Allegiance: Nazi Germany; Finland; France
- Conviction: collaboration
- Penalty: 20 years hard labour (in absentia)
- military service
- Service years: 1941-1942 (Nazi Germany); 1939-1940 (Finland); 1918-1922 (France)
- Rank: Lieutenant (Finland); Second Lieutenant (France)
- Units: 7th Infantry Division (Nazi Germany); Legion of French Volunteers Against Bolshevism
- Conflicts: World War I; World War II; Winter War (WIA); Eastern Front; Battle of Moscow

Jean Fontenoy (21 March 1899 – 28 April 1945) was a French journalist and political activist. Initially a communist sympathizer, he later turned to fascism and was involved in collaboration with Nazi Germany during World War II.

== Biography ==
Born in Fontainebleau, Seine-et-Marne, Fontenoy worked as a journalist for the Havas news agency from 1924 to the mid-1930s in Soviet Russia, then China. While in China, he founded the French-language Journal de Shanghai and became the subject of a gossip campaign suggesting that he was having an affair with Soong Mei-ling, Chiang Kai-shek's wife.

Returning to France he sought involvement in politics, initially with the French Communist Party before he switched to the French Popular Party, a group that he left in 1939 because of his personal dislike of its leader, Jacques Doriot. Before long, however, Fontenoy put his personal issues to one side, rejoined the PPF and played a leading role in helping to reorganise the movement, and he also wrote widely not only for the PPF newspapers but also for the likes of L'Insurgé and Je suis partout.

Despite his skill as an organiser and writer, Fontenoy began to develop a reputation for eccentricity that was aided by his personal habits. Already an alcoholic, Fontenoy was widowed in 1941 and began to abuse opium and morphine. He was also seriously injured after volunteering for service in the Winter War and the head wounds that he sustained led to brain damage.

After those instances, Fontenoy continued to be a leading figure on the far right, but his actions came to be somewhat more erratic. In 1938 he married Madeleine Charnaux.

For a time, he served Pierre Laval as his personal envoy to Otto Abetz. That was followed by the launch of the newspaper La Vie Nationale, which proved short-lived and was followed by a number of equally-short-lived collaborationist reviews.

He was a founder of Mouvement Social Révolutionnaire and became leader of the group in 1942 after Eugène Deloncle had stepped aside. However, Fonteony soon lost interest in what was a declining group. He then switched over to the National Popular Rally and formed part of the five-man directorate, chaired by Marcel Déat, that led the group.

During that period, Fontenoy became fixated with the notion that Doriot was plotting to kill him despite a lack of evidence. That played a role in his next move in which he enrolled in the Legion of French Volunteers Against Bolshevism (LVF) and was sent to the Eastern Front. He served as LVF propaganda chief who was also acting as a spy. He was killed while he was fighting the Soviets in Berlin a few days before the end of the war after he had been fatally shot in the head.

== Bibliography ==
- Gérard GUEGAN, Fontenoy ne reviendra plus, Stock, Parijs, 2011
- Philippe VILGIER, Jean Fontenoy, aventurier, journaliste et écrivain, Uitg. Via Romana, 2012
