= Madeleine Charnaux =

French war correspondent, sculptor, designer, and aviator

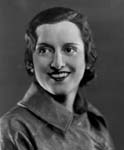
- Born: 18 January 1902; Vichy, France
- Died: 10 October 1943 (aged 41); Vichy, Vichy France
- Spouse(s): Pierre Frondaie (1922-1927); Jean Fontenoy (m. 1938)

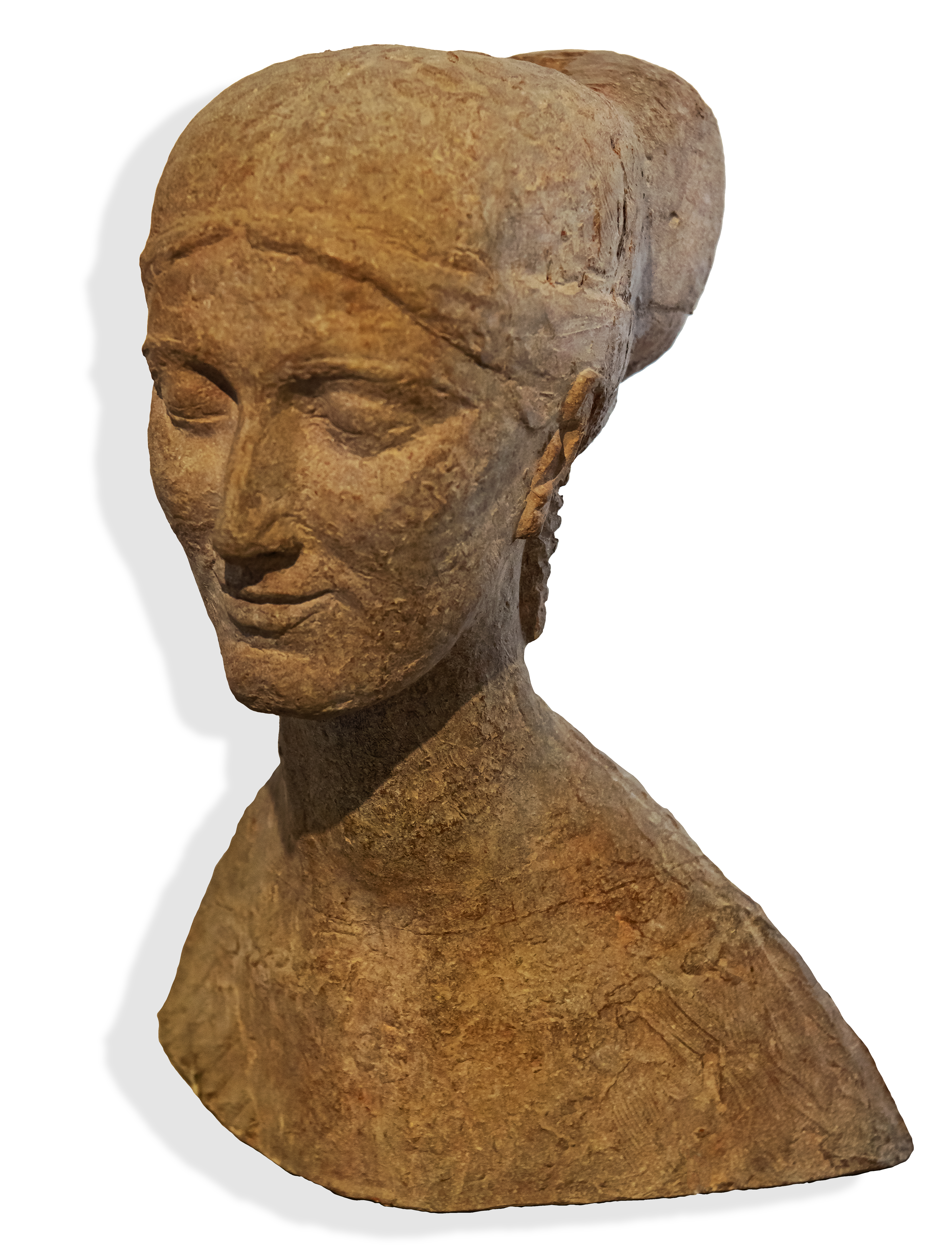
Madeleine Charnaux by Bourdelle

Madeleine Charnaux (18 January 1902 – 10 October 1943) was a French war correspondent, sculptor, designer and aviator. She was the first woman in the Roland Garros pilots’ club.

== Biography ==
Madeleine Charnaux, born in Vichy on 18 January 1902. Her father and brothers were doctors. Initially Charnaux set out to become a sculptor and studied with Émile-Antoine Bourdelle. She married the writer Pierre Frondaie on 22 September 1922 but their marriage only lasted for five years. After her marriage, Charnaux fell in love with flying after a trip to southern Italy on board a seaplane in 1930. She went on to get her pilot's licence and won the Jacques Roques Cup with over 17,000 km (10,600 mi) of air travel in Africa. She traveled extensively in Africa and in 1934 was a guest of the governor of Libya and met aviator Italo Balbo. Charnaux began flying demonstrations for Caudron-Renault. She was grounded for over a year until October 1936 due to an accident. During this time she wrote for the magazine L'Aéro.

Charnaux set a number of records for flying and was awarded with the Knight's Cross of the Legion of Honour. In 1938, Charnaux married Jean Fontenoy who was believed to have died during the Second World War. His body was never found. The war grounded her but in September 1939 Charnaux opened a school to train women as aircraft mechanics and radio operators. She wrote a number of books. However she suffered from tuberculosis which prevailed in 1943. She died in Vichy on 11 October 1943. The funeral was held in the Saint-Louis church on October 13 and she was buried in the Cimetière des Bartins.

== Bibliography ==
- La passion du ciel – Souvenirs d'une aviatrice, 1942, Hachette
- Qui a tué Marina Sturm?, 1943, France-Empire

== Records ==
Altitude records

- 4,990m – 24 September 1934, St-Cyr school of Guer aerodrome, Madeleine Charnaux as captain and Yvonne Jourjon as co-pilot
- 6,150m – 29 January 1935, in Orly, Madeleine Charnaux as captain and Edith Clark as co-pilot

Speed record

- 283.24 km/h – 8 May 1937, from Ville Sauvage to La Marmogne route, with the Caudron Rafale C-530 with Renault engine Bengali.
- 268.64 km/h – 17 October 1937, Women's record.
