= Gabriel Jeantet =

French far-right activist and journalist (1906-1978)

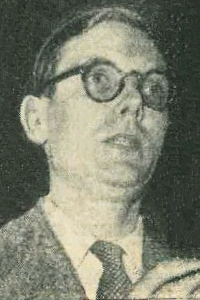
- Born: 3 April 1906
- Died: 1 December 1978 (aged 72)
- Known for: Far-right activist
- Political party: Action Française; Ordre Nouveau
- Movement: La Cagoule; Party of New Forces
- Relatives: Claude Jeantet (brother)

Gabriel Jeantet (French pronunciation: [ɡabʁijɛl ʒɑ̃tɛ]; 3 April 1906 – 1 December 1978) was a French far-right activist, journalist and polemicist. Active before, during and after the Second World War, Jeantet's links to François Mitterrand became a source of controversy during the latter's presidency. His brother Claude Jeantet was also a far-right activist.

== La Cagoule ==
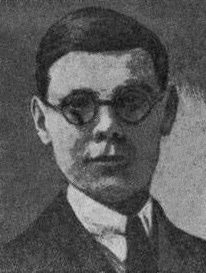
Jeantet in the 1930s

Jeantet's early political involvement was with the ultra-conservative Action Française and he served as a student leader for this group. He joined La Cagoule when the movement was established, citing his fear of an imminent communist revolution as the main reason for his decision to join.

As the group's main theoretic writer during its existence, Jeantet sought to steer the group towards a socialist economic position, arguing in 1942 in favour of a "national and socialist revolution" similar to that associated with Strasserism. This was despite the fact that Jeantet was fully aware of La Cagoule being funded by wealthy industrialists such as Jacques Lemaigre-Dubreuil and Louis Renault, all of whom despised the concept of socialism. Ultimately Jeantet and La Cagoule leader Eugène Deloncle came to endorse a form of national syndicalism in which corporatist trade unions involving workers and management would be central to a planned economy.

As well as his extensive writing on behalf of La Cagoule, Jeantet also played a leading in gun-running for the organisation, smuggling weapons into France from like-minded groups Fascist Italy and Nationalist Spain, as well as Belgium and Switzerland.

== During the war ==
Following the Battle of France and the establishment of the Vichy Regime Jeantet, who became a supporter of collaboration with the Nazis, was brought into Philippe Pétain's government as inspecteur général à la propagande. However, when his initial enthusiasm for collaboration waned, due in large part to the high degree of control exercised by the occupying Germans, Jeantet followed the lead of Deloncle in resigning from the Vichy government in 1942. He would later make contact with the French Resistance, such was his disillusionment with Nazism.

=== Relationship to Mitterrand ===
François Mitterrand, who had been a minor functionary under Vichy, maintained a lifelong friendship with Jeantet even during his presidency. Mitterrand had even written for Jeantet's journal France: Revue de l'Etat Nouveau during the war, a fact that would later be used against Mitterrand by his political opponents. The journal was particularly noted for its strong anti-Semitic articles, although Mitterrand's own piece was decidedly innocuous in terms of content. Jeantet was also one of two nominees, the other being Simon Arbellot, who put forward Mitterrand's name for the Ordre de la francisque medal in 1943.

== Post-war activity ==
In 1948 Jeantet was arrested along with a number of other surviving members of La Cagoule and stood trial on charges relating to a plot by the organisation to set a series of bombs off in Paris in 1937. It was during this trial that Jeantet revealed the extent to which leading figures in French industry, many of whom continued to dominate post-war France, had been involved in providing the movement with financial support. Jeantet was sentenced to 25 years in prison, albeit this was later reduced to four years.

During the late 1960s Jeantet was involved in the formation of the far-right umbrella group Ordre Nouveau. At the movement's foundation in 1969 he was appointed to the group's national council along with Henry Charbonneau, with the two veterans serving as "mentors" to the new group. By the 1970s Jeantet had become associated with a group of former Ordre Nouveau activists known as the Faire Front and he was a founder member in 1974 when this group transformed itself into the Party of New Forces. Jeantet committed suicide in 1978.

== Cited sources ==
- Mouré, Kenneth and Alexander, Martin S. (2002). Crisis and Renewal in France, 1918–1962. Berghahn Books. ISBN 9781571812971.
- Shields, James (2007). The Extreme Right in France: From Pétain to Le Pen. Routledge. ISBN 9780415097550.
- Soucy, Robert (1995). French Fascism: The Second Wave, 1933–1939. Yale University Press. ISBN 9780300059960.
