= 1941 Paris synagogue attacks =

Synagogue attack

- Part of World War II in France and The Holocaust in France
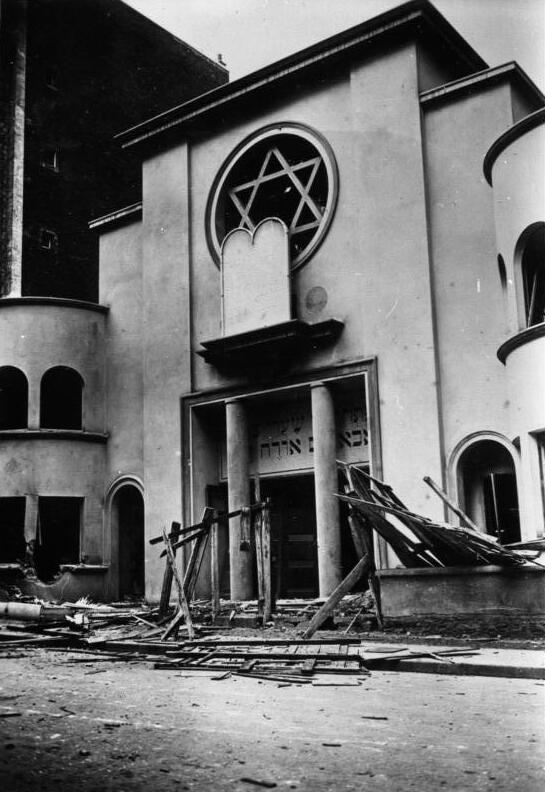
- Montmartre Synagogue after the incident (photo from the Bundesarchiv).
- Location: Paris, France
- Date: 3 October 1941; 2:05 a.m. - 4:05 a.m.
- Attack type: Bombings
- Deaths: 0
- Perpetrators: Milice and Mouvement Social Révolutionnaire
- Convicted: Hans Sommer (as an accessory)

On the night of October 2–3, 1941, six synagogues were attacked in Paris and damaged by explosive devices places by their doors between 2:05 and 4:05 am. The perpetrators were identified but not arrested.

== History ==
On the night of October 2–3, 1941, explosive devices were placed in front of six synagogues causing damage to them.

=== Synagogues affected ===
- Synagogue des Tournelles (in the Jewish Marais district)
- Synagogue de la rue Copernic (16th arrondissement of Paris)
- Synagogue Nazareth (3rd arrondissement of Paris)
- Synagogue de la rue Pavée (4th arrondissement of Paris)
- Montmartre Synagogue (18th arrondissement of Paris)
- Grand Synagogue of Paris (9th arrondissement of Paris)

=== The attacks ===
Helmut Knochen, Chief Commandant of the Sicherheitspolizei (Nazi Occupying Security Services) ordered the attacks on the Paris synagogues.

Members of the Milice placed the bombs. At the Synagogue de la rue Copernic, there was partial destruction of the building (the window jamb and the sill were destroyed and the windows were blown out) that the community rebuilt in 1946. In a journal entry dated September 11, 1942, writer Hélène Berr, wrote:

After wandering all afternoon (Boulevard Saint-Germain, the Sorbonne, Condorcet), I went to the Temple for Rosh Hashana. The service was celebrated in the oratory and the marriage hall, as the main temple had been destroyed by the Doriotists. It was lamentable. No young people. Nothing but old people, the only representative of the "olden times" was Madame Baur.

— Hélène Berr

The Revolutionary Social Movement (MSR), a far-right political party was also implicated in the attacks. From research by Patrick Fournie (2016):

The Revolutionary Social Movement of Eugène Deloncle, former leader of the Cagoule, also recruited several thousand members and was known above all as the executor on behalf of the SIPO-SD in the attacks on the Parisian synagogues on the night of October 2–3, 1941. Deloncle nevertheless lost the support of his protectors and was executed by the Gestapo in November 1943.

— Patrick Fournie

According to Frédéric Monier (2011):

After the fall of France and the creation of the Vichy Regime, a majority of former "Cagoulards" became engaged in collaborationist activity, often under the guise of the Revolutionary Social Movement – the MSR – created by Eugène Deloncle in Autumn 1940. The small group, later integrated into the National Popular Rally of Marcel Deat, ceased to exist by 1942. It was this group that was responsible "without a doubt, among others, for the attacks against synagogues in Paris and the assassination of former government minister Marx Dormoy.

— Frédéric Monier

Hans Sommer, agent with the Nazi intelligence services in charge of France, contacted Eugène Deloncle in 1941. Sommer provided the materials that Deloncle used in the attacks against the synagogues. After the war, Sommer was sentenced to two years in prison by a French military court.

=== Reporting ===
According to the Vichy correspondent of the Swiss newspaper Feuille d'Avis de Neuchâtel et du Vignoble neuchâtelois, on Saturday October 4, 1941:

On the night of Thursday and Friday in Paris between 1 am and 5 am, attacks took place against seven synagogues. The Synagogue de la rue de Tournelle [sic], Synagogue de la rue Montespan [sic], Synagogue de la rue Copernic, Synagogue de Notre-Dame de Lazaret [sic], Synagogue de Notre-Dame des victoires and a sixth located on a road of which we don't yet know the name were attacked. The damage is considerable, as just the walls remain. The bomb at the Synagogue de la rue Pavée, near City Hall, was removed in time. Two people were injured. Admiral Dard, Prefect of Police, arrived on the scene and is leading the investigation. The attacks took places the day after the Day of Atonement.

The article continued:

What they say in Vichy

Our Correspondent in Vichy called us and said:

Since last July, this is the third time that such attacks have taken place. The first was in Marseille in mid-July, the second in Vichy last August 9. It is noted that the third attack against the Israelite Temples took place on the night following Yom Kippur.

=== Neither surprise nor emotion ===
A police report by the Renseignements généraux dated October 4, 1941, said:

Generally, the Parisian public don't like the Jews, but they are tolerated. Traders often wished to be rid of the Israelites because they were in great competition with them. In fact, the severe measures taken against the Jews by the German authorities and the French government have not raised any protests among the general population but many people find the violent anti-semitism of the Parisian press excessive, exceeding even their own antipathy towards Jews. The opinion of most people – particularly in Catholic circles – is that adversaries of the Jews generalize too much and that such anti-semitism will lead to regrettable excesses. Therefore, the announcement of the attacks on local synagogues caused neither surprise nor emotion among the public. "It was bound to happen," we heard with a certain air of indifference.

=== Silence from the Church ===
Following the attacks on the Paris synagogues, the Archbishop of Paris Emmanuel Suhard, remained silent. In the Free zone, the Association of French Rabbis expressed surprise at this silence. Several bishops reached out to the rabbis with support, following the example of Cardinal Jules-Géraud Saliège of Toulouse, who wrote a letter of support to Rabbi Moïse Cassorla.

== Bibliography ==
- Bourdrel, Philippe (2009). Les Cagoulards dans la guerre (in French). Paris: Albin Michel. p. 282. ISBN 978-2-226-19325-4..
- Finley-Croswhite, Annette; Brunelle, Gayle K. (2019). "Creating a Holocaust Landscape on the Streets of Paris". Holocaust and Genocide Studies. 33 (1): 60–89. doi:10.1093/hgs/dcz009. S2CID 182038936..
- Patrick Fournier. La délation des Juifs à Paris pendant l’Occupation, 1940-1944. Université de Paris Ouest Nanterre La Défense.Université d’Ottawa. Thèse en cotutelle internationale pour obtenir les grades de Docteur de l’Université d’Ottawa. Discipline : Histoire. Docteur de l’Université Paris Ouest Nanterre La Défense. Discipline : Science Politique. Ottawa, Canada, 2016
- Millington, Chris; Passmore, Kevin (2015). Political violence and democracy in Western Europe, 1918–1940. Houndmills, Basingstoke, Hampshire: Palgrave Macmillan. p. 208. ISBN 978-1-137-51594-0.
- Monier, Frédéric (2011). Corruption et politique : rien de nouveau. Éléments de réponse (in French). Paris: Armand Colin. p. 184. ISBN 978-2-200-24860-4..

== See also ==
- Paris in World War II
- Antisemitism in France
