= La Cagoule =

French far-right terrorist organization

- Leader: Eugène Deloncle
- Dates active: 1936–1938
- Country: France
- Ideology: French nationalism Fascism; Anti-communism; Antisemitism
- Political position: Far-right

La Cagoule (French pronunciation: [la kaɡul], "The Cowl"; founded in 1936) (Note: Press nickname coined by the Action Française nationalist Maurice Pujo.) was a French fascist-leaning and anti-communist militant group. It opposed the left-wing Popular Front (in office, June 1936 to 1938) and used violence to promote its activities in the final years of the Third Republic and into the Vichy Regime. La Cagoule was founded by Eugène Deloncle and bankrolled, among others, by Eugène Schueller, the founder of L'Oréal.

La Cagoule committed assassinations, and undertook bombings, sabotage of armaments, and other violent activities, some intended to cast suspicion on communists through false flag operations and to add to political instability. Planning a November 1937 overthrow of the French government, La Cagoule was infiltrated by the police, and the national government arrested and imprisoned about 70 men. At the outbreak of World War II (September 1939), the government released the men to fight in the French Army. Some supported other right-wing organizations and participated in the Vichy government of 1940–1944; others joined the Free French of Charles de Gaulle. It was not until 1948 that the government tried surviving members for the charges of 1937.

== Names ==
Originally the Secret Organisation for Revolutionary National Action (Osarn or OSAR, Organisation secrète d'action révolutionnaire nationale), the group's name was later officially changed to the Secret Committee of Revolutionary Action (CSAR, Comité secret d'action révolutionnaire).

== Third Republic ==
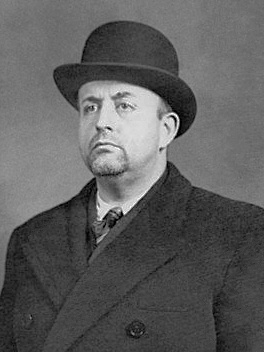
Deloncle in 1937

The group was founded in 1936 or 1937 by Eugène Deloncle and enjoyed privileged relations within industrial circles (National Federation of Ratepayers, Lesieur, L'Oréal etc).

An important member was Joseph Darnand, who later founded the Service d'ordre légionnaire (SOL), the forerunner of the Milice, the collaborationist paramilitary of the Vichy regime. His nephew Henri Charbonneau was also a member.

Another member was Jean Filiol, who was appointed as the head of the Milice in Limoges. He fled to Spain at the end of World War II and he worked in the Spanish subsidiary of L'Oréal. Gabriel Jeantet was a lover of a sister of François Mitterrand, who later recommended him for the Order of the Francisque. Dr. Henri Martin was a physician suspected of having forged the Pacte synarchique and worked for the Organisation armée secrète (OAS) after World War II.

Mohamed el-Maadi, the head of La Cagoule for French Algeria, started the antisemitic newspaper Er Rachid and organised the North-African Brigade, known as SS-Mohammed, in 1944.

The group drew most of its members from Orléanists disappointed by the lack of action by the Action française founded by Charles Maurras. It opposed the Popular Front government, created from an alliance of left-wing groups. Historians believe that many low-level members were recruited in the belief that it was an auto-defense organization, which was intended to fight against a communist takeover.

In Nice, new members were initiated in a formal ritual. In the presence of the Grand Master, dressed in red and accompanied by his assesseurs dressed in black, with their faces covered, new members stood before a table draped with a French flag. A sword and torches were placed on it. Each man raised his right arm and swore the oath, Ad majorem Galliæ gloriam ("For the greater glory of France"). This oath echoed the Jesuit motto, Ad Majorem Dei Gloriam (For the greater glory of God). Disloyalty was punished by death. For instance, the arms suppliers Léon Jean-Baptiste and Maurice Juif were murdered by Cagoulards in October 1936 and February 1937, respectively, for attempting to enrich themselves by lying about the price that they had paid for the arms.

The paramilitary organisation was active in the provinces. In Paris, it organised militias and demonstrations and amassed arms. It attempted to assassinate French Prime Minister Léon Blum, trained men in terrorism, built underground prisons and "ran guns in Belgium, Switzerland and Italy".

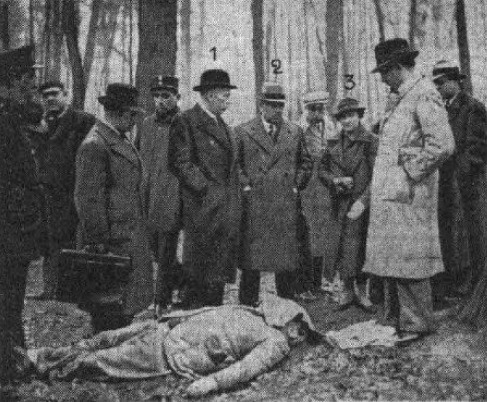
Police investigating the murder of Dimitri Navachine in January 1937

La Cagoule directed its members in various actions aimed at creating suspicions of communists to destabilise and to destroy the French Republic. Some argue that in the Bois de Boulogne on 26 January 1937, Jean Filiol stabbed to death Dimitri Navachine, who was a Soviet national and for several years the respected director of the Paris branch of the Soviet State Bank. Others believed that he had been killed by Joseph Stalin's secret service, the NKVD, as the Great Purge was underway in the Soviet Union. To ease its obtaining arms from Fascist Italy, on 9 June 1937, the group assassinated two Italian antifascists, the Rosselli brothers, who were refugees in France. It sabotaged airplanes clandestinely supplied by the French government to the Spanish Republic. On 11 September 1937, the Cagoule blew up two buildings owned by the Comité des Forges (Ironmasters Association) to create the impression of a communist conspiracy. Although it was widely believed at the time that communists had set the bombs, the government took no official action against the French Communist Party, to the disappointment of the group's members. The Cagoule tried to infiltrate the International Brigades for the same purpose.

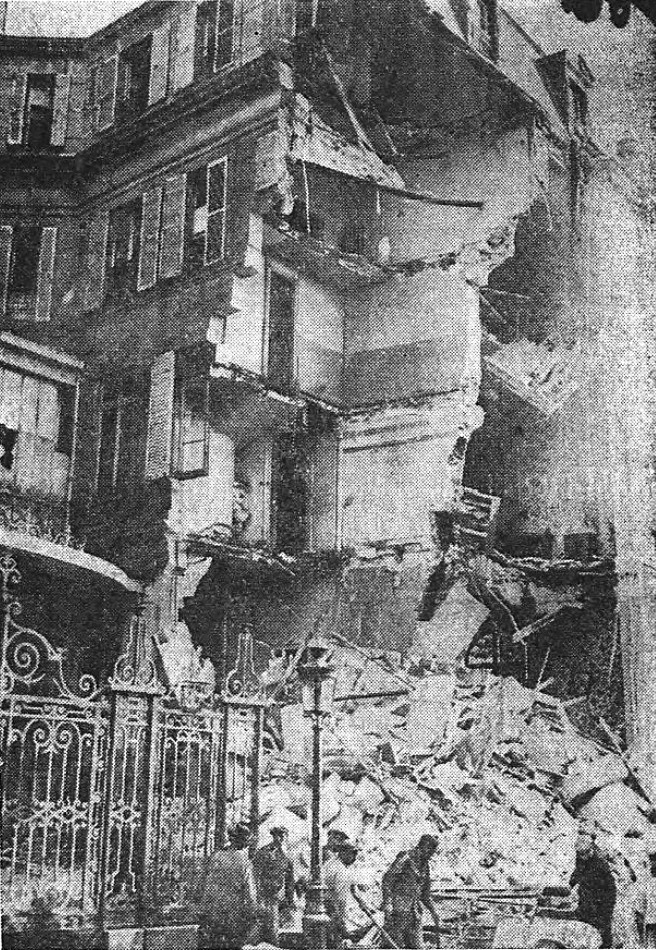
One of the buildings bombed by la Cagoule on 11 September 1937

Organised along military lines, the Cagoule infiltrated parts of the French military via Georges Loustaunau-Lacau's Corvignolles as a means to acquire weapons. It prepared to overthrow the Popular Front government in November 1937 to install a fascist government. The group initially intended to make Philippe Pétain chief of state, but he refused its overtures. The Cagoule chose Marshal Louis Franchet d'Esperey as their future chief of state.

It was infiltrated by the French police. On 15 November 1937, Marx Dormoy, Minister of the Interior and the highest officer of law enforcement, denounced its plot and ordered wide arrests of members. The French police seized 2 tons of high explosives, several anti-tank or anti-aircraft guns, 500 machine guns, 65 submachine guns, 134 rifles and 17 sawn-off shotguns. Some of the arms were of German or Italian origin, and about 70 men were arrested. Deloncle had boasted that he had 12,000 men under his order in Paris, and 120,000 in the provinces, but it is likely there were no more than 200 men who knew much about the organization and its structure, and another several hundred who were more loosely affiliated with the group.

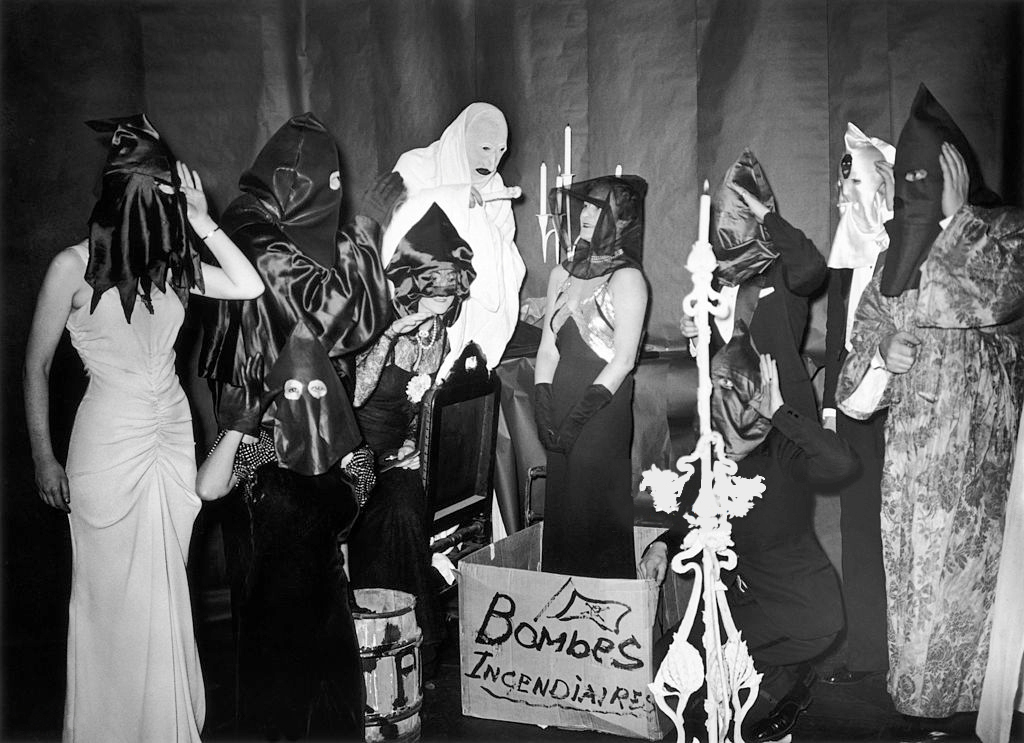
Socialite masquerade of the Cagoule conspiracy after the revelations by the French government in 1937

Reactions to the plot and the revelations by the French government about the Cagoule varied among the international media. In the United States, the editors of the New York Times were initially suspicious of the accounts.

The journalists of Time magazine likened La Cagoule to the American Ku Klux Klan, a right-wing group that had a widespread revival from 1915 and reached its peak of influence in 1925, with members elected to political office in midwestern cities and states as well as the South.

=== Organization ===
- Premier Bureau: Eugène Deloncle and Jacques Corrèze
- Deuxième Bureau (intelligence): Dr. Henri Martin, Alfred Corre (Dagore)
- Troisième Bureau (operations): Georges Cachier
- Quatrième Bureau (recruits and equipment): Jean Moreau de La Meuse
- Sources of funding: Eugène Schueller (L'Oreal), Louis Renault, Lemaigre Dubreuil (owner of table oil Lesieur and department stores Le Printemps), Gabriel Jeantet (Lafarge cements), Pierre Pucheu (Comptoir Sidérurgique)

The Cagoule was organised into cells. Light cells had eight men, armed with submachine guns (typically one per light cell), rifles, semi-automatic pistols and hand grenades. Heavy cells had twelve men, armed with a heavy machine gun and the individual weapons. A group of three cells formed one unit, three units a battalion, three battalions a regiment, two regiments a brigade and two brigades a division. Battalions could be divided into automobile squads of about fifty men. Written communications were avoided as much as possible.

The "street fighting" handbook was titled Secret Rules of the Communist Party to avoid revealing the Cagoule in case the booklet was found by the police.

== World War II ==
At the outbreak of World War II, the French government released imprisoned Cagoulards to fight in the French Army. Some entered the Milice, such as Jacques de Bernonville.

During the Occupation of France in 1940, the Vichy government arrested Marx Dormoy, as he had refused to vote for full powers for Pétain, and it eventually interned him under house arrest at Montélimar. He was assassinated on 26 July 1941 by a clockwork bomb set off at the house. It was believed to have been done by Cagoule terrorists in reprisal for Dormoy's arrests in 1937 and his attempt to suppress the organization.

The members of the Cagoule were divided. Some of them joined various Fascist movements; Schueller and Deloncle founded the Mouvement Social Révolutionnaire, which conducted various activities for Nazi Germany in occupied France. It bombed seven synagogues in Paris in October 1941. Others became prominent members of Philippe Pétain's Vichy Regime. Darnand was the leader of the Milice, the Vichy paramilitary group that fought the French Resistance, and enforced antisemitic policies. He took an oath of loyalty to Adolf Hitler after he had accepted a Waffen SS rank.

Other cagoulards sided against the Germans, either as members of the Resistance (such as Marie-Madeleine Fourcade, Pierre Guillain de Bénouville or Georges Loustaunau-Lacau in the Maquis), or as members of Charles de Gaulle's Free French Forces, such as General Henri Giraud or Colonel Passy. After the war, the politician and writer Henri de Kérillis accused de Gaulle of having been a member of La Cagoule and said that de Gaulle had been ready to install a fascist government if the Allies let him become France's chief of state.

== Postwar ==
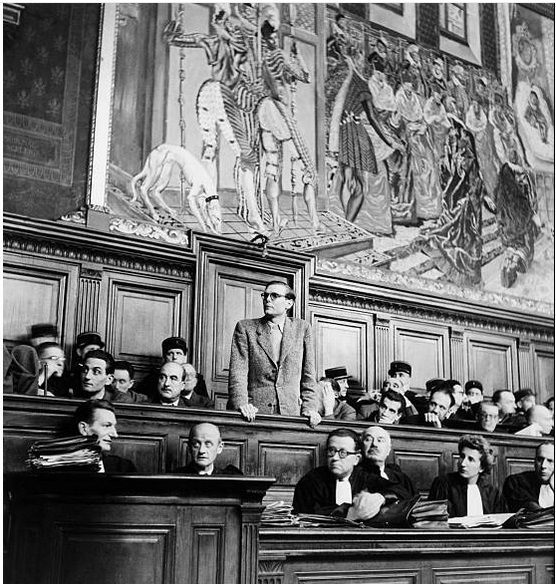
Gabriel Jeantet and other former cagoulards charged during the trial held in 1948.

The cagoulards arrested for the 1937 conspiracy were not brought to trial for those charges until 1948, after the liberation of France. By then, many had served in the Vichy government or the Resistance, and few of them were brought to trial.

== See also ==
- Organisation Armée Secret (OAS)
- Propaganda Due – masonic secret organization infiltrated in the Italian government
- La Main Rouge – Terrorist organization operated by a French intelligence agency
- Laetitia Toureaux – A woman suspected to have been murdered by the La Cagoule
- Anti-communist mass killings
- Organized crime
- Strategy of tension
- Secret society
