= Claude Jeantet =

French journalist and politician (1902–1982)

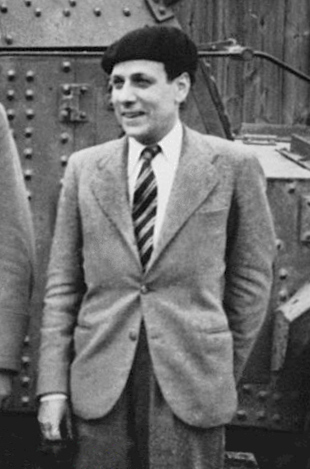
- Jeantet c. 1943
- Born: 12 July 1902; Pomponne, France
- Died: 16 May 1982 (aged 79); Thomery, France
- Occupations: Journalist, politician

Claude Jeantet (French pronunciation: [klod ʒɑ̃tɛ]; 12 July 1902 – 16 May 1982) was a French journalist and far-right politician.

== Biography ==
Jeantet was born in Pomponne, Seine-et-Marne, the son of poet Félix Jeantet and brother of fellow far-right activist Gabriel Jeantet.

He studied under philosopher Léon Brunschvicg at the Sorbonne. He joined the student movement of Action Française in 1919, taking over the editorship of their eponymous paper in 1923, although he severed his ties with the group in 1930. He worked for the publishing house Fayard and was for a time associated with the historian and rightist Pierre Gaxotte, whilst also spending brief periods as a member of both La Cagoule and Croix-de-Feu before, in 1934, becoming close to Paul Marion and the neosocialists. In keeping with his shifting loyalties Jeantet also wrote for a number of journals, including Candide, Je suis partout and Le Petit Journal. His main writing topics were his opposition to democracy and his desire for a rapprochement with Nazi Germany and indeed in 1936 he attended the Nuremberg Rally.

Following his spell in Germany Jeantet joined the Parti Populaire Français (PPF) as a central committee member. He was added to the Politburo of the party in 1938 as one of a number of anti-communist new members. He also served as diplomatic editor of their paper L'Émancipation nationale, which was under the overall control of Maurice-Yvan Sicard. With the outbreak of the Second World War Jeantet became a prominent voice against the conflict, with his writings – along with those of the likes of Drieu la Rochelle and Alfred Fabre-Luce – enough to see PPF paper La Liberte banned for defeatism.

Following the establishment of Vichy France Jeantet served that regime as head of their Foreign Press Service and as editor of Le Petit Parisien, which by then was the mouthpiece of the government. He fled to Germany in 1944 and attempted to continue publishing Le Petit Parisien, but was soon captured and sent back to France where he was sentenced to hard labour for life for his collaborationism.

Despite his life sentence Jeantet was released after a few years and he returned to political involvement. Taking up his pen once again he wrote for a number of far right journals, including the monarchist papers La France Réelle from 1951 and Aspects de la France from 1956 to 1965. He also became a vocal supporter of Poujadism.
