= Hans Sommer (SS officer) =

German SS officer and Holocaust perpetrator (born 1914)

- Born: 26 June 1914; Nortorf, Schleswig-Holstein, German Empire
- Status: Deceased
- Conviction: War crimes
- Penalty: 2 year imprisonment
- Military Service
- Allegiance: Nazi Germany
- Branch: Sicherheitsdienst, Stasi

Hans Sommer (born 26 June 1914, date of death unknown) was a German member of the Sicherheitsdienst during World War II. After the war, he found a working relationship with Gehlen Organisation [V Agent # 2857] and was subsequently a spy for the Stasi, East Germany's secret police.

== Biography ==
Born in Nortorf on 26 June 1914, Sommer joined the Hitler Youth at sixteen, and joined the SS #119 157 (1 December 1932) and NSDAP #1442457 (1 February 1933), respectively. He was chiefly in function of the Sicherheitsdienst (SD) before his service in the Wehrmacht (1936–1938). Afterwards, he became a deputy to Otto Somann at SD Leignitz, followed by a stint in Breslau. He was active in the occupation of Sudetenland. On his return to Germany, he went to work at the SD headquarters, for which he was later posted to Paris, France.

In October 1941, unbeknownst to his superiors, Sommer helped plan an attack on seven synagogues in Paris, inspired by the 1938 pogrom, in collaboration with Eugène Deloncle. A four-week suspension of pay resulted for "SS-unwürdigen Verhaltens (SS-unworthy behaviour)" and he would not find promotion in the next three years. He was subsequently posted to Marseille and Nice. He is also alleged to have been a spy for Krupp.

After the war, Sommer was captured by the Americans, who sought to employ him to infiltrate a Nazi ratline formed around Frenchman Charles Lescat, whom Sommer met in Madrid just before his capture. He was moved to Camp King, Oberursel, after convincing the Americans that such an attempt would be unsuccessful. From Camp King he was extradited to France to stand trial before a military court, which sentenced him to two years in prison. Sommer was released from prison and sent back to Germany in 1950.

Between 1950 and 1953, Sommer found himself working for the Gehlen Organization (GO), the unofficial West German intelligence organization. Unemployed in 1953, he started spying for the East German Stasi, handing over far-reaching details on his former West German employer.
