= Eugène Deloncle =

French politician (1890–1944)

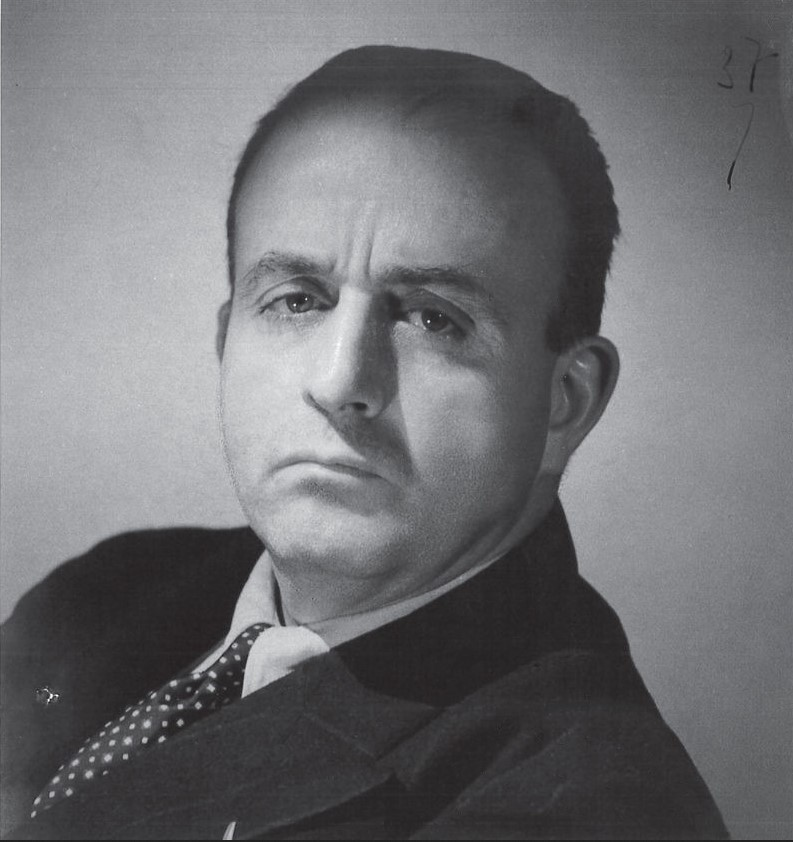
- Deloncle c. 1940
- Born: 20 June 1890; Brest, France
- Died: 17 January 1944 (aged 53); Paris, German-occupied France
- Cause of death: Gunshot wounds
- Occupations: Politician; Naval engineer
- Known for: Founder of La Cagoule
- Spouse: Mercedes Cahier
- Father: Louis Deloncle
- Relatives: François Deloncle (uncle)
- Awards: Legion of Honour (Chevalier)

Eugène Deloncle (20 June 1890 – 17 January 1944) was a French politician and fascist leader who founded the organisation "Secret Committee of Revolutionary Action" (CSAR), better known as La Cagoule. He became a prominent Nazi collaborator during World War II. Later on in the war, Deloncle, now doubtful that Germany would win, went into contact with the German resistance. He was later assassinated for these activities by SD agents.

== Early life and war service ==
Antoine Octave Eugène Deloncle was born on 20 June 1890 in Brest, Brittany, France. His parents were Antoine Charles Louis Deloncle and Anna Ange Marie.

His father died in tragic circumstances in 1898 when his son was 8. He was the captain of the French transatlantic liner SS La Bourgogne accidentally rammed in thick fog by the sailing ship Cromartyshire off Sable Island with a high death toll. Captain Deloncle did his best to organize rescue in difficult circumstances and refusing to leave the bridge went down with his ship. Eugène Deloncle was a graduate of the École Polytechnique, and worked as a naval engineer for the French Navy. He married Mercedes Cahier on 4 February 1918 in Paris.

=== World War I ===
Deloncle served as an artillery officer during World War I, including the Champagne frontline, where he was wounded.

== 1930s political activity ==
Initially supportive of the integralist Action Française, he left the movement in 1935 because of his perception of inaction by the older organisation in combating the French left. Deloncle founded his own group, the Comité Secret d'Action Révolutionnaire (CSAR), with similar political goals. The new group became well known by the epithet La Cagoule ('The Hood'), a term that was first applied by Charles Maurras and Maurice Pujo of Action Française, as the group's tactics reminded them of the American Ku Klux Klan; the name was subsequently embraced by the press. The Cagoule was a fascist and anti-communist terrorist group that kept the Orleanist and strongly anti-republican line of the Action Française, but added the rhetoric of fascism. It was formed to overthrow the leftist Popular Front government of Léon Blum. In the 1930s the Cagoule was responsible for assassinations, including those of the antifascist activists and Italian refugees, Carlo Rosselli and his brother Nello in June 1937, and terrorist attacks, including the bombing of several Paris synagogues.

== World War II and death ==
In 1940, with the Fall of France during World War II and the German period of occupation, Deloncle created a movement backing Philippe Pétain's "French State", the Mouvement Social Révolutionnaire (MSR, 'Social Revolutionary Movement'). MSR, a more radical form of the Cagoule, strongly supported Pétain's social conservatism and reactionary aims; it viewed with approval the political experiment that was being engineered in Vichy France in the south of the country. Afterwards, he approached the National Popular Rally (RNP) of Marcel Déat, but conflicts with Déat saw him expelled in May 1942, when he was succeeded as leader by Jean Fontenoy.

In October 1941, unbeknownst to his superiors, SS Officer Hans Sommer helped plan an attack on seven synagogues in Paris, inspired by the 1938 pogrom, in collaboration with Eugène Deloncle.

By 1942, Deloncle became doubtful of the inevitability of German victory and became a member of François Darlan's secret staff; he was in contact with Abwehr head Wilhelm Canaris. Deloncle's involvement with the Abwehr made him an enemy of the Gestapo. Initially, he was arrested in August 1943, interrogated and detained for a month in Ville-d'Avray. Once released, he renewed contact with Canaris, sustaining the Gestapo's enmity. On 17 January 1944, Deloncle's house was swarmed by SD agents and he was killed in a shootout.

== Awards ==
On 16 June 1920, Deloncle was made a Chevalier (Knight) of the Legion of Honour.
