= Jean Filiol =

French militant (1909 – unknown)

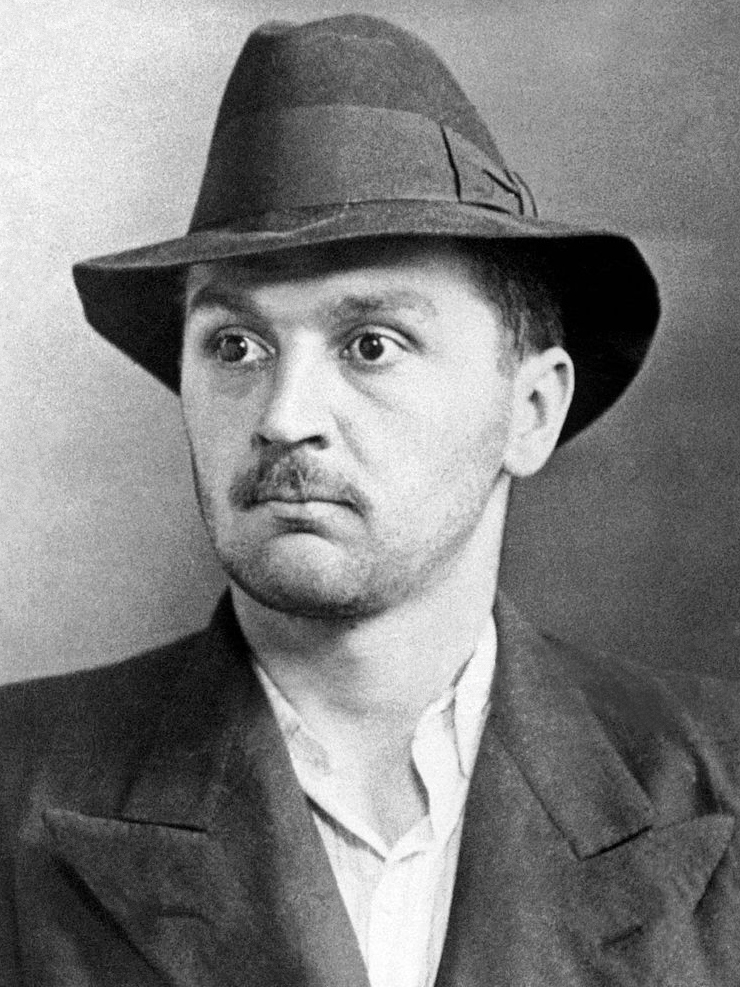
- Filiol in 1938
- Born: 9 May 1909; Dordogne, France

Jean Paul Robert Filiol (9 May 1909 – date of death unknown) was a French militant, who was active in La Cagoule before the Second World War. After the war, he fled to Spain, where he worked for the local office of L'Oréal.

Filliol was one of the founding members of La Cagoule, after being previously a member of the Camelots du Roi. He was one of suspects in the killing of the Italian anti-fascists Carlo and Nello Rosselli in 1937, for which a French court sentenced him to death in absentia in 1948. Filliol was interned in 1942, but released in 1944, on the orders of Joseph Darnand. After the war he fled to Spain which refused to extradite him to stand trial in France.
