= Jean Boissel =

French architect (1891–1951)

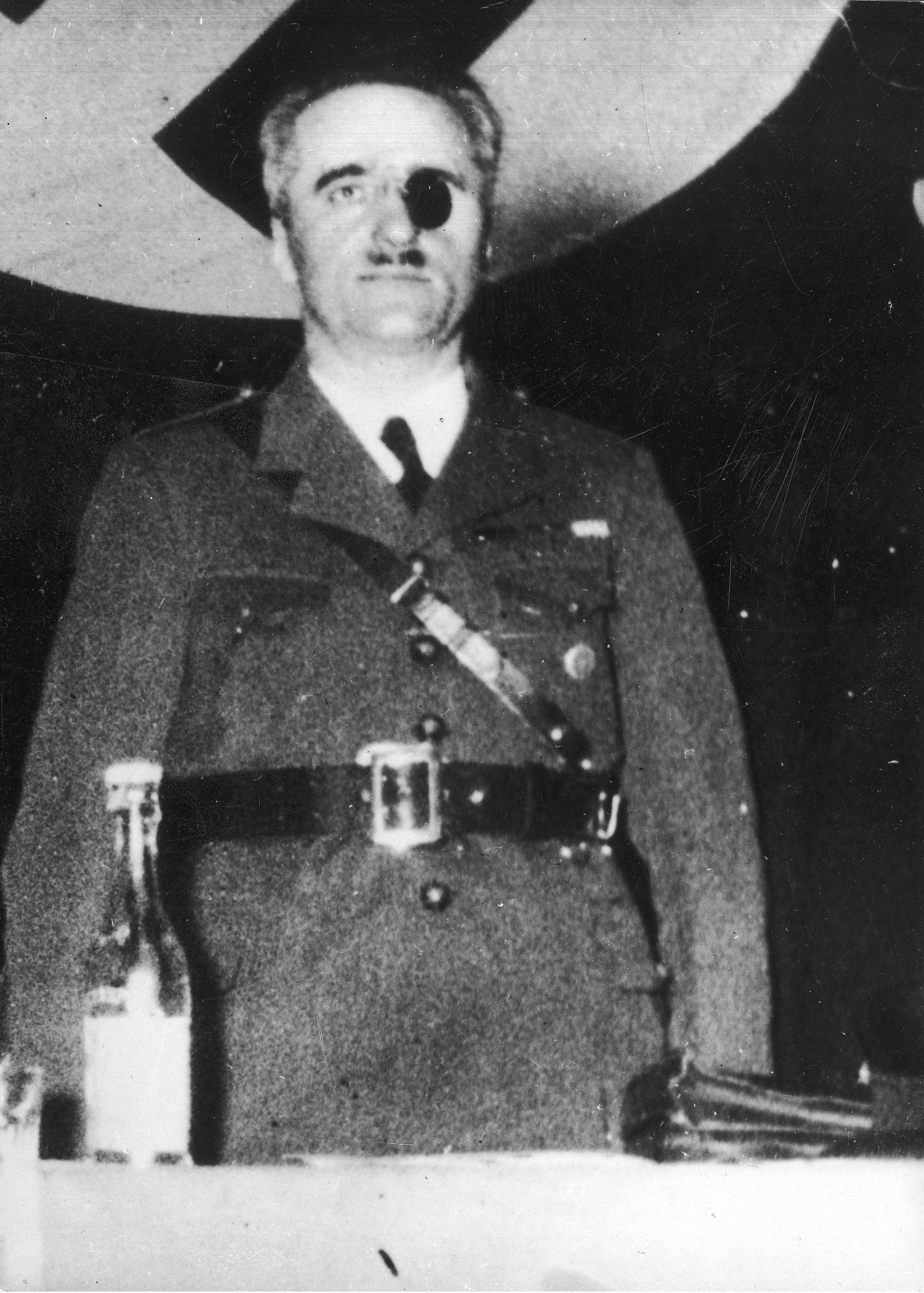
- Jean Boissel c. 1930–1938
- Born: Anselme Joseph Médéric Marie Boissel; 1 May 1891; Bains, Haute-Loire, France
- Died: 19 October 1951 (aged 60); Fresnes Prison, Fresnes, Val-de-Marne, France
- Occupations: Architect, political activist, journalist
- Years active: 1920s-1940s
- Organization: Le Front Franc
- Criminal charge: Collaborationism
- Criminal penalty: Death (commuted to imprisonment)

Jean Boissel (born Anselme Joseph Médéric Marie Boissel; 1 May 1891 – 19 October 1951) was a French architect, journalist, and far right political activist who was convicted of collaboration with Nazi Germany during World War II.

A disabled veteran of World War I, Boissel founded Le Front Franc and the Paris-based periodical Le Réveil du peuple ("Revival of the People"), which espoused anti-Masonic, anti-parliamentarian, and "antijudéométèque" views. Originally sentenced to death after the war, Boissel died in prison after having his sentence commuted to life imprisonment.

== Life ==
Anselme Joseph Médéric Marie Boissel was born in Bains. His father was a policeman.

Boissel fought in World War I; he was severely injured and received the Croix de Guerre. He was the architect of many buildings, mainly villas in Le Touquet-Paris-Plage, some of which are classified in the general inventory of French architectural heritage.

=== Politics ===
Boissel came to be heavily influenced by the ethno-racialist concepts of Arthur de Gobineau. He became active in political journalism and, in 1933, he published a book titled Les Croix de sang ("The Cross of Blood"). In 1934, he undertook the founding of a far-right league called Racisme international fascisme, later renamed Le Front franc ("The French Front"). Starting in March 1936, Boissel founded the Paris-based periodical Le Réveil du peuple, which he edited as an organ of the Front.

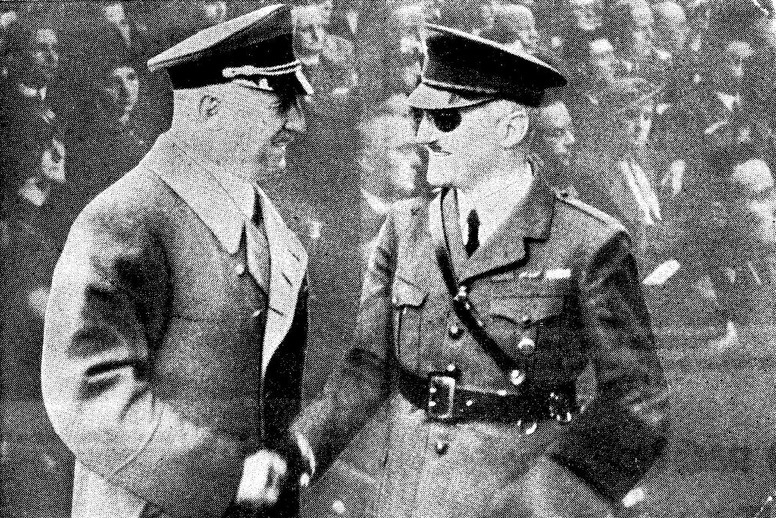
Boissel (right) with Julius Streicher.

Boissel established contacts with the leaders of the German Nazi Party. In May 1935, he went to Nuremberg to participate in the congress of the Universal Anti-Jewish League (La Ligue Antijuive Universelle) alongside Julius Streicher, and in 1936 he was received by Adolf Hitler. He corresponded with Theodor Kessemeier, head of the Deutscher Fichte-Bund.

Boissel was sentenced to four months in prison in 1938 for uttering death threats against Prime Minister Léon Blum in Le Réveil du peuple. The following year he defended Roger Cazy, regional delegate of the Front franc, who was jailed for spreading Nazi propaganda in Arras. In October 1939, under Prime Minister Édouard Daladier, he was arrested on suspicion of collaboration with the Germans and imprisoned. After the occupation of France by German troops, he was released on 10 July 1940. In mid-1941, he became a member of the Central Committee of the Legion of French Volunteers against Bolshevism and led its recruitment campaign.

In contrast to Marcel Déat, Jacques Doriot, or Eugène Deloncle, Boissel took a secondary role in the collaboration. He chaired a collaborationist splinter groupuscule, l'Union des forces françaises ("the Union of French Forces"), which organized a "pilgrimage" to the grave of anti-Semitic polemicist Édouard Drumont in February 1943.

Under the occupation, Boissel resumed leadership of the Front, and revived Le Réveil du peuple in 1943 (its last issue appeared on 16 August 1944).

After the liberation of France by Allied troops in 1944, he was arrested for collaboration with the Nazis and sentenced to death on 28 June 1946. His property was confiscated and he was removed from the Legion of Honour. His sentence was commuted to life in prison on December 2. He died in prison on 19 October 1951.

== Architectural achievements ==
=== Poste du Touquet ===
Boissel designed the Hôtel des postes du Touquet-Paris-Plage, which functions as a post office in Le Touquet (photos here and here).

Boissel won a competition organized by the municipality (beating the architects Louis Quetelart and Albert Pouthier). Boissel wanted to preserve the memory that it was built on the site of the former Church of Saint-Jean, with the inclusion of a small bell tower. It was built in 1927 by the Delcourt Brothers. Contributors to the project included the ceramist Delassus, and the glass painter Jeannin Gaëtan.

It was designated a historical monument on 12 May 1997.

=== Villas ===
- Banco
- Blanc-Mesnil
- Carte Blanche
- Clarendon House
- Forêt bleue
- Loin des flots (renamed Oxer in 1946). Built around 1925. Oxer is a term for an obstacle on a racetrack; this name was chosen by the owner of the villa, a lover of horse riding.
- Mamette
- La Marotte (renamed Le Manoir des Pins). Built in the early 20th century.
- L'Oiseau bleu
- Pare-Brise
- Sable d'Or
- Sainte-Thérèse

== In popular culture ==
In Louis-Ferdinand Céline's 1957 novel Castle to Castle, the character Neuneuil is thought to be based on Boissel.

== Works ==
- Les Croix de sang ([The Cross of Blood]), special printing by Éditions Rénovation, 1933. 255-page book. New edition under the title: Les Croix de sang: Recueil d'opinions ([The Cross of Blood: Collection of Opinions]), Paris: Steff, 1934. 16-page booklet.
- Le juif, poison mortel: Conférence donnée... le 4 janvier 1935 ([The Jew, Deadly Poison: Lecture... on 4 January 1935]), Impr. du Cantal, 1935. 40-page booklet.
- Die Blutkreuzler: Ein Buch v. Helden, Konjunkturrittern, Idealisten ([The Bloodcrosser: A Book of Heroes, Economic-Knights, Idealists]), O. F. Hübner, 1938. 120-page booklet.
- L'Appel à la France: lancé par Jean Boissel le 30 juin 1938 ([Call to France: Launched from Jean Boissel on 30 June 1938]), Paris: Éditions du Réveil du peuple, 1941. 8-page pamphlet.
- Charte du Front Franc ([Charter of the Front Franc]), précédée d'un Appel à la France, introduction de A. Féval, Paris: Éditions du Réveil du peuple, 1941
- La Crise, oeuvre juive: manière de la conjurer ([The Depression, Jewish Work: How to Avert It]), Éditions du Réveil du peuple, 1941. 24-page pamphlet.
- Mon discours de Nüremberg (9 mai 1935): "la paix des anciens combattants ([My Nuremberg speech (9 May 1935): "The Peace Veterans"]), with Alphonse de Châteaubriant, Éditions du Réveil du peuple, 1941. 27-page pamphlet.
- Souvenirs de mes prisons ([Memories of My Prisons]), foreword by Roger Cazy, Paris: Éditions du Réveil du peuple, 1941.
