= 33rd Waffen Grenadier Division of the SS Charlemagne =

French units of the Waffen-SS

33rd Waffen Grenadier Division of the SS Charlemagne (1st French)
- 33. Waffen-Grenadier-Division der SS "Charlemagne" (französische Nr. 1)
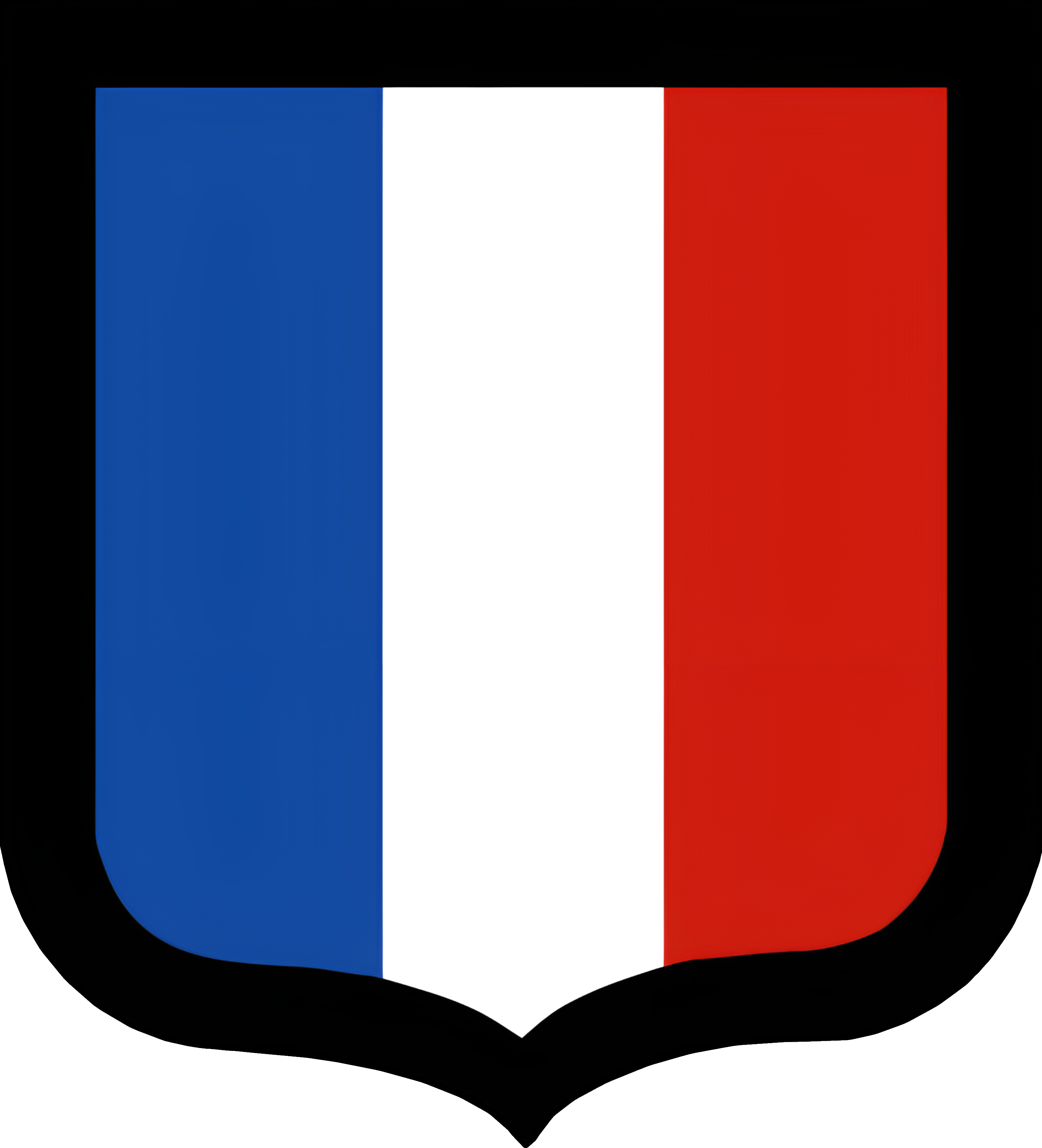
- Representation of the Waffen-SS tricolour insignia worn on the left arm by some French volunteers
- Active: 1944–1945
- Allegiance: Nazi Germany
- Branch: (Schutzstaffel) Waffen-SS
- Type: Infantry brigade, later reclassified as division
- Size: 7,340 men (February 1945)
- Engagements: World War II; Eastern Front; East Pomeranian Offensive; Battle of Kolberg; Battle in Berlin

Commanders
- Notable commanders: Edgar Puaud; Gustav Krukenberg

The Waffen Grenadier Brigade of the SS Charlemagne (German: Waffen-Grenadier-Brigade der SS "Charlemagne") was a Waffen-SS unit formed in September 1944 from French collaborationists, many of whom were already serving in various other German units.

Named after the 9th-century Frankish emperor, the Charlemagne Brigade superseded two units of French volunteers already serving within the Wehrmacht and Waffen-SS, namely the Legion of French Volunteers Against Bolshevism and SS-Volunteer Sturmbrigade France (SS-Freiwilligen Sturmbrigade "Frankreich"). The division also included French recruits from other German military and paramilitary formations and Miliciens who had fled ahead of the Allied Liberation of France (June–November 1944).

After training, the Charlemagne Brigade was reclassified as a division named 33rd Waffen Grenadier Division of the SS Charlemagne (1st French) (33. Waffen-Grenadier-Division der SS "Charlemagne" (französische Nr. 1)). It had 7,340 men at the time of its deployment to the Eastern Front in February 1945. It fought against Soviet forces in Pomerania where it was almost annihilated during the East Pomeranian Offensive within a month. Around 400 members of the unit participated in the Battle in Berlin in April–May 1945 and were among the last Axis forces to surrender.

== Background ==
=== Legion of French Volunteers Against Bolshevism ===
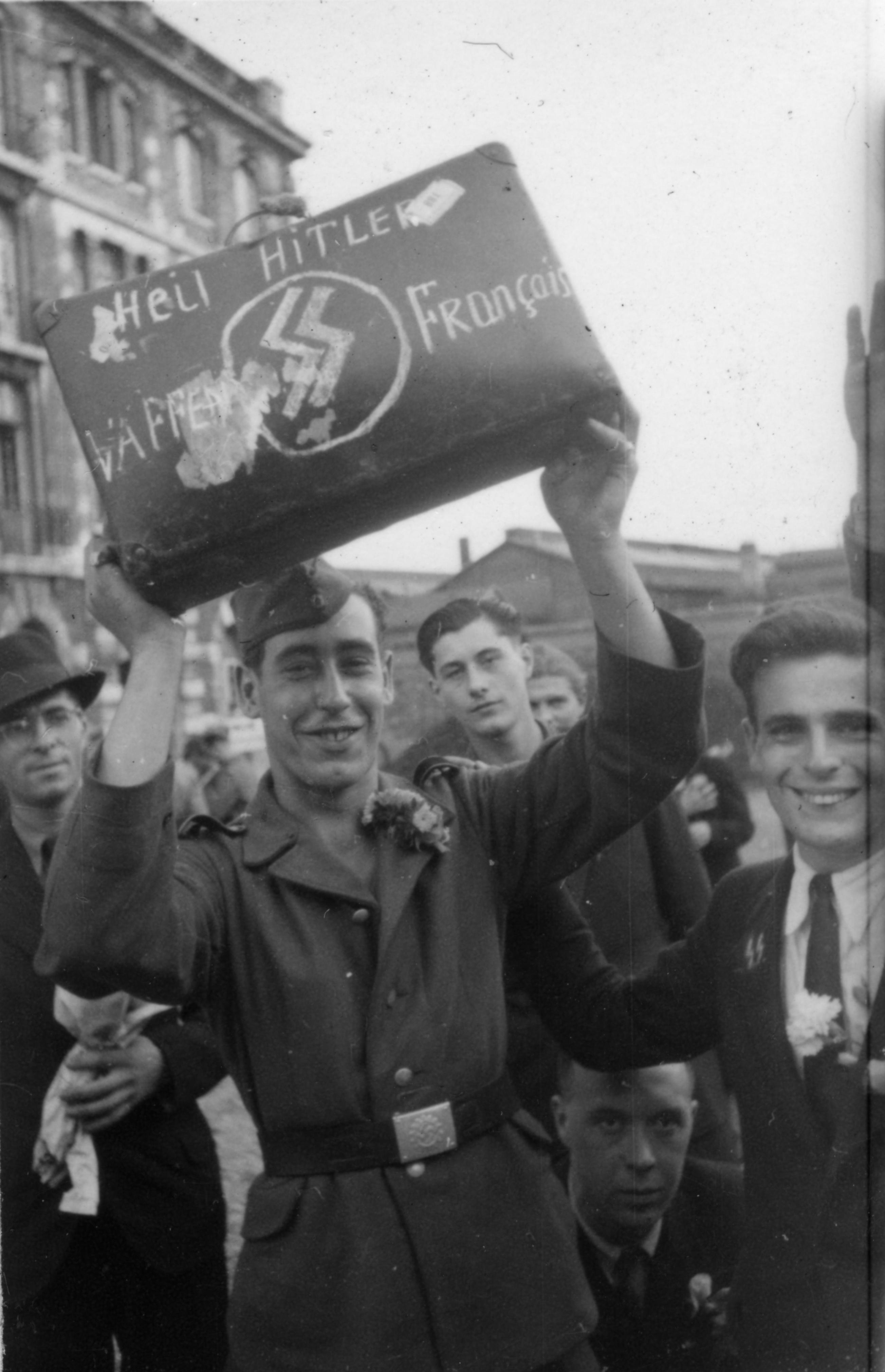
A French recruit for the SS-Volunteer Sturmbrigade France departing from Paris in October 1943

The Legion of French Volunteers Against Bolshevism (Légion des Volontaires Français contre le Bolchévisme, or LVF) was a Wehrmacht unit formed shortly after the German invasion of the Soviet Union in June 1941 by a coalition of small far-right political factions within Vichy France. Although its supporters were more explicitly supportive of Nazi ideology and close collaboration with Nazi Germany than the Vichy regime itself, the German authorities remained sceptical of incorporating French soldiers and limited the unit's size significantly. Furthermore, it recruited only 5,800 men between 1941 and its disbandment in 1944. The Vichy regime also kept it at arm's length. The LVF participated in the Battle of Moscow in November–December 1941 but suffered heavy casualties and performed poorly in combat. For most of its existence, it was confined to so-called "bandit-fighting" operations (Bandenbekämpfung) behind the front line in German-occupied Byelorussia and Ukraine. The Tricolour Legion (Légion Tricolore) formed in France with Vichy support was later also absorbed into the LVF. In early 1944, the unit again took part in rear-security operations. In June 1944, following the collapse of Army Group Centre's front during the Red Army's summer offensive, the LVF was attached to the 4th SS Police Regiment.

=== SS Volunteer Sturmbrigade France ===
The SS Volunteer Sturmbrigade France (SS-Freiwilligen Sturmbrigade "Frankreich") was formed in July 1943 as the first French formation permitted within the Waffen-SS. SS-Obersturmbannführer Paul-Marie Gamory-Dubourdeau led it and had previously served in the Foreign Legion. It attracted around 3,000 applicants in German-occupied France, many of whom were existing members of the collaborationist paramilitary Milice or university students. Official requirements were that recruits be "free of Jewish blood" and between 20 and 25 years old. The approximately 1,600 men of the Sturmbrigade were attached to the 18th SS Volunteer Panzergrenadier Division Horst Wessel and sent to Galicia on the Eastern Front. In heavy fighting against the Red Army, 7 officers and 130 men were killed, while 8 officers and 661 men were wounded.

== Formation ==
The LVF and the Brigade Frankreich were disbanded in September 1944 in the aftermath of the Allied Liberation of France. Their soldiers were folded into a new unit created the same month, called the Waffen Grenadier Brigade of the SS Charlemagne (Waffen-Grenadier-Brigade der SS Charlemagne). Joining them were French collaborators fleeing the Allied advance in the west, as well as Frenchmen from the German Navy, the National Socialist Motor Corps (NSKK), the Organisation Todt and the Milice security police who had fled ahead of the Allied forces. SS-Brigadeführer Gustav Krukenberg was appointed to command the division, while Edgar Puaud, who had commanded the LVF, was the nominal French commander. The two main infantry regiments were designated as the 57th and 58th Regiments. Members of the LVF were the nucleus of the former, and the Sturmbrigade formed the core of the latter. The LVF also manned the artillery battalion, the headquarters company and the engineer company. In February 1945, the unit was officially upgraded to a division and renamed to SS Division Charlemagne. At this time, it had a strength of 7,340 men: 1,200 from the LVF, 1,000 from the Sturmbrigade, 2,500 from the Milice, 2,000 from the NSKK, and 640 former Kriegsmarine and naval police.

== Operational history ==
=== Pomerania, February–April 1945 ===
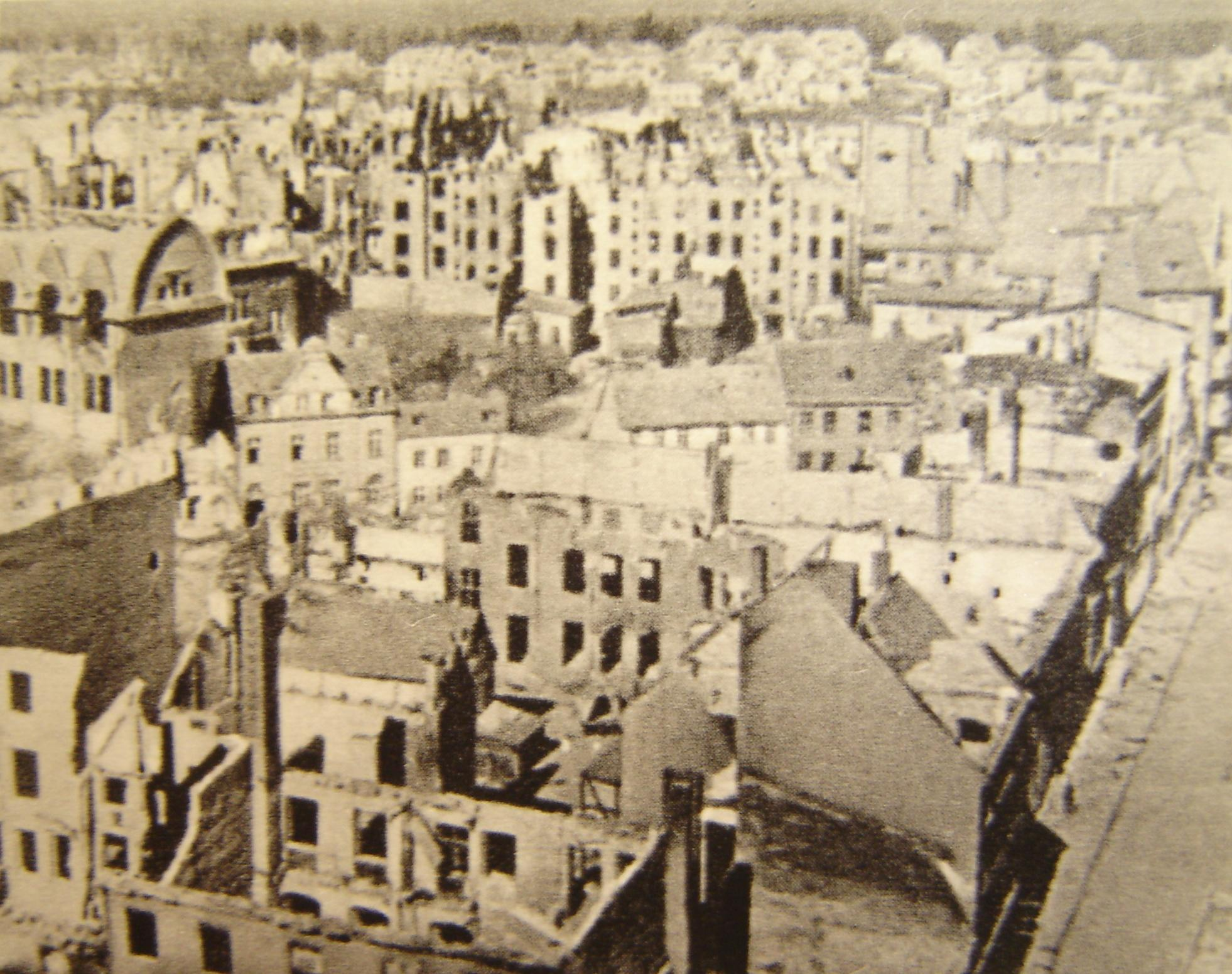
View of Kolberg (Kołobrzeg) in Pomerania after its capture by Soviet forces in March 1945

The division was sent to fight the Red Army in Poland, but on 25 February it was attacked at Hammerstein (present-day Czarne) in Pomerania by troops of the Soviet 1st Belorussian Front. The Soviet forces split the French force into three pockets. One group with Puaud was destroyed by Soviet artillery, and a second group tried fighting its way back westward, but by 17 March all had been captured or killed in action. A third group commanded by Krukenberg survived. It was evacuated from the coast by the German Navy to Denmark and later sent to Neustrelitz for refitting.

By early April 1945, Krukenberg commanded only about 700 men organised into a single infantry regiment with two battalions (Battalions 57 and 58) and one heavy support battalion without equipment. He released about 400 men to serve in a construction battalion; the remaining about 350 chose to go to Berlin. On 23 April, the Reich Chancellery in Berlin ordered Krukenberg to proceed to the capital with his men, who were reorganised as Assault Battalion (Sturmbataillon) Charlemagne. As the men assembled at the Marktplatz of Alt-Strelitz, a black Mercedes approached fast. As the car went past the column of men, Krukenberg and several other officers quickly stood at attention, recognising Reichsführer-SS Heinrich Himmler, who had just come from a private meeting with Count Folke Bernadotte at the Swedish consulate in Lübeck to offer surrender terms to the Western Allies. The SS men were disappointed that Himmler did not stop and instead sped on past.

=== Berlin, April–May 1945 ===
The French SS troops arrived in Berlin on 24 April after a long detour to avoid advance columns of the Red Army. Although estimates vary, around 100 men remaining in the SS Division Charlemagne participated in the Battle in Berlin. On 25 April, Krukenberg was appointed the commander of (Berlin) Defence Sector C, which included SS Division Nordland, whose previous commander, Joachim Ziegler, was relieved of his command earlier the same day. Charlemagne was attached to Nordland, whose two regiments had been decimated in the fighting. Both equaled roughly a battalion. The Frenchmen walked from West to East Berlin, to a brewery near Hermannplatz. Here fighting began, with Hitler Youth firing Panzerfausts at Soviet tanks belonging to advance guards near the Tempelhof Airport.

Supported by Tiger II tanks and the 11th SS Panzer Battalion, men of Charlemagne took part in a counterattack on the morning of 26 April in Neukölln. The counterattack ran into an ambush by Soviet troops using a captured German Panther tank. The regiment lost half of the available troops in Neukölln on the first day. It later defended Neukölln's Town Hall. Because Soviet combat groups had penetrated Neukölln deeply, Krukenberg prepared fallback positions for Sector C defenders around Hermannplatz. He moved his headquarters into the opera house. As SS Division Nordland withdrew toward Hermannplatz, the French under Hauptsturmführer Henri Joseph Fenet and some attached Hitler Youth destroyed fourteen Soviet tanks; one machine-gun position by the Halensee bridge held up Soviet forces for 48 hours.

The Soviet advance into Berlin followed a pattern of massive shelling followed by assaults using house-clearing battle groups of about 80 men in each, with tank escorts and close artillery support. On 27 April, the remnants of Nordland were pushed back into the central government district (Zitadelle sector) in Defence Sector Z. There, Krukenberg's Nordland headquarters was a carriage in the Stadtmitte U-Bahn station. Fighting was very heavy, and, by 28 April, 108 Soviet tanks had been destroyed in the southeast of Berlin within the S-Bahn. The French squads under Fenet's command accounted for "about half" of the tanks. Fenet and his battalion were given the area of Neukölln, Belle Alliance Platz, Wilhelmstrasse and the Friedrichstrasse to defend. On 28 April, the Red Army started a full-scale offensive into the central sector. Charlemagne was in the centre of the battle zone around the Reich Chancellery. French SS man Eugène Vaulot, who had destroyed two tanks in Neukölln, claimed to have destroyed six more near the Führerbunker. Krukenberg awarded him the Knight's Cross of the Iron Cross on 29 April. Vaulot was killed three days later by a Red Army sniper. Second Lieutenant Roger Albert-Brunet destroyed four Soviet tanks by Panzerfaust on 29 April 1945. He was awarded the Iron Cross 1st class by Krukenberg. During the fighting, Fenet was wounded in the foot. The Soviet forces drove what was left of the battalion back to the vicinity of the Reich Aviation Ministry in the central government district under the command of SS-Brigadeführer Wilhelm Mohnke. For the combat actions of the battalion during the Battle in Berlin, Mohnke awarded the Knight's Cross of the Iron Cross to Fenet on 29 April 1945.

By 30 April, the last defenders in the area of the bunker complex were mainly made up of Frenchmen of the SS Division Charlemagne, others being Waffen-SS men from the SS Division Leibstandarte, SS Division Nordland, Latvian SS and Spanish SS from the Blue Legion. A group of French SS remained in the area of the bunker until the early morning of 2 May. By the evening of 30 April, the French SS men serving under Fenet had destroyed another 21 Soviet tanks and used up a large number of the Panzerfaust reserves from the Reich Chancellery. On the night of 1 May, Krukenberg told the men who remained to split into small groups and try to break out. Reduced to approximately thirty troops, most French SS men surrendered near the Potsdamer rail station to the Red Army. Krukenberg made it to Dahlem, where he hid out in an apartment for a week before surrendering to Red Army troops.

After escaping Berlin, Fenet, with a small remainder of his unit, surrendered to British forces at Bad Kleinen and Wismar. Some of the Frenchmen, such as Fenet, were turned over to the Soviet Army. Twelve of those turned over to French authorities by the U.S. Army were summarily executed on the orders of General Philippe Leclerc de Hauteclocque. Fenet was allowed to be treated for his foot wound at a hospital. He was then returned to a Soviet POW camp and, a short time later, released. Most of the rest who made it to France were apprehended and sent to Allied prisons and camps. Fenet was arrested when he returned to France. In 1949, Fenet was convicted of being a collaborator and sentenced to 20 years of forced labour, but was released from prison in 1959.

== Commanders ==
- SS-Oberführer Edgar Puaud (?? August 1944 – February 1945)
- SS-Brigadeführer Gustav Krukenberg (February – 25 April 1945)
- SS-Standartenführer Walter Zimmermann (25 April – 8 May 1945)

== Notable personnel ==
- Charles Gastaut, alias Charles Luca – former soldier and leading figure in post-war far-right paramilitary movements in France
- Christian de La Mazière (1922–2006) – former soldier and one of the protagonists interviewed at length in the landmark documentary The Sorrow and the Pity (1969)
- Léon Gaultier (1915-1997) – former junior officer (Untersturmführer) active in post-war far-right politics as a propaganda advisor to the far-right candidate Jean-Louis Tixier-Vignancour in the 1965 presidential elections and subsequently political ally of Jean-Marie Le Pen and leading figure in the National Front (Front national) from 1972
- Marc Augier (1908–1990), alias "Saint-Loup" – former soldier and far-right journalist involved in supporting white minority rule in Southern Africa who wrote a number of popular exculpatory books about the Waffen-SS
- Pierre Bousquet (1919–1991) – former section leader (Rottenführer), active in post-war neo-Nazi politics in France and subsequently treasurer and co-founder of the National Front
- René Binet (1913–1957) – a former soldier described as "one of the French extreme right's most energetic and venomous propagandists in the immediate post-war years" and an influential theorist of white supremacism

== See also ==
- Waffen-SS foreign volunteers and conscripts
- Sigmaringen enclave, a short-lived Vichy government in exile active from September 1944 to April 1945
- List of German divisions in World War II
- List of Waffen-SS divisions
- List of SS personnel
- List of military units named after people
