= Eugène Vaulot =

French SS non-commissioned officer

- Born: 1 June 1923; Paris, France
- Died: 2 May 1945 (aged 21); Berlin, Nazi Germany
- Military career
- Allegiance: Nazi Germany
- Branch: (Schutzstaffel) Waffen-SS
- Service years: 1941–45
- Rank: Unterscharführer
- Unit: 33rd Waffen Grenadier Division of the SS Charlemagne (1st French)
- Conflicts: World War II
- Awards: Knight's Cross of the Iron Cross; Iron Cross 1st Class; Iron Cross 2nd Class; Tank Destruction Badge

Eugène Vaulot (1 June 1923 – 2 May 1945) was a Frenchman with the rank of Unterscharführer in the Waffen-SS during World War II, who was awarded the Knight's Cross of the Iron Cross.

== Life ==
Eugene Vaulot was born in Paris in 1923. He trained to be a "plumber-heating" technician, then volunteered to join the Legion of French Volunteers Against Bolshevism (LVF) in 1941 and fought on the Eastern Front. In 1942–43, he served with the 1st company. He was awarded the Iron Cross 2nd Class before being partially disabled from wounds which forced him to leave the L.V.F. in 1943 with the rank of Obergefreiter.

In 1944 he volunteered for service with the German Navy (Kriegsmarine) and served with the 6th Company, 28th Schiffstammabteilung. In September 1944, a new unit, the Waffen-Grenadier-Brigade der SS "Charlemagne", was formed out of the remnants of the LVF and the French Sturmbrigade. Vaulot transferred to this new formation with the rank of Waffen-Unterscharführer. Joining him were French collaborators fleeing the Allied advance in the west, as well as Frenchmen from the German Navy, the National Socialist Motor Corps (NSKK), the Organisation Todt and the Milice security police.

In February 1945, the unit was officially upgraded to a division and renamed 33rd Waffen Grenadier Division of the SS Charlemagne (1st French) (französische Nr.1). At this time it had a strength of 7,340 men. The Charlemagne Division was sent to fight the Red Army in Poland, but on 25 February it was attacked at Hammerstein (present day Czarne) in Pomerania, by troops of the Soviet 1st Belorussian Front. The Soviet forces split the French force into three pockets. One group commanded by SS-Brigadeführer Gustav Krukenberg survived. It was evacuated from the coast by the German Navy to Denmark and later sent to Neustrelitz for refitting; Vaulot was part of this third group. He was awarded the Iron Cross 1st Class for "distinguishing himself" in combat.

=== Berlin, 1945 ===
In April 1945, about 350 men volunteered to go to fight in the Battle of Berlin in a unit which became known as Sturmbataillon Charlemagne. Vaulot went with the group to Berlin. During the fighting, Vaulot destroyed two tanks in the Neukölln sector. Then on 28 April, the Red Army started a full-scale offensive into the central sector. Fighting was intense; the Sturmbataillon Charlemagne was in the center of the battle zone around the Reich Chancellery. Vaulot destroyed six more tanks by Panzerfaust near the Führerbunker. He was awarded the Knight's Cross of the Iron Cross by SS-Brigadeführer Krukenberg on 29 April. (Note: Knight's Cross of the Iron Cross on 29 April 1945 as Waffen-Unterscharführer and as group leader in the 33. SS-Freiwilligen-Division "Charlemagne" (franz. Nr. 1) in the combat area Groß Berlin (greater Berlin). Fellgiebel (2000) p. 429. Scherzer (2007) p. 756.) Vaulot was killed three days later in the early hours of 2 May by a Red Army sniper.
