= Henri Fenet =

French Waffen-SS captain (1919–2002)

- Born: 11 July 1919; Ceyzériat, France
- Died: 14 September 2002 (aged 83); Paris, France
- Conviction: Treason
- Penalty: 20 years imprisonment with hard labour
- Military career
- Allegiance: France; Vichy France; Nazi Germany
- Branch: (France) French Army; Milice française Waffen-SS
- Service years: 1940–1945
- Rank: Hauptsturmführer
- Unit: SS Division Charlemagne
- Conflicts: World War II
- Awards: Croix de Guerre; Knight's Cross of the Iron Cross

Henri Joseph Fenet (11 July 1919 – 14 September 2002) was a French collaborator who served in the Milice française before joining the Waffen-SS during World War II. As the surviving battalion commander of SS Charlemagne, Fenet was part of the last defenders in the area of the Reich Chancellery and Hitler's Führerbunker in April–May 1945. After the war, he was sentenced to 20 years imprisonment with hard labour in 1949. He was released in 1959 and died on 14 September 2002.

== French service ==
Henri Joseph Fenet was born on 11 July 1919 in France. Prior to World War II he studied literature at the University of Paris. At the outbreak of war he volunteered for the French Army and was commissioned as an officer with the rank of lieutenant. He was wounded twice and decorated with the Croix de Guerre. Following the capitulation of France he chose to stay and join the Armistice Army of Vichy France serving in a colonial regiment, the 1st Senegalese Tirailleurs in Mauritania until October 1942. On his return Fenet joined the newly formed collaborationist paramilitary Milice before volunteering in October 1943 for the Waffen-SS.

== Waffen-SS ==
In July 1943 Paul Marion, the Vichy Propaganda Minister, began a nationwide recruitment for the Waffen-SS in France. The Comité des Amis de la Waffen S.S. (Committee of the Friends of the Waffen-SS) was established by the minister and proceeded to actively recruit men who were between the ages of 20–25, "free of Jewish blood," and physically fit. Roughly 3000 applied to the assorted offices in the first few months, many of them college students. The organization also spent much time trying to recruit experienced French officers, like Fenet, to the organization. In October 1943, Fenet volunteered for the Waffen-SS and was sent to the SS school at Bad Tölz. In March 1944 he received the rank of Obersturmführer (senior assault leader, equivalent of first lieutenant) in the Waffen-SS and was given command of a company of the newly formed 8th SS Assault Brigade Frankreich.

In September 1944, Fenet and his company were sent to Könitz, West Prussia, where they joined other French recruits to form a new brigade-sized formation, later known as the SS Division Charlemagne. Joining them were French collaborators fleeing the Allied advance in the west, as well as Frenchmen from the German Navy, the National Socialist Motor Corps (NSKK), the Organisation Todt and the detested Milice security police. In February 1945, the unit was officially upgraded to a division. At this time it had a strength of 7,340 men. Fenet was named the commander of a battalion, which he led until April 1945.

The unit was sent to fight the Soviet Red Army in Poland, but by 25 February it was attacked at Hammerstein (present day Czarne) in Pomerania, by troops of the 1st Belorussian Front. The Soviet forces split the French force into three pockets. In heavy fighting against the Soviet Red Army, 7 officers and 130 men were killed, while 8 officers and 661 men were wounded. Fenet's battalion was part of one of the groups that was able to break out and return to the German lines. They were evacuated by the German Navy to Denmark and later sent to Neustrelitz.

=== Berlin, 1945 ===
On 23 April 1945, the Reich Chancellery in Berlin ordered Brigadeführer Gustav Krukenberg to proceed to the capital. About 350 men from the remains of the Charlemagne division chose to go to Berlin. The men had been reorganized as Sturmbataillon ("assault battalion") "Charlemagne" and was attached to the SS Division Nordland.

In the days which followed, fighting was very heavy and by 28 April, 108 Soviet tanks had been destroyed in the southeast of Berlin within the S-Bahn. The French squads under the command of Fenet accounted for "about half" of the tanks. Fenet, who was now wounded in the foot, withdrew with the battalion to the vicinity of the Reich Aviation Ministry in the central government district under the command of Wilhelm Mohnke. For the combat actions of the battalion during the Battle of Berlin, Fenet was awarded the Knight's Cross of the Iron Cross on 29 April 1945 by Mohnke. By the evening of 30 April, the French SS men serving under Fenet had destroyed another 21 Soviet tanks. SS Charlemagne and its remaining men under the command of Fenet, were one of the last units defending Hitler's Führerbunker. On 2 May 1945, most of the surviving Frenchmen left in Berlin surrendered to the Soviet Red Army. The rest, including Fenet, surrendered to British forces at Bad Kleinen and Wismar. Fenet was handed over to the Soviet Red Army, who put him in a prisoner of war camp and then let him be treated for his foot wound at hospital. He was then returned to a POW camp and a short time later released by the Soviets. Fenet was arrested upon his return to France.

== Later life ==
In 1949, Fenet was convicted of being a collaborator and sentenced to 20 years imprisonment with hard labour. He was released in 1959. After Fenet was released, he appeared in several documentary films and television programmes. He also ran a small independent auto business. Fenet died on 14 September 2002.

== Awards ==
- Croix de Guerre (France).
- Knight's Cross; 29 April 1945 (Nazi Germany).
