= Edgar Puaud =

French army officer

Edgar Joseph Alexandre Puaud
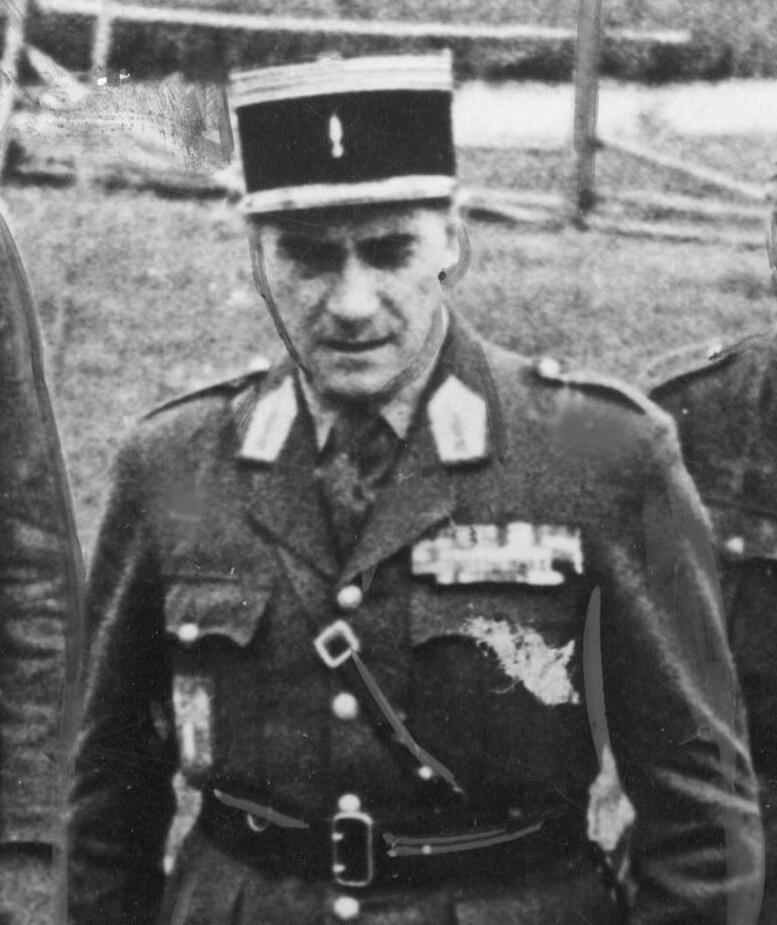
- Born: 29 October 1889; Orléans, France
- Died: 5 March 1945 (aged 55); Greifenberg, Germany
- Military career
- Allegiance: France; Nazi Germany
- Branch: French Army; German Army (Schutzstaffel) Waffen-SS
- Service years: 1909–1940; 1941–1945
- Rank: Oberführer
- Commands: Legion of French Volunteers Against Bolshevism; SS Division Charlemagne
- Conflicts: World War I World War II

Edgar Joseph Alexandre Puaud (29 October 1889 – 5 March 1945) was a French army officer, who, in 1945, briefly became commander of the Charlemagne Division, a French unit of the Waffen-SS in the service of Nazi Germany.

== World War I ==
Puaud was born in Orléans, and joined the French Army as a private soldier in 1909. By 1914 he was a sergeant, and was selected to attend the military academy at Saint-Maixent for petty officer training. On the outbreak of World War I, however, he and fellow "aspirants" were immediately given commissions. During the course of the war he was promoted from Sub-Lieutenant to Captain, and won the Croix de Guerre and the Legion of Honour. After 1918 he served with the French army of occupation in the Rhineland, then with the French Foreign Legion in Morocco, Syria and French Indochina.

== World War II ==
By 1939 he was a major, based at Septfonds in the south-west of France, and as a result did not see action during the German invasion of 1940. Following the French defeat in 1940, he served in the much-reduced "Armistice Army" in Vichy France.

Following the German invasion of the Soviet Union in June 1941, Puaud accepted the collaborationist argument that "Bolshevism" was a greater threat to French interests than the Germans. In October 1941, he joined the Legion of French Volunteers Against Bolshevism (Legion des Volontaires Français Contre le Bolchevisme, LVF) as a battalion commander.

The LVF was not a unit of the French Army, and was not under the control of the Vichy French government. It was part of the German Army and was officially known as Infantry Regiment 638. It had two battalions of 2,271 men with 181 officers and an additional staff of 35 German officers. They fought near Moscow in November 1941 as part of the 7th Infantry Division. The LVF lost half their men in action or through frostbite. In 1942, the remaining men were assigned to Bandenbekämpfung ("bandit-fighting" against partisan supporters and Jews), first around Bryansk and then in Ukraine.

=== Appointed commander ===
In September 1943 Puaud, promoted to Général de Brigade (brigadier), was appointed commander of the LVF. In July 1944 the Germans decided that all foreign volunteers fighting in the German Army should be transferred to the Waffen-SS. In September 1944, a new unit, the Waffen-Grenadier-Brigade der SS "Charlemagne" was formed out of the remnants of the LVF and French Sturmbrigade, both of which were disbanded. Joining them were French collaborators fleeing the Allied advance in the west, as well as Frenchmen from the German Navy, the National Socialist Motor Corps (NSKK), the Organisation Todt and the detested Milice française security police. The formation was named after the Frankish king and German Emperor Charlemagne. Puaud was given the Waffen-SS rank Oberführer. Although Puaud was the official commander, actual control was exercised by SS-Brigadeführer Gustav Krukenberg, who spoke fluent French.

After spending late 1944 training, the Charlemagne Brigade was upgraded to a division, with the title 33 Waffen-Grenadier-Division der SS "Charlemagne" (französische Nr 1), Krukenberg was appointed to command the division, while Puaud was the nominal French commander.

=== 1945 ===
In February 1945 the division was sent into combat against the advancing Red Army in Pomerania. It saw action around Hammerstein (Czarne), Köslin (Koszalin) and Kolberg (Kołobrzeg) on the Baltic coast. The Soviet forces split the French force into three pockets. One group commanded by Krukenberg survived. It was evacuated from the coast by the German Navy to Denmark and later sent to Neustrelitz for refitting; the second group with Puaud was destroyed by Soviet artillery and the third group tried fighting its way back westward, but by 17 March all had been captured or killed in action. Puaud was severely wounded in the fighting. He was taken to Greifenberg (Gryfice), where he was left in an inn with other wounded soldiers. His exact fate is not known.
