= Joachim Ziegler =

Waffen-SS Major General (1904–1945)

- Born: 18 October 1904; Hanau, Province of Hesse-Nassau, Kingdom of Prussia, German Empire
- Died: † 2 May 1945 (aged 40); Berlin, German Reich
- Military career
- Allegiance: Weimar Republic; Nazi Germany
- Branch: Reichswehr; German Heer; Waffen-SS
- Service years: 1923–1945
- Rank: SS-Brigadeführer and Generalmajor of the Waffen-SS
- Service number: SS #491,403
- Unit: SS Division Nordland
- Conflicts: Spanish Civil War; World War II: Poland Campaign; Battle of France; Operation Barbarossa; Defence of the Reich
- Awards: Spanish Cross; Knight's Cross of the Iron Cross with Oak Leaves

Joachim Ziegler (18 October 1904 – 2 May 1945) was a high-ranking commander in the Waffen-SS of Nazi Germany during World War II. He was a commander of the SS Division Nordland, and was a recipient of the Knight's Cross of the Iron Cross with Oak Leaves.

== Career ==
Joachim Ziegler was born in 1904, the son of a police officer. After graduating from Gymnasium with Abitur, he joined the Reichswehr as an officer candidate on 5 April 1923 and initially served in the 16th Cavalry Regiment. In 1935, he transferred to the 6th Panzer Regiment as commander of the 7th Company. From 30 September 1936 to 12 October 1937, he served as a volunteer with the Condor Legion. Ziegler was awarded the Spanish Cross for his participation in the Spanish Civil War.

In 1939, he served as the adjutant in the 3rd Panzer Brigade and on 23 September 1939 he was awarded the Iron Cross 2nd class followed by a 1st class award on 28 June 1940. On 14 March 1943 he was promoted to Oberst and served on the General Staff of the XXXXII Army Corps. He was awarded the German Cross in Gold on 15 March 1943 and was commanded by the Wehrmacht to the Waffen-SS on 15 June 1943. His SS number was 491,403. From 1 August 1943, Ziegler was the Chief of General Staff of the III (Germanic) SS Panzer Corps, and in November 1943 he was granted permission to wear an SS uniform for the duration of his command.

When Fritz von Scholz was killed in action on 28 July 1944, he was asked to take over command of the 11th SS Volunteer Panzergrenadier Division Nordland. On 5 September 1944, he was awarded the Knight's Cross for the conduct of the division in action and the Oak Leaves later in April 1945. The division retreated into what was known as the Courland Pocket. Soviet forces launched major offensives against the German units there. From late October to December 1944, the Nordland remained in the pocket; by early December the divisional strength was down to 9,000 men. In January 1945, the division was ordered to the Baltic port of Libau, where it was evacuated by sea.

During the Battle of Berlin, the Nordland division was positioned to the south-east of the city and to the east of Tempelhof Airport. On 25 April 1945, SS-Brigadeführer Gustav Krukenberg was appointed the commander of (Berlin) Defence Sector C, which included the Nordland Division. Ziegler was relieved of his command the same day. The exact reason for the transfer of the command is not clearly known. It was requested by General Helmuth Weidling, commander of the Berlin Defence Area.

After Hitler's death on 30 April, Krukenberg assembled most of his escort made up of French volunteers of the SS Sturmbataillon "Charlemagne" for the breakout to try and get through the Soviet Red Army encirclement of that area of Berlin. They joined up with Ziegler and a larger group of Nordland troops. They crossed the Spree just before dawn. Near the Gesundbrunnen U-Bahn station they came under heavy fire and Ziegler was wounded. Ziegler died from his wounds on 2 May 1945.

== Promotions ==
- 1 December 1926 Leutnant (2nd Lieutenant)
- 1 June 1929 Oberleutnant (1st Lieutenant)
- 1 January 1935 Hauptmann (Captain)
- 1 March 1940 Major
  - 15 October 1940 Major i. G. (appointed Major in General Staff)
- 1 February 1942 Oberstleutnant i. G. (Lieutenant Colonel in General Staff)
- 14 March 1943 Oberst i. G. (Colonel in General Staff) with effect and RDA from 1 January 1943 (54)
- 1 August 1943 SS-Oberführer
- 1 August 1944 SS-Brigadeführer und Generalmajor der Waffen-SS

== Awards and decorations ==
- Wehrmacht Long Service Award, 4th to 3rd Class on 2 October 1936
- Medal for the Campaign (Spain) of 1936−1939
- Condor Legion Tank Badge
- Spanish Cross in Gold with Swords on 31 May 1939
- Iron Cross (1939), 2nd and 1st Class
  - 2nd Class on 23 September 1939
  - 1st Class on 28 June 1940
- Winter Battle in the East 1941–42 Medal in August 1942
- German Cross in Gold on 14 March 1943 as Oberstleutnant im Generalstab (in the General Staff) of XXXIX. Panzerkorps
- Finnish Cross of Liberty, 1st Class in August 1943
- Knight's Cross of the Iron Cross with Oak Leaves
  - Knight's Cross on 5 September 1944 as SS-Brigadeführer and commander of the 11. SS-Freiwilligen-Panzergrenadier-Division Nordland
  - 848th Oak Leaves on 28 April 1945 as SS-Brigadeführer and commander of the 11. SS-Freiwilligen-Panzergrenadier-Division Nordland

== See also ==
- List SS-Brigadeführer

Military offices
Preceded by SS-Gruppenführer Fritz von Scholz	Commander of 11. SS-Freiwilligen-Panzergrenadier-Division "Nordland"; 27 July 1944 - 25 April 1945	Succeeded by SS-Brigadeführer Gustav Krukenberg
