= Villa La Prairie =

Coordinates: 50°30′26″N 1°36′11″E

Villa La Prairie is one of the most distinctive productions of French architect Louis Quételart. The villa is located in the golf area of Le Touquet, alongside other villas built in the 1920s and 1930s, of which one was owned by Somerset Maugham and P.G. Wodehouse.

Commonly referred to as La Prairie, the villa, built in 1928, is part of the French heritage inventory (Base Mérimée). It is of both Flemish and Picard influence, and unlike vast villas of that time of Anglo-Normand style, it has proved to embody the quintessential French villa, with large French window, big room sizes, and a living-room big enough to be called a ball room.
