= Gustav Krukenberg =

German Waffen-SS general

- Born: 8 March 1888; Bonn, Rhine Province, Kingdom of Prussia, German Empire
- Died: 23 October 1980 (aged 92); Bad Godesberg, North Rhine-Westphalia, West Germany
- Relatives: Alexander Conze (maternal grandfather); Werner Conze (cousin); Peter Schöttler (grandson)
- Military career
- Allegiance: German Empire; Nazi Germany
- Branch: Imperial German Army; German Army; Waffen-SS
- Service years: 1907–1918; 1939–1945
- Rank: SS-Brigadeführer
- Service number: NSDAP #1,067,635; SS #116,686
- Commands: SS Division Charlemagne; SS Division Nordland
- Conflicts: World War I World War II
- Awards: Iron Cross 1st Class; Iron Cross 2nd Class

Gustav Krukenberg (8 March 1888 – 23 October 1980) was a high-ranking member of the Waffen-SS and commander of the SS Charlemagne Division and the remains of the SS Division Nordland during the Battle of Berlin in April 1945. After Krukenberg surrendered to Soviet Red Army troops, he was tried, convicted and sentenced to prison by a Soviet court. He was released from prison after serving 11 years and died on 23 October 1980 in Germany.

== Life ==
Krukenberg was born in Bonn, the son of a professor at Bonn University; his mother was the daughter of the archeologist Alexander Conze. He gained a doctorate in law and joined the army in 1907. He married in 1912. During World War I, he served as an ordnance officer and adjutant and was promoted to Hauptmann in 1918. After the war, in 1920 he served in the Civil Service as the private secretary to the Foreign minister and was briefly a director for a German company in industry from 1924 to 1925. In 1926 Krukenberg went to Paris as part of a German delegation and spent the next five years there. He joined the Nazi Party in April 1932 and he worked at the propaganda ministry after Adolf Hitler came to power and became a member of the Allgemeine SS in 1934.

== World War II ==
With the outbreak of World War II Krukenberg re-joined the army as a major and served on the General Staff in Paris. In December 1943 he transferred from the army, in which he had reached the rank of Oberstleutnant (Lt. colonel), to the Waffen-SS. He joined with the equivalent rank of Obersturmbannführer. Krukenberg obtained further promotions and by 1944 held the rank of Brigadeführer. A fluent French speaker, he was appointed the commander of the SS Division Charlemagne in February 1945. The division was formed out of the remnants of the Legion of French Volunteers Against Bolshevism (LVF) and French Sturmbrigade.

=== Berlin 1945 ===
On the night of 23/24 April 1945, Krukenberg received a call from Army Group Vistula headquarters. He was summoned to bring the remains of his division to help with the defence of Berlin. Krukenberg roused his men and informed them of the situation. He asked for volunteers to go to Berlin. Although the majority wanted to go, Krukenberg and Hauptsturmführer Henri Joseph Fenet only chose as many volunteers as they could provide transportation. The group made a long detour to avoid advance columns of the Red Army and entered Berlin at 22:00 hrs on 24 April 1945.

On 25 April, Krukenberg was appointed by General Helmuth Weidling as the commander of (Berlin) Defence Sector C, which included the SS Division Nordland, whose previous commander Joachim Ziegler was relieved of his command the same day. The arrival of the French SS men bolstered the Nordland Division whose "Norge" and "Danmark" regiments had been decimated in the fighting against the Soviet Red Army.

By 26 April, with Neukölln heavily penetrated by Soviet combat groups, Krukenberg prepared fallback positions for Sector C defenders around Hermannplatz. He moved his headquarters into the opera house. As the Nordland Division withdrew towards Hermannplatz, the Frenchmen under Fenet and some attached Hitler Youth destroyed fourteen Soviet tanks; one machine gun position by the Halensee bridge managed to hold up Soviet forces for 48 hours.

After an appeal by Krukenberg, General Weidling agreed to allow the re-deployment of the Nordland Division as one unit and not scattered in its employment. Weidling created two sub-sections of Sector "Z"; the Western Sub-sector would be commanded by Oberleutant Seifert. His command post was in the Air Ministry Building. The Eastern Sub-sector would be commanded by Krukenberg where most of the remains of the Nordland were already fighting. The demarcation line was the Wilhelmstrasse. Forced to fall back on 27 April, Krukenberg's Nordland headquarters was a carriage in the Stadtmitte U-Bahn station in Defence sector Z (Central District). Of the 108 Soviet tanks destroyed in the centre district, Frenchmen under Krukenberg's overall command accounted for "about half" of them. On 29 April 1945 Krukenberg awarded one of the last Knight's Crosses of the war to Unterscharführer Eugène Vaulot for his combat actions.

It is widely believed that on 1 May, Krukenberg attempted to stem the Soviet advance by ordering sappers to blow up the S-Bahn tunnel under the Landwehr canal, causing 25 kilometres of S-Bahn and U-Bahn tunnels to flood, which led to many casualties. But according to author A. Stephan Hamilton, it is far more probable that the massive bombardment of the city by hundreds of tons of shells and rockets by the Soviets caused the damage and flooding of the tunnels. As the Germans made extensive use of the underground (U-Bahn) for redeployment of troops, makeshift hospitals and as a place to take refuge from the constant shelling, it seems highly doubtful that Krukenberg ordered the destruction of the U-bahn tunnels.

After Hitler's death, Krukenberg assembled most of his escort made up of French SS for a breakout. They joined up with Joachim Ziegler and a larger group of Nordland troops. They crossed the Spree just before dawn. Near the Gesundbrunnen U-Bahn station they came under heavy fire from Red Army troops. Ziegler was gravely wounded and died on 2 May. Later, Krukenberg made it to Dahlem where he hid out in an apartment for a week before surrendering to Red Army troops. He was tried, convicted and sentenced to prison by a Soviet court. He was released from prison after serving 11 years and returned to Germany. Krukenberg died on 23 October 1980.

== Awards ==
- Iron Cross (1914), 1st and 2nd class
- Clasp to the Iron Cross (1939), 1st and 2nd class
- Honour Cross of the World War 1914/1918
