= Léon Gaultier =

French military personnel (1915–1997)

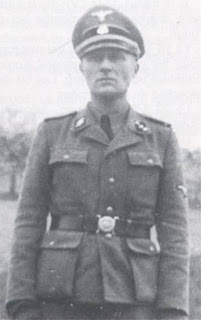
- Léon Gaultier in Waffen-SS uniform, during World War II.
- Born: 1 February 1915; Bourges, France
- Died: 18 July 1997 (aged 82)
- Military career
- Allegiance: France; Nazi Germany
- Branch: Waffen-SS
- Service years: 1943–45
- Rank: SS-Untersturmführer
- Unit: 33rd Waffen Grenadier Division of the SS Charlemagne
- Conflicts: World War II
- Other work: National Front

Léon Gaultier (French pronunciation: [leɔ̃ ɡoltje]; 1 February 1915 – 18 July 1997) was a French collaborator and a founding member of the National Front.

== Biography ==
Léon was born on 1 February 1915 in Bourges. He studied classics and became a professor of history.

During World War II, he worked along with Paul Marion, General Secretary for Information in the government of Philippe Pétain. Gaultier was a columnist for Radio-Vichy and one of the founders of the Milice.

Gaultier fought for Germany in the Waffen-SS with the rank of Untersturmführer. He commanded a French unit on the Eastern Front in the fall of 1944 and was seriously wounded in Galicia. He was sentenced to forced labor in 1946 and released on 2 June 1948, he eventually worked for the advertising agency Havas.

During the presidential campaign of far-right candidate Jean-Louis Tixier-Vignancour in 1965, Gaultier was responsible for propaganda and worked alongside former Cagoulard turned resistance fighter Serge Jeanneret.

He later co-founded with Jean-Marie Le Pen the publishing house SERP ("Société d'études et de relations publiques"), which specialized in editing historical recordings like political speeches and military songs.

In 1972, he was among the founders of the National Council of the National Front. Gaultier wrote in Rivarol and was gradually moved away from the circle of Jean-Marie Le Pen in early 1980s. Thereafter, he concentrated on writing his memoir.

== Works ==
- Gaultier, Léon (1980), J. Picollec (ed.), Catalina de Erauso (in French), Paris, ISBN 978-2-8647-7011-4, OCLC 7255341.
- Gaultier, León (1982), "Jean Coëtanlem : le cœur au poing, le lys aux lèvres", in J. Picollec (ed.), Biblio Celtique (in French), Paris, p. 267, ISBN 978-2-8647-7045-9, OCLC 9854275.
- Gaultier, Léon (1991), Perrin (ed.), Siegfried et le Berrichon : parcours d'un "collabo" (in French), Paris, p. 378, ISBN 978-2-2620-0888-8, OCLC 24429779
