= Tricolour Legion =

French military training initiative created and dissolved in 1942

The Tricolour Legion (French: Légion Tricolore), which existed almost entirely on paper between 22 June 1942 and 28 December 1942, was an initiative of the Vichy government under the auspices of Pierre Laval and his Secretary of State Jacques Benoist-Méchin to politically and militarily co-opt the Legion of French Volunteers Against Bolshevism (Légion des volontaires français contre le bolchevisme (LVF)), created on 8 July 1941. The latter in effect had the status of a private legal group under the exclusive control of French collaborationists, and its combat wing was integrated into the German Army as Infanterie Regiment 638.

== Goals of the Tricolore Legion ==
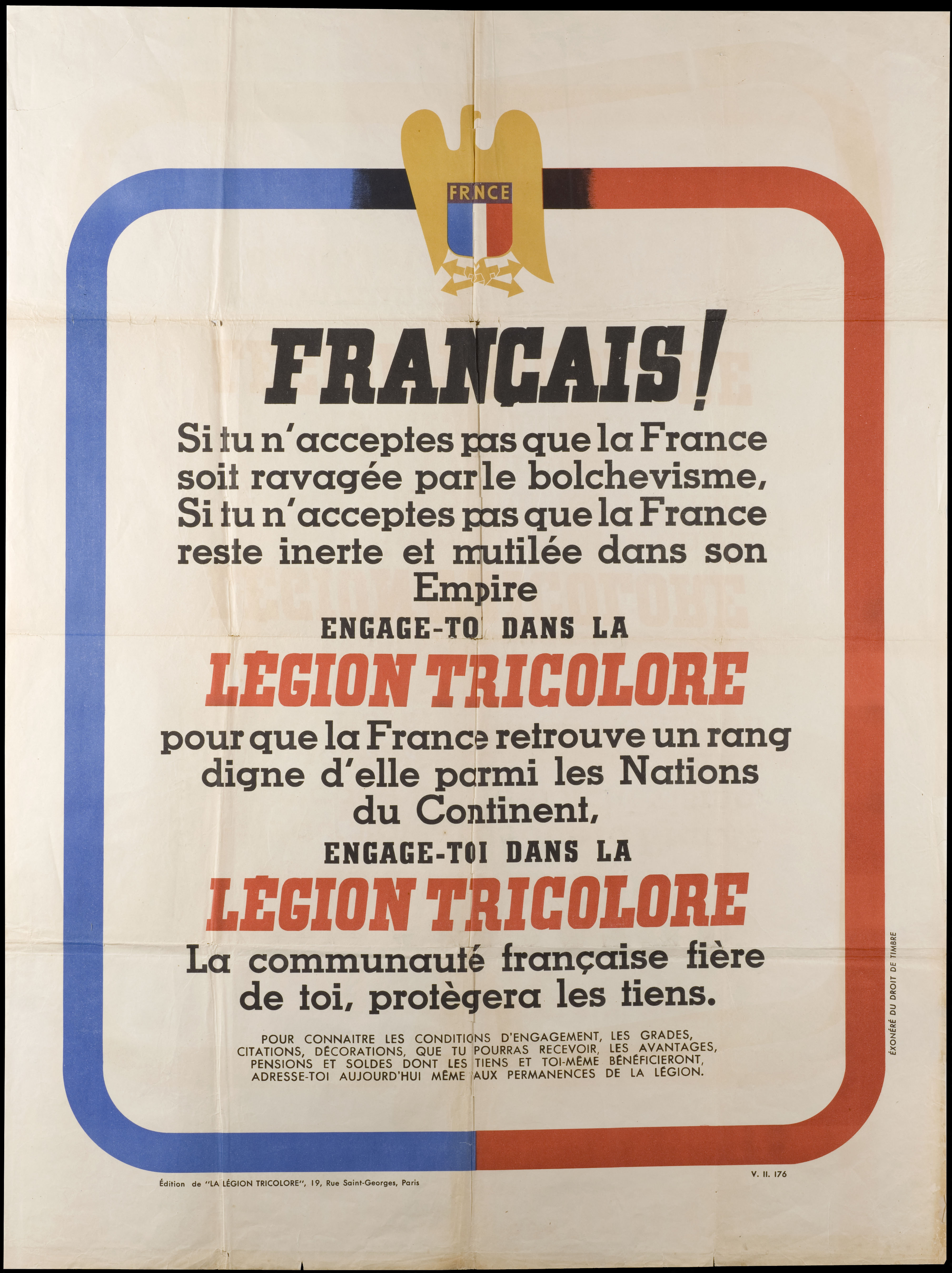

- Making of the LVF a French force that could fight for France, according to goals set by France. But the fighters of the LVF served on the Eastern Front as the German 638th infantry regiment, which made it impossible to recruit soldiers of the Armistice Army, who were forbidden to serve in a foreign uniform.
- Making of the LVF a political instrument of the government.

The LVF was torn by collaborationist political parties who fought one another to put themselves at the head of it. Its management was deplorable, embezzlement was frequent, and the tentacles of its bureaucracy were comfortably ensconced in Paris while its troops were massacred at the front.

The Tricolor Legion therefore should allow:

- Tearing the LVF away from its political infighting;
- Creating a French force with French goals (notably intervention in North Africa);
- Recruiting the soldiers of the Armistice Army;
- Intensifying collaboration with the Germans.

== Failure to establish the Tricolore Legion ==
The Legion failed largely because the French officials assumed that the Germans would approve. The Germans on the other hand had no desire to set up such a force, which could be turned against them if by chance the situation came to allow it, such as in the event of an alliance of the Vichy government with the Allies.

A delegate of the armistice commission investigated and the Germans required the French State to dissolve the Tricolore Legion that they were not recognizing, and Hitler banned the group on 17 September 1942. French law number 1113 of 28 December 1942 (Journal officiel du 17 janvier 1943) dissolved the unit.

== Consequences ==
- With the Legion dissolved, a good number of its members who did not belong to the Armistice Army rejoined the LVF.
- The LVF gained some candidates from the Légion tricolore.
- The collaborationist parties who had feared the Legion co-opting the LVF were strengthened.
- For the Vichy government, it was a burning failure.

== Aftermath ==
In North Africa, in Algiers after the Allied debarkment, the creation of a local Tricolore Legion was suggested, under the command of general Giraud. This project ran into strong local opposition. Volunteers were however recruited to form the French Corps d'Afrique, to fight alongside the Americans.
