= Delassus =

Delassus is a surname. Notable people with the surname include:

- Anatole Delassus (born 2001), French slalom canoeist
- Doriane Delassus (born 2002), French slalom canoeist
- Henri Delassus (1836–1921), French Roman Catholic priest and anti-Masonic writer
- Jean-François Delassus (born 1942), French journalist and director
- Marjorie Delassus (born 1998), French slalom canoeist

== See also ==
- De Lassus, Missouri, unincorporated area
- Orlando di Lasso (c. 1532–1594), sometimes cited as "de Lassus"
