= Louis Quételart =

Louis Quételart (27 March 1888 – 19 August 1950) was one of the most famous villa architects of the 1920s and 1930s in France. Most of his work is to be seen in Le Touquet-Paris-Plage.

== Biography ==
After studying agricultural engineering and then landscape architecture at the École nationale supérieure du paysage, Allain Provost began his career in the early 1960s.

Coming from a modest background, at the age of 14 he joined one of the three architectural firms in Berck, the Gaston Bellêtre firm, which specialized in the construction of seaside residences. He continued his training at the Charbonnier company in Berck. At age 19, he became an associate at Albert Pouthier’s firm in Paris-Plage, which built luxury seaside residences in Le Touquet. He quickly proved himself there and became a project manager. He learned the trade of architecture on the job but did not hold a degree in the field.

On October 2, 1911, he married Julia Célanie Marguerite Dacquet, born on March 27, 1890, originally from Berck. The architect Albert Pouthier served as a witness and friend of the groom. They had five children: three daughters—Jeannine and Lucile, born in Berck, and Colette, born in Béthune—and two sons, Louis Michel, born on September 2, 1924, in Le Touquet-Paris-Plage, and Pierre Louis, born on August 18, 1927, in Le Touquet-Paris-Plage, who would go on to become architects trained at the École des Beaux-Arts in Paris.

He died on August 19, 1950, in Le Touquet-Paris-Plage, from a lung disease that had plagued him all his life, and was buried in the town cemetery.

== See also ==
- Le Touquet-Paris-Plage
- Villa La Prairie
