= Bains, Haute-Loire =

Bains
- Commune
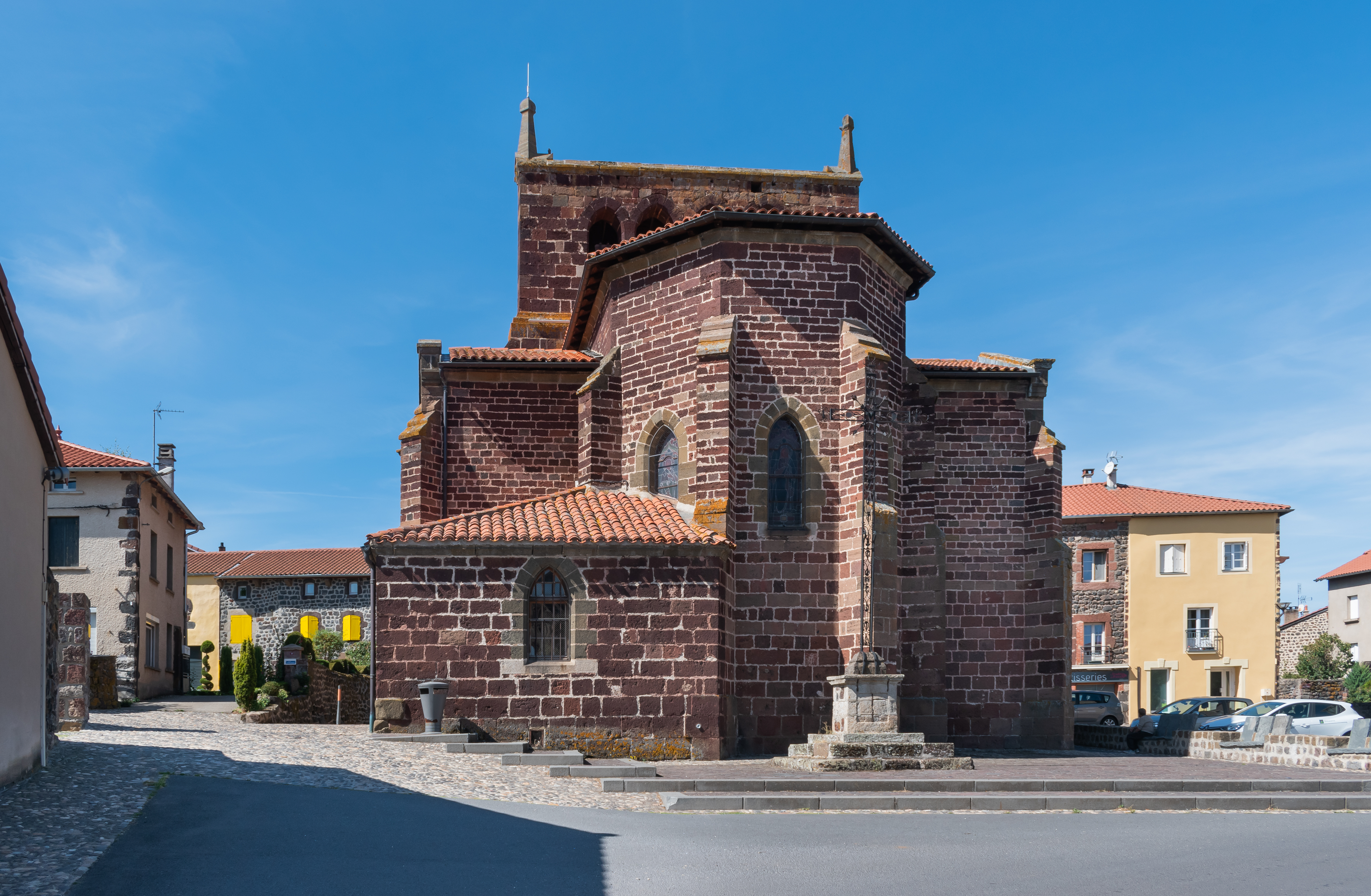
- The church in Bains

- Coat of arms
- Location of Bains
- Location within France Location within Auvergne-Rhône-Alpes
- Coordinates: 45°00′37″N 3°46′33″E
- Country: France
- Region: Auvergne-Rhône-Alpes
- Department: Haute-Loire
- Arrondissement: Le Puy-en-Velay
- Canton: Velay volcanique
- Intercommunality: CA du Puy-en-Velay

Government
  - Mayor (2021–2026): Marie-Françoise Favier
- Area^{1}: 37.56 km^{2} (14.50 sq mi)
- Highest elevation: 1,332 m (4,370 ft)
- Lowest elevation: 878 m (2,881 ft)
- Population (2023): 1,378
  - Density: 36.69/km^{2} (95.02/sq mi)
- Time zone: UTC+01:00 (CET)
  - Summer (DST): UTC+02:00 (CEST)
- INSEE/Postal code: 43018 /43370
- ^{1} French Land Register data, which excludes lakes, ponds, glaciers > 1 km^{2} (0.386 sq mi or 247 acres) and river estuaries.

Bains (French pronunciation: [bɛ̃s]) is a commune in the Haute-Loire department in south-central France.

== Population ==
Historical population
Year	Pop.	±% p.a.
1968	859	—
1975	852	−0.12%
1982	841	−0.19%
1990	917	+1.09%
1999	1,030	+1.30%
2007	1,163	+1.53%
2012	1,308	+2.38%
2017	1,353	+0.68%
2023	1,378	+0.31%
Source: INSEE

== See also ==
- Communes of the Haute-Loire department
