= Legion of French Volunteers Against Bolshevism =

German military unit during World War II

- Légion des volontaires français contre le bolchévisme
- Sleeve badge worn by members of the LVF, incorporating the French tricolor
- Active: 1941–1944
- Allegiance: Nazi Germany
- Branch: Wehrmacht
- Size: 2,300 troops (maximum); 5,800 troops (total, 1941–44)
- Engagements: Eastern Front (World War II); Battle of Moscow; Anti-Partisan operations in Byelorussia and Ukraine; Operation Bagration

Commanders
- Notable commanders: Edgar Puaud (1943–1944)

The Legion of French Volunteers Against Bolshevism (French: Légion des volontaires français contre le bolchévisme, LVF) was a unit of the German Army during World War II consisting of collaborationist volunteers from France. Officially designated the 638th Infantry Regiment (Infanterieregiment 638), it was one of several foreign volunteer units formed in German-occupied Western Europe to participate in the German invasion of the Soviet Union in 1941.

Created in July 1941, the LVF originated as an initiative by a coalition of far-right factions including Marcel Déat's National Popular Rally, Jacques Doriot's French Popular Party, Eugène Deloncle's Social Revolutionary Movement and Pierre Costantini's French League. In contrast to the conservative and authoritarian Vichy regime, which considered itself neutral, the LVF's founders explicitly supported Nazi ideology. The LVF was tolerated by Vichy and received limited personal endorsement from its leading figures.

Smaller than originally anticipated, the LVF was sent to the Eastern Front in October 1941. It performed poorly in combat during the Battle of Moscow in November and December 1941 and suffered heavy losses. Its constituent battalions were subsequently split up and only reconstituted into a single formation in September 1943. For most of its existence, it participated in so-called bandit-fighting operations (Bandenbekämpfung) behind the front line in German-occupied Byelorussia and Ukraine and participated in the violent repression of Soviet partisans and associated atrocities against the civilian population.

Over the course of its existence, 5,800 men served in the unit, although its strength never exceeded 2,300. After the Allied landings in Normandy and Liberation of France, the LVF was disbanded in September 1944 and its remaining personnel incorporated into the Waffen-SS in the short-lived SS "Charlemagne" Waffen-Grenadier Brigade.

== Background ==
France declared war on Nazi Germany in September 1939 at the same time as the United Kingdom. It was invaded and occupied by German forces after a disastrous military campaign in May and June 1940 in which 600,000 civilians and soldiers were killed, and a further 1.8 million soldiers were detained as prisoners of war in Germany. Critics of the country's pre-war republican regime attributed the national humiliation to the failure of parliamentary democracy and the corrupting influence of liberal individualism, communism, freemasonry and Jews. Countering these threats were among the main organising principles of the "National Revolution" declared by the authoritarian Vichy regime under Marshal Philippe Pétain in the aftermath of the defeat.

Map of France after the 1940 Armistice split between the northern "occupied" and southern "free zones"

Although a puppet state whose direct control over French territory was limited to the southern "free zone" (zone libre), the Vichy regime considered itself to be neutral and not part of an alliance with Germany. The Vichy regime could not control large parts of French territory under direct German occupation, notably the northern "occupied zone" (zone occupée). More extreme right-wing French political factions (groupuscules) centred on Paris in the zone occupée often shared a more explicitly Nazi and pro-German ideology than Vichy. These groups only enjoyed the support of a tiny fraction of the French population. The historian Julian Jackson estimates the peak number of adherents to these radical groups at a maximum of 220,000 in 1942. Although there had been interest within the German Foreign Ministry about closer ties with France after the defeat, these were vetoed by Adolf Hitler, who wanted total freedom to decide on the country's future after the war and was determined to keep the Vichy regime weak.

The four main political factions which emerged as leading proponents of radical collaborationism in France were Marcel Déat's National Popular Rally (Rassemblement national populaire, RNP), Jacques Doriot's French Popular Party (Parti populaire français, PPF), Eugène Deloncle's Social Revolutionary Movement (Mouvement social révolutionnaire, MSR), and Pierre Costantini's French League (Ligue française). These groups were small in size and widely considered as violent extremists by the majority of the French population and instead looked for support to the Germans. (Note: Before the war, Deloncle had led the far-right Cagoulards, which committed numerous terrorist attacks in France after 1937. The MSR, under his leadership, was responsible for a number of synagogue bombings and the assassination of the socialist politician Marx Dormoy between July and October 1941. According to German estimates, his MSR had only 1,385 members in 1941 although the organisation claimed as many as 20,000. Larger were the PPF which probably had 40,000 to 50,000 members and the RNP at 20,000 to 30,000.) Rivalries between the separate factions were intense. According to Jackson, "collaborationist politics was a vipers' nest of hatreds, all the more intense because power was so remote" as each vied with one another to be the single party in a future one-party state. German overtures towards these collaborationist factions put significant pressure on Vichy to renounce neutrality and gave rise to deep suspicion in Pétain's entourage. The German invasion of the Soviet Union on 22 June 1941 provided the factions with an opportunity to consolidate German support by demonstrating their loyalty and political importance to the German occupiers. Although the invasion did not lead Vichy to declare war, it broke off diplomatic relations with the Soviet Union on 30 June 1941.

== Formation ==
=== Origins of the LVF ===
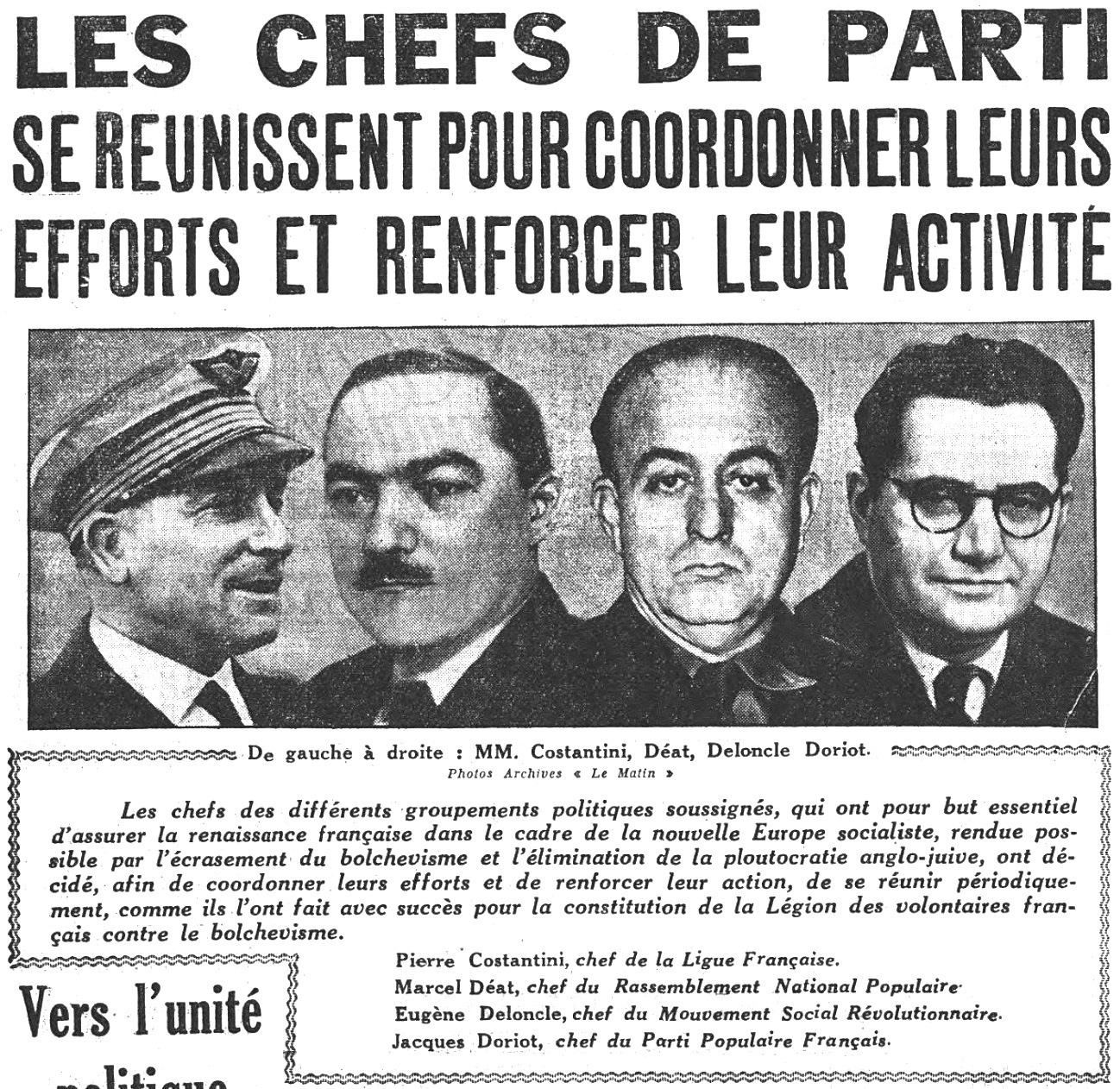
The newspaper Le Matin announces the collaboration between the political factions led by Constantini, Déat, Deloncle and Doriot (left to right) "to assure a French renewal within the new socialist Europe, made possible by the crushing of bolshevism and the elimination of the Anglo-Jewish plutocracy".

The exact origins of the unit are unclear. It is generally believed that Doriot was first to suggest a French unit for the Eastern Front days after the invasion of the Soviet Union began in June 1941. Rather than involving Vichy, he reached out to the German ambassador in Paris, Otto Abetz. Hitler approved the unit's creation on 5 July 1941 but mandated that it be organised privately and limited to 10,000 men, much smaller than the 30,000 that Doriot and his supporters had imagined. The historian Owen Anthony Davey writes that "the prospect of 30,000 armed French fanatics must have been frightening even to the Germans". At around the same time, numerous similar volunteer units were formed in other parts of German-occupied Belgium, the Netherlands, Denmark, and Norway as well as neutral Francoist Spain. (Note: The number of soldiers from these states on the Eastern Front in 1941 was initially about 30,000 in total. The historian Rolf-Dieter Müller considers that the value of this "small but heterogenous group" was chiefly symbolic and political rather than military. They were "representatives of right-wing extremist and fascist movements in their home countries, each cast in a peculiar mould" acting from "a unique mixture of adventurousness, idealism, and political ambition". Their numbers were dwarfed by those of German's allied and puppet states such as Finland, Hungary, Romania, Italy, Slovakia, and Croatia which in the same period contributed 600,000 men to the German invasion of the Soviet Union.)

Doriot, Déat, Deloncle and Constantine met at the Hotel Majestic in Paris on 7 July 1941 and agreed to co-ordinate their efforts towards the Anti-Bolshevik Legion (Légion anti-Bolchévique), soon renamed the Legion of French Volunteers Against Bolshevism (Légion des volontaires français contre le Bolchévisme, LVF). At Abetz's initiative, they agreed to establish a "central committee" to manage recruitment and publicity for the unit under Deloncle's presidency. A joint appeal was published in the PPF newspaper Cri du Peuple on 8 July 1941 setting out the intended aims of the LVF and appealing for support. Among those who rallied to the new foundation were even smaller factions from the French extreme-right, such as Jean Boissel's Frankish Front (Front franc), Marcel Bucard's Frankish Movement (Mouvement franciste) and Maurice-Bernard de la Gatinais's French Crusade for National Socialism (Croisade française du national-socialisme).

Conscious of the marginality of its leading figures, an "honorary committee" was established a few months later to support its activities and bring in figures from France's intelligentsia and the Catholic Church to increase its respectability. Honorary committee members included Cardinal Alfred Baudrillart, the inventor Auguste Lumière, the journalist Jean Luchaire, the writer Alphonse de Châteaubriant, and the académiciens Abel Bonnard, Abel Hermant, and Maurice Donnay. In LVF propaganda, Catholic and Napoleonic symbolism remained ubiquitous.

=== Recruitment ===
The first large public rally for the LVF took place with German backing in the Vélodrome d'Hiver in Paris on 18 July 1941 and marked the effective start of the recruitment campaign. It was soon actively recruiting and fundraising across France. Its propaganda portrayed the legion as part of a Europe-wide crusade against communism, drawing on France's medieval history and avoiding mention of Germany. It established 137 recruitment offices across France, some of them in expropriated Jewish homes. The Legion appealed particularly to men on the margins of French society. Among volunteers recruited in Marseille, half were unemployed and 40 percent had criminal records.

Recruitment remained below target and the LVF struggled to enlist more than 3,000 men in its initial phase. This was partly because the LVF was officially a private organisation run by the committee in Paris which was active only within the occupied zone although an informal "action committee" was also soon established in the free zone under the former PPF deputy Simon Sabiani and was able to operate semi-officially. The Vichy regime provided no direct support for its recruitment campaign although it partially repealed an existing law prohibiting French citizens from enlisting in foreign armed forces. (Note: Pétain wrote privately to Colonel Labonne in November 1941 to praise the LVF's "contribution to the crusade against Bolshevism". His regime provided various forms of symbolic endorsement to the LVF in 1942 including providing the unit with a standard-pattern regimental flag and granting official recognition for the privately introduced "Legionary Croix de Guerre" (Croix de Guerre légionnaire). The LVF was permitted to recruit openly in the zone libre from 1942. According to the historian David Littlejohn, it was "clear that the Vichy government not only failed to oppose active military collaboration with Germany, but even went out of its way to facilitate it.") Some Vichy officials may have attempted to hinder recruitment in the free zone, and there were few volunteers from Vichy's own Armistice Army. At the same time, the German authorities blocked attempts to recruit French prisoners of war in Germany and imposed more restrictive conditions on service in light of France's political importance within German-occupied Europe. As Davey noted:

Such organizations were to serve the diplomatic interests of the Reich, not the interests of a nationalist revival in France. If the Legion had ever become truly popular, German support would in all probability have waned or been withdrawn. The limitation on the size of the Legion was an early indication of the restrictive German attitude towards the growth of collaborationist power. No collaborationist leader would ever receive German support for a nationalist movement in France. The LVF, like all their other enterprises, was destined for failure at the moment of birth.

Despite racialised admission criteria, the unit included non-white volunteers from the French colonial empire. According to one source, there were approximately 200 non-white personnel, most of whom came from French North Africa and served in the 3rd Battalion. (Note: Muslim North Africans were particularly overrepresented among the earliest volunteers for the LVF. Around 130 had volunteered by October 1941 by which time only 3,000 applications had been received in total. Among the colonial volunteers was the Algerian anti-colonial nationalist Saïd Mohammedi (1912–1994) who later fought for the National Liberation Front (Front de libération nationale, FLN) during the Algerian War and was active in post-independence politics in Algeria.) There were also a number of White Russian émigrés. The LVF drew recruits from across the social strata of French society, many of whom had nothing in common beyond anticommunism.

=== Establishment and training ===
The first contingent of recruits was assembled at Versailles for a public parade on 27 August 1941 to mark the LVF's creation. At the ceremonies, Pétain's deputy Pierre Laval and Déat were shot and wounded in an attempted assassination by a follower of Deloncle who had enlisted in the unit. The following day, German Army doctors rejected almost half of the recruits on medical grounds. Although 10,000 recruits volunteered in its first two years of the LVF's existence, almost half were rejected on these grounds and the unit remained far below the ceiling imposed in 1941. Doriot personally enlisted in the first contingent, boosting the prestige of his PPF among collaborationist sympathisers in France.

Amid continuing Vichy opposition, the LVF was folded into the German Army (Wehrmacht). The recruits had been promised that they would fight in French uniforms, but instead were given German uniforms, with only a small shield-shaped badge worn on the right arm in the colors of the French flag to signify their national origin. It proved difficult to find an experienced military officer willing to act as commanding officer. Déat announced on 8 July that General Joseph Hassler, who had commanded a French division in 1940, would command the LVF. Hassler, who had not been consulted beforehand, refused any involvement. The committee ultimately chose the 65-year old Colonel Roger Henri Labonne, who had no combat experience but had previously served as French military attaché in Turkey.

The first detachment left France on 8 September 1941 and the LVF began basic training in October 1941 at Deba in the General Government, run by French-speaking German officers. It was designated the 638th Infantry Regiment (Infanterieregiment 638) and was integrated into the 7th Infantry Division, drawn mainly from Bavaria. Before leaving training, 60 men were repatriated for various reasons including refusing to wear German uniforms and disciplinary issues. (Note: Disciplinary issues remained a persistent problem for the LVF. Soldiers off-duty in Paris routinely attacked civilians including French policemen and members of the zazou subculture.) A small number refused to swear an oath of allegiance to Hitler and were imprisoned.

== Operational history ==
=== Siege of Moscow, November–December 1941 ===
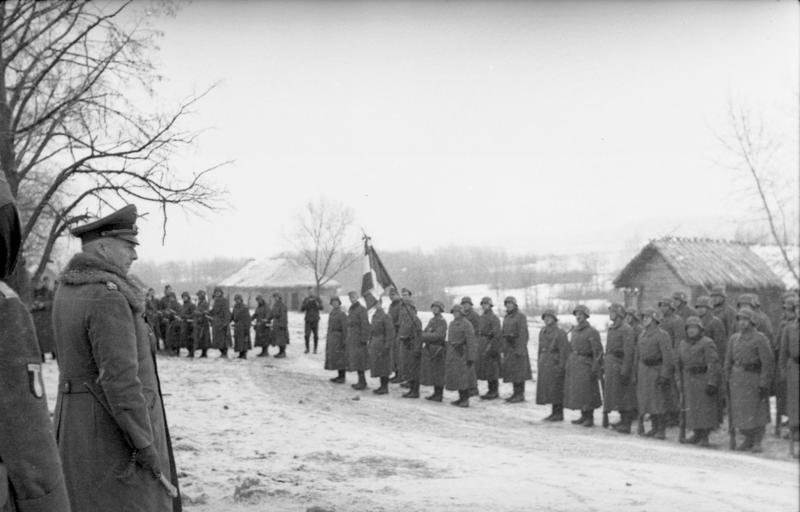
Field Marshal Hans Günther von Kluge visits the regiment in November 1941 at the time of its arrival on the Eastern Front

By October 1941, the LVF comprised two battalions with a strength of 2,271 men, 181 French officers, and 35 German officers. They were equipped with light weapons, machine guns, and a small number of 3.7 cm Pak 35/36 anti-tank guns. From the start, there was significant rivalries and little internal cohesion within the LVF; 400 men were lost to desertion and disease in its first months before even seeing action. There were frequent confrontations between supporters of Doriot and Deloncle, especially among the unit's highly politicised French officers. The historian Oleg Beyda writes:

The military training the soldiers had received was poor; little attention was paid to them, and the weapons they were given were of low quality. For the most part, the personnel were unsuited to military service. Food supplies were inadequate and of unsatisfactory quality. Because of an almost complete lack of facilities, hygiene was poor, and lice began to appear while the troops were still in the camp. Letters from home came irregularly, and the legionnaires learned soon after their arrival that their families were not receiving the whole sums stipulated in the contracts, which gave rise to general discontent.

The LVF was deployed to Smolensk and sent as reinforcements to the fighting near Moscow in November and December 1941 where it became the only foreign unit to fight alongside the Germans. Beyda writes that by the time of its arrival at the front, the unit "was on its last legs". Many collaborators had feared that the unit might arrive too late at the front to see action, and its training had been cut short for this reason. The LVF was first deployed in combat near the village of Vygliadovka and participated in a successful frontal assault against Soviet positions on 1 December, but was hit by a large Soviet counterattack several days later, suffering extremely high casualties. Within months, the LVF had lost around half its manpower in action or through frostbite; there was also a serious outbreak of dysentery. Some individual soldiers deserted to the Red Army or committed suicide. After two weeks, they were withdrawn from the front line in Djukovo (40 kilometres (25 mi) from Moscow) and returned to Smolensk. Afterwards, the LVF was used only behind the front-line.

=== Separation and "bandit-fighting" operations, 1941–43 ===
"On the evening of 8 January 1943, in the course of an operation, the behavior of some 20 men aged around 18 to 40 years who had stayed in place and maintained an obstinate silence was sufficiently clear that [...] I gave the order to shoot all the men and the order was executed. I knew the situation was the same in the neighbouring village of Tcherneschevskaya on the return route. I gave the order for it to be burned."

— Report from an LVF member about a "bandit-fighting" operation in German-occupied Russia.

In the aftermath of its initial deployment, the LVF was withdrawn from front-line service and assigned to so-called "bandit-fighting" operations (Bandenbekämpfung) against supposed Soviet partisans in the rear-echelons of Army Group Centre. Almost immediately, however, it was withdrawn entirely from service soon afterwards and transferred to Radom in the General Government to reform. Another contingent of volunteers arrived from France in December 1941 and formed the basis of the 3rd Battalion. As the LVF's 2nd Battalion had been almost entirely annihilated, the LVF still numbered two battalions numbered the 1st and 3rd. In Radom, the Germans purged the unit of more prominent political activists as well as the White Russian, Arab and African personnel whose enlistment it had already forbidden. Labonne was recalled to Paris in March 1942 and removed from his command but was awarded the Iron Cross Second Class as a face-saving measure.

After its reorganisation, the Legion's two remaining battalions were deployed separately to "bandit-fighting" operations in the region around Smolensk under the auspices of Army Group Centre. The 3rd Battalion was assigned to the 44th Security Regiment of the 221st Security Division in May 1942. In July 1942, the 1st Battalion was attached to the 2nd Security Regiment in the 286th Security Division. Although no longer operating as a single unit, the LVF's total strength grew to 3,641 men. In the course of their service in this capacity, French soldiers became known for their indiscipline and looting from civilian population. They acted with similar violence to their German counterparts who routinely killed Soviet civilians, especially Jews, who fell into their hands. According to the historian Rolf-Dieter Müller, "brute force was used against the population, including the plundering and destruction of villages". The historian Aleksandr Vershinin states that the personnel of the LVF thought the Soviet citizens they encountered were backward, culturally inferior and even subhuman, and sometimes drew parallels with French colonial troops involved in punitive expeditions in North Africa. According to Beyda, the LVF proved to be largely ineffective in anti-partisan warfare as a result of a combination of low morale, disagreements with the German command, and military inexperience.

=== Tricolor Legion and reorganisation, 1942–44 ===
As Laval's political influence increased, the Vichy regime announced a new formation, the Tricolor Legion (Légion tricolore), in July 1942. Conceived by the Vichy minister Jacques Benoist-Méchin, the Tricolor Legion was intended to serve as a French unit alongside Axis forces on the Eastern Front and "in all theatres where French interests are at stake". Unlike the LVF, the Tricolor Legion would enjoy official and genuinely autonomous status and be considered part of the French army. Benoist-Méchin hoped that the LVF could be absorbed into the Tricolor Legion, and he was appointed to the LVF's Central Committee alongside other Vichy functionaries. Laval endorsed the project as a way to wrest political influence away from the groupuscules in Paris. Abetz approved the new proposal, but the Tricolor Legion was rejected by Hitler and the German Army. The Vichy-controlled free zone was invaded and occupied by German forces in November 1942 and the Tricolor Legion was quietly abandoned in December 1942. (Note: The attempt to establish the Tricolor Legion did, however, result in the formation 200-strong African Phalanx (Phalange africaine), intended to be brigade-strength, which was deployed in fighting against the Western Allies in French North Africa in the aftermath of Operation Torch.) Volunteers were offered a choice between returning to civilian life and service with the LVF; most chose the former option.

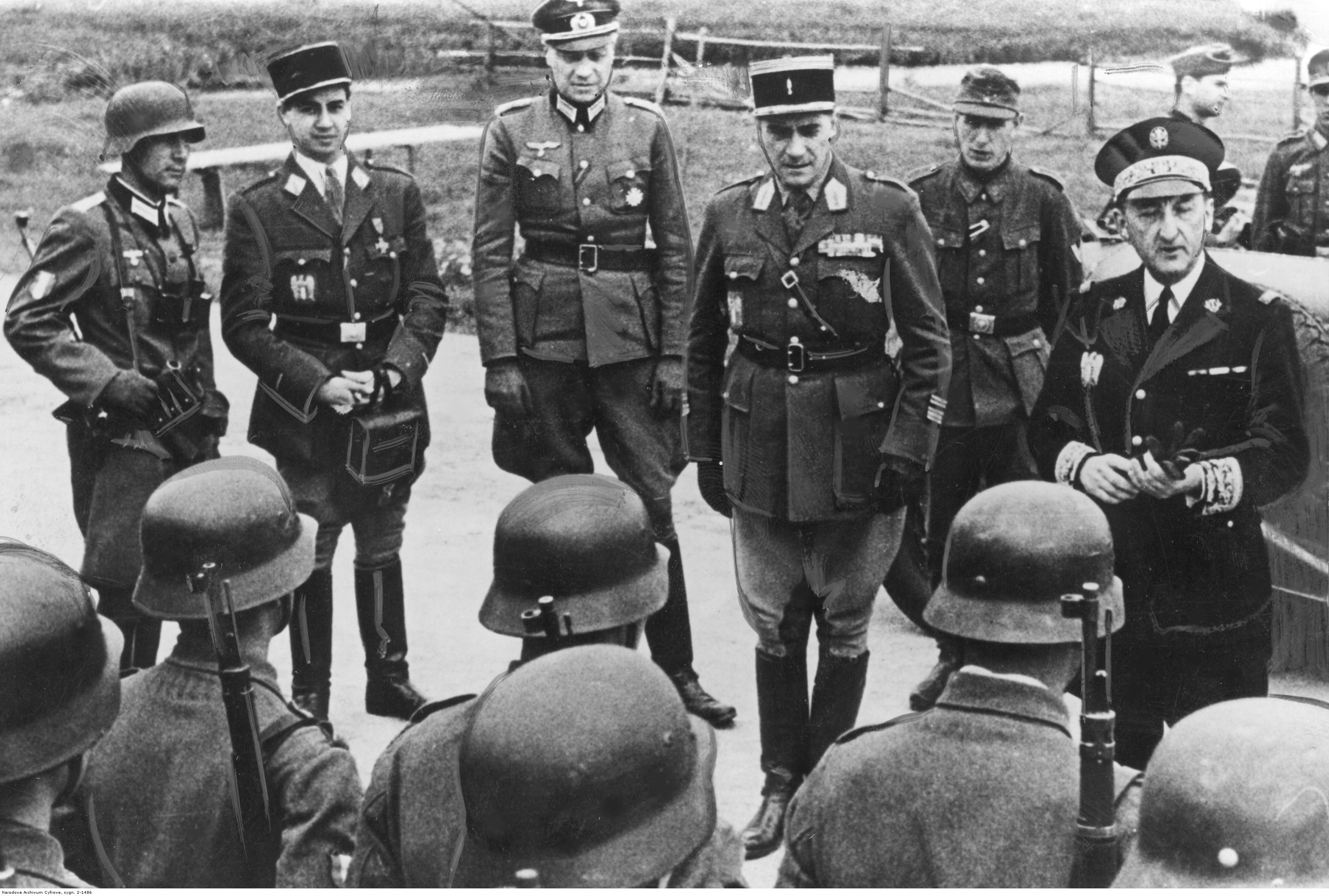
Fernand de Brinon, Vichy minister, inspects the LVF in September 1943. Puaud is third from the right, wearing a French uniform and kepi.

The 1st and 3rd Battalions were formally regrouped into a single regiment on 1 September 1943 and were joined by the 2nd Battalion which was re-created in November 1943. The LVF was placed under the command of Colonel Edgar Puaud who had enlisted in the Tricolor Legion. By the time of its reestablishment, the number of soldiers in the LVF had fallen to only 1,000, making it badly understrength. It was hoped Turkmen hiwis could fill a shortfall in recruits, but these plans were abandoned after the creation of the Turkestan Legion. All three battalions of the LVF were deployed as a single unit for the first time in a large-scale attack in January 1944 dubbed Operation Morocco against partisans in a large forested area near Somry in Byelorussia. In the course of the operation, 1,118 supposed partisans were killed and 1,345 detained. Puaud received the Légion d'Honneur as a result. In the aftermath of the operation, the LVF nonetheless came under increasing pressure as the strength of partisan groups grew. 22 men were killed by partisans in March 1944 alone. The historian Kuzma Kozak estimates that, during its service in Byelorussia, the LVF lost 496 men killed, 107 wounded and 16 taken prisoner.

=== Operation Bagration, June 1944 ===
As a result of its own dwindling numbers and a resurgence in partisan activity, the German military authorities had decided to withdraw the LVF to Germany on 18 June 1944 a few days before the start of the major Soviet offensive into Byelorussia. Some 400 soldiers from the LVF were hurriedly drafted into front-line service to attempt to stall the Soviet advance. They were attached a Kampfgruppe hastily assembled around the 4th SS Police Regiment and fought a successful small-scale delaying action at Bobr on the Moscow-Minsk road on 26–27 June 1944 with the support of a German unit of Tiger tanks. Although 41 French soldiers were killed in the action, the losses on the Soviet side were heavy and 40 Soviet tanks were destroyed. The Kampfgruppe retreated to Minsk later that month, and the LVF was redeployed to Greifenberg in Pomerania, where it was disbanded on 1 September 1944.

== Unit commanders ==
- Colonel Roger Henri Labonne (September 1941 to March 1942)
- None (March 1942 to September 1943)
- Colonel Edgar Puaud (September 1943 to September 1944)

== Disbandment ==
Preparations for the disbandment of the LVF began in July 1944 in the aftermath of the Allied landings in Normandy the previous month. The German authorities intended that most of its members would be incorporated into the Waffen-SS, which had begun to accept French recruits in July 1943 as part of the SS Volunteer Sturmbrigade France (Französische SS Freiwilligen Sturmbrigade). The LVF was officially disbanded on 1 September 1944, by which time most of France had already been liberated by the Western Allies. The unit's remaining personnel, numbering approximately 1,200, were transferred to the new Charlemagne Waffen Grenadier Brigade of the SS (Waffen-Grenadier-Brigade der SS "Charlemagne"). No notice had been given of the transfer to the Waffen-SS and unconfirmed sources suggest that 70 soldiers who refused to swear the new oath of allegiance were sent to concentration camps.

Charlemagne was officially reclassified as a division in February 1945 but was significantly under-strength at 7,340 men. It was almost totally destroyed in its first deployment against Soviet forces in Pomerania in February and March 1945. Puaud, who had become nominal commander of the new formation after the LVF's dissolution, was posted missing in action and was probably killed in fighting at Neustrelitz on 25 February 1945. Around 100 men remaining in the Charlemagne Division participated in the Battle in Berlin in April–May 1945.

== See also ==
- Normandie-Niemen Fighter Regiment – Free French air unit which fought for the Soviet Union
