= 11th SS Volunteer Panzergrenadier Division Nordland =

German armored division

- 11. SS-Freiwilligen Panzergrenadier-Division "Nordland"
- Divisional insignia
- Active: July 1943 – May 1945
- Country: Nazi Germany
- Branch: (Schutzstaffel) Waffen-SS
- Type: Panzergrenadier
- Size: Division
- Engagements: World War II; Battle of Narva; Battle of Tannenberg Line; Tartu offensive; Battle of Berlin

Commanders
- Notable commanders: Franz Augsberger

The 11th SS Volunteer Panzergrenadier Division Nordland (German: 11. SS-Freiwilligen Panzergrenadier-Division "Nordland") was a Waffen-SS division primarily raised with Germans and ethnic Germans from Romania, but also foreign volunteers from Western Europe. It saw action, as part of Army Group North, in the Independent State of Croatia and on the Eastern Front during World War II.

== Formation ==
In February 1943, Hitler ordered the creation of an SS division which would be officered by foreign volunteers. In March 1943, the SS-Panzergrenadier-Regiment Nordland was separated from the SS Division Wiking to be used as the nucleus for the new division. The division's two Panzergrenadier regiments were also given titles that were meant to reference the countries of origin of their respective recruits, SS-Panzergrenadier-Regiment 23 Norge (Norway) and SS-Panzergrenadier-Regiment 24 Danmark (Denmark), however, at the time of the division's arrival on the Eastern Front in the autumn of 1943, almost 80% of its men were either Reichsdeutsche from Germany or Volksdeutsche.

After its formation in Germany, the division was attached to the III (Germanic) SS Panzer Corps under the command of SS-Obergruppenführer Felix Steiner and was moved to Croatia. The division began combat operations against Yugoslav partisans in September 1943. In mid-October 1943, the division burned and looted several Serb villages in the Banija region of Croatia, and helped organize a local collaborationist Chetnik militia.

== 1944–1945 ==
The division, along with the rest of the III SS Panzer Corps arrived at the front near Leningrad and was put into action against the Soviet Red Army attacks aimed at breaking the German encirclement of the city. The Red Army forced Nordland to withdraw to Oranienbaum. On 14 January 1944, the Soviet Krasnoye Selo–Ropsha Offensive succeeded in collapsing the German front. The follow-on Kingisepp–Gdov Offensive pushed the German forces to the city of Narva in northeastern Estonia to a new defensive line.

From 27 July 1944, Nordland fought alongside the 20th Waffen Grenadier Division of the SS (1st Estonian) and elements of the Grossdeutschland Division In the Battle of Tannenberg Line. During these battles, the commanders of two regiments were killed. While visiting the front line, the division's commander, SS-Gruppenführer Fritz von Scholz was caught in an artillery barrage and received a head wound. Scholz died on 28 July 1944. Thereafter, SS-Brigadeführer Joachim Ziegler took over command of the division. After Riga fell, the division retreated into what was known as the Courland Pocket. From late October to December 1944, the Nordland remained in the pocket; by early December the divisional strength was down to 9,000 men. In January 1945, the division was ordered to the Baltic port of Libau, where it was evacuated by sea.

== Battle of Berlin ==
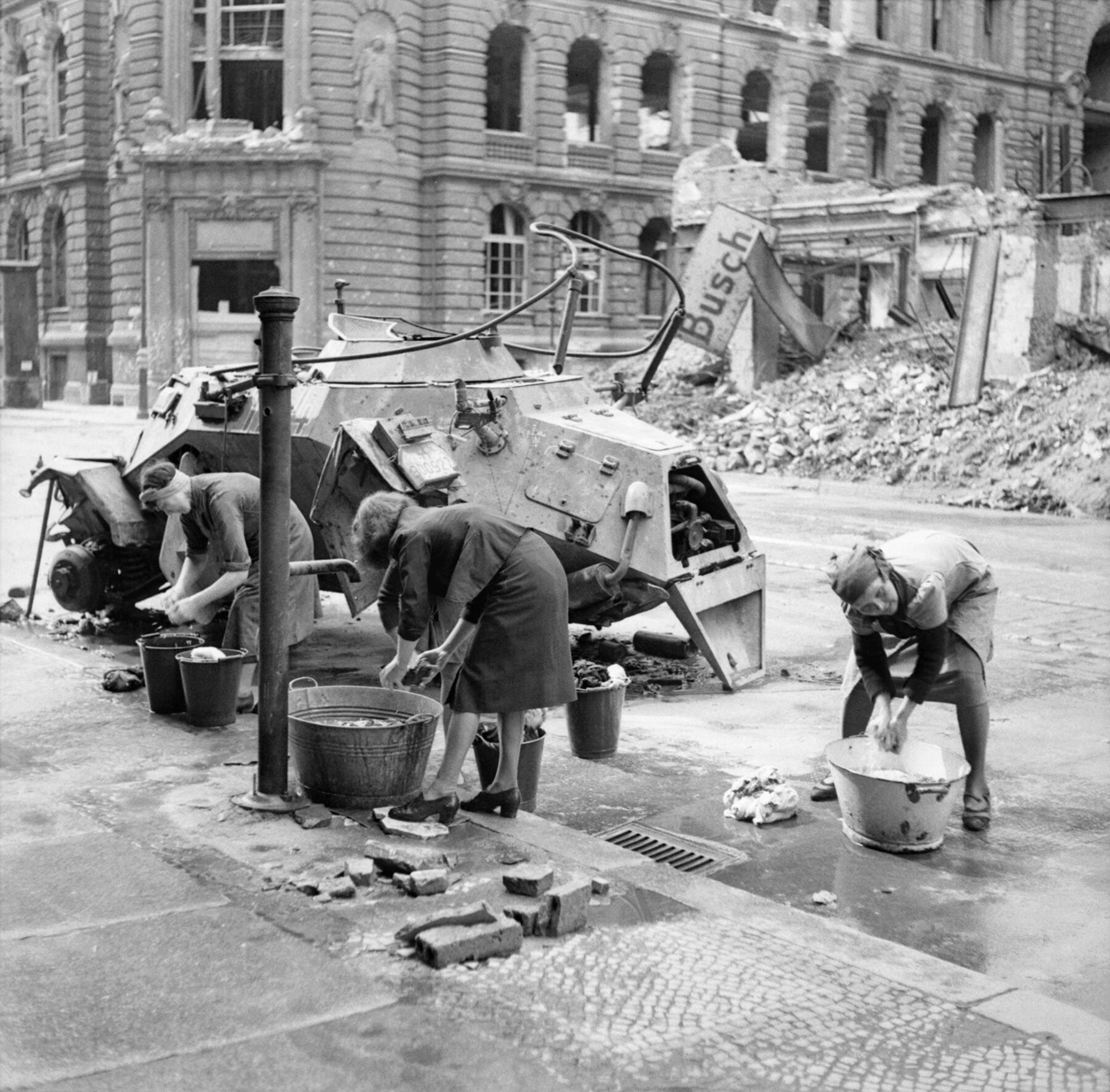
Panzerspähwagen Sd. Kfz. 223, tactical number 124, of the 1./SS PzAA 11. Near where the Nordland began their breakout in Französische Strasse, Berlin 3 July 1945

On 16 April, the division was ordered to defend Berlin. Despite recent replenishment, the division was still understrength. From 17 to 20 April, the division was involved in combat all along its front and then retreated into the city. On 24 April, the main Soviet Army assault was towards the Treptow Park area, defended by the rest of the pioneer battalion and the remaining Tiger tanks of a Panzer battalion. SS-Obersturmbannführer Kausch led the few tanks and armoured vehicles in a counterattack and succeeded in temporarily halting the enemy advance. However, by midday, the 5th Shock Army was able to advance again. A later counter-attack by three assault guns was stopped by a Soviet soldier with three captured German Panzerfausts.

On 25 April, SS-Brigadeführer Gustav Krukenberg was appointed the commander of (Berlin) Defence Sector C, which included Nordland. Ziegler was relieved of his command of the division earlier the same day.

By 26 April, with Neukölln heavily penetrated by Soviet combat groups, Krukenberg prepared fallback positions for Sector C troops around Hermannplatz. He moved his headquarters into the opera house. As Nordland fell back towards Hermannplatz, its troops and one-hundred Hitler Youth attached to their group destroyed 14 Soviet tanks with Panzerfausts; one machine gun position by the Halensee bridge managed to block Soviet advance in that area for 48 hours. Its remaining armour, eight Tiger tanks and several assault guns, were ordered to take up positions in the Tiergarten; although the two divisions of Weidling's LVI Panzer Corps could slow the Soviet advance down, they could not stop it.

The Soviet forces advance into Berlin followed a pattern of massive shelling followed by assaults using house-clearing battle groups of about 80 men in each, with tank escorts and close artillery support. On 27 April, the remnants of Nordland were pushed back into the central government district (Zitadelle sector) in Defence sector Z. Krukenberg's headquarters was a carriage in the Stadtmitte U-Bahn station. Of the 108 Soviet tanks destroyed in the centre district, Frenchmen under Krukenberg's overall command accounted for "about half" of them. Still, the troops in the government district were pushed back by Soviet forces into the Reichstag and the Reich Chancellery.

On 30 April, after receiving news of Hitler's suicide, orders were issued that those who could do so were to break out. Prior to that SS-Brigadeführer Wilhelm Mohnke briefed all commanders that could be reached within the Zitadelle sector about the events as to Hitler's death and the planned breakout. The break out from the Reich Chancellery and Führerbunker started at 2300 hours on 1 May. There were ten main groups that attempted to head northwest.

Fierce fighting continued all around, especially in the Weidendammer Bridge area. In that area, what was left of the division was destroyed by Soviet artillery and anti-tank guns. The division's last Tiger was knocked out attempting to cross the Weidendammer Bridge. Several small groups reached the Americans at the Elbe's west bank, but most (including Mohnke's group and men from Krukenberg's group), were not successful. Most were killed in the fighting or taken prisoner after they surrendered to Soviet troops. Ziegler was gravely wounded after the break out group he was in came under heavy Soviet fire. He died on 2 May. Krukenberg made it to Dahlem, where he hid out in an apartment for a week, before surrendering to Soviet troops. On 2 May hostilities officially ended by order of General Helmuth Weidling, commander of the Defence Area Berlin.

== Organization ==
Structure of the Division

- SS-Panzergrenadier-Regiment 23
- SS-Panzergrenadier-Regiment 24
- Kradschützen-Regiment SS-Panzergrenadier-Division 11
- SS-Panzer-Regiment 11
- SS-Panzerjäger-Abteilung 11
- SS-Artillerie-Regiment 11
- SS-Sturmgeschütz-Abteilung 11
- SS-Flak-Abteilung 11
- SS-Pionier-Bataillon 11
- SS-Nachrichten-Abteilung 11
- SS-Feldersatz-Bataillon 11
- Kommandeur der SS-Divisions-Nachschubtruppen 11
- SS-Instandsetzungs-Abteilung 11
- SS-Sanitäts-Abteilung 11
- SS-Wirtschafts-Bataillon 11

== Commanders ==
- SS-Brigadeführer Franz Augsberger (22 March – 1 May 1943)
- SS-Gruppenführer Fritz von Scholz (1 May 1943 – 27 July 1944)
- SS-Brigadeführer Joachim Ziegler (27 July 1944 – 25 April 1945)
- SS-Brigadeführer Gustav Krukenberg (25 April – 8 May 1945)

== Gallery ==
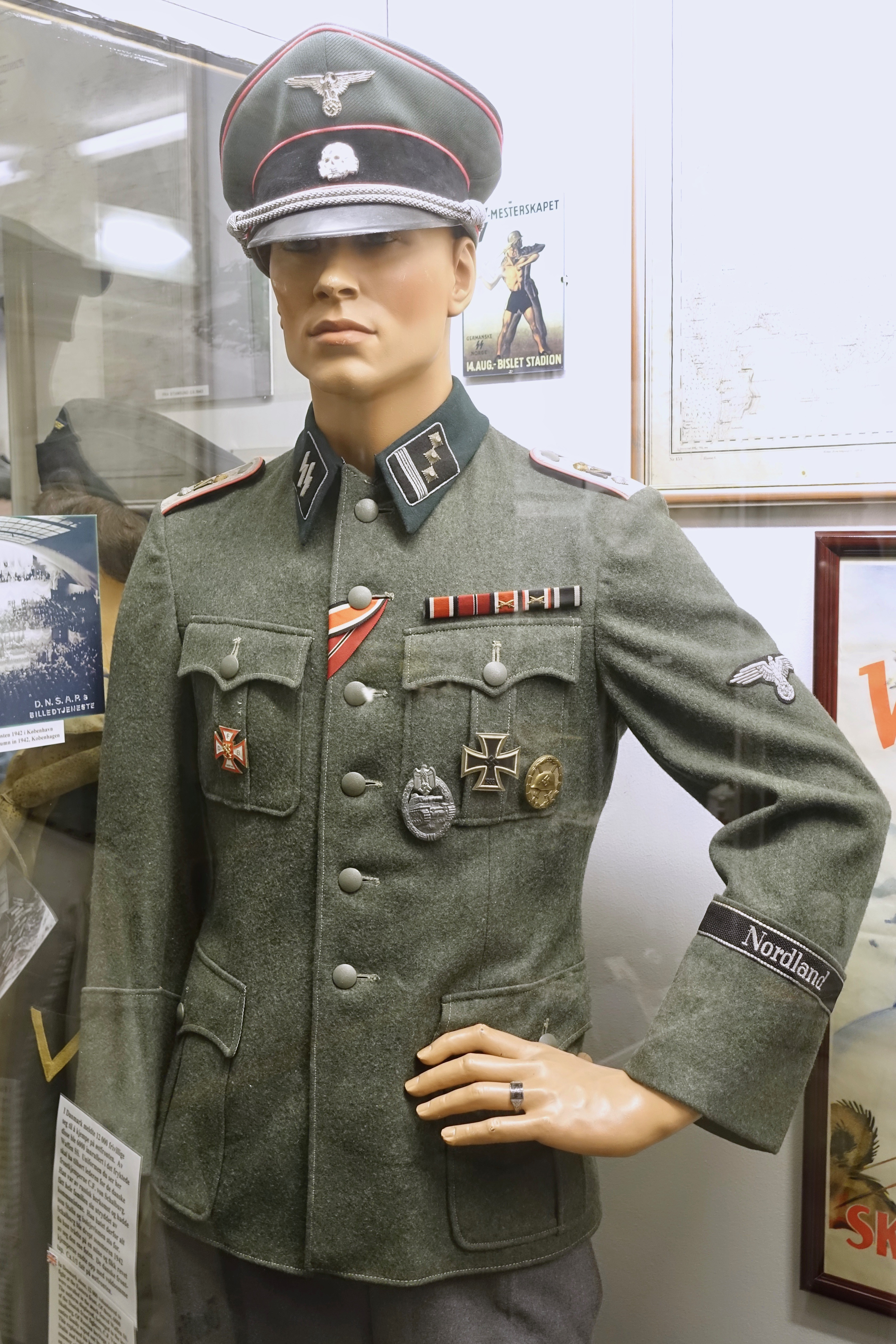
Officer uniform with medals and cuffband Nordland of the Regiment Nordland, Lofoten War Museum, Norway.

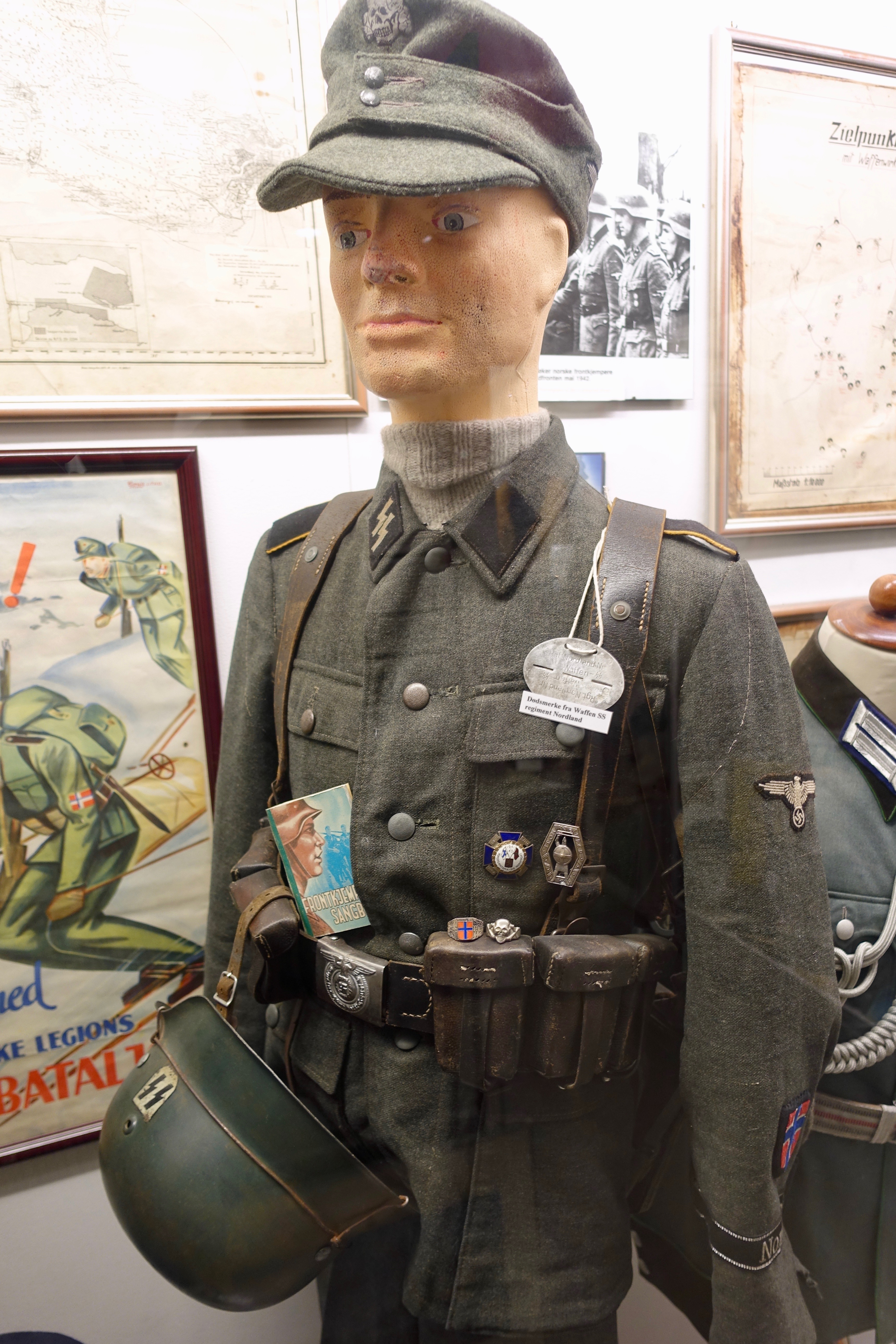
Enlisted "frontkjemper" ("Frontfighter" a Norwegian Waffen-SS volunteer) SS-Mann (private) of the Regiment Nordland, with medals, badges and other memorabilia; Lofoten War Museum, Norway.

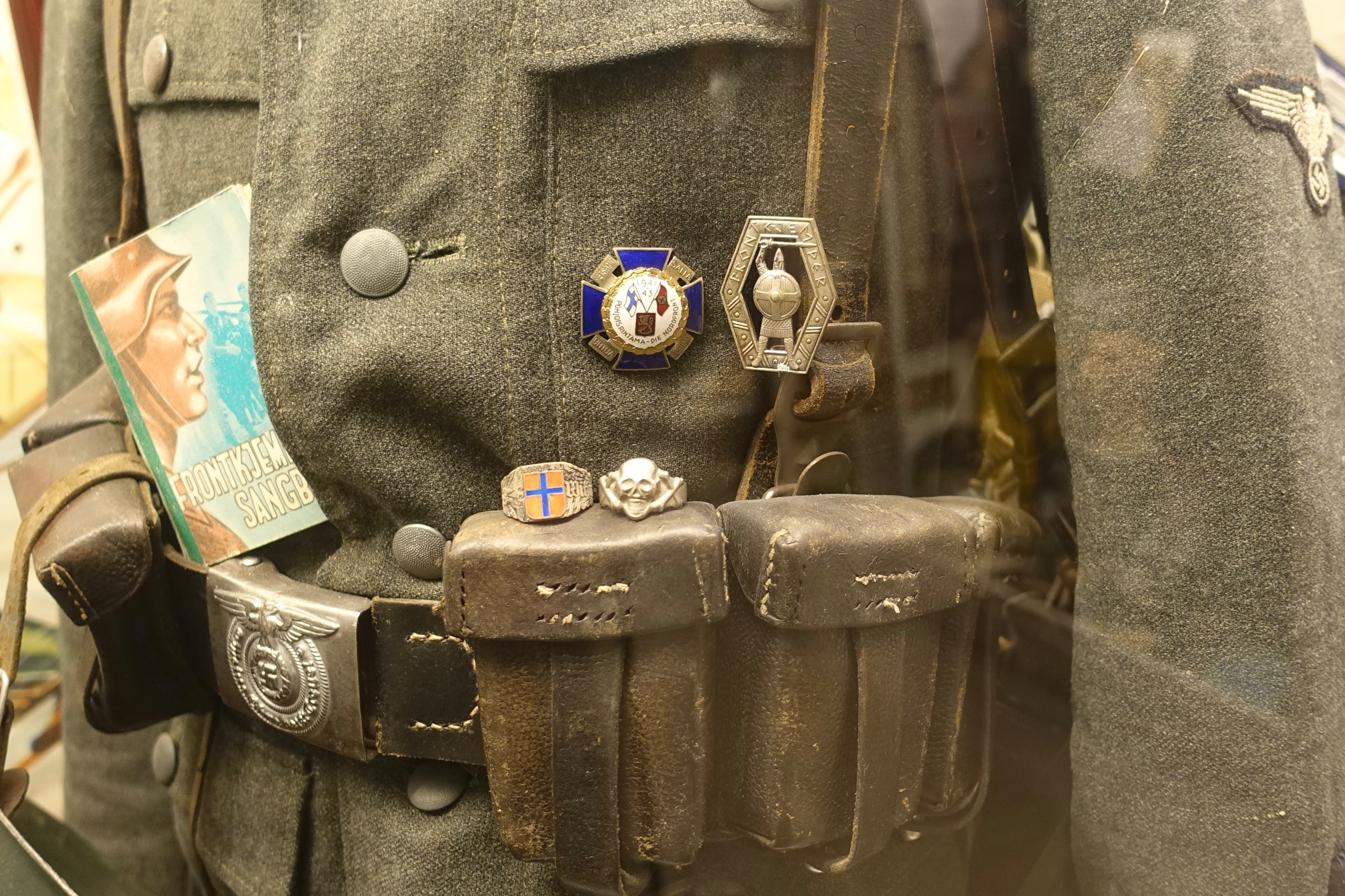
Soldiers' songbook in Norwegian ("Frontkjemper sangbok"), badges and rings; Lofoten War Museum, Norway.

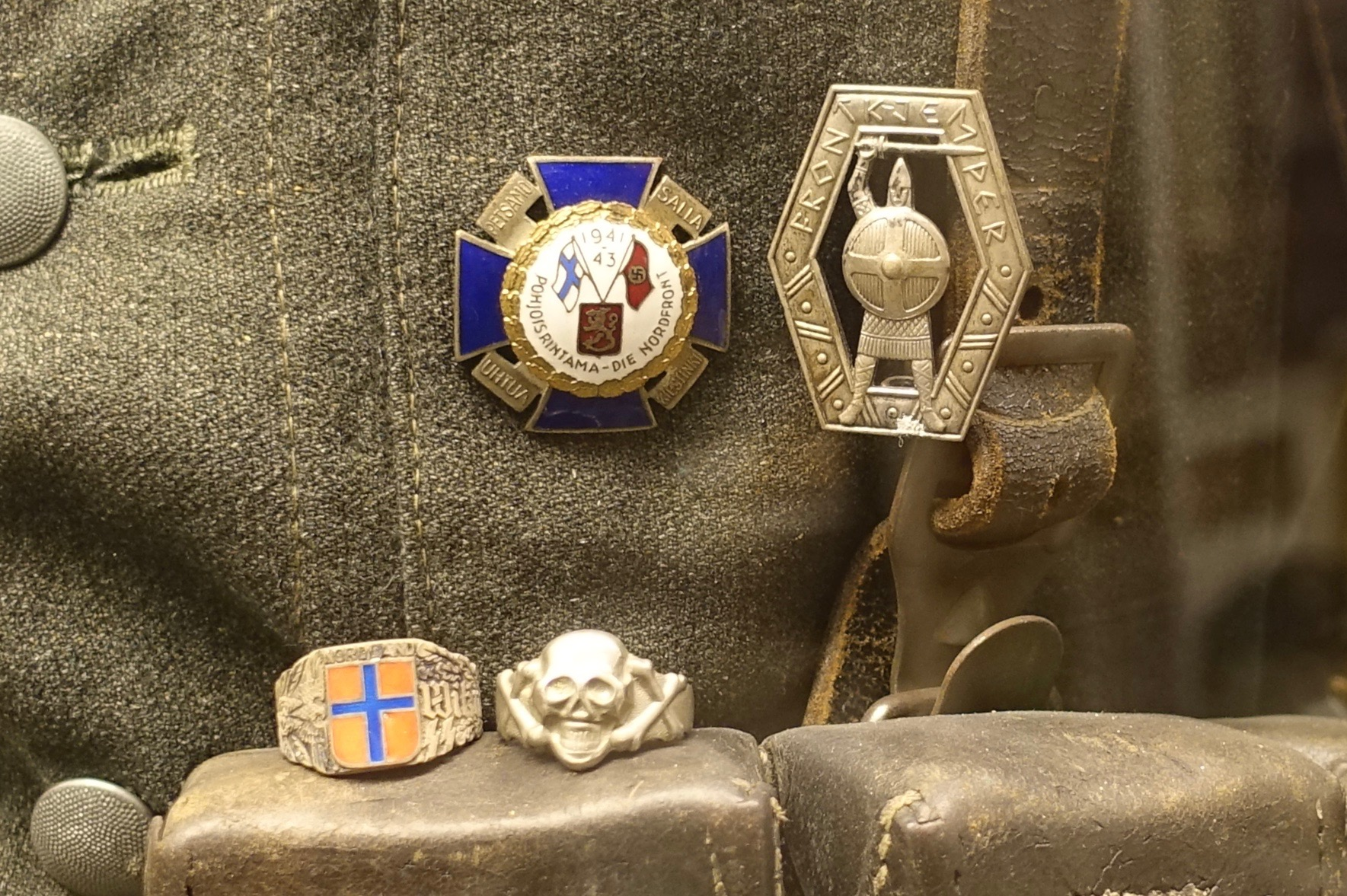
Close-up of the "Fronterkjempermerket", "Pohjoisrintama Die Nordfront 1941-1943" SS Nordland ring and skull ring; Lofoten War Museum, Norway.

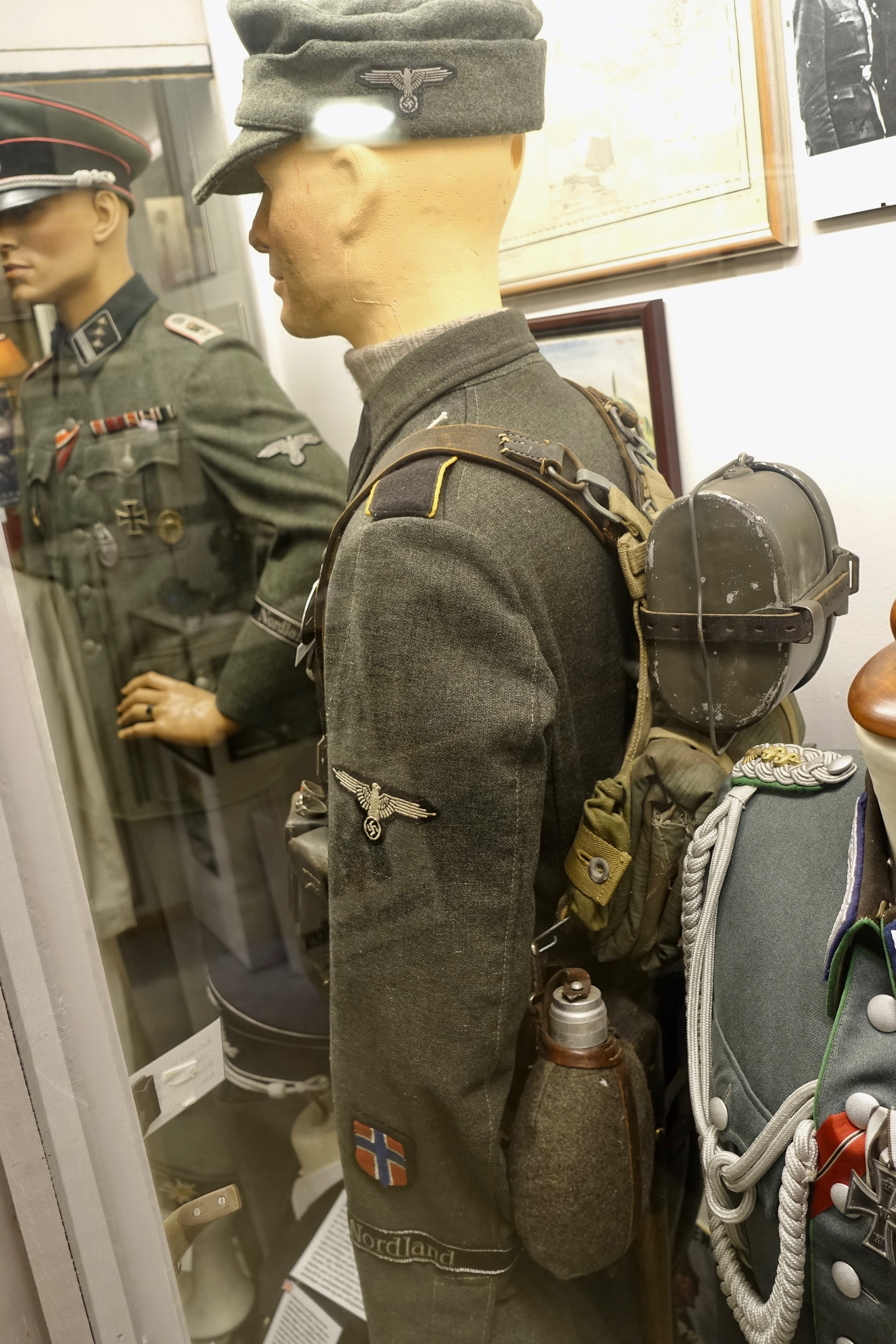
Enlisted "frontkjemper" ("Frontfighter" a Norwegian Waffen-SS volunteer) SS-Mann (private) of the Regiment Nordland, with visiblebackpack, canteen and lunch box; Lofoten War Museum, Norway.

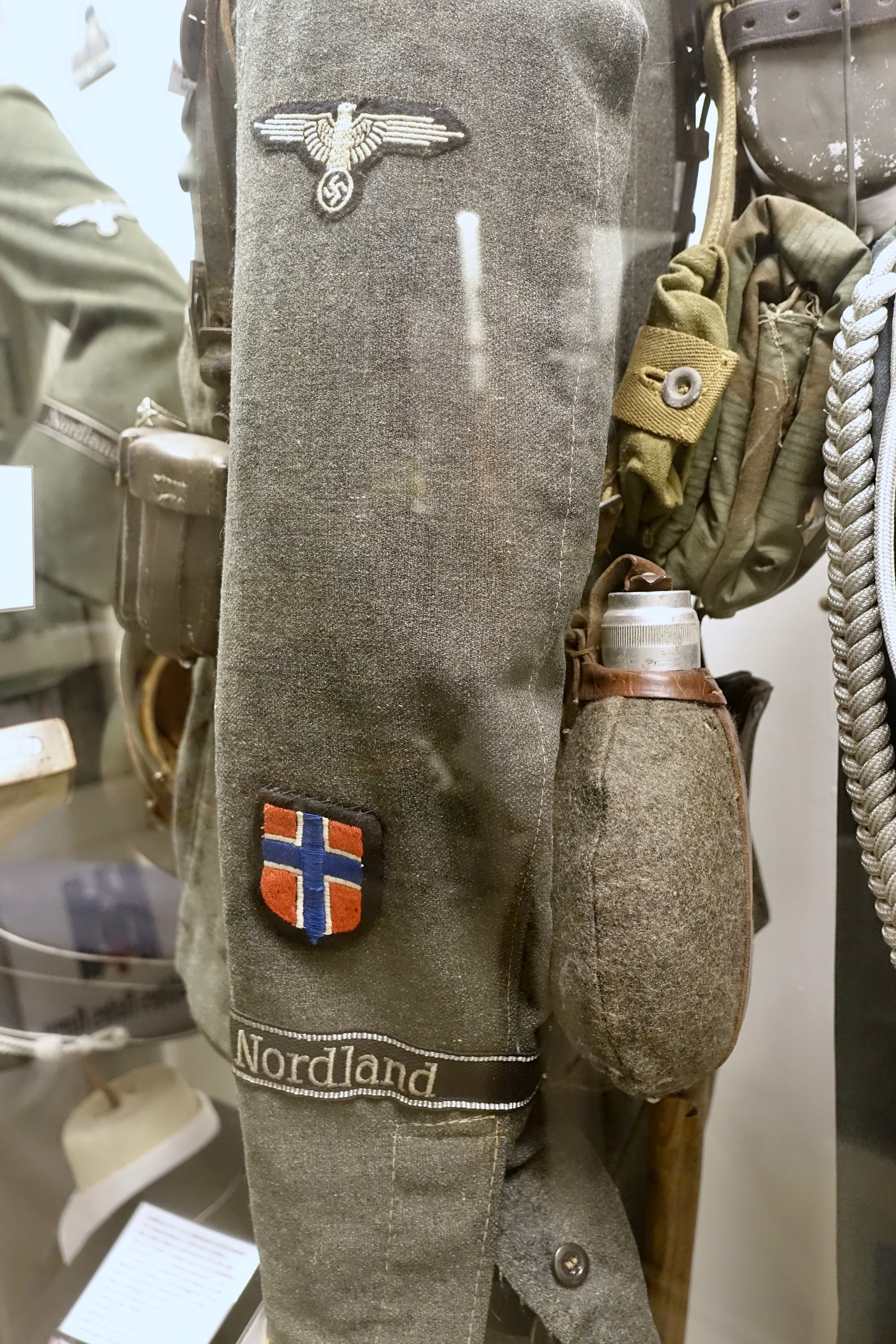
Close-up of the armband and flag; Lofoten War Museum, Norway.

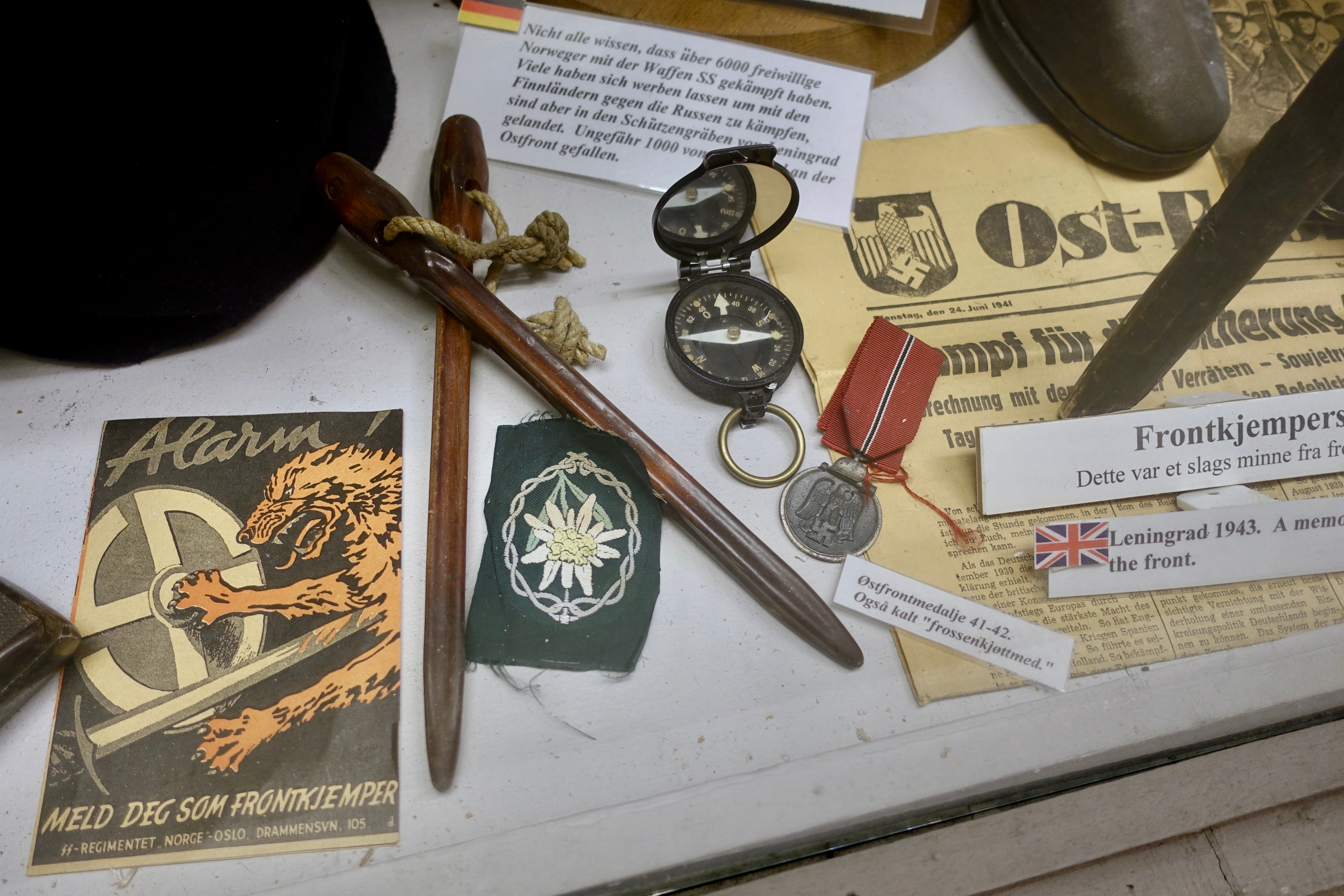
Display with recruitment brochure pamphlet for Frontkjemper (Norwegian Waffen-SS volunteers), tent pegs Zeltbahn, Gebirgsjäger Edelweiss emblem, Eastern Medal, compass, Ost-Front newspape, etc.; Lofoten War Museum, Norway.

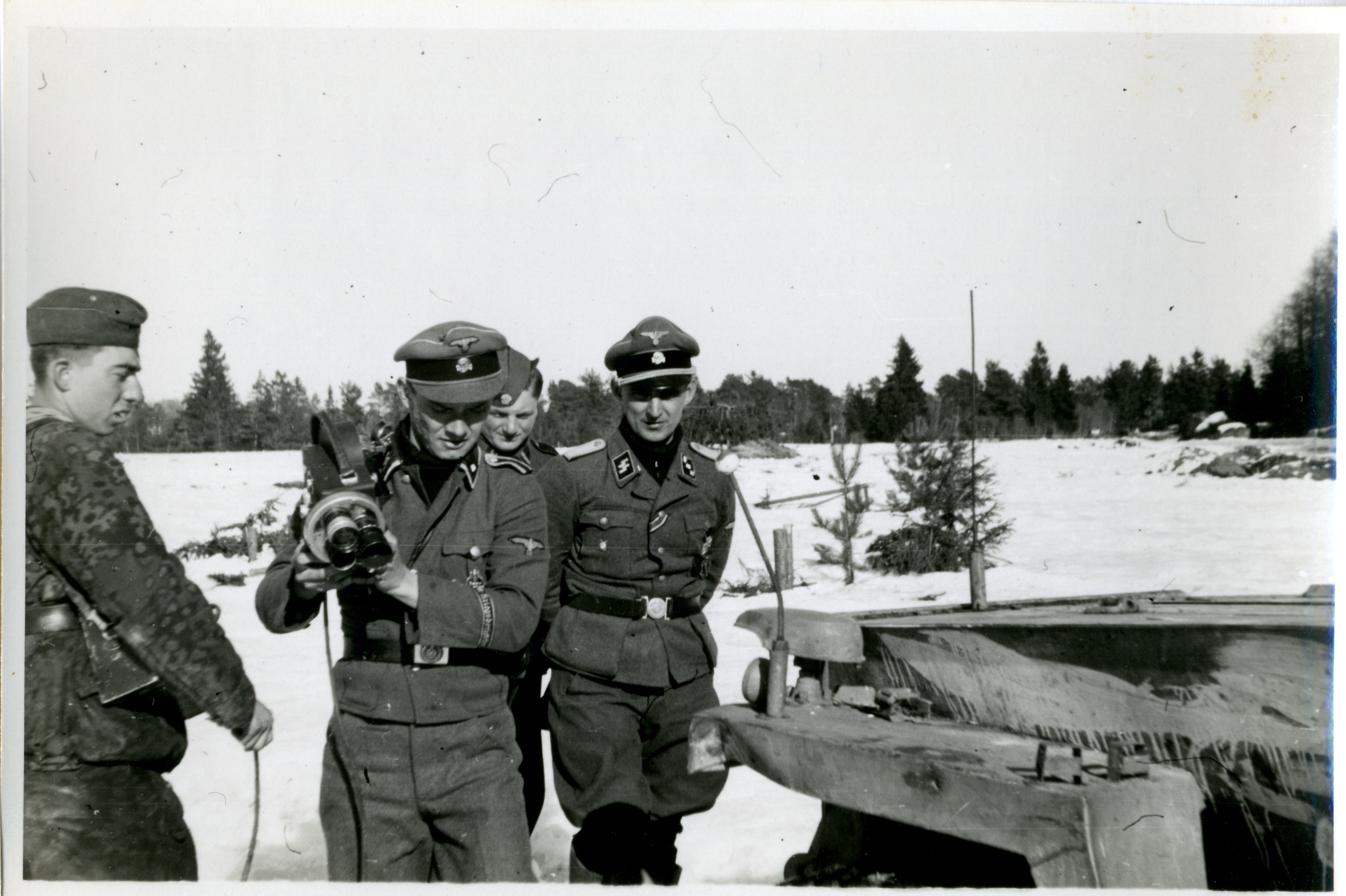
The propaganda department visits the Reconnaissance Bataillon of the Nordland Division in the Narva Front, 1944.

== See also ==
- List of Waffen-SS units
- Ranks and insignia of the Waffen-SS
- Waffen-SS foreign volunteers and conscripts
