= Prix Broquette-Gonin =

Former literary award of the French Academy

The prix Broquette-Gonin was a former prize awarded by the Académie française.

It rewarded four disciplines: history, literature, philosophy and poetry. A separate prize was awarded by subject.

== Prix Broquette-Gonin (history) ==
The prix Broquette-Gonin d'histoire "is intended to recompense the author of a philosophical, political or literary work deemed likely to inspire the love of truth, beauty and goodness". It was awarded from 1950 to 1973.

=== Laureates ===
1950

- Émile Magne (ensemble de son œuvre)

1952

- Henri Terrasse, Histoire du Maroc

1954

- Jacques Duron (unknown title)

1960

- André Beauguitte, Le chemin de Cocherel
- Roger Bersihand, Histoire du Japon
- Marcelin Defournaux, Pablo de Olavide
- Gabriel Girod de L'Ain, Désirée Clary
- Robert Latouche, Le film de l'histoire médiévale

1961

- Paul Albertini, La Corse militaire
- Henri Besseige, Herriot parmi nous
- Robert Cornevin, Histoire des peuples de l'Afrique noire
- Gaston Gérard, Dijon ma bonne ville et Le miroir du coin et du temps
- Jacques Humbert, Les Français en Savoie sous Louis XIII
- Roger Malcor, Les carnets de route et Grandeur de l'armée
- Michel Caffin de Mérouville, Le beau Dunois et son temps
- Marie-Louise Riche, Audacieuse Catherine de Sienne
- Georges Rivollet, La Corse militaire
- Jacques-Sylvestre de Sacy, Le maréchal de Mac Mahon, duc de Magenta
- Général Tournoux, Défense des frontières

1967

- René Rémond, La vie politique en France (1789-1848)

1973

- Gabriel de Broglie, Le général de Valence ou l'insouciance et la gloire

1974

- Joseph Joffo, Un sac de biles

1981

- Jacques Benoist-Méchin, Frédéric de Hohenstaufen – Le rêve excommunié (1980)

== Prix Broquette-Gonin (literature) ==
The prix Broquette-Gonin de littérature is "for authors of a philosophical, political or literary work deemed likely to inspire the love of truth, beauty and goodness". It was awarded from 1948 to 1989.

=== Laureates ===
1948

- Gaëtan Bernoville.

1949

- Bernard Guyon, La pensée politique et sociale de Balzac.

1953

- André Delacour.

1958

- Jacques-Henri Bornecque, La France et sa littérature.

1962

- Alain Bosquet, Verbe et Vertige.
- Alec Mellor, Nos frères séparés, les Francs-Maçons.
- Alice Wemyss, Les Protestants du mas d'Azil.
- André George, ensemble de son œuvre.
- Camille Monet, La Dernière campagne de Bayard.
- Charles Dédéyan, ensemble de son œuvre.
- Edmond Ruby, Bazaine, victime ou coupable ?.
- François Jourda de Vaux de Foletier, Les Tziganes dans l'ancienne France.
- Gaston Courty, La Reine androgyne, Christine de Suède.
- Gonzague Truc, Histoire de la littérature catholique contemporaine.
- chanoine Gros, Histoire de la Maurienne.
- Guy Godlewski, Trois cents jours d'exil.
- Henriette Chandet, Napoléon III, homme du XXe.
- Henry Valloton, Bismarck.
- Jean Regnault, Bazaine, victime ou coupable ?.
- Jean Roblin, Histoire de Coeuilly.
- Maurice Vaussard, ensemble de son œuvre.
- chanoine Pélissier, Les Papes limousins.
- Pierre Miquel, Poincaré.
- Pierre Verlet, Versailles.
- Raoul Blanchard, Ma jeunesse sous l'aile de Péguy.
- Raoul Stéphan, Histoire du Protestantisme français.
- Robert Étienne, Le Quartier nord-est de Volubilis.
- Solange de Montenay, L'Abbaye bénédictine Saint-Pierre de Bèze.
- Suzanne Bérard, La Genèse d'un roman de Balzac, Illusions perdues.
- Suzanne Desternes, Napoléon III, homme du XXe.

1963

- Albert Leclerc, Cinq ans dans le Constantinois.
- André Ducasse, La Guerre des Camisards.
- Arnaud Chaffanjon, La Marquise de Sévigné.
- Charles Bettelheim, L'Inde indépendante.
- Claire Lucque, Le Poids du monde.
- Francis Ley, De Krüdener et son temps.
- François d'Harcourt, Asie, réveil d'un monde.
- Gabriel Delaunay, Les Feuillets du temps volé.
- Georges Cerbelaud-Salagnac, Les Français au Canada.
- Georges Roth, Correspondance de Diderot.
- Gustave Lanctot, Histoire du Canada.
- Henri Auréas, Un de Napoléon : Miollis.
- Henriette Charrason, ensemble de son œuvre.
- Ivan Loiseau, Rivarol.
- Jacques Saint-Germain, La Reynie et la Police du Grand Siècle.
- Jean Bonnerot, Correspondance générale de Sainte-Beuve.
- Jean Lucas-Dubreton, Madrid.
- Jean Pernoud, Annibal.
- Jean-Marie Gerbault, Chers poisons.
- Jeannine Segelle, Et le pivert s'envole.
- Marie-Madeleine Delay, Traduction des Poèmes de Midu Brock.
- Marie-Madeleine Martin, ensemble de son œuvre.
- Maud de Belleroche, Cinq personnages en quête d'empereur.
- Maxime Mourin, Histoire des Nations européennes.
- Michel Garder, Une guerre pas comme les autres.
- Otto von Habsburg, L'Extrême-Orient n'est pas perdu.
- Pierre-Roger Gaussin, L'Abbaye de la Chaise-Dieu.
- Régine Pernoud, ensemble de son œuvre.
- René Sédillot, Paris.
- René-Louis Doyon, ensemble de son œuvre.
- Renée Kohn, Le Goût de la Fontaine.
- Robert Aron, Les Origines de la guerre d'Algérie.
- Robert Javelet, ensemble de son œuvre.

1964

- Abel Moreau, ensemble de son œuvre.
- André Rouquette, Un village du littoral au cours des siècles.
- Bruno de Solages, Initiation métaphysique.
- César Santelli.
- Charles Melchior de Molènes, La Carrière du Président Kennedy.
- Charles Oulmont, Carnets d'un magistrat.
- Emmanuel Roblès, La Remontée du fleuve.
- Engelbert Mveng, Histoire du Cameroun.
- Eugénie de Grèce, Pierre Napoléon-Bonaparte.
- François Baqué, Un village du littoral au cours des siècles.
- François de Saint-Just, Témoins de quatre siècles.
- Gaston Bonheur.
- Georges Lefranc, Le Mouvement socialiste dans la IIIe République.
- Georges Rivollet, Charles-Antoine Louis Morand, comte d'Empire.
- Guy de Brébisson, Radjpoutana.
- Guy Raïssac, Un soldat dans la tourmente.
- Henri d'Amfreville, Fragments solaires.
- Henri Fluchère, Traductions de T.S. Eliot.
- Henry Kahnweiller.
- Hubert-Pierre Dubois, Cheminot de Djibouti à Addis-Abeba.
- Ivan Gaussen, Poètes et prosateurs du Gard en langue d'oc.
- Jacques Toussaert, Le Sentiment religieux en Flandre à la fin du Moyen Âge.
- Jean Babelon, Les Monnaies racontent l'Histoire.
- Jean Delalande, Victor Hugo, dessinateur génial et halluciné.
- Jean Duhamel, Les Cinquante jours, de Waterloo à Plymouth.
- Jean Grassion, La Police secrète du premier Empire.
- Marc Valée, Cinq années de vie et de guerre en pays mayennais.
- Marguerite Castillon du Perron, Louis-Philippe et la Révolution.
- Nelly Adam, La Fin du jour.
- Pierre Grimal, L'Amour à Rome.
- Pierre Loubière, Les Mains ouvertes.
- Pierre Rondière, Démesurée et fabuleuse Sibérie.
- René Borricand, Testament de la reine Marie-Antoinette.
- René Guibert, Commencements....
- Roger Pierrot, Édition de la correspondance complète de Balzac.
- Suzanne Chantal, La Vie quotidienne au Portugal après le tremblement de terre de Lisbonne en 1755.
- Yves Congar, La Tradition et les Traditions.

1965

- André Chéron, Coussergues et les Sarret.
- Alfred Grosser, La Politique en France.
- André Ducasse, Balkans 14-18.
- Bernard Plongeron, Les réguliers de Paris devant le Serment constitutionnel.
- Christiane Desroches Noblecourt, Vie et mort d'un Pharaon.
- Eugène Boulitrop, Histoire de la Réforme en Savoie.
- François Goguel, La Politique en France.
- Germaine de Sarret, Coussergues et les Sarret.
- Gaston Sirjean, Encyclopédie généalogique des maisons souveraines du monde.
- Georges Beau, Lanrezac a-t-il sauvé la France ?.
- Georges Dupeux, La Société française de 1789 à 1960.
- Guy Michaud, Guide de France.
- Jacques Chauviré, La Terre et la Guerre.
- Jacques Habert, La Vie et les voyages de Jean de Verrazane.
- Jean Drouillet, Folklore du Nivernais et du Morvan, Tome IV.
- Jean Herbert, Aux sources du Japon. Le Shintô.
- Jean Raynal, Histoire des institutions judiciaires.
- Jean Thiry, Ulm, Trafalgar, Austerlitz; Eylau, Friedland, Tilsitt, Iéna.
- Jean-Étienne Martin-Allanic, Bougainville.
- Jean-Paul Charmeil, Les Trésoriers de France à l'époque de la Fronde.
- Léon Moreel, Dupleix.
- Léopold Gaubusseau, Lanrezac a-t-il sauvé la France ?.
- Louis Castex, Îles, relais du ciel.
- Louis Chaigne, Les Lettres contemporaines.
- Louis de Boisset, Plaisirs des jours.
- Louis Merlin, Le Vrai dossier de la télévision.
- Madeleine Baudoin, Histoire des groupes francs M.U.R. des Bouches-du-Rhône.
- Marcel Génermont, Bourbonnais, douce province au cœur de la France.
- Maurice Durosoy, Saumur.
- Pierre Gauroy, Les Affamés de la banquise.
- Raoul de Broglie, Chantilly.
- René Bady, L'Homme et son institution, de Montaigne à Bérulle.
- René d'Alsace, Le Livre de la Dame Blanche.
- Robert de La Croix, Des navires et des hommes.
- Robert Roby, D'un chien à l'autre.
- Simon Arbellot, La Fin du boulevard.

1966

- Arnaud Chaffanjon, Jean Racine et sa descendance.
- Denis de Rougemont, La Suisse ou l'Histoire d'un peuple heureux.
- Étienne Drioton, Les Pharaons à la conquête de l'art.
- Georges Lefranc, Histoire du Front populaire.
- Gérard de Catalogne, Haïti à l'heure du Tiers-Monde.
- Guillemette de Beauvillé, Jules II.
- Henri Dreyfus-Le Foyer, Traité de Philosophie générale.
- Henri Grimal, La Décolonisation, 1919-1963.
- Jacqueline Beaujeu-Garnier, Trois milliards d'hommes.
- Jacques Nanteuil, L'Enfant perdu dans la forêt.
- Jean Le Duc, Au Royaume du Son et de l'Image.
- Jean-Jacques Antier, L'Amiral de Grasse, Héros de l'Indépendance américaine.
- Léon Dion, Les Groupes et le Pouvoir politique aux États-Unis.
- Louis Chauvois, Descartes, sa méthode et ses erreurs en Physiologie.
- Marcelin Defourneaux, La Vie quotidienne en Espagne au siècle d'or.
- Martin-Civat, ensemble de ses travaux.
- Michel Antoine, Henry Desmarest.
- Michel Boutron, La Montagne et ses hommes.
- Mirko Grmek, Édition critique des Carnets de Claude Bernard.
- Norbert Jonard, La Vie quotidienne à Venise au XVIIIe.
- Pierre Des Mazis, Le Vocabulaire de l'économie politique.
- Pierre du Bourguet, Les Pharaons à la conquête de l'art.
- Pierre Flottes, L'Histoire et l'Inconscient humain.
- Pierre Miquel, Paul Huet : de l'Aube romantique à l'Aube impressionniste.
- René Naegelen, Cette vie que j'aime.
- Robert Didier, Isographie de l'Académie française.
- Roger Portal, Les Slaves, peuples et nations.
- Thérèse Goyet, L'Humanisme de Bossuet.

1967

- Alec Mellor, Histoire de l'Anticléricalisme français.
- Aline Coutrot, Les Forces religieuses dans la Société française.
- André Guérin, 1871 La Commune.
- Casimir Carrère, George Sand amoureuse.
- Charles de La Morandière, Histoire de la pêche française de la morue dans l'Amérique septentrionale.
- Édith Mora, Sappho.
- M. et Mme François Dreyfus, Les Forces religieuses dans la société française.
- Gabriel Perreux, La Vie quotidienne des civils en France pendant la Grande Guerre.
- Gustave Durassie, L'Almanach du combattant.
- Jacques Nicolle, Bernard Palissy, l'homme à la recherche d'un secret.
- Jean Boisselier, Asie du Sud-Est : le Cambodge.
- Jean Marquiset, Les Gens de Justice dans la littérature.
- Jean Thiry, Wagram.
- Jean-Claude Froelich, Les Animismes.
- Jean-Paul Garnier, Charles X.
- Maurice Rue, Paris des poètes.
- Mirko Grmek, Mille ans de chirurgie (Ve–XVe).
- Otto von Habsburg, Europe, champ de bataille ou grande puissance.
- Pierre Gauroy, Grandes aventures de la science.
- Pierre Huard, Mille ans de chirurgie (Ve–XVe).
- René Floriot, Deux femmes en cour d'assises.
- René Remond, La Vie politique en France (1789-1848).
- Renée de Saussine, La Vie des grands musiciens.
- Robert Soupault, Chirurgie mon métier.
- Suzanne Normand, Mes histoires de chats.
- Xavier de Montclos, Le Toast d'Alger (1890-1891).
- Zinaïda Schakovskoy, La Vie quotidienne à Saint-Pétersbourg à l'Époque romantique.

1968

- Auguste Joyau, La Martinique, carrefour du monde caraïbe.
- Charles-Noël Martin, Féerie du Monde invisible.
- Dominique de La Barre de Raillicourt, Nouveau dictionnaire des biographies françaises et étrangères.
- Gisèle d'Assailly, Un voyage autour du monde.
- Henri Coulet, Le Roman jusqu'à la Révolution.
- Jacques Harmand, Une campagne césarienne : Alésia.
- Jean Cazeneuve, L'Ethnologie.
- Louis Castex, De Clément Ader à Gagarine.
- Marcel Pacaut, Frédéric Barberousse.
- Michel Richard, La Vie quotidienne des Protestants sous l'Ancien Régime.
- Osmin Ricau, Aspects gascons des chemins de Saint-Jacques.
- Pierre Janton, John Knox 1513-1572.
- Pierre Nourry, À la Martinique.
- Pierre Rondière, Staline et le 22 juin 1941.
- Pierre Rousseau, Explications des paysages de France.
- René de Chantal, Marcel Proust, critique littéraire.
- Roger Bastide, Les Américaines noires.
- Sabine Flaissier, Marie-Antoinette en accusation.
- Sylvaine Marandon, L'Image de la France dans l'Angleterre victorienne.
- Xavier Joubert, Vaugirard et Grenelle au fil des siècles.
- Yvonne de Bremond d'Ars, Le Destin des choses.

1969

- André Beauguitte, Le Tiroir secret.
- Claire-Éliane Engel, Le Régent.
- Clément Borgal, Cocteau : Dieu, la mort, la poésie.
- Constantin de Grünwald, Les Nuits blanches de Saint-Pétersbourg.
- François Masnata, Pouvoir blanc, Révolte noire.
- François Sommer, La Chasse imaginaire.
- Georgette Elgey, La République des Contradictions.
- Huguette de Lancker, Théodora, Impératrice de Byzance.
- Jean de Raymond Jaurgoin, La Maison de Gramont (1040-1967).
- Michel Domange, Le Petit monde des Lamartine.
- Micheline Dupuy, Françaises Reines d'Angleterre.
- Monique Piettre, Au commencement était le mythe.
- Raymond Ritter, La Maison de Gramont (1040-1967).
- René Gandilhon, Naissance du Champagne.
- René Naegelen, Les Lourdes nuées.
- Robert-Lionel Séguin, La Civilisation traditionnelle de l'« habitant » aux XVIIe et XVIIIe siècles.
- Roger Zuber, Les « Belles infidèles » et la formation du goût classique.

1970

- Bernardine Melchior-Bonnet, Les Girondins.
- Charles Carrière, Marseille, Ville morte, la Peste de 1720.
- Claude-Paul Couture, Opération Jubilée.
- Déodat Roche, L'Église romaine et les Cathares albigeois.
- Étienne Furtos, Madagascar à l'échelle d'un continent.
- Féréol Rebuffat, Marseille et le négoce monétaire international (1785-1790) et Marseille, ville morte, la peste de 1120.
- François Bluche, Le Despotisme éclairé.
- François Reitel, Les Allemagnes.
- Gabriel Delaunay, L'Herbe et le Vent.
- Galienne Francastel, Le Portrait.
- Georges Beau, R.5. Les SS en Limousin, Périgord et Quercy.
- Germain Seligman, Roger de la Fresnaye.
- Guy Sagne, L'Ennui dans la littérature française de Baudelaire à Laforgue.
- Jacques Gandouin, Correspondance et rédaction administratives.
- Jacques Réda, for lifetime achievement.
- Jean Gaudon, Victor Hugo, le Temps de la Contemplation.
- Jean Laugier, for lifetime achievement.
- Jean-Charles Sournia, Mythologies de la médecine moderne.
- Jean-Claude Margolin, Quatorze années de bibliographie érasmienne.
- Léopold Gaubusseau, R.5. Les SS en Limousin, Périgord et Quercy.
- Marcel Courdurie, Marseille et le négoce monétaire international (1785-1790).
- Maurice Parturier, Morny et son temps.
- Maurice Rheims, La Vie d'artiste.
- Michel Brugière, La Première Restauration et son budget.
- Pierre Oster, for lifetime achievement.
- Robert de Luppé, Les Idées littéraires de Madame de Staël.
- Robert Gaud, La Maison brûlée.
- Théodore Quoniam, Aux jardins des contradictions.
- Yves Courrière, Le Temps des Léopards.

1971

- Arnaud de Mareuil, for lifetime achievement.
- Charles Le Quintrec, for lifetime achievement.
- Édith Boissonnas, for lifetime achievement.
- Edmond Humeau, for lifetime achievement.
- Eugène Vinaver, À la recherche d'une poétique médiévale.
- Fernand Verhesen, for lifetime achievement.
- François Jourda de Vaux de Foletier, Mille ans d'histoire des Tziganes.
- Henry Contamine, Diplomatie et diplomates sous la Restauration.
- Jean Bourdeillette, for lifetime achievement.
- Jean Serruys, De Colbert au Marché commun.
- Jean-Christian Spahni, Itinéraire Sud-Américain. Les Indiens de la Cordillère des Andes.
- Jean-François Chiappe, Georges Cadoudai ou la Liberté.
- Louis Rougier, Le Génie de l'Occident.
- Maurice Toesca, Vie d'Alfred de Musset.
- Mohammed Dib, for lifetime achievement.
- Paul Biver, Abbayes, monastères et couvents de Paris.
- Paul Lesourd, Les Mystères d'Israël.
- Philippe Ménard, Le Rire et le sourire dans le roman courtois en France au Moyen Âge (1150-1250).
- M. et Mme Pierre Paraf, Vies quotidiennes contemporaines en Israël.
- Pierre Sabatier, ensemble de son œuvre.
- René Jouveau, Histoire du Félibrige.
- René Sédillot, ABC de l'économie.
- Roger Blanche, La Logique et son histoire d'Aristote à Russel.
- Simone Chevallier, for lifetime achievement.
- Sylvère Monod, Histoire de la littérature anglaise de Victoria à Élisabeth II.
- Tania Ghirshman, Archéologue malgré moi.
- Yves Le Gallo, Bretagne.

1972

- Alain Daniélou, Histoire de l'Inde.
- André Varagnac, La Conquête des énergies.
- Chantal Dupille, Histoire de la cour des Miracles.
- Charles-Noël Martin, Jules Verne, sa vie, son œuvre.
- Félix Ponteil, Les Classes bourgeoises et l'avènement de la démocratie. Les bourgeois et la démocratie sociale (1914-1968).
- Francis Ley, La Russie. Paul Krüdener et les soulèvements nationaux (1814-1858).
- Henri Chabrol, for his lifetime achievement in poetry.
- Henri Michel, La Drôle de guerre.
- Hubert Deschamps, Histoire de la traite des noirs de l'Antiquité à nos jours.
- Hubert Juin, for lifetime achievement.
- Jacques Nantet, Panorama de la littérature noire d'expression française.
- James Sacré, for lifetime achievement.
- Jean Boyer, La Peinture et la gravure à Aix-en-Provence aux XVIe, XVIIe et XVIIIe siècles.
- Jean-Pierre Gutton, La Société et les Pauvres. L'exemple de la généralité de Lyon (1534-1789).
- Olivier Loras, Rencontre avec Henri Michaux.
- Paul Lesourd, Le Cardinal Midzenty.
- Philippe Jullian, d'Annunzio.
- Pierre Miquel, La Paix de Versailles et l'opinion publique française.
- Pierre-André Toutain, Haussmann.
- Pierre-Marie Auzas, Prosper Mérimée : notes de voyage.
- Simone Balayé, Les Carnets de voyage de Madame de Staël.

1973

- André Miguel, for lifetime achievement.
- Anne-Marie Esnoul, L'Hindouisme.
- Charles-Marie Ternes, La Vie quotidienne en Rhénanie à l'époque romaine.
- Félix Tavernier, La Vie quotidienne à Marseille de Louis XIV à Louis Philippe.
- Frédéric-André Engel, Le Monde précolombien des Andes.
- Gabriel Ardant, Histoire de l'impôt.
- Georges Combet, Calliope et Minos. Essai d'une physique de l'art.
- Georges Gusdorf, Dieu, la nature, l'homme au siècle des Lumières.
- Georges Spillmann, Napoléon III prophète méconnu.
- Gérard Mourgue, Bleu marine.
- Guillaume Berthier de Sauvigny, Metternich et la France après le Congrès de Vienne.
- Hervé Savon, Du Cannibalisme au génocide.
- Huguette Laurenti, Paul Valéry et le théâtre.
- Ivan Loiseau, L'Ancienne Monarchie française et son destin.
- Jean d'Arbaumont, Entre Glières et Vercors.
- Jean Noli, Le Choix. Souffrance et gloire de la marine française pendant la seconde guerre mondiale.
- Jean Serry, La Danse.
- Joël Schmidt, Vie et mort des Esclaves.
- Louis Amade, for lifetime achievement.
- Michel Ragon, Histoire mondiale de l'architecture et de l'urbanisme modernes.
- Paul Idatte, Sachez rédiger pour réussir dans votre profession.
- Pierre Béarn, for lifetime achievement.
- Pierre Brodin, Présences contemporaines.
- Pierre Sipriot, for lifetime achievement.
- Raymond Chevallier, Les voies romaines.
- Raymond d'Unienville, Hier Suffren.
- René Girard, La Violence et le Sacré.
- Roger Fayolle, Sainte-Beuve et le XVIIIe.
- Roger Munier, L'Instant.
- Yvon Bizardel, Les Américains à Paris sous la Révolution.

1974

- Amélie-Marie Goichon, Jordanie réelle.
- Benigno Cacérès, Des hommes au bord de l'eau.
- Charles de La Roncière, Un changeur florentin du trecento. Lippo di Fede del Sega.
- Charles Guichonnet, L'Histoire de la Savoie.
- Claudine Jardin, Virginia Woolf.
- Félix Boisset, Voyage et fantaisie. Mémoires d'un naïf.
- Georges Lefranc, Les Gauches en France. 1789-1972.
- Jacqueline Theurillat, Les Mystères de Bomarzo et les jardins symboliques de la Renaissance.
- Jacques Baeyens, Les Français à Corfou.
- Jean Boisson, Le Retour des cendres.
- Jean Vartier, La vie quotidienne en Lorraine au XIXe.
- Joseph Joffo, Un sac de billes.
- chanoine Léon Billet, Bernard de Ventadour.
- Marc Guyon, Néfas.
- Marcel Migeo, Les Rostand.
- Marguerite Cazaux, Giboulées.
- Maxime Mourin, Reddition sans conditions.
- Nadia de Soester, Jusqu'à mon dernier souffle.
- Paul Lesourd, Montmartre.
- Paul-Louis Duchartre, Dictionnaire analogique de la Chasse.
- Philippe Julian, Les Symbolistes.
- Pierre Joannon, L'Histoire de l'Irlande.
- Pierre Torreilles, Le Désert croît.
- Raphaël Molho, L'Ordre et les ténèbres ou la naissance d'un mythe du XVIIe chez Sainte-Beuve.
- Raymond Lebègue, Édition des Œuvres complètes de Robert Garnier.
- Roger Béteille, La Vie quotidienne en Rouergue avant 1914.
- Simone Petrement, La Vie de Simone Weil.
- Suzanne Reveillaud-Kriz, L'Odyssée d'un peintre.
- Yves Cazaux, Jeanne d'Albret.

1975

- Abram Krol, Image d'écume.
- Adrien Carré, Mémoires du chevalier de Cotignon.
- Aimé Becker, Claudel et l'Interlocuteur invisible.
- Alain Lerbret, Sources.
- Alain Morin, Les Grands froids.
- Aurélia Stapert, L'Ange roman dans la pensée et dans l'art.
- Bernard Champigneulle, Paris, architecture, sites et jardins.
- Bernard Copel, Le Serrement d'Hippocrate.
- Bernard Plongeron, La Vie quotidienne du clergé français au XVIIIe.
- Claude Fohlen, La Société américaine 1865-1970.
- Constantin de Grünwald, Société et civilisation russes au XIXe.
- Émile Rostain, Le Château de Oiron. Renaissance.
- Gösta Wilander, Paris.
- Georges Bordonove, Les Marins de l'an II.
- Georges Elgozy, Le Bluff du futur.
- Gérard Mourgue, Le Cœur et l'Esprit.
- Guy Pedroncini, Pétain, général en chef 1917-1918.
- Hélène Demoriane, L'Art de reconnaître les instruments scientifiques du temps passé.
- Jacques Chevrier, Littérature nègre.
- Jacques Gandoin, Guide du protocole et des usages.
- Jacques Pingle, Histoire des Espagnols.
- Jacques Wolgensinger, Raid Afrique.
- Jean Kobs, Le Kobzar de l'exil.
- Job de Roincé, Le Colonel Armand, marquis de la Rouerie.
- Louis Amade, Il faut me croire sur parole.
- Marc Valée, Pierre de Ronsard et ses muses et inspiratrices.
- Maurice de Brossard, Histoire maritime du monde.
- Maurice Demarle, L'Âme et le Grain.
- Michel Faré, Le Grand siècle de la nature morte en France : le XVIIe.
- Michel Milan, Cantos d'Éphèse.
- Michel Rachline, Peau-Être.
- Paul Keineg, Lieux communs.
- Paul Sérant, Le Mont Saint Michel ou l'Archange pour tous les temps.
- Philippe Dumaine, Aux passeurs de la nuit.
- Raymond Aubert, Journal d'un bourgeois sous la Révolution. En pantoufles sous la Terreur.
- Raymond Cazelles, 24 Parapoèmes.
- René Cousin, Confidences à mon chien.
- René Héron de Villefosse, L'Anti-Versailles et le Palais-Royal de Philippe Égalité.
- Robert Christophe, Le Miracle de nos prisons.
- Vera Feyder, Passionnaire.
- Yves Mabin Chennevière, L'Imaginaire progéniture.

1976

- André Beauguitte, Plume de perroquet.
- André Bret, Lumières d'ombres.
- Bernard Auffray, Pierre de Margerie (1861-1942) et la vie diplomatique de son temps.
- David Feuerwerker, L'Émancipation des Juifs en France. De l'Ancien Régime à la fin du Second Empire.
- Charles-Louis Foulon, Le Pouvoir en Province à la Libération.
- Francis Gutton, La Chevalerie militaire en Espagne.
- Georges Frêche, Toulouse et la région Midi-Pyrénées au siècle des lumières vers 1670-1789.
- Georges Lefranc, Histoire du travail et des travailleurs.
- Georges Roditi, L'Esprit de perfection.
- Henry Bergasse, Le Tocsin de la décadence.
- Jacques Jourquin, Ils s'appellent tous Martin.
- Jean Balcou, Fréron contre les philosophes.
- Jean Bastaire, Péguy l'insurgé.
- Jean des Cars, Louis II de Bavière ou le roi foudroyé.
- Jean Dodo, Symphonie en noir et blanc.
- Jean Mambrino, Sainte-Lumière.
- Jean Monteaux, Barnum.
- Louis Rey, Groenland univers de cristal.
- Marie-Thérèse Chalon, Une vie comme un jour.
- Maurice Bidaux, La fin des culs terreux (Odyssée paysanne).
- Monique Piettre, La Condition féminine à travers les âges.
- Neagu Djuvara, Civilisations et lois historiques.
- Olivier Merlin, L'Opéra de Paris.
- Paul Lesourd, Lafayette ou le sortilège de l'Amérique.
- Raymond Oursel, Art en Savoie.
- Raymond Silva, Joseph Balsamo alias Cagliostro.
- Serge Huet, Chants pour les nu-pieds.
- Solange Duflos, Sur les rivages.
- Viorica Stavila, Une femme nue devant Dieu.
- Yves Durand, La Maison de Durfort à l'époque moderne.
- Yves Mabin Chennevière, Originel.

1977

- Abdelkebir Khatibi, L'art calligraphique arabe.
- Abram Krol, La Redite non pareille.
- Arnaud Chaffanjon, Ces grandes familles qui ont fait la France.
- Bruno Durocher, Gagner la lumière.
- Charles d'Aragon, La Résistance sans héroïsme.
- Claire Laffay, Miroir abîme.
- Danielle Baraton, La Fâcheuse Montagne (Sancerre 1572-1573).
- François Geoffroy-Dechaume, La Chine face au monde.
- Guy d'Arcangues, Madame, petit soldat.
- Jacques Michel, La Vie aventureuse et mouvementée de Charles Henri, comte d'Estaing.
- Jean Gagé, La Chute des Tarquins et les débuts de la République romaine.
- Jean Markale, Le Roi Arthur et la société celtique.
- Jean-Pierre Chabrol, La Cévenne par ses gens.
- Joseph Toussaint, Monseigneur Le Nordez et la rupture des relations entre la France et l'Église.
- Louis Chauvet, L'Été d'Osseja, la Pensée Universelle
- Luis Porquet, Jusqu'au premier jour du monde.
- Marcel de Faget, Guerre et Geôles.
- Marie-Claire Bancquart, Édition "La Horla et autres contes cruels et fantastiques", de Guy de Maupassant.
- Maurice Métral, L'Appel du soir.
- Michel Dard, Irréversibles.
- Michel Pastoureau, La Vie quotidienne en France et en Angleterre au temps des chevaliers de la Table ronde.
- Michel Perrin, Le Chemin des Indiens morts.
- Michelle Goby, Portugal.
- Mohamed Sijelmassi, L'Art calligraphique arabe.
- Paul Courget, Le Gué des Bergères.
- Pierre Debray-Ritzen, Psychologie de la littérature et de la création littéraire.
- canon Pierre Narbaitz, Le Matin basque.
- Pierre Pierrard, La Vie quotidienne dans le Nord au XIXe.
- Reiner Schürmann, Les Origines.
- René de Chambrun, Les Prisons des Lafayette.
- Roger Glachant, Suffren et le temps de Vergennes.
- Suzanne Vayssac, La Lecture en marge d'Alain.
- Yvonne Deslandres, Le Costume, image de l'homme.

1978

- Bernard Pierre, Le Roman du Nil.
- Denise Basdevant, Dans la vallée du Nil. Du Caire à Abou-Simbel.
- François Gibault, Céline (1894-1932). Le temps des espérances.
- Geneviève Viollet-le-Duc, Édition de la Correspondance de Paul-Louis Courrier.
- Georges Baudot, Utopie et Histoire au Mexique.
- Gilbert Gadoffre, Du Bellay et le sacré.
- Henriette Levillain, Le Rituel poétique de Saint-John Perse.
- Isabelle Rouffiange, Lecture syntaxique des Mémoires de Saint-Simon.
- Jacques Godechot, La Vie quotidienne en France sous le Directoire.
- Jacques Le Goff, Pour un autre Moyen Âge.
- Jean Joubert, Les Poèmes.
- Jean-Paul Goret, Fleurs pérégrines.
- Louis Allègre, Le Ciel ! ouvert toute la nuit.
- Marianne Mahn-Lot, Barthelemy de Las Casas, l'Évangile et la Force.
- Maurice Toesca, Jules Renard.
- Paul-Marie de La Gorce, L'Après-guerre.
- Philippe Joutard, La Légende des Camisards. Une sensibilité au passé.
- Raymond Beyeler, Temps mort.
- Raymonde Anna Rey, Augustine Rouvière, cévenole.
- Suzanne de Lapierre, Ma Cévenne à l'heure ancienne.
- Tzonev Stoyan, Le Financier dans la Comédie française sous l'Ancien Régime.

1979

- Abel Verdier, À la recherche de la Vérité.
- Alice Cluchier, L'Envolée du silence.
- André Le Révérend, Lyautey, écrivain.
- André Wartelle, Bibliographie historique et critique d'Eschyle (1518-1974).
- Anne-Marie Brisbarre, Bergers des Cévennes.
- Auguste Anglès, André Gide et le premier groupe de la nouvelle Revue française. La formation du groupe et les années d'apprentissage (1890-1910).
- Bernard Blancotte, Une Rose des Vents pour un homme oublié.
- Bernard Dufour, La Pierre et le Seigle. Histoire de Villefranche-de-Rouergue.
- Gabrielle Sentis, L'Oisans (histoire, traditions, légendes).
- Gérard Simon, Kepler, astronome-astrologue.
- Guy Thuillier, La vie quotidienne des domestiques en France au XIXe.
- Jacques Raphaël-Leygues, Reflets des eaux vives.
- Jean Albert-Sorel, Mémoires d'un temps.
- Jean Durtal, Les Raisins de septembre.
- Jean Mouchet, Leclerc : débuts méconnus de son historique épopée, Londres-Cameroun 1940.
- Jean Randier, L'Instrument de Marine.
- Jean Richard, Histoire de la Bourgogne.
- Jean-Pierre Darracq, Miura.
- Kuan do Pham, Au pays du lotus.
- Lilia de Vendeuvre, Le Melon Cantaloup, une vie en tranches.
- Louis Amade, Rajuste ta couronne et pars Coquelicot.
- Louis Lambert, Formulaires des officiers de police judiciaire.
- Louis Le François, Nouvelles méditations poétiques.
- Luc de Goustine, Le Printemps, la Commune et le Roi.
- Marcelle Chirac, Aix-en-Provence à travers la littérature française.
- Norbert Jonard, Giacomo Leopardi. Essais de Biographie intellectuelle.
- Pierre Guiral, La Vie quotidienne des domestiques en France au XIXe.
- Régis Boyer, Les Sagas islandaises.
- Robert Favreau, La Ville de Poitiers à la fin du Moyen Âge.

1980

- André Grabar, Les Voies de la création en iconographie chrétienne.
- Bernard Quilliet, Le Journal de la Révolution française (juillet 1789-juillet 1794).
- Charles-Emmanuel Dufourcq, La Vie quotidienne dans l'Europe médiévale sous domination arabe.
- Christian de Bartillat, La Culture aux ailes de brique.
- Daniel Klébaner, L'Adieu au baroque.
- Evrard des Millières, Grand Erre.
- Gilbert Durand, Figures mythiques et visages de l'œuvre.
- Gilbert Prouteau, Le Dernier défi de Georges Clemenceau.
- Gilberte Vezin, Au bord du mystère.
- Hermine Venot-Focké, Poète prends ton luth.
- Inès Murat, Colbert.
- Jacqueline Jomaron, Georges Pitoeff, metteur en scène.
- Jean Butin, Henri Béraud : sa longue marche de la gerbe d'or au pain noir.
- Jean Cevenne, Le Chien sirène.
- Jean Piat, Les Plumes du paon.
- Jean-Charles Varennes, Le Bourbonnais, terre des sources.
- Jean-Louis Magnan, Le Notariat et le monde moderne.
- Jean-Noël Sissia, Les Cœurs obligés.
- Kalistrat Salia, Histoire de la nation géorgienne.
- Marie-Madeleine Davy, Initiation médiévale.
- Marko Markovic, La Philosophie de l'Inégalité et les idées politiques de Nicolas Berdiaev.
- Michel Mouligneau, Chronos ou l'expropriation.
- Nicole Toussain du Wast, Rachel - Amours et tragédie.
- Paul Lorenz, Poèmes dramatiques.
- René Jullian, Le Mouvement des arts, du romantisme au symbolisme.
- Sylvain Auroux, La Sémiotique des encyclopédistes.
- Yvonne Verdier, Façons de dire, façons de faire (la laveuse, la couturière, la cuisinière).

1981

- Alex Wassilieff, Le Pacha.
- Anne Pons, La Maison des jours d'autrefois.
- Antoine Marès, Un siècle à travers trois Républiques : Georges et Édouard Bonnefous 1880-1980.
- Chantal Vogler, Constance II et l'Administration.
- Charles Charras, Le Cœur dans le chapeau.
- Daniel Atger, La Traversée d'un siècle (1881-1981). L'Église réformée de l'Annonciation.
- Didier Rimaud, Des grillons et des anges.
- Dominique Venner, Histoire de l'armée rouge.
- François des Varennes, L'Œil intérieur.
- François Hartog, Le Miroir d'Hérodote.
- François Lebrun, Histoire des catholiques en France.
- Fred Rossier, La Vigne de Sillery.
- Gabriel E. Mfomo, Soirées au village.
- Guy Thuillier, La Vie quotidienne des députés en France de 1871 à 1914.
- Henri Mendras, La Sagesse et le Désordre. France 1980.
- Jacqueline Hellin, Nicolas-Claude Fabri de Peiresc.
- Jacques Benoist-Méchin, Frédéric de Hohenstaufen ou le rêve excommunié.
- Jacques Lorcey, La Comédie française.
- Jean Roudaut, Ce qui nous revient.
- Jean Séverin, Une vie peuplée d'enfants.
- Jean-François Fogel, Morand-Express.
- Jean-Louis Ezine, Les Écrivains sur la sellette.
- Jean-Marie Benoist, La Génération sacrifiée.
- Jean-Michel Pelous, Amour précieux, amour galant.
- Joseph Rovan, La Bavière.
- Lazare Landau, De l'aversion à l'estime (juifs et catholiques en France de 1919 à 1939).
- Loránd Gáspár, Égée, suivi de Judée.
- Marcel Cordier, Heucheloup ou la Lorraine sauvage.
- Marcel Vogne, La Presse périodique en Franche-Comté des origines.
- Michel Laval-Sournac, Les Locomotives rouges.
- Michel Oriano, Les Travailleurs de la frontière. Bûcherons, cow-boys et cheminots américains au XIXe.
- Patrice Franceschi, Ils ont choisi la liberté.
- Paul Faure, Ulysse, le Crétois.
- Pierre Guiral, La Vie quotidienne des députés en France de 1871 à 1914.
- Pierre Osenat, Le Dieu des Îles.
- Pierre-Louis Rey, L'Œuvre romanesque de Gobineau.
- René Virgoulay, Blondel et le modernisme.
- Suzanne d'Huart, Journal de Marie-Amélie, reine des Français (1800-1866).

1982

- André Gauchet, L'Envers du soleil.
- Anka Muhlstein, James de Rothschild (1792-1868).
- Anne-Marie Sohn, Le Monde contemporain 1914-1945.
- Bernard Manciet, Le Triangle des Landes.
- Christian Jacq, L'Égypte des grands Pharaons.
- Edmond Reboul, Les Mirages du désert.
- François Gibault, Céline (1944-1961), cavalier de l'Apocalypse.
- Françoise Brunel, Le Monde contemporain 1914-1945.
- Georges Dethan, Mazarin, un homme de paix à l'âge baroque (1602-1661).
- Georges Hourdin, Lamennais, prophète et combattant de la liberté.
- Henri Michel, Paris allemand.
- Henriette Dibon, Le Marquis de Baroncelli.
- Jacques Bouillon, Le Monde contemporain 1914-1945.
- Jacques Gernet, Chine et Christianisme.
- Jacques Le Goff, La Naissance du purgatoire.
- Jacques Levron, Trois sœurs pour un roi ou la Cour de Versailles au début du règne de Louis XV.
- Jacques Mompeut, Les Faïences de Moustiers.
- Jacques Raphaël-Leygues, Les Mutins de la Mer Noire (avril 1919, des marins français se révoltent).
- Jacques Ruffié, Histoire de la louve.
- Jean-Charles Varennes, Les Bourbon Busset.
- Jean-Louis Vallas, Par-delà les étoiles.
- Jean-Luc Barré, Les Mutins de la Mer Noire (avril 1919, des marins français se révoltent).
- Jehan Despert, Orénoque.
- Maïse Ploquin-Caunan, Sous les regards de Dieu.
- Marcelle Chirac, Journal de campagne de l'amiral de Bauffremont, prince de Lestenois dans les pays barbaresques (1766).
- Margaret Simpson-Maurin, L'Univers fantastique de Marcel Brion.
- Max Chamson, Les Grandes Alpes françaises aujourd'hui.
- Michel André, L'Admission dans les grands ordres de chevalerie d'aujourd'hui.
- Niangoran-Bouah, Introduction à la drummologie.
- Philippe Encausse, Le Maître Philippe de Lyon, thaumaturge et "Homme de Dieu".
- Pierre Masset, L'Empereur Mao. Essai sur le maoïsme.
- Pierre Pierrard, Les Papes et la France. Vingt siècles d'histoire commune.
- René Borricand, Châteaux et bastides du pays d'Aix.
- Robert Legrand, Babeuf et ses compagnons de route.
- Robert Marteau, Mont-Royal.
- Robert Schilling, La Religion romaine de Vénus.
- Yves Masselot, Emmanuel, Mai, Lumière.

1983

- Abel Verdier, Manuel pratique des Consulats.
- André Corvisier, Louvois.
- André Wartelle, Lexique de la « Rhétorique » d'Aristote.
- Andrée Thenot, Jean Rostand, prophète clairvoyant et fraternel.
- Bernard Yon, Jean-Louis Guez de Balzac, épîtres latines.
- Christian Delacampagne, L'Invention du racisme.
- Dominique Autié, Approches de Roger Caillois.
- Élisabeth Claverie, L'Impossible mariage, violence et parenté en Gévaudan, XVIIe, XVIIIe et XIXe siècles.
- Étienne Borne, Les nouveaux inquisiteurs.
- Fernand de Saint-Simon, La Place Vendôme.
- Francis Jacques, Différence et subjectivité.
- François Collaveri, La Franc-maçonnerie des Bonaparte.
- Henri Aubanel, Camarguaises. Un gardian en hiver.
- Ivan Gobry, Amour et mariage.
- Jacques de Ricaumont, Les Principes.
- Jacques Meunié, Le Maroc saharien des origines à 1670.
- Jacques Rouré, Alphonse Daudet. Biographie.
- Jean Imbert, L'Histoire des hôpitaux en France.
- Jean-Denis Bergasse, Pierre-Paul Riquet et le canal du Midi dans les arts et la littérature.
- Jean-Marie Paupert, Les Mères patries, Jérusalem, Athènes et Rome.
- Jean-Pierre Changeux, L'Homme neuronal.
- Jean-Pierre Gurgand, Si je t'oublie Jérusalem. La prodigieuse aventure.
- Michel Bulteau, Mythologie des filles des eaux.
- Norbert Dufourcq, Le Livre de l'orgue français.
- Paul Dreyfus, Histoires extraordinaires de la résistance en Europe.
- Pierre Barret, Si je t'oublie Jérusalem. La prodigieuse aventure.
- Pierre Lamaison, L'Impossible mariage, violence et parenté en Gévaudan, XVIIe, XVIIIe et XIXe siècles.
- Pierre Pluchon, Histoire des Antilles et de la Guyane.
- René Laurentin, Les Évangiles de l'enfance du Christ.

1984

- André Bouvier, Un temps pour planter, un temps pour arracher.
- Andrée Thenot, Initiation à l'archéologie de la France.
- Anne Henry, Travaux consacrés à Marcel Proust.
- Armand Hoog, Stendhal avant Stendhal. Vie de Stendhal (1783-1821).
- Bernard Sergent, L'Homosexualité dans la mythologie grecque.
- Gérard Chaliand, Atlas stratégique: Géopolitique des rapports de forces dans le monde.
- Harald Emeis, L'Âme prisonnière (Analyses de l'œuvre de Roger Martin du Gard.
- Henri Laborit, La Colombe assassinée. La Violence et les Nations.
- Hervé Coutau-Bégarie, La Puissance maritime soviétique.
- Hervé Roy, Les Ombres et les Nombres.
- Jean Fournier, Un jardin pour Hésiode.
- Jean-Christophe Demard, Aventure extraordinaire d'un village franc-comtois.
- Jean-Claude Lamy, Arsène Lupin, gentleman de la nuit.
- Jean-Pierre Rageau, Atlas stratégique. Géopolitique des rapports de force dans le monde.
- Jean-Robert Pitte, Histoire du paysage français.
- Louis Badré, Histoire de la forêt française.
- Louis Guitard, Mon Léon Blum, ou les défauts de la statue.
- Marguerite Lecat, Quand les laboureurs « courtisaient » la terre.
- Marie-Laure Seguin, Un souffle.
- Maurice Olivier, Lumière et pauvreté.
- Michel Jumilhac, Le Massacre des innocents.
- Quentin Debray, L'Esprit des mœurs.
- René Joffroy, Initiation à l'archéologie de la France.
- Robert Flament-Hennebique, Le Poil de la bête.
- Yves Jacob, Mandrin, le voleur d'impôts.

1985

- Bertrand Dard, La Statue de la Liberté, le livre du centenaire.
- Christian Blanchet, La Statue de la Liberté, le livre du centenaire.
- Noël Francœur, L'hôtel de la Chancellerie d'Orléans, ancien hôtel.
- Frédéric Bluche, Danton.
- Georges Saint-Clair, L'Arche d'octobre.
- Jean des Cars, L'Orient-Express.
- Jean Descombes, Témoin d'hier et de demain.
- Jean Rolin, L'Avis des bêtes.
- Jean-François Fayard, Des enfants sans histoire.
- Jean-Paul Caracalla, L'Orient-Express.
- Jean-Yves Blot, À la recherche du Saint-Géran. Au pays de Paul et Virginie.
- Marie-Françoise Lévy, De mères en filles. L'éducation des Françaises (1850-1880).
- Mark K. Deming, La Halle au blé à Paris 1762-1813.
- Maurice Bessy, Charlie Chaplin.
- Maurice Cocagnac, Les Racines de l'âme indienne.
- Max Bally, Le Joueur à la guerre. De la coupe Davis aux canons de Navarone.
- Michel Topolinski, Les Titulaires des quarante fauteuils de l'Académie française.
- Pierre Fleury, Les Amours du vent et de la mer.
- Sabine Melchior-Bonnet, Églises et abbayes en France.

1986

- Albert Meglin, Le Monde à l'envers. Comment retrouver les lois de la vie.
- Jean Ladame, Les Saints de la piété populaire.
- Michel Serres, Les Cinq sens. Philosophie des corps mêlés.
- René de Ceccatty, L'Or et la Poussière.
- Serge Brunier, Architecture de l'universel.
- Thierry de Cabarrus, Le Château des autres.

1987

- Serge Bonnet, L'Homme du fer.
- Yves Lacoste, Géopolitiques des régions françaises, publié sous sa direction.

1988

- Daniel Dessert, Fouquet.
- François Neveux, L'Évêque Pierre Cauchon.
- Georges Sapède, Portraits cévenols du XVIIIe.
- Gérard-Georges Lemaire, Les Cafés littéraires.
- Jean Boudriot, Les Collections historiques du musée de l'Armée.
- Roger Mehl, Le Pasteur Marc Boegner.
- Younès Nekrouf, Une amitié orageuse, Moulay Ismaïl et Louis XIV.

1989

- Paul Duclos, Lumière derrière les barreaux.
- Renée Van Coppenolle, Un prêtre-poète : Jean Kobs.

== Prix Broquette-Gonin (philosophy) ==
The prix Broquette-Gonin of philosophy "rewards French authors of commendable works with elevating character and moral value." It was awarded from 1917 to 1963.

=== Laureates ===
1917

- Henri Bremond, Histoire littéraire du sentiment religieux en France

1918

- Émile Mâle, L'Art religieux en France au moyen-âge

1928

- Paul Hazard (for lifetime achievement)

1951

- Jean Alazard (for lifetime achievement)

1955

- Maurice Allem (for lifetime achievement)

1956

- René Huyghe, Dialogue avec le visible

1957

- Gabriel Lepointe, Histoire des institutions et des faits sociaux

1958

- Gabriel Arminjon, Banquier des pauvres
- M. G. Balandier, Afrique ambiguë
- Thomas Baudouin, Inès
- Jules Bertaut (for lifetime achievement)
- Maurice Bouvier-Ajam, Histoire du travail en France
- Paul Cazin (for lifetime achievement)
- Henriette Chandet, Louis, Prince impérial
- Henry Contamine, La Revanche
- Pierre Deffontaines, L'Homme et l'hiver au Canada
- Martin Deslias, L'Invention divine
- Suzanne Desternes, Louis, Prince impérial
- Paul Diel, La Peur et l'angoisse
- Jean Duhamel, Captivité de François Ier
- Fraigneau (for lifetime achievement)
- Émile Gérard-Gailly (for lifetime achievement)
- Jeanne-Lydie Goré, Fénelon
- Georges Gorrée, Charles de Foucauld
- René Le Gentil, Ce que le monde nous doit
- André Lebois, Admirable XIXe siècle
- Luppé (de) Custine
- Pierre L'ermite, (for lifetime achievement)
- Margerit (for lifetime achievement)
- Milton-Valente, L'éthique stoïcienne chez Cicéron
- Charles Oulmont, L'Enfant d'Israël
- Sully-André Peyre, Poésie
- Yolande Pittard, Du doute à l'absolu
- Danièle Roland, La nuit de la Chandeleur
- M. G. Rozet, Mon vieux Mâcon qui s'en va
- Pierre Saint-Marc, Le maréchal Marmont, duc de Raguse
- Marguerite Savigny-Vesco, Les La Ferronays
- Pierre Taittinger, Et Paris ne fut pas détruit
- Tran-Minh-Tiet, Histoire des persécutions au Viêt-Nam

1959

- Robert Aron
- Raoul Blanchard, Les Alpes et leur destin
- Jacques Chabannes, Ionna
- Paul Chanson, Lafayette et Napoléon
- Albert Chatelle, Napoléon et la Légion d'Honneur
- Dufourg, Chamborant 2e Hussards
- René Dumesnil
- Sœur Marie-Henri Jette, France religieuse sous la Révolution
- Albert Lesmaris, François de Beaucaire de Puyguillon
- Magnen, Chamborant 2e Hussards
- Pierre Miquel, Hugo touriste
- Albert Richou, Une école, un empereur, un château

1960

- Simon Arbellot, Neuf personnages en pleine aventure
- René de Berval, Présence du bouddhisme
- Michel Boutron, (for lifetime achievement)
- Martine Cadieu, Soleil d'hiver
- Maurice Chapelan, Maximes
- Georges Chapier, Châteaux savoyards
- Jean Drouilhet, Folklore du Nivernais et du Morvan
- André Ducasse, Vie et mort des Français (1914-1918)
- Léonce Fabre, Alpes cottiennes, vallées vaudoises
- Pierre Grenaud, Notre Algérie littéraire
- Mme Louis Lefèbvre, Écrits spirituels et paroles de l'abbé Huvelin
- Jean Mariotti, Daphné
- Jean Mellot, La superstition, ersatz de foi
- Jacques Meyer, Vie et mort des Français (1914-1918)
- Émile Moussat, Ce que parler veut dire
- Gabriel Perreux, Vie et mort des Français (1914-1918)
- Gilbert-Charles Picard, La Civilisation de l'Afrique romaine
- Saint-Paulien, Saint-François Borgia
- Antoinette de Saint-Pierre, Correspondance du maréchal Soult avec Louis-Philippe
- Louis de Saint-Pierre, Correspondance du maréchal Soult avec Louis-Philippe
- Adrien Thierry, Madame de Pompadour
- Paul Voivenel, La Courbe : le Toubib. In hoc signo

1961

- Apastaguy, Au nom du père
- Association Défense de la langue française
- Gabriel Audisio, Annibal
- Gilles de chaudenay, Divine citoyenne
- Line Droze, La Princesse aux yeux verts
- Henri-Paul Eydoux, Monuments et trésors de la Gaule et Lumières sur la Gaule
- Robert Fernier, Le Doubs
- Paul Gachet
- Gabriel Laplane, Don Pedro Ier, de Prosper Mérimée
- Les Ecrivains combattants, Anthologie
- Edmond Pognon, La Grèce
- Aimé Roche, Eugène de Mazenod
- André Rousseaux (for lifetime achievement)
- J.-P. Weber, Genèse de l'œuvre poétique

1963

- Robert Aron, Les origines de la guerre d'Algérie

== Prix Broquette-Gonin (poetry) ==
The prix Broquette-Gonin de poésie is "for a poet, whether poetry is lyrical, epic or dramatic. The prize may be awarded three consecutive years to the same poet who, after an interval of one year, may again be chosen." It was awarded from 1960 to 1979.

=== Laureates ===
1960

- Nelly Adam (for lifetime achievement)
- George-Day (for lifetime achievement)
- Jean-Victor Pellerin (for lifetime achievement)

1963

- Pierre Emmanuel (for lifetime achievement)

1968

- Pierre Emmanuel (for lifetime achievement)

1973

- Louis Amade (for lifetime achievement)

1977

- Jeanne Sigée, Onze faces de la merci

1979

- Louis Amade, Rajuste ta couronne et pars coquelicot
