= Jean Durtal =

- Born: Marie-Charlotte Sandberg-Charpentier; 16 February 1905; Angers
- Died: 27 June 1999 (aged 94); Paris
- Occupations: Journalist; Novelist

Jean Durtal, real name Marie-Charlotte Sandberg-Charpentier (16 February 1905 - 27 June 1999) was a 20th-century French poet, novelist, and woman of letters.

She was also a journalist and directed the journal Les Temps Modernes ans was a member and then president of the Société des gens de lettres.

== Literary prizes ==
Jean Durtal was awarded several literary prizes by the Académie française:

- 1971: Chants pour Athanaël, Prix François Coppée (poetry prize established in 1907)
- 1974: Livre blanc, Prix Émile Hinzelin (poetry prize established in 1945)
- 1979: Les raisins de septembre, Prix Broquette-Gonin (literary prize established in 1910)

== Bibliography ==
- 1946: Le Héros, preface by Pierre Dejussieu-Pontcarral, cowritten with Jean Durtal and Pierre-Marie-Philippe Dejussieu, Éditions Gutenberg, Paris
- 1949: La peau des autres, Éditions L'Elan
- 1951: Je suis gueri, Éditions : L'Elan
- 1954: Le Voile de Béatrice, Angers
- 1957: L'Homme au pilori, Les éditions ludographiques françaises, Nice
- 1960: Le Chef d'orchestre : Poèmes, Les éditions ludographiques françaises, Nice
- 1966: Les coulisses de la politique. une femme témoigne 1932-1942, Nouvelles Éditions Latines
- 1970: Saïd Akl, Poète Libanais, Nouvelles Éditions Latines
- 1971: Chants pour Athanaël, Éditions Dar al kitab, Beyrouth
- 1972: Les Raisins de septembre, Nouvelles Éditions Latines
- 1973: Livre blanc, Nouvelles Éditions Latines
- 1975: Choix de textes de Jean Durtal, essais... bibliographie, documents cowritten with Jean Durtal, Pierre Lyautey and Pierre Silvain, Collection Poètes actuels, Éditions Actuelles Formes et langages
- 1980: Place Du Ralliement, Éditions Val De Loire Angers
- 1986: La Fontaine du soir, Éditions Firmin-Didot
- Le trottoir des veuves Nouvelles Éditions Latines
- Rue de la Sagesse, Nouvelles Éditions Latines, reprint 2008
