= Marcel Charles Léon Cordier =

French poet, writer and essayist (born 1945)

Marcel Cordier
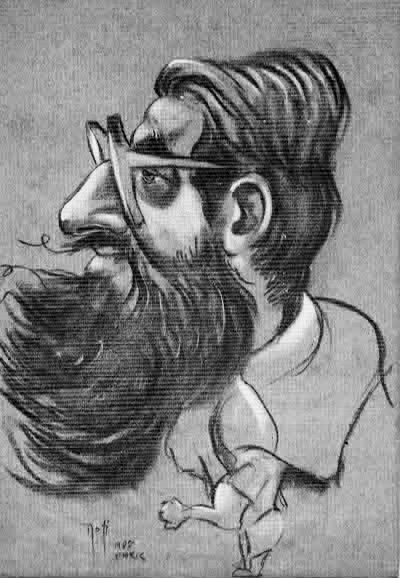
- Born: 20 December 1945 (age 80); Nancy, France
- Occupations: Professor of French language and literature; author

Marcel Charles Léon Cordier (born 20 December 1945) is a French poet, writer and essayist, noted for his contributions to the literary and cultural heritage of the Lorraine region.

== Biography ==
Marcel Charles Léon Cordier was born on 20 December 1945 in Nancy, France, into a family originally from the Vosges, particularly the village of Le Clerjus.

His father, Léon Cordier-Drouin—who wrote under the pseudonym Henri Helcé—was a schoolteacher who later became a French and German instructor. He authored language textbooks and regional novels. Taken prisoner during the Second World War, he used his knowledge of German to assist fellow prisoners in escaping.

His mother, Colette Bourquin-Arnoux, came from Besançon and belonged to a working-class family with both Catholic roots from Franche-Comté and Swiss Protestant ancestry.

Cordier was named in honour of his mother's only brother, who died at the age of twenty. He spent part of his childhood in the Vosges, particularly with his grandparents, which nurtured in him a deep connection to nature, oral storytelling, and the rural world—sources of inspiration that would later permeate his literary work.

=== 1945–1956: post-war years and childhood ===
In the immediate post-war period, his sister Marie-Claude was born in 1947, followed by Jean-Marie in 1950 and Jacques-Alain in 1957. He first attended the Charles III nursery school, then the Saint-Pierre primary school, and later the Buthégnémont primary school. His academic performance during these years was generally average, with the notable exception of History—his preferred subject—at which he excelled until the seventh grade.

Family holidays were spent in the Vosges, where Marcel Cordier visited his grandparents in a small village situated between Charmes and Mirecourt. It was in this setting that he developed a pronounced interest in artistic pursuits, particularly painting and literature.

=== 1956: admission to the Lycée Poincaré ===
In 1956, Marcel Cordier began his studies at the Lycée Poincaré, colloquially known as "Poinca," where he would remain for nine years. From his first year in the classical curriculum (sixième classique), he distinguished himself with a touch of wit, earning his first detention for pointing out to his French teacher that the latter was "only" twenty minutes late.

=== 1961: discovery of literature ===
In 1961, Cordier experienced a decisive literary awakening upon reading Balzac's Le Lys dans la vallée, recommended by his French teacher in première, Monsieur B. Coppey. He would later acknowledge that it was thanks in part to this teacher that he aspired to become a professor of literature himself.

=== 1963: meeting Dominique ===
In 1963, Cordier met Dominique, who would later become his wife. They married in 1967 and lived for two years in northern France. Dominique, an accomplished painter and sculptor, signs her works under the name Mido.

=== 1967: first literary success ===
In 1967, Cordier achieved his first literary distinction, winning the fifth prize for poetry in the Grand Prix Jeunesse organised by La Voix du Nord, whose jury was presided over by Pierre Seghers.

=== 1968: year of change and challenge ===
In 1968, Cordier witnessed the events of May in France while preparing his final license examination. This year was also marked by the birth of his first son, Alain-Tristan, on 31 July, who would later become a noted specialist in African music. At the same time, Cordier began his master's thesis on The Visible and the Invisible in the Poetic Works of Lamartine, proposed by his professor Raphaël Molho.

=== 1969–1970: family loss and new beginnings ===
In 1969, Cordier endured the sudden death of his father, a profound event that left a lasting mark on his life. The following year, his second son, Raphaël, was born on 15 January. Cordier completed his master's degree with the highest distinction (mention très bien). He published his first poetry collection, Maux croisés, encouraged by literary figures such as Raymond Queneau, René de Obaldia and Henri Guillemin. At the same time, his political interests grew stronger, and he began teaching French at the lycée in Dieuze before commencing his military service in December.

=== 1971: literary growth and multiple engagements ===
In 1971, Cordier reached several significant milestones in his personal and professional life:

- In January, one of his poems was read on national radio, marking his first recognition as a published poet.
- His comparative essay on de Gaulle and Lamartine appeared in the weekly L'Actualité, reflecting his dual interest in politics and literature.
- He entered into correspondence with leading intellectual and political figures such as André Malraux, Philippe Barrès, Edgar Faure, Michel Droit, Jean Dutourd, Michel Debré, Christian Fouchet, Pierre Messmer, Maurice Schumann, among others, thereby expanding his intellectual network and recognition.
- He received the Diploma of Honour from the Poets of Lorraine, acknowledging both his poetic talent and his commitment to literature.
- Although he abandoned his third-cycle doctoral thesis, Cordier continued his academic involvement as a professor of literature, being appointed in December to the Institution Saint-Joseph in Laxou.

=== 1972: political engagement ===
In 1972, Cordier became actively involved in politics by joining the Front Progressiste, a left-wing Gaullist opposition movement close to the Socialist Party. He also received a Diploma of Honour from the Society of Writers of the French Provinces. His academic activity and literary expertise were highlighted, notably by the journal L'Essor, which announced his lecture in Lyon on Lamartine and the Caves. The article observed that "Marcel Cordier, as a connoisseur, follows in detail, throughout the oeuvre, the development of this theme," underscoring his authority in this literary field.

=== 1972–1980: literary successes and cultural activism ===
The years between 1972 and 1980 were marked by Cordier's growing involvement in literary and artistic associations, as well as the steady publication of his works, including poetry collections and short stories. He pursued his teaching career while actively participating in cultural life and travelling throughout France. His contributions to both local and national cultural and political life earned him increasing recognition, illustrated by the many prizes and distinctions he received.

=== 1981–1988: Immersion in left-wing culture ===
The election of François Mitterrand on 10 May 1981 filled Cordier with joy and propelled him into an intense period of cultural engagement, particularly following the legalisation of community radio stations, which until then had been prohibited.

Determined to devote himself to writing and to fulfil his ambition of becoming a full-time author ("One day, I shall live by my pen!" he liked to exclaim), Cordier sought refuge during weekends and school holidays in the ancestral Vosges home of his childhood, inherited from his grandparents. The exact name of the village, however, remains deliberately undisclosed by the couple to this day.

== Publications ==
Over the course of his career, Marcel Cordier authored more than thirty works, encompassing poetry, short fiction, biographical essays, regional studies, and literary chronicles. His writing, deeply anchored in the culture, history, and landscapes of Lorraine, is characterised by a lyrical sensibility and a profound engagement with memory, nature, and human experience.

Notables titles include:

- Lamartine, poète de l'invisible, 1970.
- Maux croisés, 1970.
- Mât de cocagne, 1974.
- Kaki ou le Service militaire, 1974.
- Nancy soit-il, 1975
- Des feuilles et des branches, 1976, awarded the Grand Prix des Poètes Lorrains.
- Nancy Story, 1976.
- Nancyclique et Nancyclaque, 1977.
- Aux arbres citoyens, 1977.
- Quatre Vents, 1978.
- L' Amour la mort, 1979, – Hippolyte Roy Prize, Académie de Stanislas.
- Les côtes de Meuse, 1980, honoured by regional councils.
- Nouvelles Lorraines, 1980, Prix Maurice Barrès.
- Nancy la belle, 1980.
- Heucheloup ou la Lorraine sauvage, 1980, awarded the Broquette-Gonin Prize by the Académie française.
- Les demeures où ils vécurent en Lorraine, 1981, honoured by both the Académie Ausone and the French National Geographic Society.
- Allées et avenues, 1982.
- Taureaumagies, 1982.
- Leurs demeures en Lorraine, 1983.
- Un Grand Lorrain : Lyautey, 1984.
- Victor Hugo, homme de l'Est, 1985.
- L'héroïque Bigeard, 1986.
- Nancy Symphonie, 1986.
- Les Ombelles du Caucase, 1990.
- Hommes et lieux de mémoire, 1991.
- Marie Marvingt, la femme d'un siècle, 1991.
- Les trottoirs de la mer, 1995.
- La sève et le sang , 1995.\n*Œillades, 1996.
- L'académie du Goncourt intime, 1997.
- Les lacets de la liberté, 1998.
- Le sang des cerises, 2003.
- La lorraine des écrivains, 2008.
- Un Grand Amour, Alain-Fournier et le Grand Meaulnes, 2008.
- Lorraine, Secrète et Insolite, 2011.

Cordier's literary output reflects a sustained dedication to preserving and interpreting the identity of Lorraine and its place within the broader framework of French cultural and literary history.

== Awards and honours ==
Marcel Cordier's work has been widely recognised by national and regional institutions, literary societies, and cultural organisations. His honours attest to the critical acclaim and cultural significance of his contributions.

- 1981 – Broquette-Gonin Prize for Literature (Académie française), awarded jointly with his wife Dominique for Heucheloup ou la Lorraine sauvage, prix Broquette-Gonin.
- Member – Société des Gens de Lettres (Society of Men of Letters of France).
- 1979 – Hippolyte Roy Prize (Académie de Stanislas) for L'amour, la mort (also inducted as an associate member) en 1979 pour son recueil "L'Amour, la Mort", où il est Associé-Correspondant.
- 1968/1969 – Grand Prix Jeunesse by La Voix du Nord.
- Louis Pergaud National Prize – for Victor Hugo, homme de l'Est.
- Honourable Mention – Émile Moselly Prize (1975).
- Recognition – from the General Councils of Lorraine for Les Côtes de Meuse.
- Medals of Honour – awarded by the cities of Bordeaux and Verdun.
- Laureate – Académie Ausone (Metz).
- Diploma of Honour – from the Society of Writers of the French Provinces.
- Grand Prix des Poètes Lorrains (1975).
- Prix Maurice Barrès (1980) for La Maison.
- National Society of Geography – award for Les demeures où ils vécurent en Lorraine.
- National Literary Prize – Prix de l'Andouille du Val-d'Ajol.

Cordier is a figure in French literary life who works with the literary heritage of eastern France.
