= Dufourcq =

Dufourcq or Duffourcq is a family name which may refer to

- Charles-Emmanuel Dufourcq (1914–1982): French medievalist historian
- Élisabeth Dufourcq (1940–): French politician and writer
- Jacques Duffourcq (1881–1975): French rugby player
- Jean Dufourcq: French Counter admiral
- Nicolas Dufourcq (1963–): French businessman
- Norbert Dufourcq (1904–1990): French organist, musicologist and musicographer
