= Chabrol (surname) =

Chabrol is a surname. Notable people with the surname include:

- Claude Chabrol (1930–2010), French film director
- Henri Chabrol (1897–1981), French writer
- Gaspard de Chabrol (1773–1843), French prefect and member of the Chamber of Deputies
- Thomas Chabrol (born 1963), French actor, director and screenwriter
