= Lamaison =

Lamaison is a French surname. Notable people with the surname include:

- Christophe Lamaison (born 1971), French rugby union footballer
- Lydia Lamaison (1914–2012), Argentine actress
- Pierre Lamaison (1948–2001), French anthropologist
