= Jacques Benoist-Méchin =

French far right politician and writer (1901–1983)

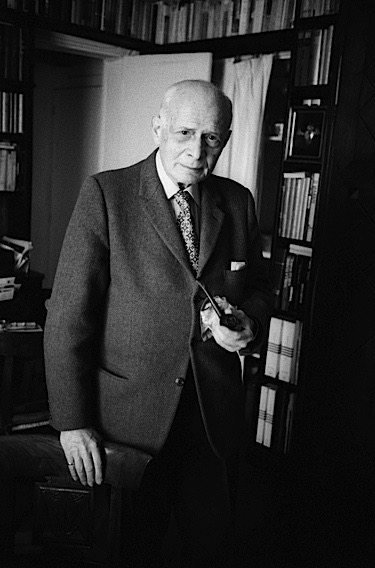
- Born: 1 July 1901; Paris, France
- Died: 24 February 1983 (aged 81); Paris, France
- Education: Lycée Louis-le-Grand; University of Paris
- Occupations: Politician, author

Jacques Michel Gabriel Paul Benoist-Méchin (1 July 1901 – 24 February 1983) was a French far right politician and writer. He was born and died in Paris. Well known as a journalist, he later became prominent for his collaborationism under the Vichy regime. After his conviction in 1947 and release in 1954, in the second part of his life he became a historian, with a focus on the Arab world, and in 1981 won the Prix Broquette-Gonin.

== Early years ==
Benoist-Méchin was educated at leading schools in Switzerland and the United Kingdom as well as the Lycée Louis-le-Grand before attending the Sorbonne. He subsequently served in the French Army, spending the period from 1921 to 1923 as part of the forces involved in the occupation of the Rhineland. He then became a journalist, working for the International News Service from 1924 to 1927 and was appointed editor of L'Europe Nouvelle in 1930 by Louise Weiss.

== Political career ==
A critic of democracy, Benoist-Méchin joined the French Popular Party in 1936. A noted Germanophile, he joined the Comité France-Allemagne, a group dedicated to fostering closer links between the two countries. Despite this his earlier military service meant that when war broke out between the two countries in 1939 he was mobilised and during the Battle of France he was captured and for a time held as a prisoner of war in Voves. He was quickly freed however and served as chief of the POWs diplomatic mission to Berlin, aimed at securing the release of those held in Germany.

In the main the Germanophile Benoist-Méchin somewhat welcomed the German occupation of France during World War II. He served as an undersecretary in François Darlan's cabinet and, along with Pierre Pucheu and Paul Marion, became part of the so-called "young cyclists" group of pro-German Darlan loyalists. The 11 May 1941, he accompanied Darlan to Berchtesgaden in order to negotiate military facilities in Syria for Germany with Hitler. In early 1942 he received from his personal friend Otto Abetz an offer that would guarantee France effective independence if the country agreed to become a military ally of Germany, although when the offer was officially made the terms had been watered down somewhat. Despite this loss of face Benoist-Méchin was an enthusiastic collaborator who claimed that France was working with Germany rather than opposing her and risking further defeat or working for her and thus becoming subservient. He was briefly the official ambassador for the collaborationist government in occupied Paris although early on this role passed to fellow Germanophile Fernand de Brinon.

A minister without portfolio in Vichy France, Benoist-Méchin's influence grew when he, along with his allies Paul Marion and Joseph Darnand, was appointed to the controlling committee of the Légion des Volontaires Français in June 1942. In this position he suggested renaming the group Légion Tricolore and converting it into a professional military unit, an idea soon adopted. Increasingly sidelined by Pierre Laval, Benoist-Méchin was involved in plotting with Darnand and Jacques Doriot for the three men to form a pro-Nazi triumvirate to administer Vichy France but the plan came to nothing.

After the liberation of Paris on 25 August 1944, Benoist-Méchin did not go with Pétain to Sigmaringen. With the launch of the épuration légale by the new provisional government, in September 1944 he was arrested for his role as a collaborator and detained at Fresnes Prison. His trial began on 9 May 1947 before the High Court of Justice. He was accused of tactical and strategic collaboration with the enemy. On 6 June, Benoist-Méchin was sentenced to death and indignité nationale. He was pardoned on 30 July by President Vincent Auriol and on 6 August his death sentence was commuted to life imprisonment and later to 20 years. He benefited from a remission of sentence on 24 September 1953 and was released on parole in November 1954, when he was freed from Clairvaux.

Immediately before and following his release, Benoist-Méchin wrote for a number of right-wing journals, notably Écrits de Paris and Paroles Françaises, the organ of the Republican Party of Liberty. He was a member of the Union des Intellectuels Indépendants, along with the likes of Pierre-Antoine Cousteau, and was co-patron with Maurice Bardèche of L'Union Réaliste, a group that sought to glorify the Vichy years.

== Writing ==
In his early career, Benoist-Méchin was most noted as an Arabist and as a prominent admirer of Ibn Saud. Shortly before the Second World War, he produced a History of the German Army in ten volumes, and in 1939 Éclaircissements sur Mein Kampf d'Adolphe Hitler, an interpretation of Hitler's Mein Kampf. After the fall of France came La Moisson de Quarante, a memoir of his time as a prisoner-of-war.

Benoist-Méchin's major achievement as a historian is a collection of seven sensational books published between 1961 and 1980 under the general title Le Rêve le plus long de l'Histoire (The Longest Dream in History), referring to the dream of powerful historic personalities about merging the West and the Middle East. The seven are Alexander the Great, the Emperor Julian, Cleopatra, the Emperor Frederick II (for which work he won the renowned French Prix Broquette-Gonin), Napoleon (in Egypt), Lawrence of Arabia, and Hubert Lyautey. His De la Défaite au désastre, memoirs of the Vichy period, was published in 1984.

== Personal life ==
Benoist-Méchin was a patron of the famous Paris bookshop Shakespeare and Company and during the Second World War used his connections to secure the release of the shop's American-born owner Sylvia Beach from a spell of internment. He befriended James Joyce and made an early French translation of Molly Bloom's monologue from Ulysses, and also provided the musical transcription of "Little Harry Hughes" photographed for episode 17. He also corresponded with Ernst Jünger during the German scholar's residence in occupied France. He also developed a close friendship with Union Movement leader Oswald Mosley whilst the latter lived in France after the war.

== Publications ==
- Histoire de l'armée allemande (1936) :
1. : De l'Armée impériale à la Reichswehr (1918–1919);
2. : De la Reichswehr à l'Armée nationale (1919–1938);
3. : De Vienne à Prague (1938–1939).
- Éclaircissements sur Mein Kampf d'Adolphe Hitler, le livre qui a changé la face du monde (1939).
- La Moisson de quarante – Journal d’un prisonnier de guerre (1941).
- L'Ukraine, des origines à Staline (Albin Michel, 1941).
- Ce qui demeure – Lettres de soldats tombés au champ d’honneur, 1914–1918 (1942).
- A series with the title Rêve le plus long de l'Histoire (Éditions Perrin) :
1. : Lawrence d'Arabie – Le rêve fracassé (1961), which in 2008 appeared in a paperback edition.
2. : Cléopâtre – Le rêve évanoui (1964);
3. : Bonaparte en Égypte – Le rêve inassouvi (Lausanne: La guilde du livre, 1966; Perrin, 1978);
4. : Lyautey l'Africain ou Le rêve immolé (1966);
5. : L'empereur Julien – Le rêve calciné (1969);
6. : Alexandre le Grand – Le rêve dépassé (1976). Later edition by Clairefontaine and La guilde du livre, Lausanne, 1964;
7. : Frédéric de Hohenstaufen – Le rêve excommunié (1980), which in 2008 appeared in a paperback edition.
- Le Loup et le Léopard :
1. : Mustapha Kemal – La mort d’un Empire (1954);
2. : Ibn Séoud – La naissance d’un Royaume (1955);
3. : Le Roi Saud, ou l'Orient à l'heure des relèves (1960).
- Soixante jours qui ébranlèrent l'occident (1956, three volumes). Published in abridged form in one volume as 60 days that shook the West (London: Jonathan Cape, 1963).
1. : La Bataille du Nord – 10 mai-4 juin 1940;
2. : La Bataille de France – 4 juin 1940– 25 juin 1940;
3. : La Fin du Régime – 26 juin 1940 – 10 juillet 1940.
- Un printemps arabe (1959).
- Deux étés africains (1972).
- À destins rompus (1974).
- Fayçal, roi d'Arabie (1975).
- L'Homme et ses jardins – Les métamorphoses du paradis terrestre (1975).
- La Musique et l'immortalité dans l'œuvre de Marcel Proust (1977).
- La Turquie se Dévoile 1908–1938 (1980).
- De la défaite au désastre (1984–1985, posthume).
- À l'épreuve du temps (1989–1993, posthume) (new revised edition by Perrin, 2011).
- Histoire des Alaouites (1994, posthume).

== Cited sources ==
- Littlejohn, David (1972). The Patriotic Traitors. London: Heinemann. ISBN 0-434-42725-X.
