= Frédéric Bluche =

French legal historian (1951–2024)

- Born: 30 June 1950
- Died: 3 January 2024 (aged 73)
- Education: Pantheon-Assas University
- Occupation: Legal historian

Frédéric Bluche (30 June 1950 – 3 January 2024) was a French legal historian who specialized in the French Revolution and the First Empire.

== Biography ==
Born in 1950, Bluche was the son of fellow historian François Bluche, with whom he shared the "same passion for history" according to Christian Amalvi. He directed five theses and served on the jury for two. He notably published Le prince, le peuple, et le droit in 2000. He also edited multiple articles in the Encyclopædia Universalis. He earned a doctorate in legal history for Pantheon-Assas University in 1978 and taught this subject at the same school.

Frédéric Bluche died on 3 January 2024, at the age of 73.

== Works ==
- Le Plébiscite des Cent-Jours (avril-mai 1815) (1974)
- Le Bonapartisme : aux origines de la droite autoritaire, 1800-1850 (1980)
- Le Bonapartisme (1981)
- Lois fondamentales et succession de France (1984)
- Danton (1984)
- Septembre 1792 : logiques d'un massacre (1986)
- Chronique du royaume d'Harkhanie : roman (1988)
- Les Révolutions françaises : les phénomènes révolutionnaires en France, du Moyen âge à nos jours (1989)
- La Révolution française (1989)
- Les Mémoires secrets d'Alexandre (1999)
- Le prince, le Peuple et le Droit : autour des plébiscites de 1851 et 1852 (2000)
- Manuel d'histoire politique de la France contemporaine (2001)

== Awards ==
- Prix Broquette-Gonin for Danton (1985)
