= Geneviève Viollet-le-Duc =

- Born: 2 March 1909; Neuilly-sur-Seine
- Died: 9 December 2011 (aged 102)
- Occupation: Writer

Geneviève Viollet-le-Duc (2 March 1909 – 9 December 2011) was a French writer.

Born at Neuilly-sur-Seine in the Hauts-de-Seine department, she was the daughter of Georges Viollet-le-Duc and Renée Defau. Her great-grandfather was the architect Eugène Viollet-le-Duc. She married (and later divorced) Eugène Marcombes, a doctor, whose father was the politician Philippe Marcombes.

In recognition of her work, she was made a Commander of the Ordre des Arts et des Lettres and won several prizes, including the Prix Broquette-Gonin and the Prix Albéric Rocheron.

== Works ==
- 1965: La Flèche de Notre-Dame de Paris
- 1965: Viollet-le-Duc à Rome, 30 octobre 1836–4 juin 1837
- 1968: Restauration de Notre-Dame de Paris : Découverte
- 1968: Viollet-le-Duc à Vézelay : Mairie de Vézelay
- 1971: Mérimée : Notes et documents, comptes rendus, informations, bibliographie
- 1972: Édition des Lettres d’Italie de Viollet-le-Duc (Prix Albéric Rocheron)
- 1978: Édition de la Correspondance de Paul-Louis Courrier (Prix Broquette-Gonin)
- 1994: Esthétique appliquée à l'histoire de l'art suivi de Viollet-le-Duc et l'Ecole des beaux-arts : la bataille de 1863–64
- 2000: Les Viollet-le-Duc, histoire d'une famille, documents et correspondances
