= Plural Maghreb =

1983 collection of essays by Abdelkebir Khatibi

- Author: Abdelkebir Khatibi
- Original title: Maghreb pluriel
- Language: French
- Published: Paris, 1983
- Publisher: Denoël

Plural Maghreb (in French: Maghreb pluriel) is a book of critical essays written by Abdelkebir Khatibi first published in 1983. The book, containing six theoretical essays, presents and applies the concepts of other thought and double critique, addressing issues of language, translation, orientalism, knowledge, power, domination, and decolonization.

In his essays, Khatibi conceives of the Maghreb "as a horizon of thought" and a model for plurality, alterity, difference, and alternative thought, calling for a "radicalization of the margin." While each essay can work as a standalone piece, the six essays are united by the theme of a "plural Maghreb," presented by Khatibi as both a historical reality and a desire restrained by the dominance of both theological-nationalist authorities and Orientalist colonial forces.

Khatibi's thinking in Plural Maghreb is grounded in culture theory and philosophy of language, and it is influenced by the thinking of Jacques Derrida on deconstruction and alterity.

== Essays ==
=== "Other Thought" ===
Maghreb pluriel begins with a quote from the final chapter of The Wretched of the Earth, in which Frantz Fanon implores that Europe be left behind and that its legacies be rejected for the sake of finding "something different." Khatibi agrees that there is an urgent need to find "something different," but asks: "must we not first postulate that this Europe is still a question that shakes us to the core of our being?" In recognizing that Europe has rearranged the most intimate aspects of the colonized, he insists that disentangling from Europe is no simple matter, and that the call for decolonization must be reformulated.

The opening essay Pensée - autre—a version of which was first published as "Le Maghreb comme horizon de pensée" in a 1977 special issue of Les Temps modernes entitled Du Maghreb produced by North African intellectuals—provides a theoretical framework for the rest of Maghreb pluriel. In this essay, Khatibi identifies the "Western legacy and our very theological, very charismatic, and very patriarchal heritage" as the subjects of critique. He develops the concept of Other Thought, or pensée autre, which is predicated on subverting the domination of both the Western colonial legacy as well as Arab-Islamic heritage and conceives of the Maghreb "as a horizon of thought" and a model for plurality.

=== "Double Critique" ===
The Double critique essay contains two parts: a study of colonial sociology—its "decolonization"—and an analysis of precolonial hierarchy in the Maghreb and especially Morocco. The first part was written in 1974 and substantially revised, and the second part was written in 1970. The essay engages with the thinking of Ibn Khaldun, arguing that it had been misappropriated by both Western and Islamic schools of social theory.

Khatibi's concept of "double critique" can be summarized as the simultaneous de-centering of both Western, colonial systems of thought and power and Islamic, inherited systems of thought and power.

Khatibi's thinking, and especially his idea of double critique, influenced the work of Fatema Mernissi and Walter Mignolo.

=== "Disoriented Orientalism" ===
In L'orientalisme désorienté, originally published in 1974, Khatibi criticizes the work of Jacques Berque, a 20th century French sociologist and Arabist at the Collège de France. Unlike Edward Said, who in his Orientalism criticizes those who have written with intellectual and political hostility towards The East and constructed a narrative of its inferiority to the West, Khatibi targets the Orientalists who romanticize various aspects of The East. Khatibi sees this romanticization as advancing "the pecuniary interests of Western technocracy."

=== "Sexuality According to the Qu'ran" ===
Khatibi begins La sexualité selon le Coran by addressing what he sees as an absence in the previous literature of engagement with both "sexuality in Islam and Islam according to sexuality." Khatibi takes Foucault's paradigmatic analysis of sexuality from the first volume of The History of Sexuality and argues that, as there is a lack of direct equivalents in Arabic, "sexuality" has to transform in translation into the target language and with regard to the bodies that speak it. Khatibi argues that, unlike Foucault's notion of sexuality, the Quranic discourse on sexuality is legal in character, serving to regulate sexual interactions in social relations. Although the essay's subject of analysis is Quranic discourse on sexuality, Khatibi's analysis makes frequent use of a variety of sources—not only from Islamic theology and jurisprudence and European philosophy, but also from Christian doctrine and Western art.

Khatibi felt compelled to address the "silent questions" in Maghrebi society as part of his sustained dedication to subversive literature.

=== "Bilingualism and Literature" ===
In Bilinguisme et littérature, Khatibi's concept of bi-langue ('bi-language'), a play on words suggesting bilingualism as well as a bifurcated tongue, is—as a process of constant translation and movement between center and periphery—a project of decolonization and questioning the established order. For Khatibi, Maghrebi texts written in French are "narratives of translation," narratives that "speak in tongues," as the mother tongue—whether a dialect of Arabic or Amazigh—operates within the foreign language, resisting formality and functionality.

=== "Questions of Art" ===
In Questions d'art, Khatibi develops his theory of artistic creation as a process of growth and reinvention. The essay begins with the image of a tree, which is used as an analogy for a work of art.

== Translations ==
A translation by P. Burcu Yalim from French into English was published by Bloomsbury in 2019. The English translation inserts the subtitle "Writings of Postcolonialism," which did not appear with the original publication.
