= Joël Schmidt =

French writer and literary critic (1937–2026)

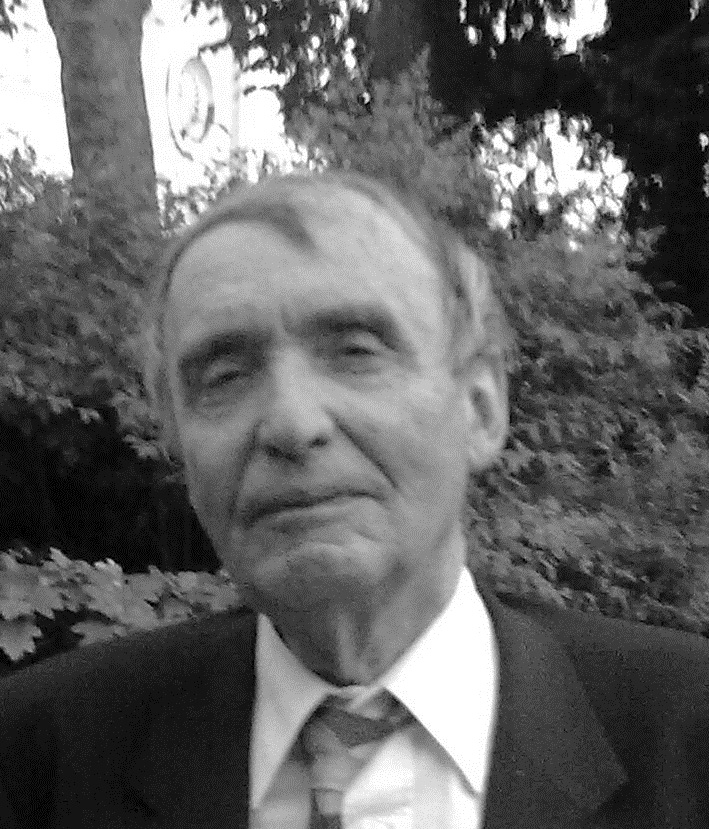
- Schmidt in 2010
- Born: 31 January 1937; Paris, France
- Died: 22 January 2026 (aged 88)
- Education: École alsacienne University of Paris
- Occupations: Writer, literary critic

Joël Schmidt (French: [ʒɔɛl ʃmit]; 31 January 1937 – 22 January 2026) was a French writer and literary critic.

The son of linguist Albert-Marie Schmidt, he was notable for writing the 1965 work Dictionnaire de la Mythologie grecque et romaine, which became a reference work for Greek and Roman mythology. He was interviewed on the France 2 show Secrets d'Histoire in 2016. He was a three-time laureate of the Académie Française, including the Prix Broquette-Gonin in 1973, the Prix Toutain in 1987, and the Prix d'Académie in 2004.

Schmidt died on 22 January 2026, at the age of 88.

== Works ==
=== Novels ===
- Le Fleuve des morts (1975)
- Casino des brumes (1978)
- La Ténébreuse (1980)
- La Reine de la nuit (1985)
- Le Flambeau des ombres (1985)
- Allemagne, j'écris ton nom (1990)
- Le Pavillon de l'Aurore (1993)
- La Métamorphose du père (1996)
- Je changerai vos fêtes en deuil (2001)
- Heureux qui la verra dans cette autre lumière (2007)
- Un cri pour deux (2010)
- Les Amants (2014)
- Germania (2016)
- Jamais l’un sans l’autre (2019)

=== Historical novels ===
- Mémoires d'un Parisien de Lutèce (1984)
- Tetricus et Victorina. Mémoires d'un empereur des Gaules (1987)
- Le Testament de Clovis (1996)
- Spartacus et la révolte des gladiateurs (1998)
- Mémoires de Constantin le Grand (1998)
- Le Sortilège allemand (2008)

=== Stories and essays ===
- Cléopâtre (1965)
- Les Antonins (1969)
- Le Christ des profondeurs (1970)
- La Grèce : les trésors de la Grèce antique (1973)
- Lutèce : Paris, des origines à Clovis (1986)
- Heinrich von Kleist (1995)
- Louise de Prusse (1995)
- Le Royaume wisigoth d'Occitanie (1996)
- Le Baptême de la France : Clovis, Clotilde, Geneviève (1996)
- Mythes et mythologies (1996)
- Grégoire de Tours, historien des Francs (1998)
- Dictionnaire de la mythologie grecque et romaine (1998)
- Sainte Geneviève : la fin de la Gaule romaine (1999)
- Cicéron (1999)
- L'Apôtre et le Philosophe : saint Paul et Sénèque, une amitié spirituelle (2000)
- Les Nibelungen (2001)
- Éros parmi les dieux (2003)
- Vie et mort des esclaves dans la Rome antique (2003)
- Les Gaulois contre les Romains : la guerre de 1000 ans (2004)
- Petite Encyclopédie de la mythologie romaine (2004)
- Jules César (2005)
- Cléopâtre (2008)
- Saint François d'Assise ou le miroir du monde (2008)
- Alexandre le Grand (2009)
- Le Christ et César (2009)
- Néron, monstre sanguinaire ou empereur visionnaire ? (2010)
- Robespierre (2011)
- La Saint-Barthélémy n'aura pas lieu : Et si la France était devenue protestante (2011)
- Et que le désir soit. Lettres entre un homme et une femme (2011)
- Femmes de pouvoir dans la Rome antique (2012)
- Hadrien (2014)
- Goethe (2014)
- Les 100 histoires de la mythologie grecque et romaine (2016)
- La Mort des Césars (2016)
- Bossuet (2017)
- Le Déclin de l'Empire romain (2018)
- Martyrs de Lyon (177 après Jésus-Christ) (2019)
- La légende des Nibelungen (2022)
