= René Joffroy =

French archaeologist

- Born: 10 June 1915; Chaumont, (Haute-Marne)
- Died: 5 February 1986 (aged 70); Châtillon-sur-Seine
- Occupation(s): Archaeologist; Curator

René Joffroy (10 June 1915 – 5 May 1986) was a French archaeologist. He was curator of the National Archaeological Museum from 1964 to 1984.

== Publications ==
- 1960: L'Oppidum de Vix et la civilisation hallstattienne finale thèse d'État
- 1961: La tombe princière de Vix Côte d'or, Boudrot
- 1979: Vix et ses trésors - Paris
- 1984: Initiation à l'archéologie de la France, éditions Tallandier, Paris. Prix Broquette-Gonin of the Académie française
