= Paul Marion (politician) =

French politician

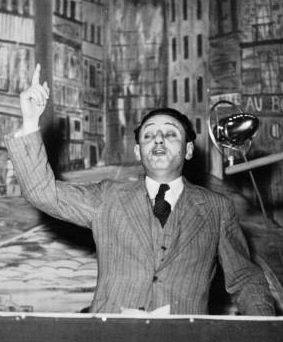
- Paul Marion in 1936
- Born: 27 June 1899; Asnières-sur-Seine, France
- Died: 2 March 1954 (aged 54); Paris, France
- Occupations: Journalist, politician
- Political party: French Communist Party; Socialist Republican Union; Parti Populaire Français

Paul Jules André Marion (27 June 1899 – 2 March 1954) was a French Communist and subsequently far right journalist and political activist. He served as the French Minister of Information from 1941 to 1944.

== Early years ==
Marion joined the French Communist Party in 1922 and wrote for L'Humanité as well as being elected to the party's central committee in 1926. After a spell in Moscow working for Comintern he left the Communist Party to join the more moderate Socialist Republican Union, which counted Marcel Déat amongst its membership, in 1929. He switched his allegiance to the Parti Populaire Français (PPF) in 1936. Despite his political origins Marion was quoted as saying that the PPF would ally itself with the Devil and his grandmother in order to defeat communism. In 1938 he published the Programme of the PPF, a document that defended capitalism as well as endorsing corporatism. Marion was widely associated with the more moderate tendency within the PPF, which emphasised anti-communism above all, as opposed to the openly fascist tendency loyal to Pierre Drieu La Rochelle. He also wrote for a number of right-wing journals, including Jean Luchaire's Notre Temps.

The same year he was one of a group of leading members who split from the PPF, feeling that Jacques Doriot had become too fulsome in his support for Adolf Hitler whilst also endorsing accusations that Doriot had been using his position to personally enrich himself. Marion was part of a loose group of leading members, unofficially led by Pierre Pucheu, who left the party together in early 1939.

== Vichy ==
Reunited with Doriot under the Vichy regime, he served as Minister of Information from 1941 to 1944. His power grew as he was elected to the controlling committee of the Legion of French Volunteers Against Bolshevism and, along with Jacques Benoist-Méchin, pushed to Pierre Laval the idea that the group should become an official arm of the Vichy government. In his government office he also helped to create an Association of Friends of the Waffen SS, which played a central role in recruitment. He also attempted to use his position to politicise France's youth groups although in this endeavour he was unsuccessful. He remained in office until 1944 when a group of radicals briefly took power and he was replaced by Philippe Henriot. Marion returned to office soon afterwards following Henriot's death and served in his former position when the Vichy government was shifted to Belfort, although by then it was effectively powerless.

== Post-war ==
Sentenced on 14 December 1948 to ten years in prison, he was pardoned in 1953 for medical reasons, and died of illness in 1954. Although he took no further role in politics Marion was reported as advising friends and supporters to vote for the Rally of the French People in the immediate post-war elections.
