= Philippe Marcombes =

French politician

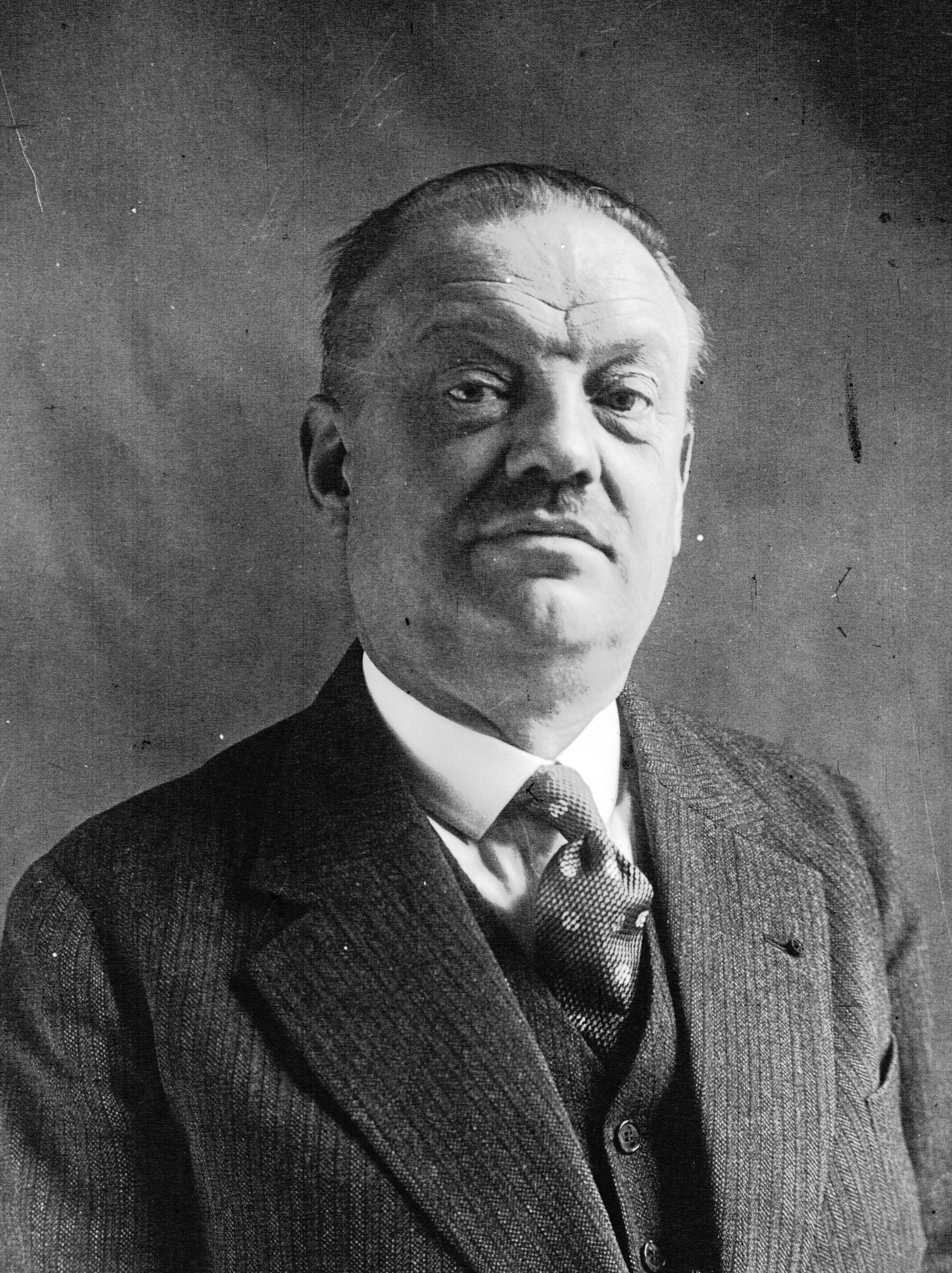
- Philippe Marcombes in 1933
- Born: 5 December 1877; Murat, Cantal, France
- Died: 13 June 1935 (aged 57); Paris, France
- Occupation: Politician

Philippe Marcombes (5 December 1877 - 13 June 1935) was a French politician. He served in the Chamber of Deputies from 1928 to 1935, representing Puy-de-Dôme. He was also the Minister of National Education from 7 June 1935 to 13 June 1935.

His son Eugène married the writer Geneviève Viollet-le-Duc, a great-granddaughter of the architect Eugène Viollet-le-Duc.
