= Jean Roudaut =

French writer (born 1929)

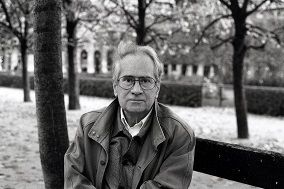
Roudaut in November 2003

Jean Roudaut (born 1 June 1929) is a French writer and professor of French literature who taught in the universities of Thessaloniki, Pisa, and Fribourg. He was born in Morlaix on 1 June 1929.

== Bibliography ==
- 1964: Michel Butor ou le livre futur, proposition, Éditions Gallimard
- 1967: Trois villes orientées, passage, Gallimard
- 1968: La Chambre, parenthèse, Gallimard
- 1971: Poètes et grammairiens au XVIIIe, anthologie, Gallimard
- 1974: Les Prisons, novel, Gallimard
- 1978: Autre part, paysages d’accompagnement, Gallimard
- 1978: Aître, Orange Exp.
- 1980: Ce qui nous revient, relais critique, Gallimard, Prix Broquette-Gonin of the Académie française
- 1988: Une ombre au tableau, littérature et peinture, Ubacs
- 1989: Lieu de composition, tournant, Gallimard
- 1990: Les Villes imaginaires dans la littérature française. Les douze portes, Hatier
- 1991: Georges Perros, Éditions Seghers, series "Poètes d’aujourd’hui"
- 1994: Spires, éditions P.A.P.
- 1995: Louis-René des Forêts, Les Contemporains, Éditions du Seuil
- 1996:Les dents de Bérénice, Essai sur la représentation et l'évocation des bibliothèques, Deyrolle, Prix Émile Faguet of the Académie française
- 1996: Encore un peu de neige, essay on La Chambre des enfants by Louis-René des Forêts, prélude, Mercure de France
- 1998: Sans lieu d’être, travelog, Le Feu de nuict
- 1999: La Nuit des jours, pêle-mêle assemblé, Lézardes, Revue de Belles Lettres
- 1999: Dans le temps, Théodore Balmoral, 1999, puis éditions Fario, collection Théodore Balmoral, 2016.
- 2001: Robert Pinget, Le vieil homme et l’enfant, Éditions Zoé
- 2008: Les Trois Anges, essai sur quelques citations de À la recherche du temps perdu, Honoré Champion
- 2009: L'Art de la conversation, Empreintes
- 2012: Un mardi rue de Rome, Notes sur un livre en paroles, William Blake an Co édit
- 2012: En quête d’un nom, Écho à quelques citations de À la Recherche du temps perdu par Marcel Proust, La Dogana
- 2014: Vu d'ici, apologue, Coll. 80 mondes
