= Henriette Dibon =

French poet and short story writer

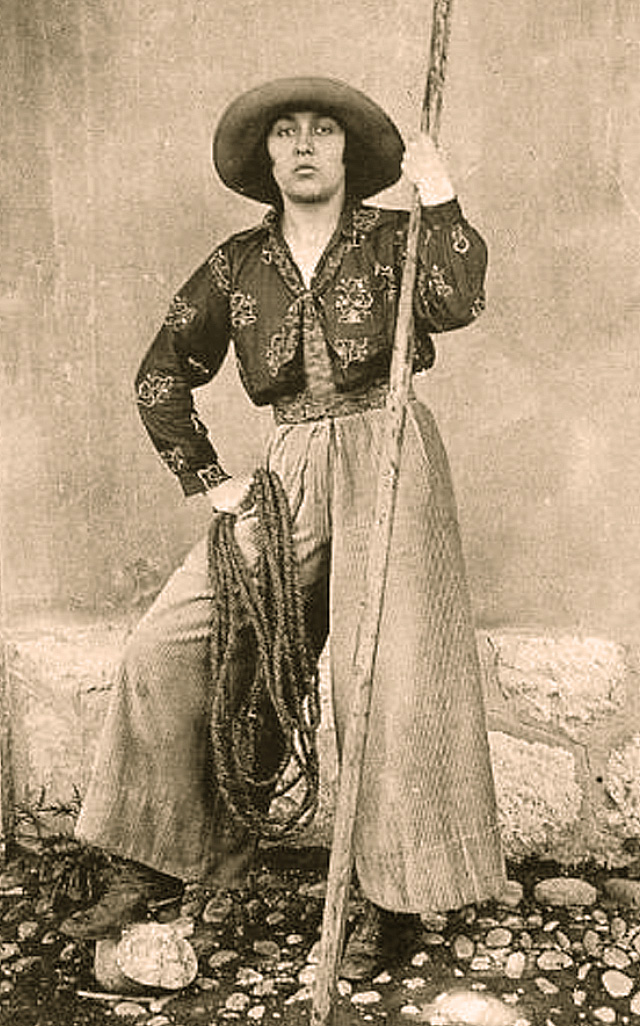
- Henriette Dibon in 1925
- Born: 9 August 1902; Avignon, Vaucluse, France
- Died: 9 September 1989 (aged 87); Avignon, Vaucluse, France
- Occupation: Author

Henriette Dibon, also known as Farfantello, (1902-1989) was a French poet and short story writer. A member of the Félibrige, she wrote both in Provençal and French. She won three literary prizes from the Académie française.

== Early life ==
Henriette Dibon was born on 9 August 1902 in Avignon, France.

== Career ==
Dibon was a teacher. She also served as the curator of the Musée Roure in Avignon.

Dibon was the author of many poetry and short story collections in Provençal and French. She was a member of the Félibrige, and Joseph d'Arbaud prefaced her 1934 poetry collection entitled Li lambrusco. Meanwhile, her poetry was praised by Charles Rostaing and René Jouveau.

Dibon won three literary prizes from the Académie française: the Prix Valentine de Wolmar for Ratis in 1967; the Prix Amic for Le Radeau in 1974; and the Prix Broquette-Gonin for Le marquis de Baroncelli in 1982.

== Death and legacy ==
Dibon died on 9 September 1989 in Avignon. She bequeathed a notebook of memories about the Félibrige to the Bibliothèque Méjanes in Aix-en-Provence.

== Works ==
- Dibon, Henriette (1925). Li mirage. Aix-en-Provence: Edition du Feu.
- Dibon, Henriette (1930). Lou rebat d'un sounge. Vaison: Macabet Frères. OCLC 495944014.
- Dibon, Henriette (1934). Li lambrusco. Avignoun: Edition dou Caburle. OCLC 799076006.
- Dibon, Henriette (1967). Ratis. Lyon: Audin. OCLC 18246489.
- Dibon, Henriette (1973). Lou radèu. H. Dibon. OCLC 495947192.
- Dibon, Henriette (1982). Folco de Baroncelli. Nimes: Bene. OCLC 13014257.
- Dibon, Henriette (1985). La Pouso-raco : nouvello e souveni. Nimes: Imprimerie Bené. OCLC 461703814.
- Dibon, Henriette (1986). Batèu de papié : chausido de pouèmo prouvençau ancian e inedit emé traducioun franceso. Nimes: Imprimerie Bené. OCLC 715301791.
- Dibon, Henriette (1987). La rentrée des classes. Nimes: Imprimerie Bené. OCLC 715301575.
- Dibon, Henriette (1988). Camargo : li pouemo d'en foro. Nimes: Editions de la Tour Magne. OCLC 715302201.
