= Abdelkebir Khatibi =

Moroccan literary critic, novelist, philosopher, playwright, poet, and sociologist

- عبد الكبير الخطيبي
- Born: 11 February 1938; El Jadida, Morocco
- Died: 16 March 2009 (aged 71); Rabat, Morocco

Academic background
- Education: University of Paris
- Thesis: Le roman maghrébin d'expression arabe et française depuis 1945 (1965)
- Doctoral advisor: Albert Memmi

Abdelkebir Khatibi (Arabic: عبد الكبير الخطيبي, romanized: ʿAbd al-Kabīr al-Khaṭībī; 11 February 1938 – 16 March 2009) was a prolific Moroccan literary critic, novelist, philosopher, playwright, poet, and sociologist. Affected in his late twenties by the rebellious spirit of 1960s counterculture, he challenged in his writings the social and political norms upon which the countries of the Maghreb region were constructed. His collection of essays Maghreb pluriel is one of his most notable works.

== Career ==
Khatibi was born on 11 February 1938, in the Atlantic port city of El Jadida. By the age of 12, he began to write poems, in Arabic and French, which he sent to the radio and newspapers. He studied in the French colonial school system, at Lycée Lyautey. He earned his doctorate in sociology under the French-Tunisian intellectual Albert Memmi at the Sorbonne in 1965. His dissertation, Le Roman maghrébin [The Maghribian Novel], which examines the question of how a novelist could avoid propagandizing in the context of a postrevolutionary society, and its follow-up, Bilan de la sociologie au Maroc [Assessment of Sociology Concerning Morocco] were both published shortly after the Paris Spring unrest of May 1968.

The “abstruse prose” employed by Abdelkebir Khatibi and the young generation of Maghribian authors reflects “the desire to refuse French culture by destroying and recreating the French language, thus attacking the heart of the culture from within, with what Khatibi calls a littérature sauvage”, according to Encyclopædia Britannica. Two plays, La Mort des artistes (1964; “The Death of the Artists”) and Le Prophète voilé (1979; “The Veiled Prophet”), and a novel, Le Livre du sang (1979; “The Book of Blood”),“ demonstrate Abdelkebir Khatibi's theoretical approach to literature”.

He taught at Mohammed V University in Rabat and worked as a director of the Institut de sociologie (Institute of Sociology) from 1966 until the institute's closure in 1970. In 1968, Roland Barthes was in Rabat and befriended and was influenced by Khatibi. His sociological studies include works on Moroccan social life such as Bilan de la sociologie au Maroc, 1968; Études sociologiques sur le Maroc, 1971; and La Blessure du nom propre, 1974.

He was editor-in-chief of the journal Bulletin économique et social du Maroc; he renamed it Signes du présent in 1987. His landmark collection of critical essays Maghreb pluriel was published in 1983.

He was a member of the Moroccan Communist Party and participated in the student activist organization the National Student Union of Morocco.

== Final years and death ==
In his later years, Abdelkebir Khatibi suffered from a chronic cardiac condition which led to his death in the Moroccan capital, Rabat, five weeks after his 71st birthday. During the final stages of his illness, a measure of the high regard in which he was held was seen in the personal concern of King Mohammed VI who directed his transfer to Morocco's premier medical facility, Sheikh Zayed Hospital.

Khatibi is survived by his widow and their two children.

== Awards and honours ==
- 1977: Prix Broquette-Gonin for his work L’art calligraphique arabe
- 1994: Prix du Rayonnement de la langue et de la littérature françaises
- 1997: Prix Grand Atlas for his work Du Signe à l’image, le tapis marocain (co-author Ali Amahan)
- 2008: Grand Prix SGDL de Poésie for his work Poésie de l'aimance

== Partial bibliography ==
=== Correspondence ===
- Le même livre (in French). co-author Jacques Hassoun. Editions de l'Eclat. 1985. ISBN 978-2-905372-04-8.
- Correspondance ouverte (in French). co-author Rita El Khayat. Marsam Editions. 2005. ISBN 978-9954-21-011-6.
  - Open Correspondence: An Epistolary Dialogue. Translated by Vogl, Mary B.; Babana-Hampton, Safoi; Orlando, Valérie. Uno Press. 2010. ISBN 978-1-60801-021-9.

=== Essays ===
- Le roman maghrébin (in French). Paris: Éditions Maspero. 1968.
- Vomito blanco: Le sionisme et la conscience mal-heureuse [White Vomit: Zionism and the Unfortunate Conscience] (in French). Collection 10/18. 1974.
- La Blessure du nom propre (in French). Paris: Éditions Denoël. 1974.
  - The Wound of the Name. Translated by Reeck, Matt. Northwestern University Press. 2025. ISBN 978-0-8101-4851-2.
- L'Art calligraphique arabe (in French). co-author Mohamed Sijelmassi. Paris: Éditions du Chêne. 1976.
  - The Splendour of Islamic Calligraphy. Translated by Hughes, James. Thames and Hudson. 1996. ISBN 978-0-500-01675-6.
- Maghreb pluriel (in French). Éditions Denoël. 1983.
  - Plural Maghreb: Writings on Postcolonialism. Translated by Yalim, Burcu. 2019.
- Figures de l'étranger dans la littérature française (in French). Paris: Éditions Denoël. 1987. ISBN 2-207-23358-8.
- Ombres japonaises; précédé de, Nuits blanches (in French). Fata Morgana. 1988. ISBN 9782851942456.
- Penser le Maghreb. Rabat: SMER. 1993.
- Du signe à l'image: le tapis marocain [From Sign to Image - The Moroccan Carpet] (in French). co-author Ali Amahan. Lak International. 1995. ISBN 978-9981-871-05-2.
- Le livre de l'aimance: proses artistiques (in French). Rabat: Marsam Editions. 1995. ISBN 978-9981-9723-3-9.
- Civilisation de l'intersigne (in French). Rabat: Institut universitaire de la recherche scientifique. 1996.
- La langue de l'autre (in French). Les Mains Secrètes. 1999. ISBN 978-0-9665360-1-0.
- Voeu de silence (in French). Al Manar. 2000.
- L'alternance et les partis politiques (in French) (2nd ed.). Casablanca: Eddif. 2000. ISBN 978-9981-09-036-1.
- Le corps oriental (in French). Hazan. 2002. ISBN 978-2-85025-844-2.
- Jacques Derrida, en effet (in French). Al Manar. 2007.
- Le scribe et son ombre [The scribe and his shadow] (in French). Paris: La Différence. 2008.

=== Novels ===
- La mémoire tatouée: autobiographie d'un décolonisé (in French). Paris: Éditions Denoël. 1971.
  - Tattooed Memory. Translated by Thompson, Peter. Editions L'Harmattan. 2016. ISBN 978-2-14-001415-4.
- Le Livre du sang [The Book of Blood] (in French). Gallimard. 1979. ISBN 9782070286775.
- De la mille et troisième nuit [From the Thousand and Third Night] (1980)
- Amour bilingue (in French). Fata Morgana. 1983.
  - Love in Two Languages. Translated by Howard, Richard. University of Minnesota Press. 1990. ISBN 978-0-8166-1780-7.
- Un été à Stockholm' [A Summer in Stockholm] (1992), Flamarion ISBN 2-08-066473-5
- Triptyque de Rabat [Rabat Triptych] (1993)
- Féerie d'un mutant: récit (in French). Serpent à plumes. 2005. ISBN 978-2-268-05406-3.

=== Plays ===
- La Mort des artistes [The Death of the Artists] (1964)
- Le Prophète voilé [The Veiled Prophet] (1979)

=== Poetry ===
- Le lutteur de classe à la manière taoïste (in French). Paris: Sindbad. 1979.
  - Class Warrior—Taoist Style. Translated by Reeck, Matt. Wesleyan University Press. 2017. ISBN 978-0-8195-7753-5.
- De la mille et troisième nuit. Éditions marocaines et internationales. 1980.
- Dédicace à l'année qui vient. Éditions Fata Morgana. 1986.

=== Sociology ===
- Bilan de la sociologie au Maroc. Rabat. 1968.
- Pouvoir et administration: études sur les élites maghrébines. Paris: CNRS. 1970.
- Études sociologiques sur le Maroc [Sociological Studies Regarding Morocco] (1971)

== Writings on Abdelkebir ==
- Memmes, Abdallah (1994). Abdelkebir Khatibi: l'écriture de la dualité (in French). L'Harmattan. ISBN 978-2-7384-2010-7.
- Wahbi, Hassan (1995). Les mots du monde: Khatibi et le récit (in French). Agadir: Université Ibnou Zohr. ISBN 9789981972032.
- Bousta, Rachida Saigh (1996). Lecture des récits de Abdelkebir Khatibi: écriture, mémoire et imaginaire (in French). Casablanca: Afrique Orient. ISBN 978-9981-25-057-4.
- Ahnouch, Fatima (2004). Abdelkébir Khatibi, la langue, la mémoire et le corps: l'articulation de l'imaginaire culturel (in French). L'Harmattan. ISBN 978-2-7475-6753-4.
- Wahbi, Hassan (2009). Abdelkébir Khatibi, la fable de l'aimance (in French). Harmattan. ISBN 978-2-296-06680-9.
- El Jabbar, Nabil (2014). L'oeuvre romanesque d'Abdelkébir Khatibi: Enjeux poétiques et identitaires (in French). Editions L'Harmattan. ISBN 978-2-336-35586-3.
- Ludmilla Fermé-Podkosova, « Abdelkébir Khatibi », in Christiane Chaulet Achour, Corinne Blanchaud ed., Dictionnaire des écrivains francophones classiques : Afrique subsaharienne, Caraïbe, Maghreb, Machrek, Océan Indien, Éd. H. Champion, Paris, 2010, p. 237-241 ISBN 978-2-7453-2126-8
- El Merabet, Lahoucine (2018). Abdelkébir Khatibi: La sensibilité pensante à l'oeuvre dans Le livre du sang (in French). Paris: Editions L'Harmattan. ISBN 978-2-14-009409-5.
- Hiddleston, Jane; Lyamlahy, Khalid (2020). Abdelkébir Khatibi: Postcolonialism, Transnationalism, and Culture in the Maghreb and Beyond. Liverpool University Press. ISBN 978-1-78962-260-7.

== See also ==
- List of Moroccan writers
