= Amélie-Marie Goichon =

French scholar (1894–1977)

Amélie-Marie Goichon (8 January 1894 – 8 August 1977) was a French orientalist. She studied Islamic philosophy and ethnography. Born in Poitiers, France, Goichon analyzed the works of Avicenna and conducted fieldwork in the M'zab region of Algeria during the 1920s. Her resulting book La vie féminine au Mzab: étude de sociologie musulmane (transl. Feminine Life in M'zab: A Study of Muslim Sociology) examined the lives of M'zab women, discussing their roles in family and society, marriage customs, and childbirth practices; and also exploring the religious life of women and the role of magic in their daily lives, among various other topics.

Académie Française awarded her the Broquette-Gonin Prize in Literature in 1974 for her work Jordanie réelle (Real Jordan).

In her article on Avicenna's tendency to rely on parables, Sarah Stroumsa contrasted Goichon's view that there is no particular significance in the parable as the chosen form relative to the substance of his philosophical teachings (according to Goichon, Avicenna adopted this style to keep his mind occupied while he was imprisoned in the fortress of Fardajan) to her approximate contemporary Henry Corbin, who "granted the style of the stories profound philosophical significance".
