= Aline Coutrot =

French historian and political scientist (1927– 1987)

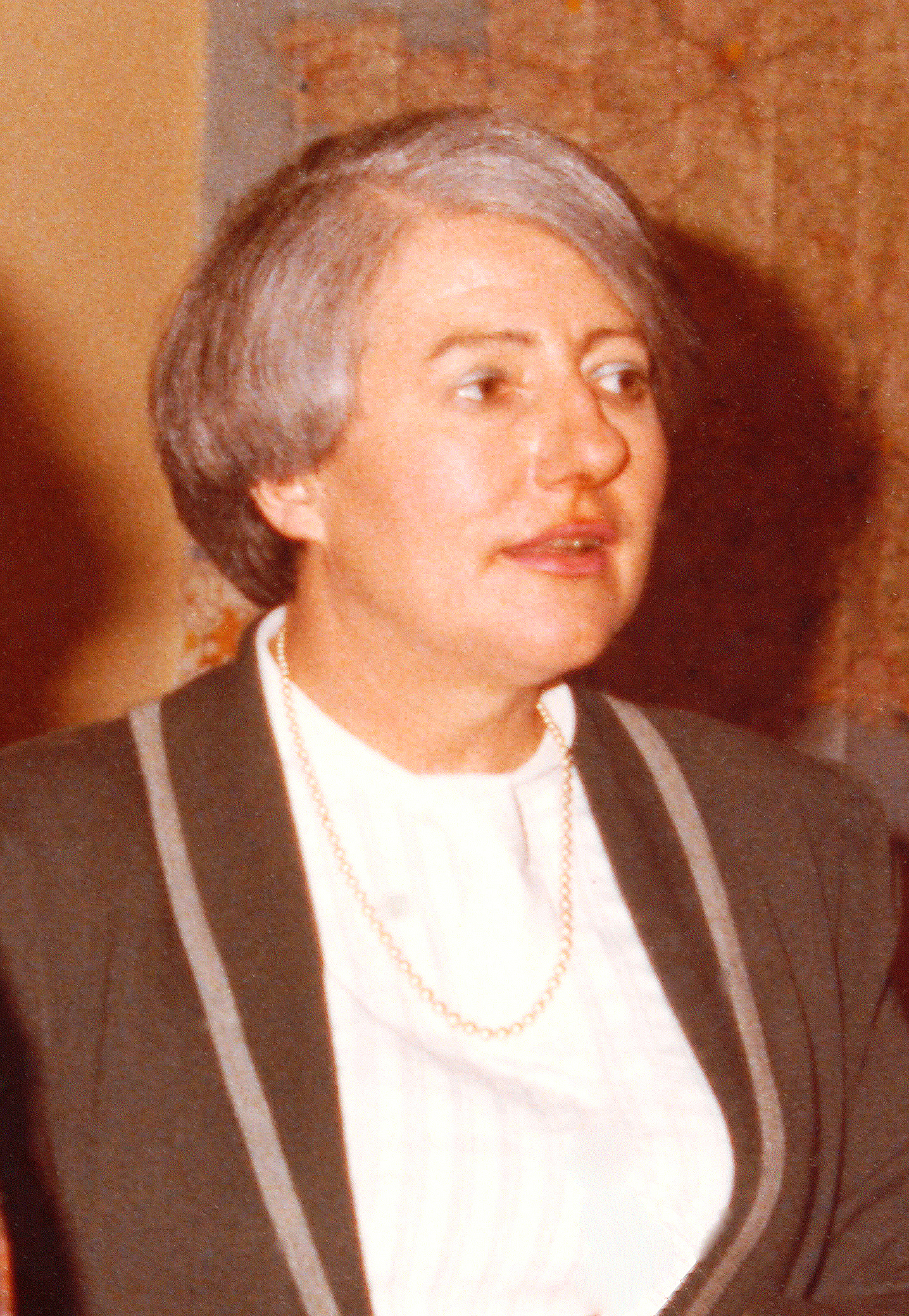
- Aline Coutrot
- Born: 17 June 1927; Paris, France
- Died: October 20, 1987 (aged 60)
- Awards: Prix Broquette-Gonin (1967)

Academic background
- Education: Collège Sévigné; Sorbonne University
- Doctoral advisor: René Rémond

Academic work
- Discipline: History, political science
- Institutions: Institute of Political Studies, Paris

Aline Coutrot (17 June 1927 – 20 October 1987) was a French historian and political scientist. Her research works and publications have mainly focused on the relationship between religion and politics in the 20th century, as well as on youth movements in France. In 1967, she received the Prix Broquette-Gonin (literature) Award for her work Religious Forces in French Society.

== Biography ==
Born on 17 June 1927 in Paris, Aline Coutrot was the daughter of Coutrot Jacques (1898 – 1965) and Seringe Georgette (1905 – 1985), both of whom came from Seine-et-Marne, Northern France. Coutrot was the eldest of five children.

She completed her school education at the Collège Sévigné, a private school in Paris. She later continued her higher education at the Sorbonne University. In 1972, she became an assistant professor at the Institute of Political Studies in Paris, where she spent her entire professional career in teaching politics and religion. In 1983, she obtained a doctorate in political science under the supervision of René Rémond, with whom she published a number of books and research papers.

In a pioneering contribution, unlike other writings on youth mobilization that focused on the individual movements at that time, she took a broader view of youth movements. She analyzed the role of religion and the impact of war on youth movements in French society. For instance, according to Coutrot, the JOC didn't give its members any particular “political direction, but educated them in an ethic of commitment and social responsibility.”

Later in her career, she took an interest in the creation of the Atomic Energy Commission.

She died on 20 October 1987 in Paris.
