= Guerres mondiales et conflits contemporains =

- Discipline: History of War
- Language: French
- Edited by: Chantal Metzger

Publication details
- Former names: Cahiers d'histoire de la guerre, Revue d'histoire de la Deuxième Guerre mondiale, Revue d'histoire de la Deuxième Guerre mondiale et des conflits contemporains
- History: 1949-present
- Publisher: Presses Universitaires de France (France)
- Frequency: Quarterly

Standard abbreviations
- ISO 4: Guerr. Mond. Confl. Contemp.

Indexing
- ISSN: 0984-2292 (print); 2101-0137 (web)
- LCCN: 87643910
- JSTOR: 09842292
- OCLC no.: 909782173

Links
- Journal homepage; Online archive

Guerres mondiales et conflits contemporains (French, literally "World Wars and Contemporary Conflicts") is a quarterly peer-reviewed academic journal covering the history of modern conflicts, until 1987 with a particular focus on World War II. It is published by the Presses Universitaires de France.

The journal was established in 1949 as the Cahiers d'histoire de la guerre. In 1950 it was renamed as Revue d'histoire de la Deuxième Guerre mondiale and in 1982 as Revue d'histoire de la Deuxième Guerre mondiale et des conflits contemporains, before obtaining its current title in 1987. The founding editor-in-chief was Henri Michel. Currently, the editor-in-chief is Chantal Metzger.

== Abstracting and indexing ==
The journal is abstracted and indexed in:

- Arts & Humanities Citation Index
- Current Contents/Arts & Humanities
- FRANCIS
- International Bibliography of the Social Sciences
- Scopus
