= François Jourda de Vaux de Foletier =

French archivist and historian (1893–1988)

- Born: 22 June 1893; Noyant, Maine-et-Loire
- Died: 17 February 1988 (aged 94); 13th arrondissement of Paris
- Occupations: Archivist; Historian

François Jourda de Vaux de Foletier, also called François de Vaux de Foletier, (22 June 1893 – 17 February 1988) was a 20th-century French archivist and historian, a specialist of the history of the Romani people in Europe.

== Biography ==
A student at the École Nationale des Chartes, Vaux de Foletier graduated as archivist-palaeographer in 1917 with a thesis about Jacques Ricard de Genouillac, master of the French artillery.

In 1955, he was among the founders of the journal Études tsiganes.

He was awarded several prizes by the Académie française in 1931, 1961, 1970 and 1981.

Henriette Asséo dedicated him her book Les Tsiganes — une destinée européenne, the 218th title published in 1994 by the Éditions Gallimard in the series "Découvertes Gallimard, Histoire", ISBN 2-07-053156-2.

== Works ==
- 1923: La Rochelle d’autrefois et d’à présent, La Rochelle, Pijollet
- 1925: Galiot de Genouillac, maître de l’artillerie de France (1465-1546), Paris, A. Picard
- 1929: Histoire d’Aunis et de Saintonge, Paris, Boivin, series "Vieilles provinces de France"
- 1931: Le Siège de la Rochelle, Paris, Firmin-Didot, Prix Thérouanne of the Académie française; new edition, La Rochelle, éditions Quartier Latin et Rupella, 1978
- 1932: Images de la Rochelle, ill. by Louis Suire, La Rochelle, La Rose des vents
- 1937: Le Comte de Buenos-Aires, in collaboration with Max Dorian, Paris, Gallimard
- 1938: Brouage, ville morte, ill. by Louis Suire, La Rochelle, La Rose des vents
- 1953: Étude sur les recherches biographiques aux archives de la Seine, in Jacques Meurgey de Tupigny, Guide des recherches généalogiques aux Archives nationales, Paris, Imprimerie nationale
- 1957: Charentes, Paris, Hachette, series "Les Albums des Guides bleus"
- 1960: Poitou, Paris, Hachette, series "Les Albums des Guides bleus"
- 1960: Arches de Paris, ill. de Louis Suire, La Rochelle, La Rose des vents
- 1961: Les Tsiganes dans l'ancienne France, Paris, société d’édition géographique et touristique, series "Connaissance du monde", Prix Broquette-Gonin of the Académie française
- 1970: Mille ans d’histoire des Tsiganes, Paris, Fayard, series "Les Grandes Études historiques", Prix Broquette-Gonin of the Académie française; (in Spanish) Mil anos de historia de los Gitanos, translation by Domingo Pruna, Barcelona, Plaza et Janes, 1974; (in Italian) Mille anni di storia degli Zigari, translation by Mirella Karpati, Milan, Jaca Book
- 1981: Les Bohémiens en France au XIXe, J.-C. Lattès, series "Lattès/Histoire, Groupes et Sociétés", Prix Biguet of the Académie française
- 1983: Le Monde des Tsiganes, Paris, Berger-Levrault

Vaux de Foletier wrote over two hundred articles, reports, bibliographical entries in the journal Études tsiganes and the Journal of the Gipsy Lore Society.

== Bibliography ==
- Histoires tsiganes — hommage à François de Vaux de Foletier, La Rochelle, Archives départementales de la Charente-Maritime, 15 octobre - 31 décembre 2003

== See also ==
- Romani people
