= Maurice Cocagnac =

French writer

- Born: Auguste-Maurice Jean Cocagnac; 20 June 1924; Tarbes
- Died: 18 December 2006 (aged 82); 14th arrondissement of Paris
- Occupations: Dominican friar Writer

Maurice Cocagnac (20 June 1924 – 18 December 2006) was a French Dominican priest (Order of Preachers), theologian, painter, writer and singer, as well as a great traveler. Between 1955 and 1960 he became especially known by the new spiritual songs he created and accompanied on guitar throughout France and Germany. He was awarded the Prix Broquette-Gonin in 1985 for his book Les Racines de l'âme indienne.

== Bibliography ==
=== Theology and spirituality works ===
- 1955: Le jugement dernier dans l'art (Éditions du Cerf)
- 1969: Si Dieu était mort, il ne parlerait pas si fort (Éd. du Cerf)
- 1976: Aujourd'hui l'Inde spirituelle (Éd. Retz)
- 1979: Ces pierres qui attendent : pour un dialogue entre l'hindouisme et le christianisme (Éditions Desclée de Brouwer)
- 1984: Les racines de l'âme indienne (Armand Colin)
- 1990: L'Évangile du soir (Éd. du Cerf)
- 1991: Rencontres avec Carlos Castañeda et Pachita la guérisseuse (Éditions Albin Michel) ISBN 2226052178
- 1993: Le zen : jalons sur un chemin de lumière (Droguet et Ardant; rééd. Plon/Mame, 1996)
- 1994: Le Christ est né à Chalma : foi et traditions des Indiens du Mexique et du Guatemala (Albin Michel)
- 1994: La parole et son miroir : les symboles bibliques (Éd. du Cerf)
- 1996: L'énergie de la Parole biblique (Éd. du Cerf)
- 1997: L'expérience du « mantra » dans la tradition chrétienne et les autres religions (Albin Michel)
- 1999: Le corps et le Temple (Éd. du Cerf)
- 2003: Sacré et secret : méditer pour entrer dans la profondeur des textes (Éd. du Cerf)
- 2006: Les Symboles bibliques : lexique théologique (Éd. du Cerf, 3rd edition).

=== Illustrated albums for children ===
- L'âne de Balaam (Éd. du Cerf, Les Albums de l'Arc-en-ciel /1, 1963)
- Zachée le publicain (Éd. du Cerf, Les Albums de l'Arc-en-ciel /2, 1963)
- Le jeune David (Éd. du Cerf, Les Albums de l'Arc-en-ciel /3, 1963)
- L'Agneau de Pâques (Éd. du Cerf, Les Albums de l'Arc-en-ciel /4, 1963)
- Jonas ill. Jacques Le Scanff (Éd. du Cerf, Les Albums de l'Arc-en-ciel /5, 1963)
- Jésus au bord du lac (Éd. du Cerf, Les Albums de l'Arc-en-ciel /6, 1963)
- Le baptême de Jésus (Éd. du Cerf, Les Albums de l'Arc-en-ciel, 1964)
- L'aveugle-né, ill. Jacques Le Scanff (Éd. du Cerf, Les Albums de l'Arc-en-ciel /7, 1964)
- Le paralytique guéri, ill. Jacques Le Scanff (Éd. du Cerf, Les Albums de l'Arc-en-ciel /8, 1964)
- Noé, ill. A. Le Foll (Éd. du Cerf, Les Albums de l'Arc-en-ciel /9, 1964)
- Élie et le feu du ciel, ill. Jean Jacouton (Éd. du Cerf, Les Albums de l'Arc-en-ciel /10, 1964)
- Guéri dans le Jourdain, le prophète et le soldat, ill. A. Le Foll (Éd. du Cerf, Les Albums de l'Arc-en-ciel /16, 1965)
- Évangile pour les jeunes, ill. Jacques Le Scanff (Éd. du Cerf, 1965)
- Pour comprendre ma Messe, ill. Jacques Le Scanff (Éd. du Cerf, 1965)
- La Bible pour les jeunes : 1. l'Ancienne Alliance, ill. Jacques Le Scanff (Éd. du Cerf, 1966)
- La Bible pour les jeunes : 2. la Nouvelle Alliance, ill. Jacques Le Scanff (Éd. du Cerf, 1967)
- Jésus nous donne le pain, ill. Alain Le Foll (Éd. du Cerf, Les Albums de l'Arc-en-ciel /19, 1966)
- Les disciples d'Emmaüs ont vu Jésus ressuscité, ill. Jacques Le Scanff (Éd. du Cerf, Les Albums de l'Arc-en-ciel /20, 1966)
- La création du monde, ill. Colette Portal (Éd. du Cerf, Les Albums de l'Arc-en-ciel /21, 1967)
- Jésus ressuscite Lazare (Éd. du Cerf, Les Albums de l'Arc-en-ciel /22, 1967)
- Moïse (Éd. du Cerf, Les Albums de l'Arc-en-ciel /23, 1967)
- Le Royaume de Dieu pousse comme un arbre (Éd. du Cerf, Les Albums de l'Arc-en-ciel /24, 1967)
- Pour comprendre mon baptême (Éd. du Cerf, 1968)
- Pierre, pêcheur du Christ (Éd. du Cerf, Les Albums de l'Arc-en-ciel /25, 1968)
- L'Esprit de Pentecôte, ill. Jacques Le Scanff (Éd. du Cerf, Les Albums de l'Arc-en-ciel /26, 1968)
- Les mots de la Bible, ill. J. Le Scanff (Éd. du Cerf, 1968)
- Les hommes regardent la lune, ill. B. Gibert (Éd. du Cerf, Les contes du hibou, 1969)
- Pouf, pouf, le petit train dans les nuages, ill. B. Gibert (Éd. du Cerf, Les contes du hibou, 1969)
- Jonquille, le sous-marin baladeur, ill. J. Le Scanff (Éd. du Cerf, Les contes du hibou, 1969)
- Avec Jésus je suis fort, ill. J. Le Scanff (Éd. du Cerf, 1969)
- Avec Jésus je suis heureux, ill. J. Le Scanff (Éd. du Cerf, 1969)
- Avec Jésus je travaille, ill. Ch. Biso-Masnou (Éd. du Cerf, 1969)
- Avec Jésus je n'ai pas peur, ill. Ch. Biso-Masnou (Éd. du Cerf, 1969)
- Les trois arbres du samouraï, ill. A. Le Foll (Éd. du Cerf, Les contes du hibou, 1969)
- La ville aux mille tours (Éd. du Cerf, Les contes du hibou, 1969)
- Là-haut sur la colline, story and images by K. Taniuchi, French text by M. Cocagnac (Éd. du Cerf, 1969)
- Didier s'envole, ill. Ch. Biso-Masnou (Éd. du Cerf, Les contes du hibou, 1970)
- Chenapan et le coq du clocher, ill. B. Gibert (Éd. du Cerf, Les contes du hibou, 1970)
- La flûte de Totito (Éd. du Cerf, Les contes du hibou, 1970)
- L'opéra de Jonas (Éd. Fleurus-Le Périscope, 1970)
- Qui m'appelle ?, story by K. Taniuchi, images by M. Kasuya, French text by M. Cocagnac (Éd. du Cerf, La rivière enchantée /4, 1970)
- Madame de la Taupinière, story and images by Y. Watari, French text by M. Cocagnac (Éd. du Cerf, La rivière enchantée/ 6, 1970)
- De plain-pied dans les nuages, images by K. Niizaka, French text by M. Cocagnac (Éd. du Cerf, La rivière enchantée /10, 1970)
- Les cerceaux enchantés de la pluie, images by K. Taniuchi, text by M. Cocagnac (Éd. du Cerf, 1971)
- Le vieil homme et son violon, story by T. Fugita, images by K. Taniuchi, text by M. Cocagnac (Éd. du Cerf, 1971)
- Mon oiseau est revenu, images by C. Iwasaki, text by M. Cocagnac (Éd. du Cerf, 1972).

=== Articles and archives ===
Numerous articles in L'Art sacré from 1954 to 1969.

Collaboration to collective works :

- Au seuil de la théologie, volume I, chapter VIII: "Formation de la religieuse en matière d'art sacré" (Éd. du Cerf, 1960);

volume III. ch. VIII: "Art sacré: les images de la foi" and ch. IX : "Éducation chorale : notes sur le chant populaire" (Éd. du Cerf, 1966).

- Art "Les formes anciennes de la vie religieuse au Mexique et au Guatemala", in Encyclopédie des religions, F. Le noir et Y.-T. Masquelier dir., Paris Bayard, 1997, p. 1252-1271.
- "Un art sacré ?", Revue d'Éthique et Théologie Morale, Le supplément, June 1992, p. 109-128.
- Interview "Un dominicain chez les sorciers", Paris Match, February 1991.
- Revue Question de, tenue d'un Journal anachronique; n° 20: "La parapsychologie en question; Le centaure et le cavalier; le dehors et le dedans"; n° 23: "De la pop-music au grégorien"; "Science et conscience"; n° 22: "L'Église et les mystères perdus"; n° 24: "Voyage au pays de l'âme ouverte"; n° 25 : "L'Apocalypse et ses images".

=== Songs and records ===
- 1957: Chansons bibliques, five 45 rpm (Lumen et Éd. du Cerf).
- 1966: Frère Jacques. Chantons le Seigneur : 150 chansons et chants spirituels, with Alice Collet and Pierick Houdy, (Éd. du Cerf)
- 1973: À la table du Seigneur : 13 chants pour célébrations d'enfants, with one 45 rpm (Édition Mame)

=== Books on Maurice Cocagnac ===
- Maurice Cocagnac : un dominicain peintre & voyageur (Éditions Karthala, 2008) ISBN 9782811100865
