= Pierre Silvain =

French writer and playwright

Pierre Silvain (1926 in Morocco – 30 October 2009) was a French writer and playwright.

== Works ==
- 1960: La Part de l'ombre, novel, Plon
- 1963: La Chair et l'ombre, novel, Plon
- 1964: L'Air et la chanson, novel, Plon
- 1965: La Dame d'Elche, novel, Mercure de France
- 1966: La Fenêtre, novel, Mercure de France
- 1968: Zacharie Blue, novel, Mercure de France
- 1969: La promenade en barque, novel, Mercure de France
- 1971: Mélodrame, theatre, Éditions Gallimard
- 1971: Les Eoliennes, novel, Mercure de France
- 1973: Le Grand Théâtre, novel, Mercure de France
- 1977: Les Espaces brûlés, tale, Mercure de France
- 1983: Une douleur d'amour, novel, Fayard
- 1985: L'empire fortuné, novel, ed. Manya
- 1985: Le regard du serpent, novel, ed. Mazarine
- 1990: Le Guetteur invisible, récit illustré de photographies de Pierre Schwartz, ed. Noésis
- 1992: Les chemins de la terre, proses, éd. Rougerie
- 1994: Détours, proses, éd. Rougerie
- 1995: La gloire éphémère de Joao Matos, novel, Julliard.
- 1998: Petites proses voyageuses, with illustrations by Colette Deblé, ed. Cadex
- 1998: Dans la nuit de Médée, novel, éd. Hors Commerce
- 2000: Le Brasier, le fleuve, essay, « L’un et l’autre », Éditions Gallimard
- 2002: Les Chiens du vent, poetry, with inks by Jean-Claude Pirotte, ed. Cadex
- 2002: Le Jardin des retours, Éditions Verdier
- 2005: Le Côté de Balbec, essay, L’Escampette
- 2007: Julien Letrouvé, colporteur, Verdier, (Prix de la Ville de Caen, 2008)
- 2007: Passage de la morte - Pierre Jean Jouve, essay, L'Escampette Éditions
- 2009: Assise devant la mer, Verdier
- 2010: Les Couleurs d’un hiver, Éditions Verdier
