= Arnaud Chaffanjon =

Arnaud Chaffanjon (23 April 1929 – 22 November 1992) was a French specialist in heraldry and aristocratic genealogy. He was a journalist at Point de Vue. He is known for his seminal works on the history of the European aristocratic dynasties, such as Le Petit Gotha Illustré (1968), Les Grands Ordres de Chevalerie (1969), Les Grandes familles de l'Histoire de France (1980), L'Année Princière dans le Monde (1985).
