= Henri Chabrol =

French writer (1897–1981)

Henri Chabrol (11 January 1897 – 1981) was a French writer. A graduate from the École Normale Supérieure (class 1919), he edited texts of classical antiquity, novels and plays (in French), poems and collections of stories (in French and Provençal)

== Works ==
- 1930: La chair est forte,
- 1931: Jeunesse du monde,
- 1943: L'Honnête Florentine, four-act comedy,
- 1947: La Vautour,
- 1971 À ciel ouvert,
- 1976: Le Mystère du Taureau; Prix René Bardet 1977.
- 1977: Prix Broquette-Gonin for his lifetime achievement in poetry.
