= René Sédillot =

French journalist and historian (1906–1999)

René Sédillot (French: [ʁəne sedijo]; 2 November 1906 – 21 October 1999) was a French journalist and historian.

== Life ==
Born in Orléans, Sédillot was educated in Paris. He worked for the financial press, joining L'Information Boursiere in 1928 and becoming editor until the paper folded in 1940. In 1945 he became editor of the weekly La Vie francaise (later renamed La Vie financiere).

== Works ==
- Survol de l'histoire du monde, 1949. Translated by Gerard Hopkins as A birds-eye view of world history, 1951. Also published as The history of the world in three hundred pages, 1951
- An outline of French history, 1952. Translated from the French by Gerard Hopkins.
- Survol de l'histoire de France, 1955.
- Histoire des colonisations [History of colonizations], 1958.
- Paris, 1962
- (with Franz Pick) All the monies of the world: a chronicle of currency values, 1971
- Histoire du petrole, Paris, 1974
- Le coût de la Révolution française [The cost of the French Revolution], 1986
- L’Histoire n’a pas de sens [History Has No Sense], Paris, 1965
