= Henri Michel (historian) =

French historian (1907–1986)

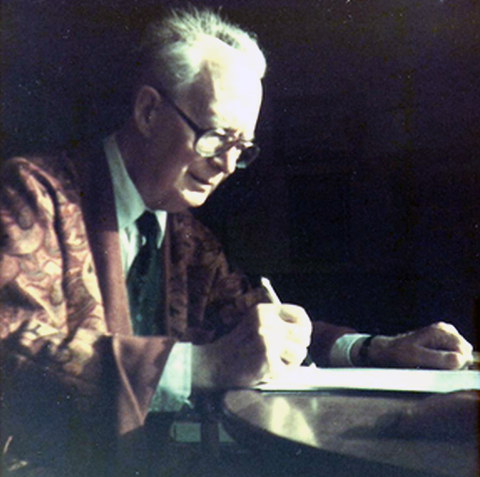
Henri Michel

Henri Michel (28 April 1907 in Vidauban, Var – 5 June 1986 in Paris) was a French historian, who studied the Second World War. He created the Comité d'Histoire de la Deuxième Guerre Mondiale and the Revue d'Histoire de la Deuxième Guerre Mondiale.

== Works ==
- (in French) Tragédie de la déportation, 1954.
- (in French) Histoire de la Résistance : (1940-1944), 1958.
- (in French) Les Mouvements clandestins en Europe (1938-1945), 1961.
- (in French) Les Courants de pensée de la Résistance, 1962.
- (in French) Histoire de la France libre, 1963.
- (in French) Jean Moulin l'unificateur, 1964.
- (in French) Combat : histoire d'un mouvement de Résistance de juillet 1940 à juillet 1943, 1967.
- (in French) Vichy : Année 1940, 1967.
- (in French) La Guerre de l'ombre; La Résistance en Europe, 1970.
- (in French) La Drôle de guerre, 1971.
- (in French) La Seconde Guerre Mondiale, 1972.
- (in French) Pétain, Laval, Darlan, trois politiques ?, 1972.
- (in French) Les Fascismes, 1977.
- (in French) Pétain et le régime de Vichy, 1978.
- (in French) Le Procès de Riom, 1979.
- (in French) La Libération de Paris, 1980.
- (in French) La Défaite de la France (septembre 1939-juin 1940, 1980.
- (in French) Histoire de la France libre, 1980.
- (in French) Paris allemand, 1981.
- (in French) Paris résistant, 1982.
- (in French) Et Varsovie fut détruite, 1984.
- The shadow war : Resistance in Europe, 1939-1945, 1972.
- The Second World War, 1975.
