= Charles-Emmanuel Dufourcq =

French historian

Charles-Emmanuel Dufourcq (1914 – 3 March 1982) was a 20th-century French medievalist historian.

In 1978, his book La Vie quotidienne dans l'Europe médiévale sous la domination arabe was awarded the prix Broquette-Gonin (literature) of the Académie française. This book gives a real view of what was the Muslim occupation in Europe, both in Spain and Sicily.

== Principal works ==
- 1966: Un projet castillan du XIIIe siècle : la croisade d'Afrique, Faculté des lettres
- 1966: L'Espagne catalane et le Maghreb aux XIIIe–XIVe, Presses universitaires de France (PUF)
- 1975: La vie quotidienne dans les ports méditerranéens au Moyen Âge : Provence, Languedoc, Catalogne, éditions Hachette
- 1976: Histoire économique et sociale de l'Espagne chrétienne au Moyen Âge, Armand Colin
- 1978: La Vie quotidienne dans l'Europe médiévale sous domination arabe, Hachette

== Bibliography ==
- Pour un aperçu des apports historiographiques de Charles-Emmanuel Dufourcq : "Charles-Emmanuel Dufourcq et le Maghreb médiéval : un itinéraire", par Henri Bresc in Revue de l'Occident musulman et de la Méditerranée, n°35, 1983, p. 175-179

== Prizes ==
- 1980: Prix Broquette-Gonin (literature) for La vie quotidienne dans l’Europe médiévale sous domination arabe.
- 1978: Prix Thérouanne for Histoire économique et sociale de l’Espagne chrétienne au Moyen Âge.
