= Pierre Lamaison =

French anthropologist

Pierre Lamaison (1 August 1948 – 4 June 2001) was a French anthropologist.

== Works ==
- Ethnologie et protection de la nature : Pour une politique du patrimoine ethnologique dans Les parcs naturels

Rapport au Ministère de l'environnement, Direction De La Protection De La Nature
France et Pierre Lamaison et Denis Chevallier
Éditions de l'École des hautes études en sciences sociales, ISBN 2-7132-0820-3

- Généalogie de l'Europe : De la préhistoire au XXe

Pierre Lamaison (direction); Pierre Vidal-Naquet (conseiller historique)
Hachette, ISBN 2-01-015072-4

- L'impossible mariage : Violence et parenté en Gévaudan, XVIIe, XVIIIe et XIXe siècles

Élisabeth Claverie et Pierre Lamaison
Hachette Littérature ISBN 2-01-006518-2
