= Pierre Clémenti (politician) =

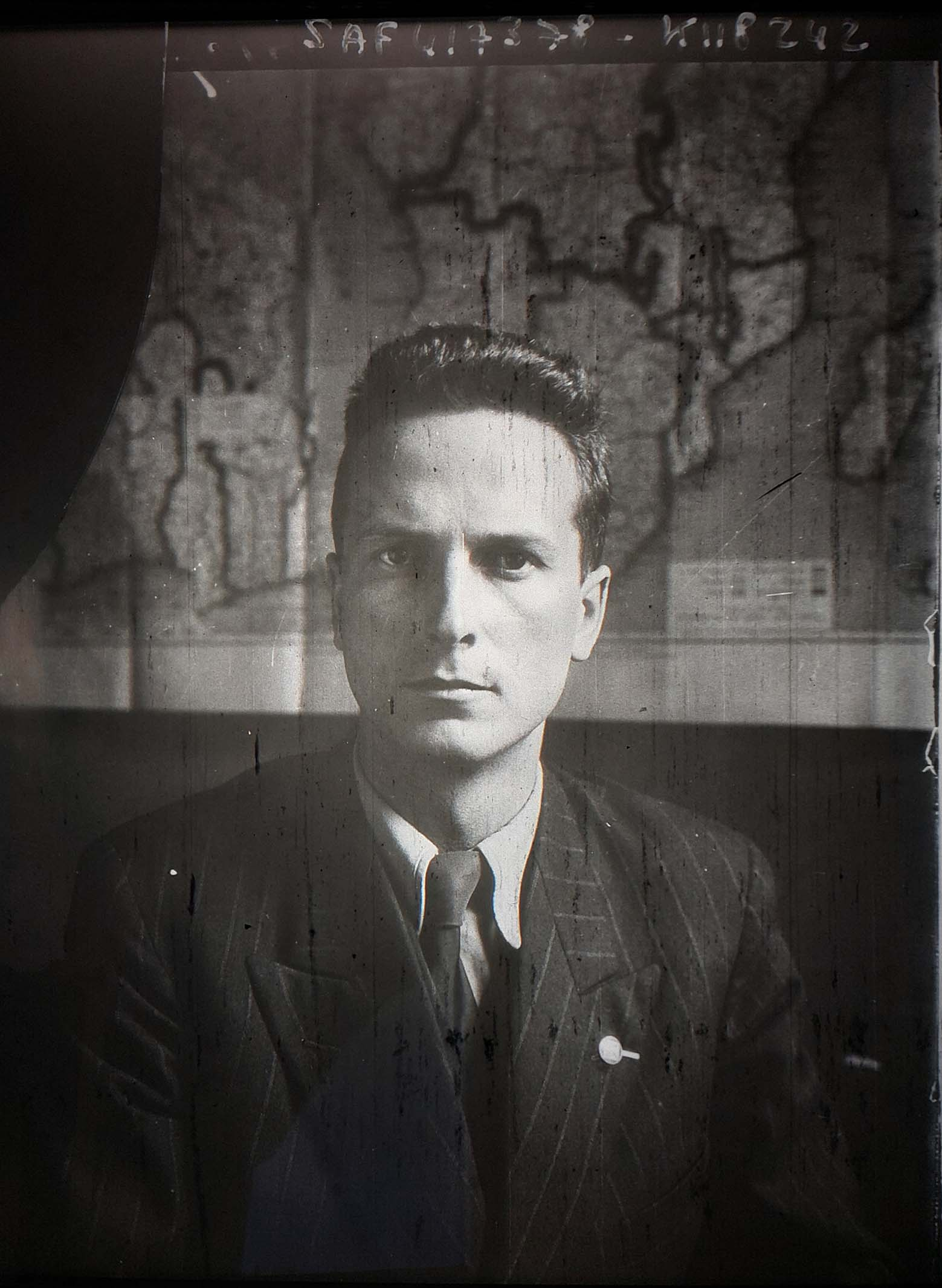
- Born: 28 May 1910; Corsica, France
- Died: 16 April 1982 (aged 71); Paris, France
- Occupations: Politician, publicist, journalist,
- Known for: Leader of the French National-Collectivist Party
- Political party: French National-Collectivist Party; European Rally for Liberty; Ordre Nouveau

Pierre Clementi (28 May 1910 – 16 April 1982), real name Francis Anthony Clementi, was a French politician active during the 1930s and the occupation of France during the Second World War. He was the founder and leader of the French National-Collectivist Party, which espoused a platform of National Communism, a combination of Fascism, French nationalism and to a certain extent Communism.

== Biography ==
Son of a Corsican official who died in the First World War, he was first close to radical socialist circles, then moved towards Fascism in 1934 with the founding of the French National-Communist Party (Parti français national-communiste ), which later changed its name under the orders of the Nazi Occupation to the French National-Collectivist Party (Parti français national-collectiviste), which Clémenti supported. He was the director of the movement's newspaper, fr:Le Pays libre.

in 1941 he helped found the Legion of French Volunteers Against Bolshevism (Légion des volontaires français contre le bolchevisme ) (LVF), and participated in combat in Russia, as did Marcel Bucard's Mouvement Franciste, Marcel Déat's National Popular Rally, Jacques Doriot's French Popular Party and Eugène Deloncle's Social Revolutionary Movement.

After the liberation, he was condemned to death in absentia, but remained in Italy and Germany. He became a member of the Rassemblement européen de la liberté (REL) active from 1966 through 1969, then of Ordre Nouveau, active from 1969 to 1973. He represented the French section of René Binet's Nouvel ordre européen, a European neofascist movement that included the CEDADE in Spain and the Sozialistische Reichspartei in West Germany.

== Publications ==
- Qu'est-ce que le national-communisme?
- Qu'est-ce que le national collectivisme?, 1938
- La Troisième Paix, 1949
