= Victor Barthélemy =

French political activist

Victor Barthélemy (21 July 1906 – 21 October 1985) was a French political activist, operative, and author. Originally a member of the French Communist Party and the Communist International, he moved to the fascist French Popular Party. After an imprisonment for collaboration, he supported far-right causes such as the European Social Movement, the "ultras" side in the Algerian War, the 1965 presidential campaign of Jean-Louis Tixier-Vignancour, and the Front national.

== Biography ==
Barthélemy was born in Bonifacio. His father was a socialist. During his studies at the University of Aix-en-Provence, Barthélemy supported Action Française. He moved to Marseille and joined the French Communist Party (PCF) in 1925. Following the national congress of the PCF in Lille in 1926, delegates appointed him to membership in Secours Rouge International. After an internship in the USSR in 1928, he worked for the Communist International under the command of Palmiro Togliatti. He carried out missions to Spain and Italy.

Barthélemy distanced himself from the PCF in 1930, but eagerly joined the French Popular Party (PPF) of Jacques Doriot on 28 June 1936 and quickly rose through the ranks. Disillusioned with Communism, he was attracted to the "revolutionary authenticity" of fascism and National Socialism. In October 1936 he was appointed to the position of the Federal secretary of the party for the Alpes-Maritimes, centered in Nice. He subsequently joined its central committee and its political bureau. In November 1939, he became secretary-general of the party and was installed in Paris. He was a contributor to L'Émancipation nationale ([The National Emancipation]), and Le Cri du peuple.

When the PPF Congress met in Villeurbanne in July 1941 he was appointed secretary general of both zones. He participated in the creation of the Legion of French Volunteers Against Bolshevism, of which he was member of the Central Committee.

On 6 August 1944, Barthélemy fled Paris ahead of the Allies' advance. He then took refuge in the Sigmaringen enclave. In November 1944, he was chosen to represent the PPF to the Italian Social Republic. After Doriot's death in February 1945, Barthélemy, Simon Sabiani, and Marcel Marschall formed a triumvirate to head the PPF.

Barthélemy moved to Milan, Italy in April 1945. Arrested on 2 May, he was handed over to French authorities, tried by a military tribunal, and sentenced to several years in prison.

=== Post-war ===
After his release, Barthélemy joined the European Social Movement of Maurice Bardèche in 1951. He was on the board of Bardèche's journal Défense de l'Occident ("Defense of the West").

Barthélemy was a member of the Front national pour l'Algérie française (FNAF, National Front for French Algeria); founded in Paris in June 1960 and dissolved by Charles de Gaulle after an "ultra" rebellion in December 1960. He supported the Secours populaire pour l'entraide et la solidarité (1960–1964), whose purpose was to aid OAS prisoners of French Algeria.

Barthélemy became part of the committee to support Jean-Louis Tixier-Vignancour in the December 1965 presidential election.

Barthélemy participated in the creation of the National Front of Jean-Marie Le Pen in 1972 and was its administrative secretary from 1974 to May 1978.

In 1978, his memoir, Du communisme au fascisme, histoire d'un engagement politique ([From Communism to Fascism: A History of Political Commitment]), was published by Éditions Albin Michel. Philip Rees described it as "perhaps the most interesting and revealing of all the accounts of political conversion from extreme left to extreme right and a vital source book for the history of the PPF."

He retired to the south of France. He died in Marseille in 1985 at the age of 79.

== Sources ==
- Biographical Dictionary of the Extreme Right Since 1890 edited by Philip Rees, 1991, ISBN 0-13-089301-3
