= French people (disambiguation) =

French people may refer to:

- in terms of ethnicity: all ethnic French people, in and outside of France
- in territorial terms: people of France, entire population of France, historical or modern
- in modern legal terms: all people who poses the citizenship of France

== Other uses ==
- Rally of the French People, former political party in France
- French People's Party (1936), former political party in France
- French People's Youth (1941), former organization in France

== See also ==
- French (disambiguation)
- France (disambiguation)
