= French National-Collectivist Party =

French far-right party, 1934 to 1944

French National-Collectivist Party Parti français national-collectiviste
- Other name: French National Communist Party
- President: Pierre Clémenti
- Founded: 1934; 92 years ago
- Banned: September 1944; 82 years ago
- Split from: Francistes
- Headquarters: Paris (various locations); Lyon (from 1941)
- Newspaper: Le Pays Libre!
- Women's wing: French Women
- Youth wings: Jeune Front; Gardes Françaises
- Membership: 32,000 (claimed); 800 to 2,000 (independent estimates)
- Ideology: National communism; Fascism (French); Third Position; Racial antisemitism; Dirigisme; Economic nationalism (French); Pan-European nationalism; Rattachism; Anti-Masonry; Collaborationism
- Political position: Syncretic
- National affiliation: Groupe Collaboration (1942)
- Colours: Blue White Red

Party flag

The French National-Collectivist Party (French: Parti français national-collectiviste, PFNC), originally known as the French National Communist Party (Parti français national communiste), was a minor political group active in the French Third Republic and reestablished in occupied France. In both incarnations, its leader was the sports journalist Pierre Clémenti. It espoused a "national communist" platform noted for its similarities with fascism, and popularized racial antisemitism. The group was also noted for its agitation in support of pan-European nationalism and rattachism, maintaining contacts in both Nazi Germany and Wallonia.

Always a minor movement within the French far-right, it was initially a dissident wing of Henry Coston's Francistes. Temporarily re-absorbed by that party in 1934, it reemerged following Coston's personal row with Clémenti. Its activity was interrupted in 1936, though it returned to incite industrial workers against the Popular Front government. Clémenti was the subject of interrogations during the clampdown on La Cagoule, and briefly jailed in early 1939 for spreading racial hatred. Again imprisoned during the Phony War, he fought against Germany in the Battle of France, but immediately after offered to collaborate with the occupiers. The PFNC was allowed to recruit and organize, but had to drop all references to national communism, including in its name.

Although minor, the PFNC had a combative stance on the pluralist scene of French fascism and collaboration. Strongly opposed to the French Popular Party, it had a working relationship with the National Popular Rally. Its rattachist campaigns also made it an adversary of the Rexist Party in occupied Belgium. With several other French parties, the PFNC helped organize the Legion of French Volunteers against Bolshevism, which fought on the Eastern Front against the Soviet Union. This activity consumed Clémenti, leaving his party in disarray. The PFNC absorbed Robert Hersant's Jeune Front, but thereafter was exposed to power struggles between Hersant and other party militants, involving the German authorities as arbiters.

Centered on Lyon after 1941, the PFNC was only formally active during the Liberation of Paris, when it was officially proscribed. Facing a death penalty, Clémenti evaded capture for several years, and was eventually pardoned. He attempted to infuse his ideas into the European Freedom Union, which he briefly led in the late 1960s. The ideological legacy was also embraced by the newspaper Socialisme Européen, put out by Clémenti's godson Pierre Vial.

== History ==
=== Origins ===
The National Communist Party was one of the groups emerging from the political crisis of February 6, 1934: its first reported gathering was on February 7 at Place de la Concorde, although some sources see its foundation date as April 7, 1934. Its creator was the young Corsican Clémenti, at the time still a sports columnist for the Radical-Party press. His involvement with militant French nationalism had already been attested by that moment: in 1932, Clémenti sat on the leadership board of the National League of French Youth, established by Jean Conart. In August 1933, he assisted Henry Coston in creating the Francistes party (itself a dissidence of the Mouvement Franciste). Coston and his followers advocated racial supremacism for those of "French blood" and maintained ample contacts with the Nazi Party, which were facilitated by Georges de Pottere. As seen by journalist René Dunan, Coston was the PFNC's true founder.

A contemporary piece in Regards had it that the PFNC was one of the vehicles for "French fascism", alongside Solidarité Française and Croix-de-Feu, and, like these, only existed because of the February crisis. "Numerically insignificant", Clémenti's organization was seen by Regards as copying the Nazis. Historian Hans Werner Neulen argues that, "despite its name", the new group was modeled on Falangism and Italian fascism. According to scholar Miklós Horváth, the PFNC "was a near-perfect 'anti-party', in that it was almost entirely defined by its opposition to other persons or ideologies"; it was antisemitic, anti-Masonic, anti-capitalist, and anti-communist. The PFNC platform included what Clémenti called a "heroic concept of social life", with references to social justice and with a role reserved for trade unions, but all within a totalitarian state; the PFNC advocated dirigisme and economic nationalism, promising to clamp down on capital flight. In his notes on the subject, Clémenti suggested that a "state protective of man's labor" was his social and economic ideal, arguing that the Great Depression could be tackled once "the worker and the owner [are united] against their common enemy: the capitalist." He viewed this project as capable of uprooting both Marxism and economic liberalism. He announced that his mission was to "regenerate the better elements of the working class."

Dunan made mention of the "totalitarian methods" proposed by Clémenti, viewing them as a derivative of Nazism. Regards highlighted anti-communism as the leading component of all "French fascist" ideology, viewing all federated groups as united by an invisible thread and a shared belief in the "red peril". Contrarily, researcher Jacques Leclercq sees the PFNC as distinguished by its racial antisemitism, which took "one of the most violent" forms. The final point in the PFNC platform was a promise to expel French Jews and other "foreigners". Clémenti's nationalism also manifested itself as rattachism: the partition of Belgium along ethnic borders and the creation of la plus grande France ("Greater France"). Beginning in 1934, he had direct contacts in the right wing of the Walloon Movement, including Jules Mahieu and Juste Wasterlain. The Sûreté suspected that his friends in Wallonia also included arms traffickers, as the PFNC had reportedly tried to arm itself with automatic rifles purchased in Liège in 1934.

The PFNC organ was Le Pays Libre! ("The Free Country!"), with its editorial offices in Paris, at Champs-Élysées, 28. It "distinguished itself with violent attacks on both the Muscovite [communist] ideal and the grand capitalist oligarchies." The party logo showed four converging arrowheads over a diamond and a circle, with the French national colors. Originally, it viewed itself as a youth organization, participating in the "Estates General of Youth" clubs alongside the Jeunesses Patriotes, the Ligue d'Action Universitaire Républicaine et Socialiste, and the Libre République des Jeunes. The PFNC organization eventually formed a youth paramilitary force known as "French Guards" (Gardes Françaises).

=== Conflicts and repression ===
Scholar Dietrich Orlow notes that the PFNC was viewed as a potential ally by some agents of Nazi Germany, though even these observers "saw little future for [its] influence". Dunan recounts that Clémenti was a frequent guest at Nazi Party rallies, and had befriended its chief propagandist, Julius Streicher. In July–August 1934, the PFNC was effectively absorbed by Coston's movement; Clémenti took over as the Francistes president. The entire movement fell apart once Clémenti seduced Coston's estranged wife, meaning that the National Communists were again an independent group. In this early period, the reestablished party could only field the minimum number required for registration, leading the group to dissolve itself in 1936. Le Pays Libre! was also closed down a year later.

Some evidence suggest that during late 1936 and early 1937 the PFNC remained active in opposition to the Popular Front government, which it identified as a "Jewish" cartel. Peak agitation in support of rattachism was reached by the party in October 1936, with Clémenti openly calling for a military attack on Belgium. His article, published in support of the Walloon fascist Léon Degrelle (deemed a persona non grata on French territory), was described by French authorities as a tense moment in Belgium–France relations. The party was especially critical of the pro-government trade union federation, or General Confederation of Labor, inciting workers to rebel against it. However, the PFNC also had a consuming rivalry with Jacques Doriot's far-right organization, called French Popular Party (PPF). Clémenti described Doriot as an agent of the Jews and a covert, unrepentant Marxist.

The PFNC was again registered in June 1937, when Clémenti went on record with the claim that it was neither fascist nor anti-fascist. He argued that anti-fascism meant either an ill-advised attack on the Italian government, thus setting France on a collision course with a "friendly nation"; or an attack on "generic ideas", which Clémenti identified as shared by both Italian fascists and the French Communist Party. In September 1937, following bombing attacks by members of La Cagoule, he was interrogated by police. Clémenti stated his sympathy for the group, while criticizing its methods; he also argued that the attacks were in fact staged by a Trotskyist cell of Simca employees. During the far-right rally of February 1938, the PFNC deposed a wreath commemorating its "precursors, the martyrs of February 6, 1934".

Following the Munich Agreement and its revelations about Nazi ambitions, Clémenti was placed under surveillance. He thus entered a police file on "defeatist" campaigners, also featuring Nazi apologists (Louis Darquier de Pellepoix, Léon Daudet) and far-left pacifists (Marceau Pivert). However, Dunan claims that, despite customs and warning signs, the Police Prefecture still had no detailed file on the PFNC leader in 1939. In June of that year, the party headquarters on Boulevard de Sébastopol, 87 were ultimately raided by police. This followed the passage of laws against racial hatred and foreign propaganda. A simultaneous raid descended upon the antisemitic magazine Le Porc-épic, which was located in the same building as Le Pays Libre!.

In August, Clémenti was found guilty of distributing anti-Jewish tracts, which he claimed were in fact authored by the staff writers of Le Porc-épic. Reporting on the sentencing, the leftist newspaper Le Populaire described the PFNC as "outrageously fascist". The presiding judge invoked the memory of Jews "who died for France" in World War I, noting that Clémenti had sullied it. The punishment meted, however, was minimal, as Clémenti had "promised not to start over". In the wake of sentencing, the PFNC submitted an open letter to the press, correcting the record by noting that Clémenti had been cleared of charges relating to Nazi propaganda. This text argued that the party's antisemitism was not the same as Nazi racial politics, but a set of original "methods [...] for the defense of the nation, the family, and the race."

=== Collaborationist party ===
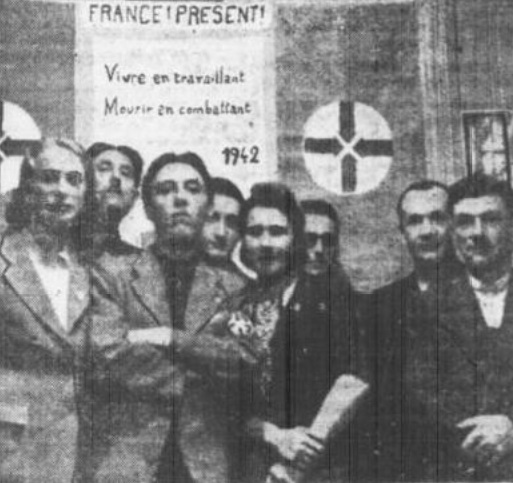
Group photograph of the PFNC section in Caen, 1943

Shortly after the Nazi invasion of Poland, as France began preparing for war, Clémenti issued public threats against Édouard Daladier, the Council President. He faced trial for this and was ordered to pay over 4,000 French francs in damages. During the Phony War of September 1939, he was imprisoned for another three months, but ultimately managed to persuade government that he was still loyal, and fought with distinction in the Battle of France. Shortly after the surrender of June 1940, Clémenti became one of the first voluntary Nazi collaborators in occupied France. His party was restored later in the summer of 1940, with the same acronym—which now stood for "French National-Collectivist Party". The name-change was done at the behest of Clémenti's German overseers, but only made legal on September 10, 1940, when the PFNC inaugurated its new headquarters at Rue de l'Arcade, 20, in the 8th arrondissement of Paris.

Clémenti informed the international press that his group stood for "the purification of the French race, the fight against Jewry and Freemasonry." The National-Collectivists also opened new affiliate bodies. A "Special Guard", with its own uniforms and rallying cries, was created from the party elite. In late August 1940, the French Guards, styled "group of anti-Jewish action of the French National-Collectivist Party", announced that they were also creating female youth chapters. The Guards were led by Charles Lefebvre; by then, the party had also annexed Robert Hersant's youth party, the Jeune Front, which maintained a separate existence within the "anti-Jewish and anti-Masonic movement". According to one account in Magyar Nemzet, Jeune Front was in fact the name adopted by an alliance between the PFNC and "several movements with similar tendencies". By 1941, the PFNC as a whole had a female section, called "French Women" (Femmes Françaises).

The usage of armbands with the "inverted arrow-cross" was nominally covered by a ban on political insignia, but PFNC members struggled to prove that they qualified as an exception. This interval witnessed the first tensions between party cadres and the occupation authorities: in August, the French Guards attacked youth hostels and Jewish-owned businesses along the Champs-Élysées, forcing the Germans to intervene as peacekeepers. By January 1941, German authorities had recognized the PNFC as one of five officially collaborationist parties, with a right to organize in occupied territory and with duties in persuading the regime of Vichy France to also embrace full collaboration. Le Pays Libre! reopened in February 1941, and remained in print to August 1944. It and the PFNC were joined by a new cadre, Jacques Dursort, who in April 1941 began publishing articles targeting French Jews, and openly discussing their coming extermination; one of these asked: "Jews, would it take pogroms for you to understand?"

Despite a more favorable political climate, the party remained an exceedingly minor force in French wartime politics and society. Horváth suggests that Clémenti could only gather at most 2,000 affiliates, even though, in chronological terms, his was "the first incarnation of French fascism". Neulen gives the PFNC membership as 800, well below the PPF's 22,000. As Leclercq notes, most members were recruited from the French working class. Clémenti boasted that the reborn PFNC had 32,000 members—though, as noted by historian David Littlejohn, "this was almost certainly a gross overestimate." Despite arguing that Germany and France were now equal allies within "Socialist Europe" and the Axis powers, Clémenti paid his homages to the subordinate government of Vichy; he himself declared war on the United Kingdom "in a private capacity". In mid 1941, he was a founding member and leading activist of the Legion of French Volunteers against Bolshevism (LVF), which became the main focus of his activity as a collaborator. His party was one of the five movements represented on the LVF steering committee, submitting to control by Marcel Déat's National Popular Rally (RNP). In its communique of July 8, 1941, the PFNC welcomed the creation of the LVF and offered to party squads, "eventually including the French Women", to fight for Vichy in places such as French West Africa and Mandatory Syria.

=== Decline and disappearance ===
In late 1941 the PFNC established itself in Vichy-governed territory, at Lyon, where it endured a steady decline. National-Collectivist paramilitaries continued to be active in Paris. RNP and PFNC squads were patrolling the streets in August 1941, shortly after the French Resistance had tried but failed to assassinate Déat. Clémenti was still present in the occupied zone and, in March 1942, was briefly detained in Fresnes Prison. This was a literal enforcement of his 1939 fine, unusual since, at the time, Daladier had been captured by Vichy and was facing charges for treason in the "Riom Trial". From August or September, Clémenti was entirely absent from France, fighting alongside the LVF on the Eastern Front. A commentator for the Feuille d'Avis de Neuchatel et du Vignoble Neuchâtelois noted the similarity between Clémenti and his enemy Doriot, in that they both had "the originality of leaving chiefdom in their own movement and sign up for the Legion". Academic J. G. Shields also draws this parallel, suggesting that most other collaborators "contented themselves with 'defending Western civilisation' by being part of the LVF's organisational apparatus in Paris". By 1943, both the PFNC and the RNP were supplying cadres for the Milice, which was created by Vichy to fight the "internal war" against anti-fascists. The party was nevertheless riddled with "internecine quarrels [which] drove most of its supporters away." Hersant was actively pursuing a takeover of the PFNC; this attempt created tensions and violence, and caused Clémenti to view German occupation with less enthusiasm than before.

The party's advocacy for a Greater France was also frustrated by Germany and Vichy. Clémenti asked that the Germans allow rattachism to happen, suggesting that this grant would seal a lasting Franco–German alliance. He remains the only French collaborator to state a specific territorial claim on Belgium, and as such found himself "in direct conflict" with Degrelle's Rexist Party, which stood for Belgian nationalism under German tutelage. In October 1941, Vichy leader Philippe Pétain disavowed Walloon separatism, which had also been subject to attacks by Rexists such as Paul Colin. Colin's newspaper Cassandre depicted the PFNC as a subsidiary of the Action Française, and alleged that Clémenti took his pay from Henry du Moulin de Labarthète. Also in October 1941, the German authorities in Belgium clamped down on the rattachist Walloons after observing their contacts with the PFNC.

Le Pays Libre! survived Clémenti's departure, but also moved to Lyon before or during the German takeover of Vichy France. Its editor, Eric Labat, was noted for his earlier support of the Spanish Nationalists. He became the PFNC spokesman, reporting that the party had no intention of fusing with other collaborationist bodies so as to form a one-party state. As Labat explained, the PFNC had "suffered to maintain its doctrine", and expected to eventually emerge as France's legitimate single-party. Such ambitions were contrasted by outside verdicts: already in November 1941, frustrated German authorities reported that the PFNC and the similarly endowed Le Feu had become "phantom parties". The name of French Guards was casually taken over by its PPF rivals, and applied to Doriot's own street fighters' units. According to Littlejohn, this appropriation took place in September 1942, and suggested that the PFNC had wholly disintegrated by that moment in time.

Eventually, Labat also left to fight on the Eastern Front. Various sources indicate that local cells of the party were still active to 1944. By December 1942, "Pierre T." of the PFNC and formerly of the Communist Youth had been installed as head of the Compulsory Labor Service in Calvados, where he ran a deceptive recruitment drive. Also then, the PFNC Calvados branch announced its affiliation to the Groupe Collaboration—although, for technical reasons, it was noticeably late in doing so. Historian Etienne Dejonghe additionally informs that the first ever PFNC cells in Nord and Pas-de-Calais opened as late as September 1943. The PFNC also had a section in Côte-d'Or. Its presence there was largely symbolic, and finally curbed by the Germans after a brawl between the party's Guards and a number of students at Dijon University.

== Posterity ==
Shortly after the Liberation of Paris, the PFNC and LVF were formally charged as "anti-national groups", and had their offices raided by the French Forces of the Interior. Following the full reconquest of France in 1944, Clémenti withdrew with other collaborators to safety in Germany; he was then able to obtain asylum in Switzerland, where he continued to publish essays explaining his beliefs. Also hunted by the Resistance, Labat escaped to Spain. In December 1944, France's Provisional Government defined all members of the PFNC active after January 1, 1941, as guilty of indignité nationale. Dursort escaped scrutiny and passed himself off as a Resistance veteran, being enlisted by the Rally of the French People.

Clémenti's European nationalism was revised to include talk of an anti-communist alliance between SS veterans and the right wing of French, German and Italian resistance movements. He also revised his anti-Soviet stance, claiming that Russia would learn to shed Marxism in exchange for a "national socialism" of the "Third Way". In 1951, he became co-founder and publicist for the New European Order (NOE), which also included Gaston-Armand Amaudruz, René Binet, Pino Rauti, Fritz Rössler, and Paul van Tienen. Researchers Jean-Yves Camus and Nicolas Lebourg conclude that Clémenti fitted well with the Europeanist trend of neo-fascism: "Immediately after the collapse of the Axis powers, Fascist militants saw a united Europe as the justification for their previous positions and as the horizon of expectation that could legitimize their continued political struggle. In particular, [their] pro-Russian leanings [...] allowed them to claim that their plans for Europe could be a solution to the Cold War."

Clémenti was tried in absentia and sentenced to death, but was pardoned and allowed to return in the 1950s. Noting that he was on probation by 1953, the Communist paper La Défense alleged that the Fourth Republic was using his skills as a propagandist for the Special Air Service, which was fighting the war in Indochina. Seven years later, a scandal ensued after Dursort's wartime activities were exposed to public scrutiny while he was serving on the Parisian Council. His party, the Union for the New Republic, had forced him to resign by 1961. Later in the 1960s, Clémenti reemerged as a figure on the French far-right, also taking up Holocaust denialism. He managed to obtain absolute control over a far-right populist group called European Freedom Union (REL). His hosting of readings from the Mein Kampf and attempts to establish contacts with the National Democratic Party of Germany sparked an exodus among REL members. The PFNC tenets were again revived following the May 1968 riots by a new generation of national communists and pan-European nationalists, including Clémenti's godson Pierre Vial, formerly affiliated with Jeune Nation. Clémenti became a co-founder of Ordre Nouveau, a "revolutionary nationalist force" made up of former associates of Pierre Poujade with erstwhile conspirators in La Cagoule and Organisation Armée Secrète. Expelled from NOE in 1971, he created a dissident journal, L'Action Européenne, which he edited together with François Duprat. Vial helped put out the newspaper Socialisme Européen, itself a precursor of the radical think-tank GRECE.
