= Maurice-Yvan Sicard =

French journalist, far right political activist, & Nazi collaborator (1910-2000)

Maurice-Ivan Sicard (nom de plume Saint-Paulien; 21 May 1910 in Le Puy-en-Velay – 10 December 2000) was a French journalist, far right political activist, and Nazi collaborator.

== Biography ==
Initially a teacher and journalist for such mainstream publications as Spectateur and Germinal Sicard joined the Parti Populaire Français in 1936 and soon took over the editorship of their journal Jeunesses de France. He took over editing duties on their main journal L'Émancipation nationale in 1937 and soon became a leading figure within the party, joining their Politburo in 1938. He also served the PPF as Propaganda Secretary.

As a writer Sicard was noted for his highly pro-German and anti-Semitic views and so it was no surprise that he became involved in collaborationism following the Nazi occupation. As well as continuing to edit L'Émancipation nationale for the duration of the occupation he was also appointed national secretary for press and propaganda for the Vichy regime in 1942. He also served on the central committee of Philippe Pétain's Rassemblement pour la Révolution nationale and was a member of the Comité d’action antibolchévique.

As well as in government Sicard's standing within the PPF also grew as the war went on. He was part of the directorate that ran the party during Jacques Doriot's service with the Legion of French Volunteers Against Bolshevism. In this role he demonstrated a rare instance of non-collaboration in December 1943 when, by then the effective leader of the PPF, he boycotted a German-organised rally for Marcel Déat's attempt at creating an umbrella movement in the National Revolutionary Front.

Nevertheless, in September 1944 Sicard was one of a number of French collaborators who went into exile in Germany, although unlike supporters of the former Vichy regime housed at Sigmaringen, the PPF was based at Mainau. Following the war he went into exile in Madrid. Sentenced to prison in absentia he was amnestied and returned to France in 1957 to write under his Saint-Paulien alter ego. Arguing in defence of the collaborators, his work appeared in the likes of Minute, Ecrits de Paris, Rivarol, Arriba and Dominique Venner's Europe-Action. He also became an active supporter of Jeune Nation.
