= Silly =

Silly may refer to:

== Places ==
- Silly, Belgium, a town
- Silly Department, a department or commune of Sissili Province in southern Burkina Faso

=== France ===
- Silly-en-Gouffern, French commune in the Orne department
- Silly-en-Saulnois, French commune in the Moselle department
- Silly-le-Long, French commune in the Oise department
- Silly-sur-Nied, French commune in the Moselle department
- Silly-Tillard, French commune in the Oise department
- Mouterre-Silly, French commune in the Vienne department

== Music ==
- Silly (band), an East German rock group from the 1970s
- The Sillies, an American punk rock band formed in 1977
- Silly (album), the 2008 debut album by Taiwanese singer and songwriter Queen Wei
- "Silly" (song), a 1981 song by Deniece Williams

== People ==
- Gilbert Bécaud (1927–2001), born François Silly, French singer, composer, pianist and actor
- Gaylord Silly (born 1986), long distance runner from the Seychelles
- John Silly (died 1672), English politician and Member of Parliament
- Roland Silly, French trade unionist and politician, collaborator during the German World War II occupation of France

== Other uses ==
- silly, the adjective of Silliness
- Silly, a fielding position in the sport of cricket
- Mr. Silly, the tenth book in the Mr. Men children's book series
- Silly Symphony, an animated film series

== See also ==
- Isles of Scilly, a UK archipelago
- Sili (disambiguation)
