= Henri Barbé =

French politician (1902–1966)

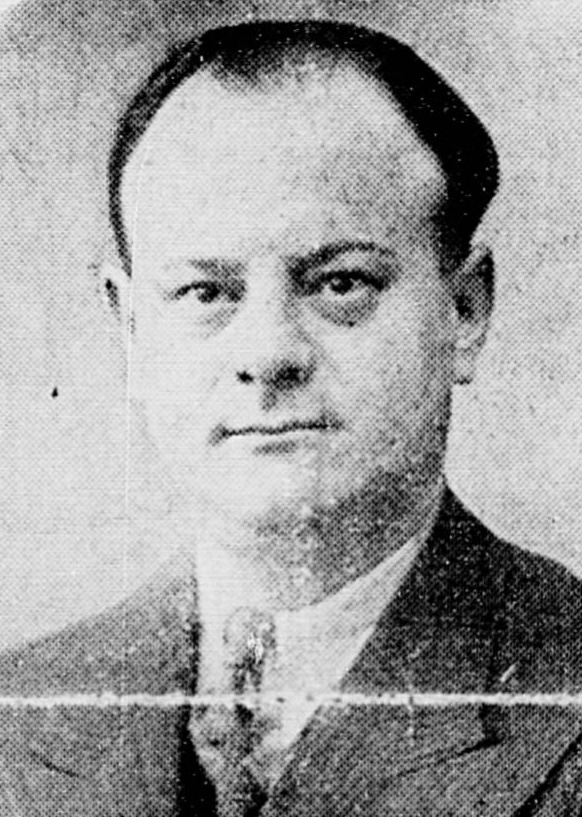
Henri Barbé in the 1930s.

Henri Barbé (14 March 1902, Paris – 24 May 1966, Paris) was a French political activist who moved from early leadership roles in the French Communist movement to far-right collaboration during the German occupation. A former head of the Young Communists and a member of the Comintern apparatus, he later became a leader in the French Popular Party and an organizer within the National Popular Rally during Vichy France. After the Liberation, he was convicted by a court of justice and imprisoned; in the postwar years he took part in anti-communist publishing and, after converting to Catholicism, contributed to Catholic periodicals including Itinéraires.

== Early life and communist activism ==
A metallurgical worker by trade, Barbé joined the Young Socialists at 15 in Saint-Denis and, after the split of the Congress of Tours (December 1920), adhered to the new Communist Party (SFIC/PCF). In early 1926 he was appointed to lead the Young Communists and, at the June 1926 Lille congress, confirmed in that responsibility; in 1928 he entered the PCF political bureau and worked with the Comintern.

== The Barbé–Célor affair ==
In 1931 the PCF underwent a leadership crisis known as the “Barbé–Célor affair,” during which Barbé and Pierre Célor were removed from the political bureau amid criticism from the Comintern representative Dmitry Manuilsky. The episode paved the way for Maurice Thorez’s consolidation at the party’s head and marked Barbé’s marginalization. After a period in Moscow and repeated self-criticisms, Barbé was expelled from the PCF in 1934 for “ultra-left” deviations.

== From communism to the French Popular Party ==
Following his expulsion, Barbé gravitated to the orbit of Jacques Doriot. The French Popular Party (Parti populaire français, PPF) was founded on 28 June 1936; Barbé joined its leadership and served as secretary-general until late 1939.

== Occupation and collaboration ==
During the Occupation, Barbé joined the National Popular Rally (Rassemblement national populaire, RNP) of Marcel Déat and became an organizer in Déat’s attempt to create a single mass collaborationist party. In early 1943, the RNP launched the Front révolutionnaire national (FRN); Barbé was appointed its secretary-general to rally various collaborationist formations, although the initiative failed to absorb Doriot’s PPF.

== Prosecution and later life ==
After the Liberation, Barbé was tried by the Seine court of justice. On 18 April 1947 he was sentenced to ten years of forced labor for treason. He was released before the end of the decade and joined the team around Georges Albertini, contributing to the BEIPI bulletin (later the review Est & Ouest) that promoted “reasoned and scientific” anti-communism. In the early 1950s he converted to Catholicism and thereafter wrote in Catholic periodicals, including Itinéraires.

== Sources ==
- Philippe Robrieux, Histoire intérieure du Parti communiste, Fayard, vols. I & IV.
- Robert Soucy, French Fascism: The Second Wave, 1933–1939, Yale University Press, 1995.
