= Pierre Célor =

French politician (1902–1957)

Pierre Célor (19 April 1902, Tulle, Corrèze – 6 April 1957) was a French politician who was a member of the French Communist Party from 1923, becoming one of the four secretaries of its Central Committee in 1929, beside Maurice Thorez and Henri Barbé. However, he fell into disgrace after the Comintern expelled him from the PCF. In 1942 he joined the Parti populaire français (PPF) of Jacques Doriot.

After the Second World War, he was sentenced to seven years in prison for collaboration but was granted amnesty and was released in 1947. He participated in the anti-Communist review Est&Ouest and became close to traditional Catholics.

== Sources ==
- Philippe Robrieux, Histoire intérieure du parti communiste, T1 et T4, Fayard, Paris.
