= Pierre Vaillandet =

French politician

Pierre Vaillandet (13 May 1888 - 25 November 1971) was a French politician.

Vaillandet was born in Versailles. He represented the French Section of the Workers' International (SFIO) in the Chamber of Deputies from 1936 to 1940. On 10 July 1940 he voted in favour of granting the Cabinet presided by Marshal Philippe Pétain authority to draw up a new constitution, thereby effectively ending the French Third Republic and establishing Vichy France. Later on, he became one of the leaders of the National Popular Rally (RNP). He fled to Germany on 15 August 1944, shortly before the Liberation of Paris.
