= Fascism in Britain: An Annotated Bibliography =

1979 book by Philip Rees

Fascism in Britain
- Cover of the first edition
- Author: Philip Rees
- Language: English
- Subject: Fascism
- Publisher: Harvester Press
- Publication date: 1979
- Publication place: United Kingdom
- Media type: Print
- Pages: 243 (first edition)
- ISBN: 0-85527-911-7

Fascism in Britain: An Annotated Bibliography is a book by Philip Rees. It is a bibliography of publications and articles by and about fascists and the radical right in Great Britain. It opens with an introductory essay: "What Is Fascism?"

It was published in 1979 as a 243-page hardcover by Harvester Press in Britain and Humanities Press in the United States.
