= Michel Brille =

French politician (1895–1973)

Michel Brille (26 December 1895 – 14 January 1973) was a French politician.

Brille was born in Paris. He represented the Democratic Republican Alliance in the Chamber of Deputies from 1936 to 1940. On 10 July 1940 he voted in favour of granting the Cabinet presided by Marshal Philippe Pétain authority to draw up a new constitution, thereby effectively ending the French Third Republic and establishing Vichy France. Later on, he belonged to the leadership of the National Popular Rally (RNP).
