= National Popular Rally =

National Popular Rally Rassemblement national populaire
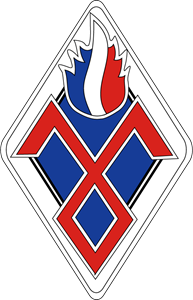
- President: Marcel Déat
- General Secretary: Georges Albertini
- Founded: 1941
- Dissolved: 1945
- Headquarters: Vichy
- Newspaper: Le National Populaire
- Ideology: French fascism: Antisemitism; Collaborationism; Neo-Jacobinism; Neosocialism; Pan-Europeanism; Anti-communism
- Political position: Far-right
- Colours: Blue, red, white

Party flag

The National Popular Rally (French: Rassemblement national populaire, RNP, 1941–1944) was a French political party and one of the main collaborationist parties under the Vichy regime of World War II.

Created in February 1941 by former members of the French Section of the Workers' International (SFIO) of the neosocialist tendency and led by Marcel Déat, the party was heavily influenced by Fascism and saw the circumstances of the occupation as an opportunity to revolutionize France.

== February–October 1941: the RNP-MSR period ==
Marcel Déat, a neosocialist expelled from the SFIO in November 1933 and former Minister, first proposed to create a single state party during the 1940 summer, immediately following the proclamation of the Vichy regime. Briefly arrested by the French police on 13 December 1940, he finally created the RNP in February 1941, which became one of the primary collaborationist parties, along with Jacques Doriot's French Popular Party (PPF), Marcel Bucard's Francisme and Pierre Clémenti's French National-Collectivist Party.

Immediately, the German authorities imposed a fusion between Marcel Déat's RNP and the far-right Social Revolutionary Movement (MSR) of Eugène Deloncle, an inheritor of the Cagoule terrorist group. The first committee of direction of the RNP-MSR was composed of two RNP members and three MSR members: Marcel Déat, Jean Fontenoy, Jean Van Ormelingen (alias Jean Vanor), Eugène Deloncle and Jean Goy.

However, the fusion between the RNP and the MSR was a failure, in part because Déat's RNP recruited mainly among former members of the French Left while the MSR was from the beginning located on the far-right of the political spectrum. The MSR conserved de facto its autonomy inside the RNP and was mainly charged of forming the RNP's security service. After the assassination attempt of Paul Collette against Pierre Laval, Marshal Philippe Pétain's Prime Minister and Marcel Déat on 27 August 1941, the latter accused the MSR of having attempted to eliminate him. Thereafter, the MSR was excluded from the RNP in October 1941, leading to the reorganization of the RNP (and exclusion of elements close to the MSR) until the first months of 1942.

== The RNP without the MSR (after October 1941) ==
The ideology of the RNP was clearly of a fascist nature, advocating antisemitic and racist policies and sharing a strong admiration for Nazi Germany. Despite this, it differed from Jacques Doriot's French Popular Party (PPF) in that it maintained the principle of universal suffrage, public education, anti-clericalism or the conservation of sculptures of Marianne, a republican symbol, in the townhalls. Those ideas created constant conflicts between the RNP and more reactionary elements of Vichy who also supported the Révolution nationale ("National Revolution") and had been trained in the Action française monarchist movement.

On a tactic level, the RNP supported Pierre Laval and criticized the "Vichy reactionaries" and the PPF. Marcel Déat maintained close links with the German ambassador in Paris, Otto Abetz, whilst Doriot turned himself towards the SS. After Laval's return to government in April 1942 and the Nazi occupation of the Southern Zone in November 1942, Déat focused all his efforts on creating a single party of the Collaboration which would permit him to impose himself as its sole leader. In November 1942, the leaders of the RNP, Déat and Georges Albertini, met with MSR leaders such as Georges Soulès. Following this meeting, the RNP created the National Revolutionary Front (Front révolutionnaire national, FRN) which gathered the main collaborationist parties, apart from Doriot's PPF. The FRN thus included the RNP-Labour Social Front, the MSR, the Parti franciste, the Groupe Collaboration, the Jeunes de l'Europe nouvelle and the Comité d’action antibolchévique (Anti-Bolshevik Action Committee). Déat furthermore managed to gain to his side the secretary of the PPF, Jean Fossati, and named to the head of the FRN Henri Barbé, issued from the PPF. However, the FRN finally was a failure.

In March 1944, Déat was named Minister of Labour and of National Solidarity and took as assistants the RNP leaders (Georges Albertini, Georges Dumoulin, Ludovic Zoretti and Gabriel Lafaye) From then on, he focused more on his ministry tasks than on the organization of the RNP.

On 17 August 1944, Déat took refuge in Nazi Germany almost alone. In charge of the youth organisation of the RNP, Roland Gaucher would also accompany Pétain into exile in the Sigmaringen enclave.

== Organisation of the RNP following October 1941 ==
The RNP had at maximum 30,000 members. According to the historian Robert Soucy, it had only 2,638 party members, of whom only 12.8 percent were industrial workers.

Its mouthpiece, directed by Roland Gaucher, was Le National Populaire, but the party was also supported by Déat's daily, L'Œuvre.

The youth organisation (Jeunesses nationales populaires, JNP) was headed by Roland Silly, Roland Gaucher (future co-founder of the National Front in 1972) and eight other personalities.

== Primary members of the RNP (after October 1941) ==
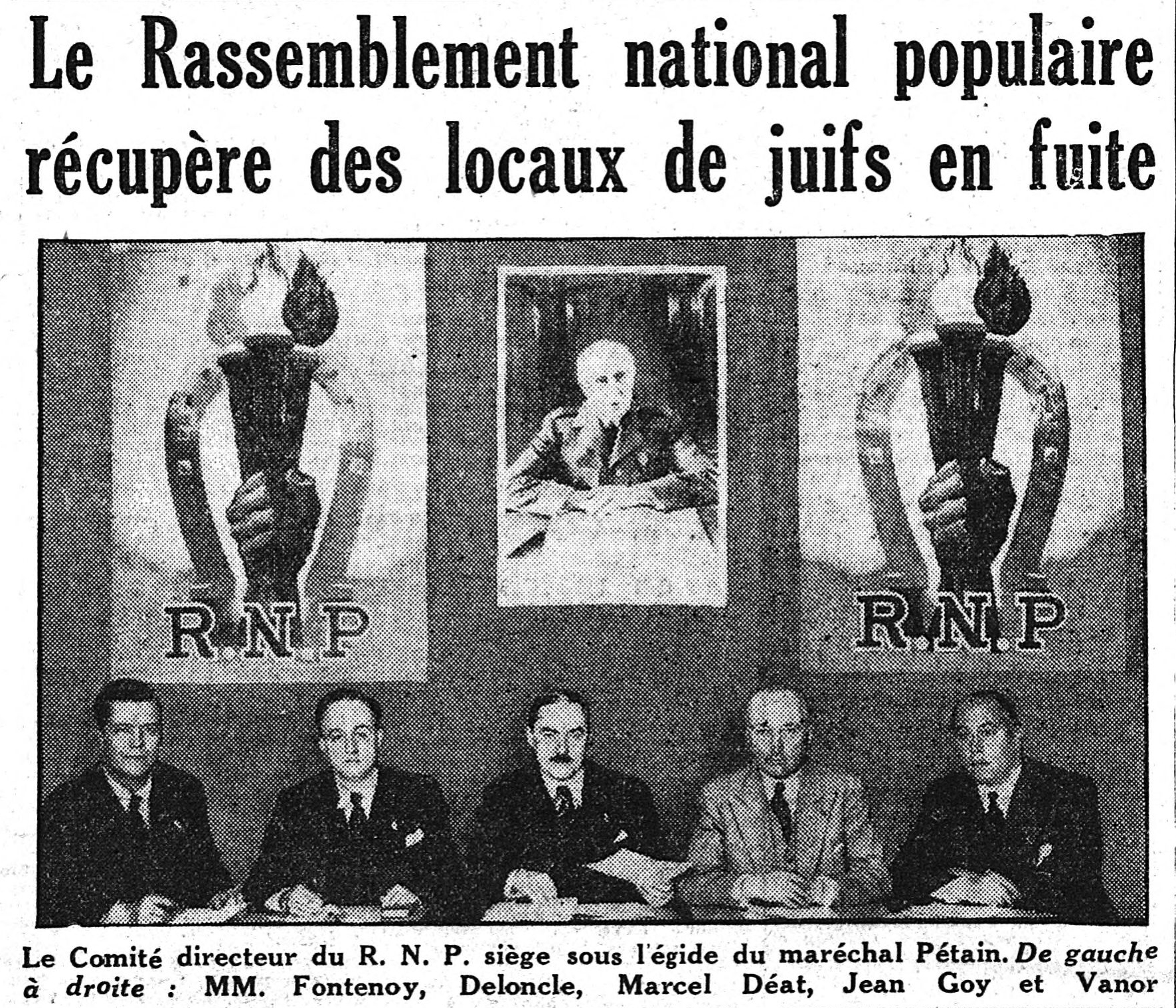
RNP members: Jean Fontenoy, Eugène Deloncle, Marcel Déat, Jean Goy and Jean Van Ormelingen.

The RNP was directed by a permanent commission of 15 members. According to a February 1943 list, these included:

- Président: Marcel Déat
- General secretary: Georges Albertini (former secretary of the Jeunesses socialistes, future creator of the Est-Ouest magazine)
- Vice president (from January 1943): Maurice Levillain (neosocialist)
- Vice président (from January 1943): Michel Brille (former deputy of the Democratic Alliance)
- Henri Barbé (former member of the French Communist Party's political bureau, excluded in 1934 and general secretary of the PPF from 1936 to 1939)
- René Benedetti (neosocialist)
- Francis Desphilippon
- Georges Dumoulin
- Emile Favier (neosocialist)
- Jacques Guionnet
- Gabriel Lafaye (neosocialist, state secretary in Camille Chautemps's government in 1938)
- Barthélémy Montagnon (former SFIO deputy, expelled in 1933, then neosocialist)
- Georges Rivollet (former Minister of War Veterans in right-wing governments of 1934–1935)
- Roland Silly (former member of the SFIO)
- Ludovic Zoretti (trade unionist)

=== Expelled personalities ===
- Jean Goy (conservative) and Charles Spinasse (Minister of the Popular Front), both expelled in 1942 on charges of being too moderate
- René Château (Radical-Socialist) expelled in 1943

=== Other RNP personalities ===
- François Brigneau (future co-founder of the National Front)
- Pierre Célor
- Roland Gaucher (1919–2007), in charge of the RNP's youth organisation and of the RNP Parisian section from May to November 1943 as well as future founder of the National Front in 1972
- André Grisoni
- Fernand Hamard
- Henri Jacob
- Paul Perrin
- Pierre Vigne, trade union leader

== See also ==
- French Popular Party – associated with former French Communist Party members

== Sources ==
- Pierre-Philippe Lambert and Le Marec. Organisation Mouvements et unités de l'État français Vichy 1940–1944. Paris. Éditions Grancher. 1992.
- Pascal Ory. Les Collaborateurs 1940–1945. Paris: Le Seuil. 1976.
- Reinhold Brender. Marcel Déat und das Rassemblement National Populaire, Edition Oldenbourg. Munich. 1992.
