= René Château =

French philosopher, poet and politician

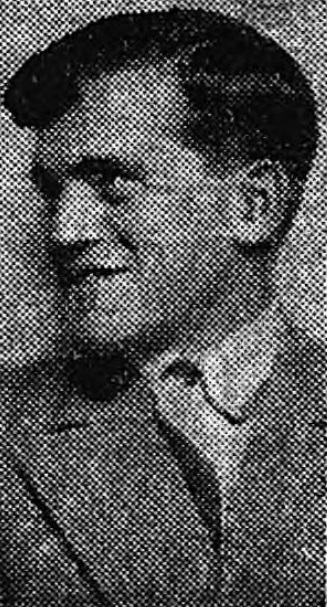
René Château (1906-1970), Member of Parliament for Charente-Inférieure, on the front page of the Petit Journal, No. 26,849, Monday, July 20, 1936.

René Château (27 June 1906 – 5 April 1970) was a French philosopher, poet and politician.

Château was born in Mouthiers-sur-Boëme. He represented the Radical-Socialist Party Camille Pelletan in the Chamber of Deputies from 1936 to 1940. In 1940 he voted in favour of granting the Cabinet presided by Marshal Philippe Pétain authority to draw up a new constitution, thereby effectively ending the French Third Republic and establishing Vichy France.

As a journalist, he worked with Marcel Déat and became editor of La France socialiste, which he used to denounce the three international institutions of "capitalism, bolshevism and Jewishness". Later, he joined the National Popular Rally (RNP), from which he was expelled in 1943. In 1944 he was arrested and imprisoned as a Nazi collaborator, first by the "francs-tireurs" and later by the forces of liberation. He later wrote an account of his captivity called L'Âge de Caïn (1947), published under the pseudonym of Jean-Pierre Abel.
