= Simon Sabiani =

French businessman and politician (1888–1956)

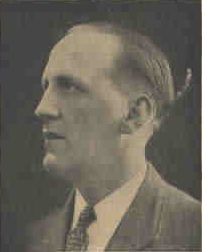
- Born: 14 May 1888; Casamaccioli, Haute-Corse, France
- Died: 29 September 1956 (aged 68); Barcelona, Spain
- Occupation: Politician

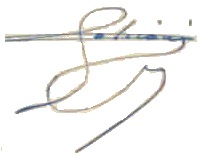
Signature

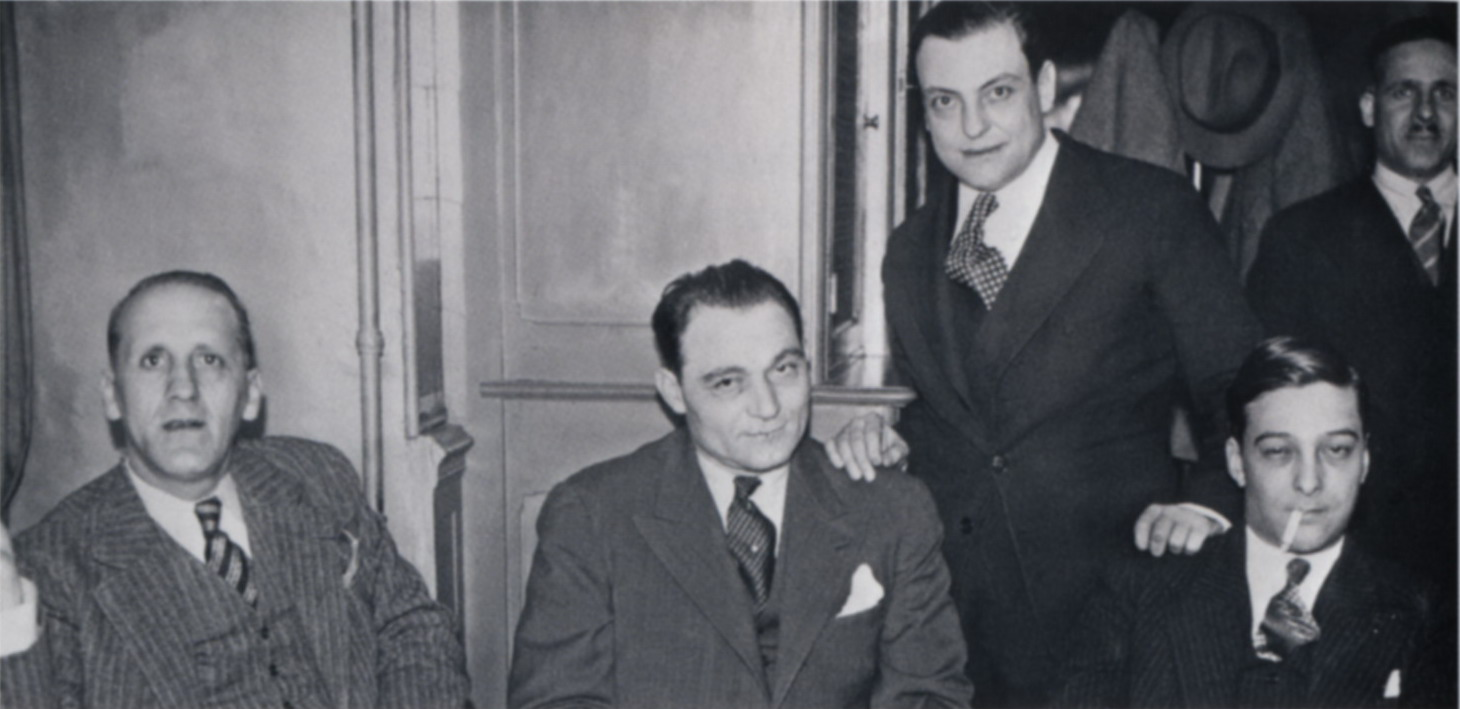
Simon Sabiani, Paul Carbone, François Spirito

Simon Pierre Sabiani (14 May 1888 – 29 September 1956) was a French businessman and politician. He served as a member of the Chamber of Deputies from 1928 to 1936.

== Early life ==
Simon Pierre Sabiani was born in 1888 in Casamaccioli, Corsica, France. He had four brothers and one sister. He moved to Marseille.

Sabiani served in World War I within the XVth corps of the 112th regiment of line infantry. He was nicknamed the "Pierre de Bayard Corse" (Corsican war hero) and awarded the Legion of Honour and the Croix de Guerre for his service.

== Career ==
Sabiani joined the SFIO in 1919, and for a while the PCF. In 1923, he founded the "Parti d’action socialiste", (Socialist action party). In 1925, he was elected to the General Council of Bouches-du-Rhône. Among his friends and "electoral agents" were the French mafiosi Paul Carbone, François Spirito, as well as Antoine Guérini, who had helped him get into the mayor's office of Marseille in 1929.

From 1928 to 1936, he served as a member of the Chamber of Deputies, representing Bouches-du-Rhône, succeeded by François Billoux. From 1929 to 1935 he served as an advisor to the Deputy Mayor of Marseille.

In 1936, he joined the Parti Populaire Français (PPF) led by Jacques Doriot, where he became a member of the political bureau, heading the local PPF section. On 4 July 1936 he addressed a right-wing faction during a demonstration in Aix-en-Provence which turned violent.

During World War II, he was the general secretary of the Marseille Bureau of the Légion des Volontaires Français, a collaborator of the Vichy regime. On 5 August 1942 he was arrested alongside Paul Carbone in Marseille over the possible murder of two women and the shooting of five more people during the Bastille Day march a month earlier. Meanwhile, he acted as an informant to the Gestapo throughout the war.

Shortly after the war, members of the French resistance put him on a list of collaborators they wanted to kill. However, he went missing. He exiled himself to Sigmaringen, in Southern Germany, then Italy, Argentina, and finally to Spain under the name of Pedro Multedo. However, he returned to Corsica clandestinely to visit his mother when she turned almost one hundred years old.

== Death ==
Sabiani died in 1956 in Barcelona, Spain. He was buried in the family chapel of Casamacciuli.

== Works ==
- Simon Sabiani, La Vérité sur l'attentat de Marseille, Grandes Conférences des Ambassadeurs, 1934
- Simon Sabiani, Colère du peuple, Les Œuvres Françaises, 1936 (préface de Jacques Doriot)
