= François Spirito =

Italian-French gangster (1898–1967)

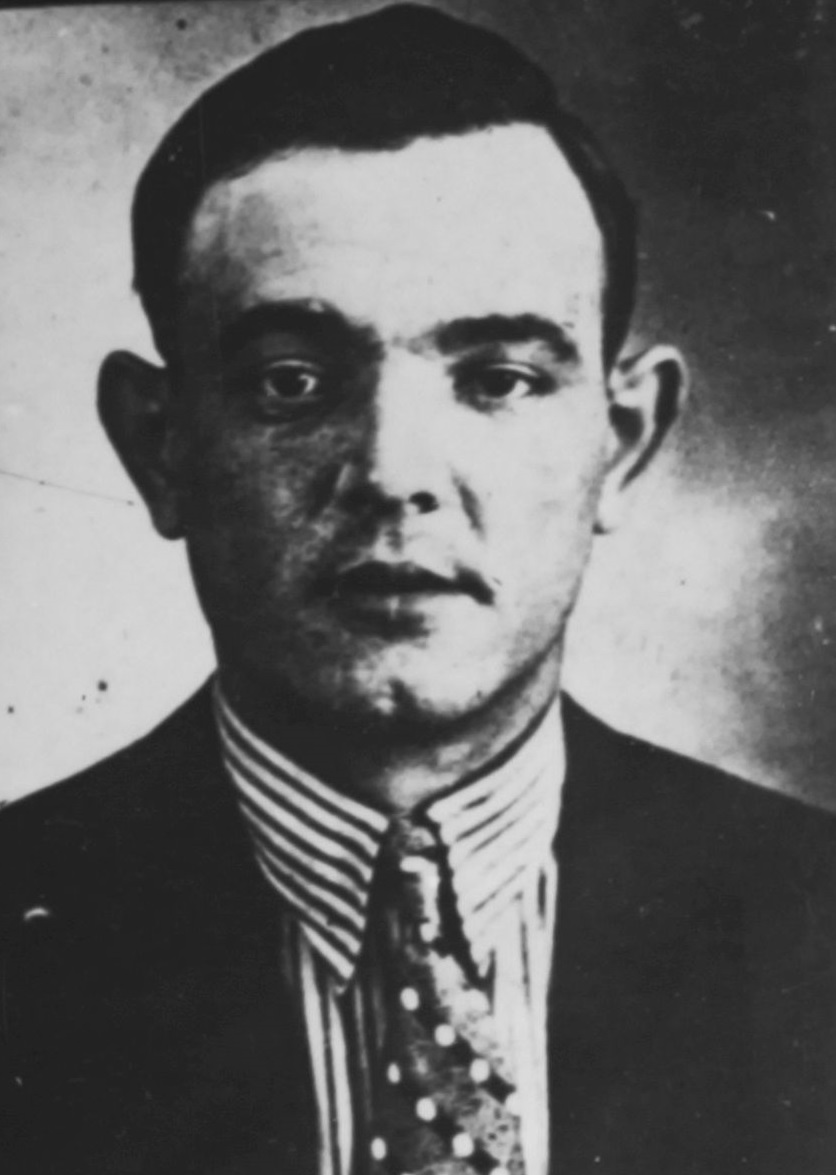
- François Spirito circa 1934
- Born: 23 January 1900; Marseille, France
- Died: 9 October 1967 (aged 67); Toulon, France
- Occupation: Criminal
- Parent(s): Dominick Spirito; Rosina De Nola

François "Lydro" Spirito (23 January 1900 – 9 October 1967) was a French gangster. He was one of the leaders of the French Connection, and inspired the film Borsalino, which featured Alain Delon and Jean-Paul Belmondo.

== Early life ==
Spirito was born in Marseille on 23 January 1900 to Dominick Spirito and Rosina De Nola. By the age of 12 he already had a police record for theft. When he was 13 he moved into his own flat and adopted the French name François. He was part of a juvenile gang that terrorised and stole around the docks. When Spirito was 15 he started working for a gangster called Antoine la Rocca, and got involved in armed robbery and the white slave trade.

In 1913, whilst in Alexandria, Egypt, part of la Rocca's network that brought women from Paris to work in Egyptian brothels, Spirito rescued Paul Carbone. Three rival pimps had kidnapped Carbone and left him buried up to his neck in sand in the desert. Spirito and Carbone struck up a life-long friendship and business partnership.

Once recovered from his ordeal, Carbone wanted to leave Egypt, and persuaded Spirito to go to Shanghai with him. Here the pair got involved in opium smuggling. This lasted for about a year until the outbreak of WW1, when the pair returned to France to enlist.

== Inter-war years ==
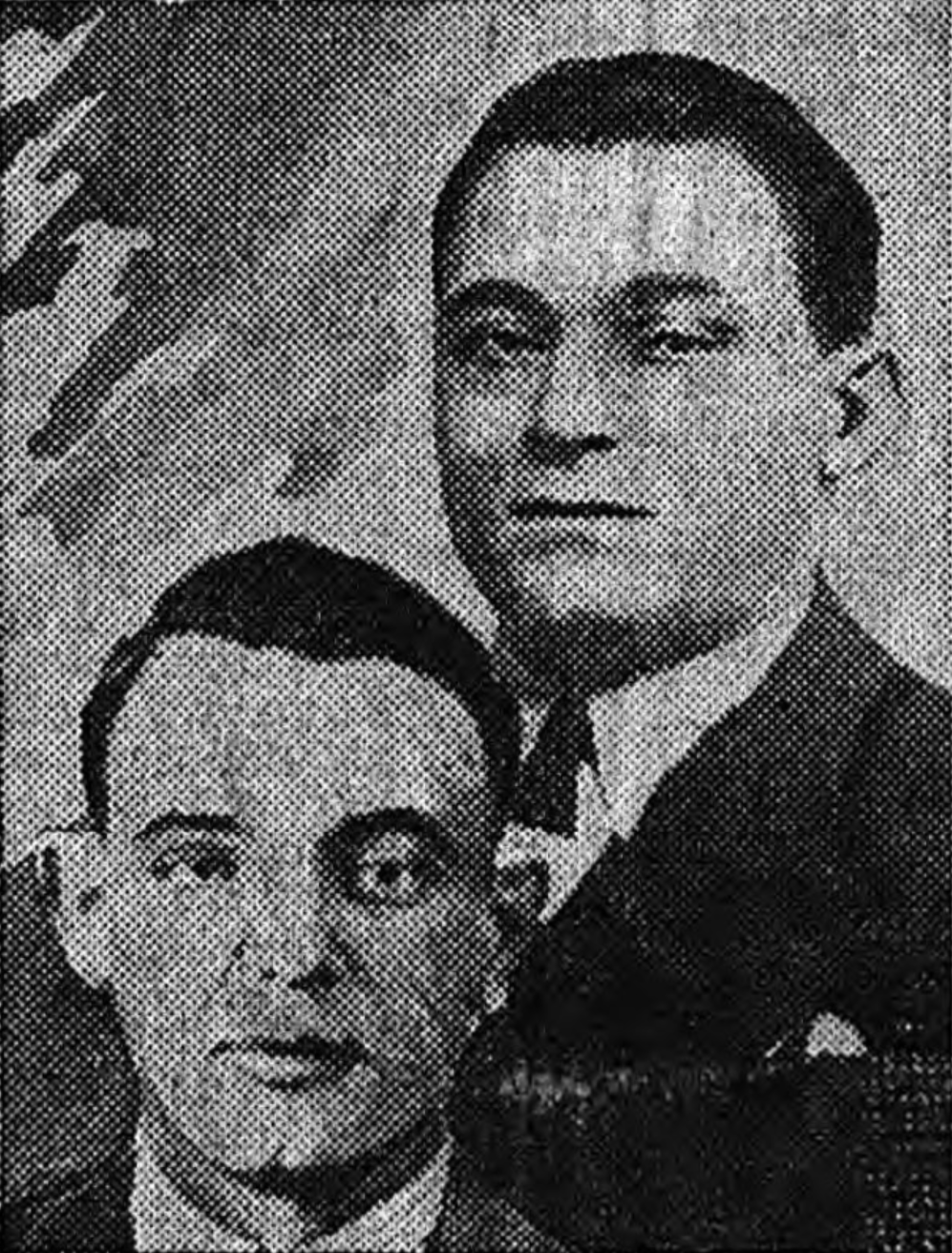
Paul Carbone (top) and François Spirito

After the end of the war, Carbone and Spirito left for South America. In Peru they started pimping and soon had 20 women working for them. The pair returned to Marseille in 1919, where they engaged in pimping and opium smuggling.

The Carbone-Spirito clan gained more and more influence in the Marseille underworld. By the late 1920s they were involved in prostitution, the white slave trade, protection rackets and various forms of trafficking. They were involved in drug trafficking, especially heroin and cocaine. They set up a laboratory in Bandol, near Marseille to refine the raw opium from Egypt, Turkey and Indochina into heroin, some of which was sent to Lucky Luciano in the United States. They owned a bar in rue pavilion, the Amical Bar, and the Beauvau restaurant in rue Beauvau. Their empire was run from these establishments. In Marseille alone they had more than 25 brothels, mostly staffed by young Jewish women forced into prostitution.

Carbone and Spirito were also active in Paris, where the Prefect of Police, Jean Chiappe, was a friend of Carbone. They initially set up an up-market brothel in Montmartre. At this time all the brothels in Paris were controlled by an obese Italian, Charles Codebo. Carbone and Spirito couldn't get him to lose weight so they muscled-in on his operation. With the money made in Paris they opened brothels all over France, staffing them with women from Europe and South America.

During the inter-war period, Carbone and Spirito allied themselves with the mayor of Marseilles, Simon Sabiani, and acted as his enforcers, and in return received political protection. When Carbone and Spirito were arrested for the murder of financial consultant Albert Prince in 1934, Sabiani came to their aid.

== World War II ==
During World War II, Carbone and Spirito joined the Carlingue which collaborated with the Germans in France; in return, the local civilian authorities in Marseilles were expected to ignore their criminal activities. They also profiteered from black marketeering, supplying German soldiers with hard to obtain goods.

Carbone died on 16 December 1943 in a train crash caused by the resistance sabotaging the train. Spirito carried on the clan's affairs. After the French Liberation, Spirito fled to Spain and thence to South America.

== Post-WWII ==
In 1946, Spirito moved to Montreal. From here he organised smuggling heroin shipments into New York. The distribution in New York was handled by the Lucchese Crime Family.

Spirito was arrested in New York on 23 August 1951, on suspicion of drug smuggling. Whilst he was in custody, on 24 October, the French Court of Appeal found him guilty, in his absence, of theft and sentenced him to 20 years of hard labour. The French authorities requested his extradition on November 15 of that year. In February 1952, a federal court in New York sentenced Spirito to two years in prison on drug trafficking charges. At the end of 1953, soon after his release from prison, Spirito was deported from the U.S. to France for entering the country illegally.

Spirito died on 9 October 1967 in Toulon, France.

== Bibliography ==
- Ambroise-Rendu, Anne-Claude (2013). "SPIRITO François". In Blanc-Chaléard, Marie-Claude; Ory, Pascal (eds.). Dictionnaire des étrangers qui ont fait la France (in French). Paris: Robert Laffont. ISBN 9782221113165. OCLC 862941638.
- Albarelli, H. P. (2009). A Terrible Mistake: The Murder of Frank Olson and the CIA's Secret Cold War Experiments. Trine Day. ISBN 9780984185887.
- Block, Alan A. (1994). Space, Time, and Organized Crime. Transaction Publishers. ISBN 9781412834926.
- Buisson, Patrick (2009). 1940–1945 Années érotiques: De la Grande Prostituée à la revanche des mâles (in French). Albin Michel. ISBN 9782226200143.
- Cockburn, Alexander; Clair, Jeffrey St (1998). Whiteout: The CIA, Drugs, and the Press. Verso. p. 139. ISBN 9781859841396. "Paul Carbone."
- Garrett, Martin (2006). Provence: A Cultural History. Oxford University Press. ISBN 9780195309577.
- Gingeras, Ryan (2014). Heroin, Organized Crime, and the Making of Modern Turkey. Oxford University Press. ISBN 9780198716020.
- Kitson, Simon (2014). Police and Politics in Marseille, 1936–1945. BRILL. ISBN 9789004265233.
- Levendel, Isaac; Weisz, Bernard (2011). Hunting Down the Jews: Vichy, the Nazis and Mafia Collaborators in Provence, 1942–1944. Enigma Books. ISBN 9781936274321.
- Newsday (1974). The Heroin Trail. Holt, Rinehart and Winston. ISBN 9780030138416.
- Rovner, Eduardo Sáenz (2008). The Cuban Connection: Drug Trafficking, Smuggling, and Gambling in Cuba from the 1920s to the Revolution. Univ of North Carolina Press. ISBN 9780807831755.
