= Jeunesse Populaire Française =

Youth wing of the fascist French Popular Party

French Popular Youth
- Jeunesse Populaire Française
- Other name: l'Union de la Jeunesse Populaire Française
- Leader: Jacques Doriot
- Dates active: October 1941–February 1945
- Country: Vichy France
- Ideology: Fascism
- Status: Defunct
- Part of: French Popular Party

Jeunesse Populaire Française (JPF, English: French Popular Youth) was a fascist youth movement created by Jacques Doriot and connected to his Parti Populaire Français. They wore a blue uniform. They are remembered for their fights with zazous and Jews and shaving heads of zazous.

It was established in October 1941 under the name l'Union de la Jeunesse Populaire Française (L'UJPF, The Union Of The French Popular Youth) and renamed to JPF in May 1942 when it merged with other smaller youth organizations.

Doriot was its honorary president, the actual one being Roger Vauquelin des Yveteaux (real name: des Yvetots).

== See also ==
- French Popular Party
