= Bresles =

- Commune
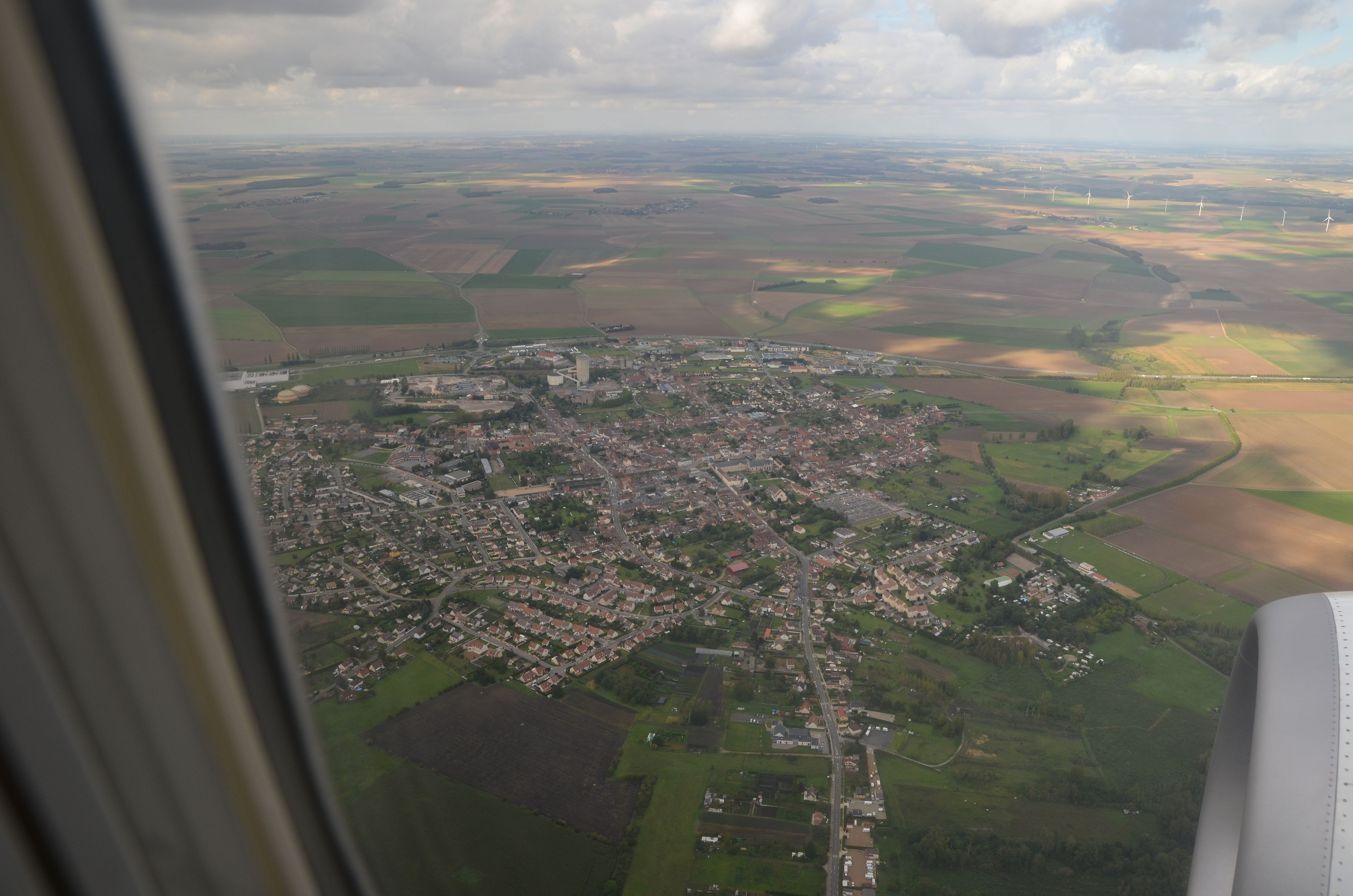
- An aerial view of Bresles
- Location of Bresles
- Location within France Location within Hauts-de-France
- Coordinates: 49°24′40″N 2°15′06″E
- Country: France
- Region: Hauts-de-France
- Department: Oise
- Arrondissement: Beauvais
- Canton: Mouy
- Intercommunality: CA Beauvaisis

Government
  - Mayor (2020–2026): Dominique Cordier
- Area^{1}: 20.99 km^{2} (8.10 sq mi)
- Elevation: 63 m (207 ft)
- Highest elevation: 107 m (351 ft)
- Lowest elevation: 47 m (154 ft)
- Population (2023): 4,029
  - Density: 191.9/km^{2} (497.1/sq mi)
- Time zone: UTC+01:00 (CET)
  - Summer (DST): UTC+02:00 (CEST)
- INSEE/Postal code: 60103 /60510
- ^{1} French Land Register data, which excludes lakes, ponds, glaciers > 1 km^{2} (0.386 sq mi or 247 acres) and river estuaries.

Bresles (French pronunciation: [bʁɛl]) is a commune in the Oise department in northern France.

== Geography ==
Bresles is about 88 km (55 mi) north of Paris, and just under 15 km east of Beauvais.

== History ==
Its existence is attested since 1262 and the chapel of St Peter and St Paul, dating from 1312, is all that is left of a fort founded in 1212. The web page created by the Oise department (see freeoise.free.fr) mentions a famous nineteenth century opera singer by the name of Nicolas Levasseur as a significant native of Bresles, but does not mention the much more notorious French fascist leader Jacques Doriot.

== Population ==
Historical population

Year	Pop.	±% p.a.
1793	1,320	—
1821	1,543	+0.56%
1846	1,803	+0.62%
1872	1,966	+0.33%
1901	2,224	+0.43%
1926	2,157	−0.12%
1946	2,140	−0.04%
1962	2,695	+1.45%
1968	2,975	+1.66%

Year	Pop.	±% p.a.
1975	3,195	+1.02%
1982	3,180	−0.07%
1990	3,653	+1.75%
1999	3,749	+0.29%
2007	4,120	+1.19%
2012	4,341	+1.05%
2017	4,147	−0.91%
2023	4,029	−0.48%

Source: EHESS and INSEE (1968-2023)

== See also ==
- Communes of the Oise department
