= Sili =

Sili may refer to:

- Sili Province, a province of ancient China
- Sili, Samoa, a village in Samoa
- Sili (Olosega), a village in American Samoa
- Sili, the Welsh name of the following places in Wales:
  - Sully, Vale of Glamorgan, a village
  - Sully Island
- Sili Bank, a Chinese company

== People with the name ==
- Liang Sili (1924–2016), Chinese rocket scientist
- Wei Sili (654–719), official of the Tang Dynasty

== See also ==
- Silly (disambiguation)
- Silli block, in India
