= Philip Rees =

British librarian and writer

Philip Rees (born 1941) is a British writer and librarian formerly in charge of acquisitions at the J. B. Morrell Library, University of York. He has written books on fascism and the extreme right.

== Works ==
- Fascism in Britain: An Annotated Bibliography (Harvester Press; Humanities Press, 1979, ISBN 0-391-00908-7)
- Fascism and Pre-fascism in Europe, 1890-1945: A Bibliography of the Extreme Right (Harvester Press; Barnes & Noble, 1984, ISBN 0-389-20472-2)
- Biographical Dictionary of the Extreme Right Since 1890 (Simon & Schuster, 1991, ISBN 0-13-089301-3)
- Dining With Terrorists 1 January 2005 by Macmillan ISBN 9781405047166
