= Roland Silly =

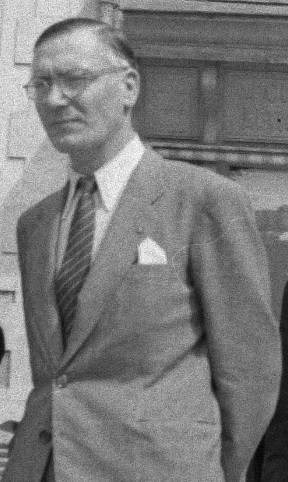

Roland Silly (1909–1995) was a French trade unionist and politician.

In the 1930s, Roland Silly was Secretary of the Federation (or section) of technicians of the CGT and member of the Socialist Party SFIO, led by Paul Faure.

During the German occupation (1940–1944), Roland Silly was a member of the Rassemblement national populaire, a collaborationist party led by Marcel Déat, and the head of the Jeunesses national-populaire, the youth movement of the party.

== Sources ==
- R. Handourtzel et C. Buffet, "La collaboration... à gauche aussi", Ed. Perrin, Paris, 1989.
- Pierre Philippe Lambert et Gérard Le Marec, "Partis et mouvements de la Collaboration", Ed. Grancher, 1993.
