= Sigmaringen enclave =

French World War II puppet government and government-in-exile

Coordinates: 48°05′16″N 9°13′01″E

French Governmental Commission for the Defense of National Interests (Note: Commission gouvernementale française pour la défense des intérêts nationaux; also known as the Délégation gouvernementale française pour la défense des intérêts français en Allemagne)
- Date formed: 6 September 1944
- Date dissolved: 23 April 1945

People and organisations
- Head of state: Philippe Pétain (officially)
- Head of government: Pierre Laval (officially)
- Deputy head of government: Fernand de Brinon
- Status in legislature: None

History
- Incoming formation: Enforced evacuation of Vichy by German forces
- Outgoing formation: Advancing Allied forces
- Predecessor: Laval government of 1942
- Successor: French occupation zone in Germany; Provisional Government of the French Republic

Location of Sigmaringen enclave

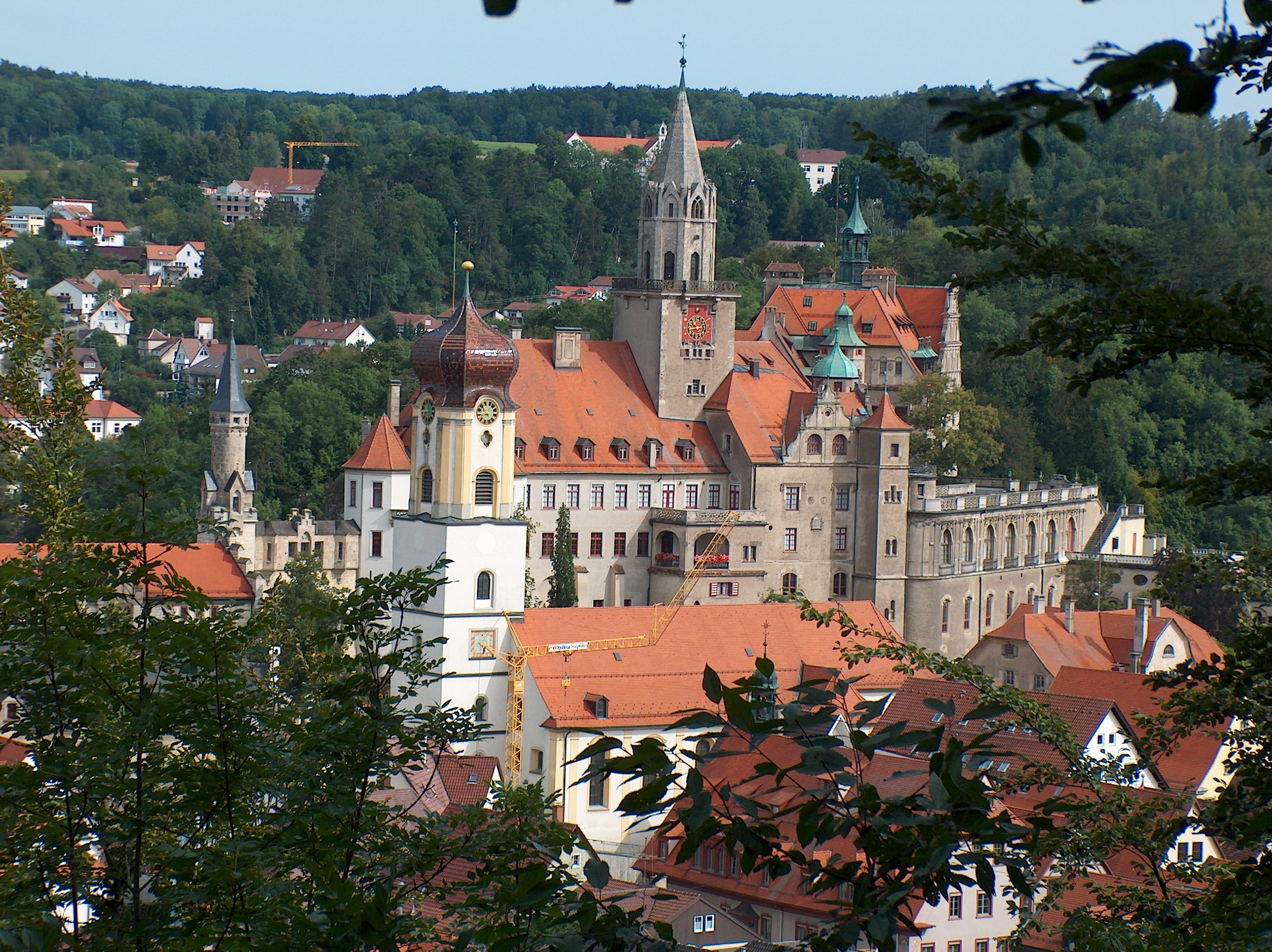
Sigmaringen Castle, from the south

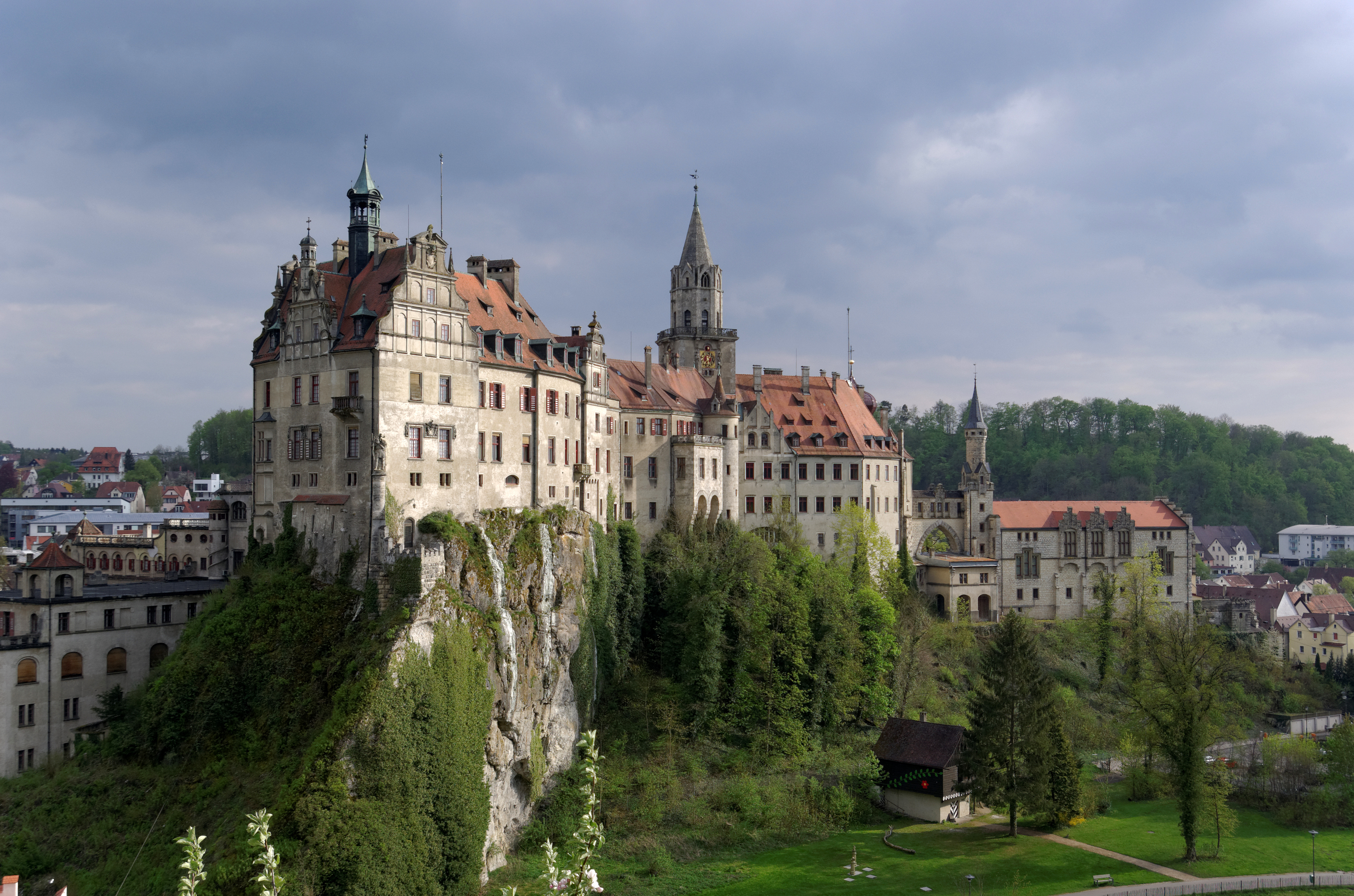
View from the north east

The Sigmaringen enclave was a puppet regime and government-in-exile formed by remnants of France's Nazi-collaborating Vichy regime during the final stages of World War II. Established in the requisitioned Sigmaringen Castle in southwestern Germany, it was created after the German military evacuated key Vichy officials, including Marshal Philippe Pétain and other collaborators, to avoid capture by advancing Allied forces. Though coerced into relocation, Pétain and ex-Prime Minister Pierre Laval refused to cooperate, leaving leadership to figures like Fernand de Brinon and Marcel Déat, who sought to maintain a semblance of legitimacy.

Designated as an extraterritorial French enclave by Nazi Germany, the commission hosted Axis embassies and operated propaganda outlets but struggled with internal dysfunction and harsh living conditions for its 6,000 residents, including soldiers, forced laborers, and prominent collaborationist writers like Louis-Ferdinand Céline. The enclave's existence ended with the Allied capture of Sigmaringen in April 1945, marking the collapse of the Vichy regime's final remnants. The enclave has been the subject of a number of cultural depictions.

== History ==
=== Background ===
Nazi Germany invaded France in May 1940 during the early part of World War II. The Armistice of 22 June 1940 ended hostilities, dividing France into two zones: an Occupied zone in the north and west, and a nominally "free zone" (Zone libre) in the south and east. Known officially as the "French State", the Zone libre became known as the "Vichy regime" for the location of its nominal capital. The regime was headed by Marshal Philippe Pétain, who was given full powers to control the regime. In November 1942, the Zone libre was also occupied by the Germans, in response to the landing of the Allies in North Africa. Vichy lost its military force, but continued to exercise jurisdiction over most of Metropolitan France until the gradual collapse of the Vichy regime following the Allied invasion in June 1944 and the ongoing liberation of France.

=== Transition ===
On 17 August 1944, Vichy's head of government and minister of foreign affairs Pierre Laval held the last government council with five of his government ministers. With permission from the Germans, he attempted to call back the prior National Assembly with the goal of giving it power and thus impeding the communists and de Gaulle. So he obtained the agreement of German ambassador Otto Abetz to bring Édouard Herriot, (President of the Chamber of Deputies) back to Paris. But ultra-collaborationists Marcel Déat and Fernand de Brinon protested to the Germans, who changed their minds and took Laval to Belfort along with the remains of his government, "to assure its legitimate security", and arrested Herriot.

Also on 17 August, Cecil von Renthe-Fink, "special diplomatic delegate of the Führer to the French Head of State", asked Pétain to allow himself to be transferred to the northern zone. Pétain refused and asked for a written formulation of this request. Von Renthe-Fink renewed his request twice on the 18th, then returned on the 19th, at 11:30, accompanied by General Alexander Neubronn von Eisenberg, who told him that he had "formal orders from Berlin". The written text is submitted to Pétain: "The Reich Government instructs that the transfer of the Head of State be carried out, even against his will". Faced with the Marshal's continued refusal, the Germans threatened to bring in the Wehrmacht to bomb Vichy. After having requested the Swiss ambassador Walter Stucki to bear witness to the Germans' blackmail, Pétain submitted. When Renthe-Fink entered the Marshal's office at the Hôtel du Parc with General von Neubronn "at 7:30 p.m.", the Head of State was supervising the packing up of his suitcases and papers. The next day, 20 August 1944, Pétain was taken against his will by the German army to Belfort and then, on 8 September to Sigmaringen in southwestern Germany, where dignitaries of his regime had taken refuge.

=== Formation ===
Hitler requisitioned the Sigmaringen Castle belonging to the Hohenzollerns in the town of Sigmaringen in Swabia, southwestern Germany. This was then occupied and used by the Vichy government-in-exile from September 1944 to April 1945. Vichy head of state Marshal Philippe Pétain was brought there against his will, and refused to cooperate, and ex-Prime Minister Pierre Laval also refused. Despite the efforts of the collaborationists and the Germans, Pétain never recognized the Sigmaringen Commission. The Germans, wanting to present a facade of legality, enlisted other Vichy officials such as Fernand de Brinon as president, along with Joseph Darnand, Jean Luchaire, Eugène Bridoux, and Marcel Déat.

On 7 September 1944, fleeing the advance of Allied troops into France, while Germany was in flames and the Vichy regime ceased to exist, a thousand French collaborators (including a hundred officials of the Vichy regime, a few hundred members of the Milice, collaborationist party militants, and the editorial staff of the newspaper Je suis partout) but also waiting-game opportunists (Note: "waiting-game opportunists": Attentistes in the original.) also went into exile in Sigmaringen.

Militia leaders sought to recruit new members to swell the ranks of the Franc-Garde by finding sympathizers, especially in the enforced labor camps of prisoners in Germany. Their goal was to promote the ideal of a true National Revolution by actively preparing for an underground struggle by creating Maquis groups. Operation Maquis blanc was designed to parachute in political agitators, who, when the time came, would sow panic and prepare future agents who would be able to infiltrate French society more easily than German agents could.

=== Legal status ===
The Castle received official designation from Germany as extraterritorialized to France and became a French enclave legally, complete with flag-raising. It was a matter of some importance to attempt to gain legal recognition for the government in exile from other countries, however at Sigmaringen, there were only the embassies of Germany and of Japan and an Italian consulate which maintained a presence. The governmental commission was thus a legally French enclave from September 1944 through April 1945.

=== Commission ===
The offices used the official title French Delegation (Délégation française) or the French Government Commission for the Defense of National Interests.

The commission had its own radio station (Radio-patrie, Ici la France) and official press (La France, Le Petit Parisien), and hosted the embassies of the Axis powers: Germany, Italy and Japan. The population of the enclave was about 6,000, including known collaborationist journalists, the writers Louis-Ferdinand Céline and Lucien Rebatet, the actor Robert Le Vigan, and their families, as well as 500 soldiers, 700 French SS, prisoners of war and French civilian forced laborers.

=== Daily life ===
Pétain and his ministers, although "on strike", were lodged in the requisitioned Sigmaringen castle. Pétain chose a suite that was not too big, as it was less cold. The rest of the enclave was lodged in schools and gymnasiums converted to dormitories, in scarce rooms in private residences or in hotels such as the Bären or the Löwen which were mostly reserved for more distinguished guests, notably the novelist Louis-Ferdinand Céline, who wrote about the experience in his 1957 book Castle to Castle. Céline describes at length the Löwen Brasserie where the French gathered to follow the news of the approaching Allied armies and to talk about the latest rumors about the imminent, albeit improbable, German victory in the war.

New arrivals lived with difficulty in the cramped dwellings of the city under the rumblings of American bombs in the summer, but it was worse during the intensely cold winter that reached −30 °C (−22 °F) in December 1944: Having left France in a panic ahead of advancing Allied forces, they arrived exclusively with summer clothing, and suffered from the cold. Inadequate housing, insufficient food, promiscuity among the paramilitaries, and lack of hygiene facilitated the spread of numerous illnesses, including flu and tuberculosis, and a high mortality rate among children; ailments that were treated as best they could by the only two French doctors, Doctor Destouches (Céline's real-life surname) and Bernard Ménétrel.

=== Dissolution ===
On 21 April 1945 General de Lattre ordered his forces to take Sigmaringen. The end came within days. By the 26th, Pétain was captured after voluntarily returning to France, and Laval had fled to Spain. Brinon, Luchaire, and Darnand were captured, tried, and executed by 1947. Other members escaped to Italy or Spain.

== Exiles ==
Exiles included the unwilling Pétain and Laval, the Commission members, as well as several thousand other collaborators or those sympathetic to the Nazis. Some prominent residents of the enclave include:

- Abel Bonnard
- Maud de Belleroche
- Jean Bichelonne
- Victor Barthélemy
- Louis-Ferdinand Céline
- Victor Debeney
- Lucette Destouches
- Roland Gaucher
- Jacques Bouly de Lesdain
- Robert Le Vigan
- Corinne Luchaire
- Bernard Ménétrel
- Georges Oltramare
- Lucien Rebatet
- Simon Sabiani

== Filmography ==
Several documentaries or fictionalized documentaries have been released about the Sigmaringen enclave. These include:

- Sigmaringen, l'ultime trahison [Sigmaringen, the ultimate betrayal] – a documentary by Rachel Kahn and Laurent Perrin, 1996, 56 min. (VHS).
- The darkness – terminus Sigmaringen [Die Finsternis, Germany, 2005] – a documentary by Thomas Tielsch, after the novel by Louis-Ferdinand Céline, K-Films, 2006, 82 min. (DVD).
- Sigmaringen, the last refuge – documentary-fiction by Serge Moati, Arte France, 2015, 78 min.

== See also ==
- Collaboration with the Axis Powers during World War II
- Épuration légale
- Foreign relations of Vichy France
- France–Germany border
- Free France
- French prisoners of war in World War II
- French Resistance
- German occupation of France
- Government of Vichy France
- Italian occupation of France during World War II
- Military history of France during World War II
  - Case Anton
  - Liberation of France
  - Liberation of Paris
  - Operation Attila
  - Operation Dragoon
- Provisional Government of the French Republic
- Pursuit of Nazi collaborators
- Zone libre

== Works cited ==
- Aron, Robert (1962). "Pétain : sa carrière, son procès" [Pétain: his career, his trial]. Grands dossiers de l'histoire contemporaine [Major issues in contemporary history] (in French). Paris: Librairie Académique Perrin. OCLC 1356008.
- Béglé, Jérôme (20 January 2014). "Rentrée littéraire - Avec Pierre Assouline, Sigmaringen, c'est la vie de château !" [Autumn publishing season launch - With Pierre Assouline, Sigmaringen, That's life in the castle]. Le Point (in French). Le Point Communications.
- Brissaud, André (1965), La Dernière année de Vichy (1943-1944) [The Last Year of Vichy] (in French), Paris: Librairie Académique Perrin, OCLC 406974043
- Cointet, Jean-Paul (2014). Sigmaringen. Tempus (in French). Paris: Perrin. ISBN 978-2-262-03300-2.
- Jäckel, Eberhard (1968) [1st pub. 1966: Deutsche Verlag-Anstalg GmbH (in German) as "Frankreich in Hitlers Europa – Die deutsche Frankreichpolitik im Zweiten Weltkrieg"]. La France dans l'Europe de Hitler [France in Hitler's Europe - Germany's France foreign policy in the Second World War]. Les grandes études contemporaines (in French). Paris: Fayard.
- Jackson, Julian (2001). France: The Dark Years, 1940–1944. Oxford University Press. ISBN 978-0-19-820706-1.
- Joseph, Gilbert (2002). Fernand de Brinon, l'aristocrate de la collaboration. Paris: Albin Michel. ISBN 978-2-226-11695-6. OCLC 1140347692. "It was essential to confer upon the governmental Commission an institutional foundation recognized by some countries. However, at Sigmaringen, only the embassies of Germany and of Japan maintained a presence."
- Kupferman, Fred (2006) [1st pub: Balland (1987)]. Laval (in French) (2 ed.). Paris: Tallandier. ISBN 978-2-84734-254-3.
- Lottman, Herbert R. (1985). Pétain, Hero Or Traitor: The Untold Story. New York: W. Morrow. ISBN 978-0-688-03756-7. OCLC 11840938. "The Germans granted the commission extraterritoriality, this to be marked by the flag - raising already mentioned."
- Paxton, Robert O. (1997) [1st pub: 1972: Knopf (in English) as "Vichy France: old guard and new order, 1940-1944" (978-0394-47360-4)], La France de Vichy – 1940-1944, Points-Histoire (in French), translated by Bertrand, Claude, Paris: Éditions du Seuil, ISBN 978-2-02-039210-5
- Rousso, Henry (1999). Pétain et la fin de la collaboration : Sigmaringen, 1944-1945 [Pétain and the end of collaboration: Sigmaringen, 1944-1945] (in French). Paris: Éditions Complexe. ISBN 2-87027-138-7.
- Sautermeister, Christine (6 February 2013). Louis-Ferdinand Céline à Sigmaringen : réalité et fiction dans "D'un château l'autre. Ecriture. ISBN 978-2-35905-098-1. OCLC 944523109. "De septembre 1944 jusque fin avril 1945, Sigmaringen constitue donc une enclave française. Le drapeau français est hissé devant le château. Deux ambassades et un consulat en cautionnent la légitimité : l'Allemagne, le Japon et l'Italie."
- Schneider, Rolf (4 September 2007). "Das ganze Schloss ein Blendwerk - Vichy in Sigmaringen" [The Entire Castle an Illusion - Vichy in Sigmaringen] (radio broadcast transcript) (in German). Deutschlandfunk. Archived from the original on 3 February 2017.
