= Jacques Doriot =

French journalist, communist, later fascist politician (1898–1945)

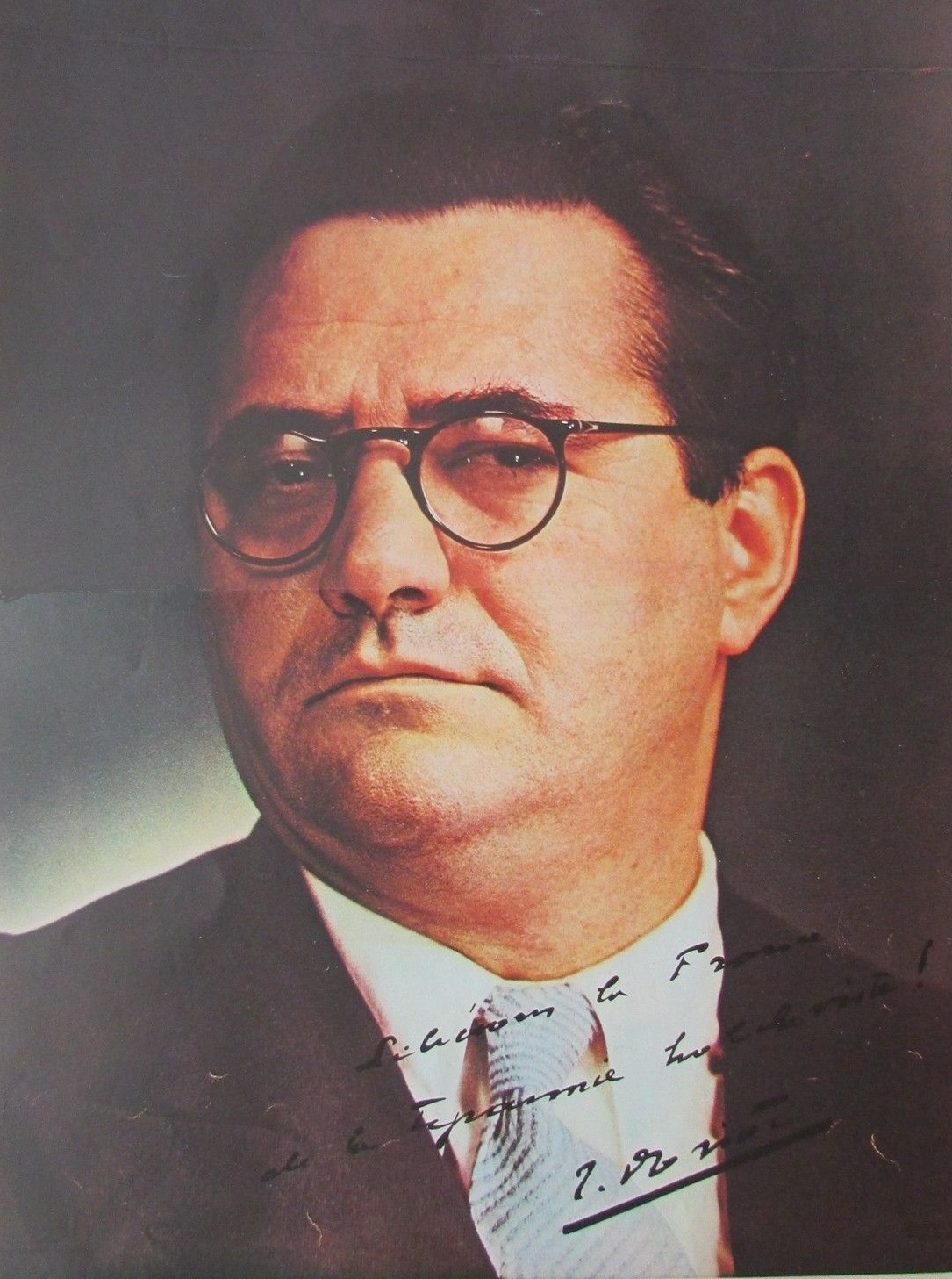
- Picture of Doriot during the occupation, 1941

Leader of the French Popular Party
- In office 28 June 1936 – 22 February 1945
- Preceded by: Position established
- Succeeded by: Christian Lesueur

Mayor of Saint-Denis
- In office 1 February 1931 – 25 May 1937
- Preceded by: Gaston Venet
- Succeeded by: Fernand Grenier

Personal details
- Born: 26 September 1898 Bresles, Oise, France
- Died: 22 February 1945 (aged 46) Mengen, Württemberg, Germany
- Cause of death: Air attack
- Resting place: Mengen, Germany
- Party: French Communist Party (1928–1934); Independent (1934–1936); French Popular Party (1936–1945)
- Spouse: Madeleine Claire Raffinot
- Occupation: Politician

Military service
- Allegiance: France; Germany
- Branch/service: French Army (1916); Wehrmacht (1941) (Schutzstaffel) Waffen-SS (1944)
- Years of service: 1916–1918 (French Third Republic); 1941–1944 (Nazi Germany)
- Rank: Oberleutnant (Wehrmacht); Sturmbannführer (Waffen-SS)
- Unit: Legion of French Volunteers Against Bolshevism
- Battles/wars: First World War; Second World War
- Awards: Croix de Guerre; Iron Cross Second Class; War Merit Cross Second Class; Eastern Front Medal

Jacques Maurice Doriot (French: [ʒak dɔʁjo]; 26 September 1898 – 22 February 1945) was a French politician, initially communist and later fascist, before and during World War II. In 1936, after his exclusion from the French Communist Party, he founded the French Popular Party (PPF) and took over the newspaper La Liberté, which took a stand against the Popular Front. During the war, Doriot was a radical supporter of collaboration and contributed to the creation of the Legion of French Volunteers against Bolshevism (LVF). He fought personally in German uniform on the Eastern Front, with the rank of lieutenant.

== Early life and politics ==
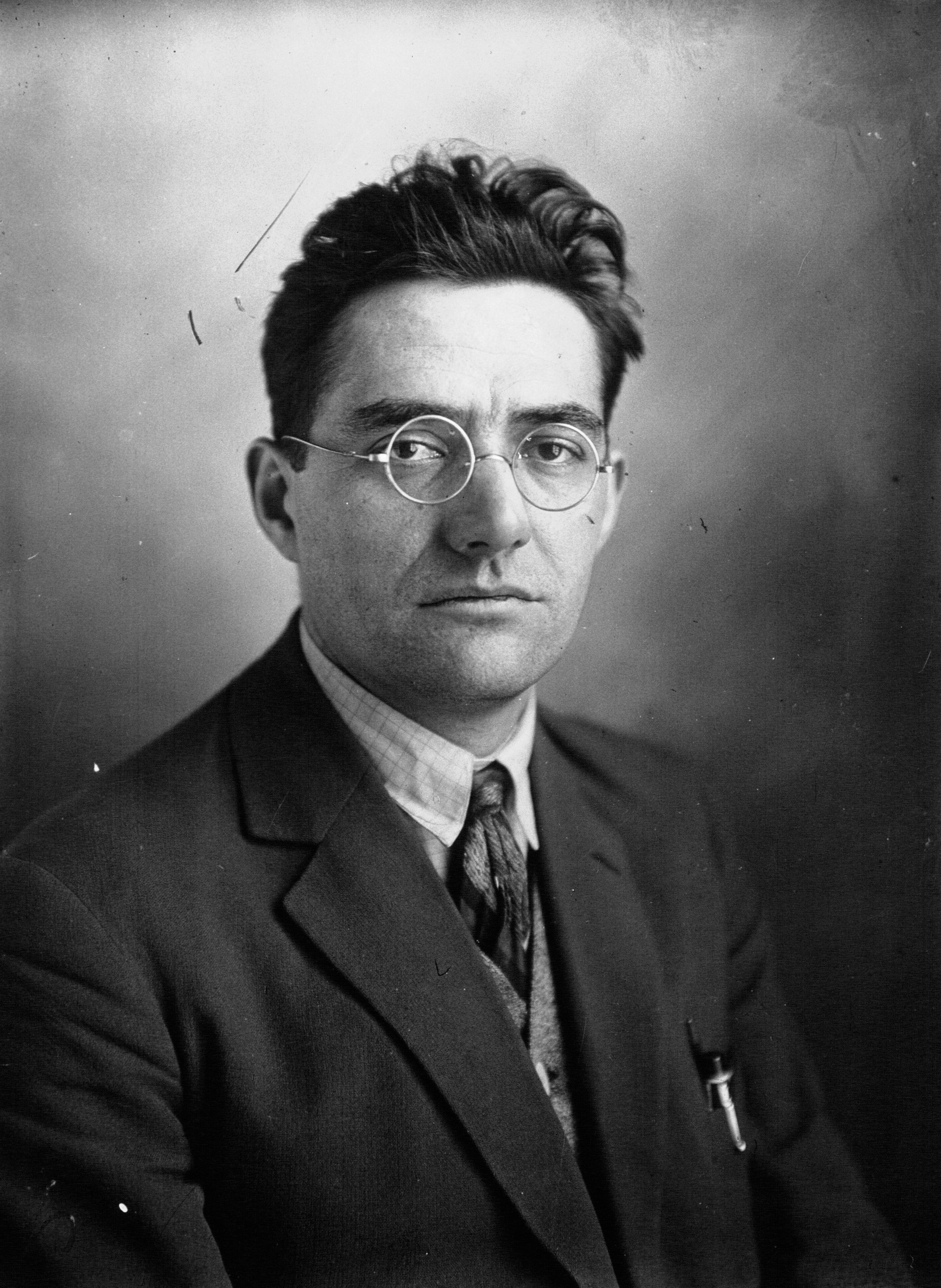
Doriot in 1929

Doriot was born on 26 September 1898 in Bresles, Oise, France to Georges Octave and Augustine Diéraert. He moved to Saint Denis, near Paris, at an early age and became a labourer. In 1916, in the midst of World War I, he became a committed socialist, but his political activity was halted by his joining the French Army in 1917. Participating in active combat during World War I, Doriot was captured by enemy troops and remained a prisoner of war until 1918. For his wartime service, especially for rescuing a fellow wounded soldier from no-mans-land, Doriot was awarded the Croix de guerre.

After being released, he returned to France and in 1920 joined the French Communist Party (PCF), quickly rising through the party. Within a few years, he had become one of the PCF's major leaders. In 1922 he became a member of the Presidium of the Executive Committee of the Comintern, and a year later was made Secretary of the French Federation of Young Communists.

In 1923, Doriot was arrested for violently protesting French occupation of the Ruhr Area. He was released a year later, upon being elected to the French Chamber of Deputies (the Third Republic equivalent of the National Assembly) by the people of Saint Denis.

== Fascism ==
In 1931, Doriot was elected mayor of Saint Denis. Around this time, he opposed the "social fascism" theory and came to advocate a Popular Front alliance between the Communists and other French socialist parties with whom Doriot sympathized on a number of issues and worried that exclusion would alienate valuable political allies. Although this would soon become official Communist Party policy, at the time it was seen as heretical and Doriot was expelled from the Communist Party in 1934. This expulsion provoked a great sadness in Doriot, but above all a great anger and a thirst for revenge against the PCF leadership.

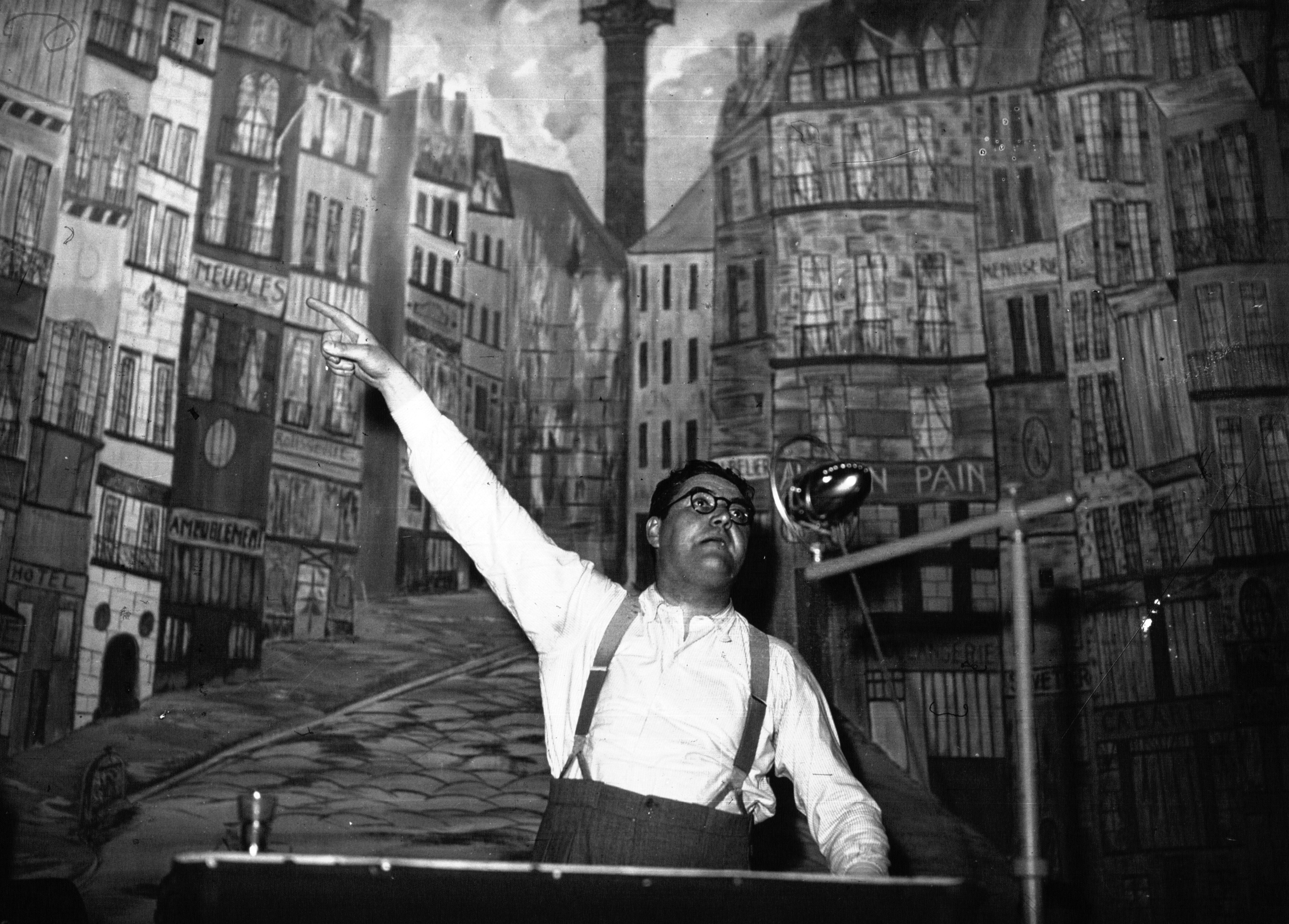
Doriot speaking at the first meeting of the French Popular Party, 1936

Still a member of the Chamber of Deputies, Doriot struck back at the Communists who had renounced him: now bitter towards the Comintern, his views turned to embrace the French nation, evolving into a national socialism—as opposed to the socialism of the Third International. By now embodying fascist more than socialist ideals, Doriot founded the ultra-nationalist Parti Populaire Français (PPF) in 1936. Doriot and his ultra-nationalist supporters were vocal advocates of France becoming organized along the lines of Fascist Italy and Nazi Germany and were bitter opponents of Socialist Premier Léon Blum and his Popular Front coalition.

== Collaboration ==
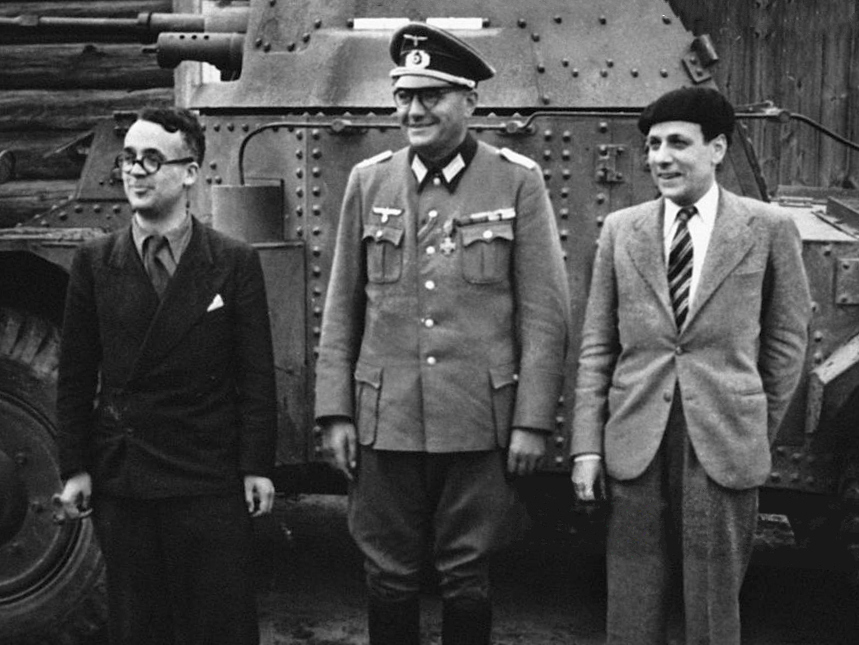
Robert Brasillach, Jacques Doriot and Claude Jeantet photographed on the Eastern Front, 1943

When France went to war with Germany in 1939, Doriot was mobilized and fought at the front as a sergeant. After the armistice in June 1940, he was demobilized. He became a staunch pro-German and supported Germany's occupation of northern France in 1940, specifically due to Hitler's anti-Bolshevik policy. Doriot resided in collaborationist Vichy France for a time and was made a member of the National Council of Vichy France in January 1941, but he eventually found that the Vichy regime was not nearly as Fascist as he had hoped it would be and moved to occupied Paris, where he espoused pro-German and anti-communist propaganda on Radio Paris. In 1941, he and fellow fascist collaborator Marcel Déat founded the Légion des Volontaires Français (LVF), a French unit of the Wehrmacht.

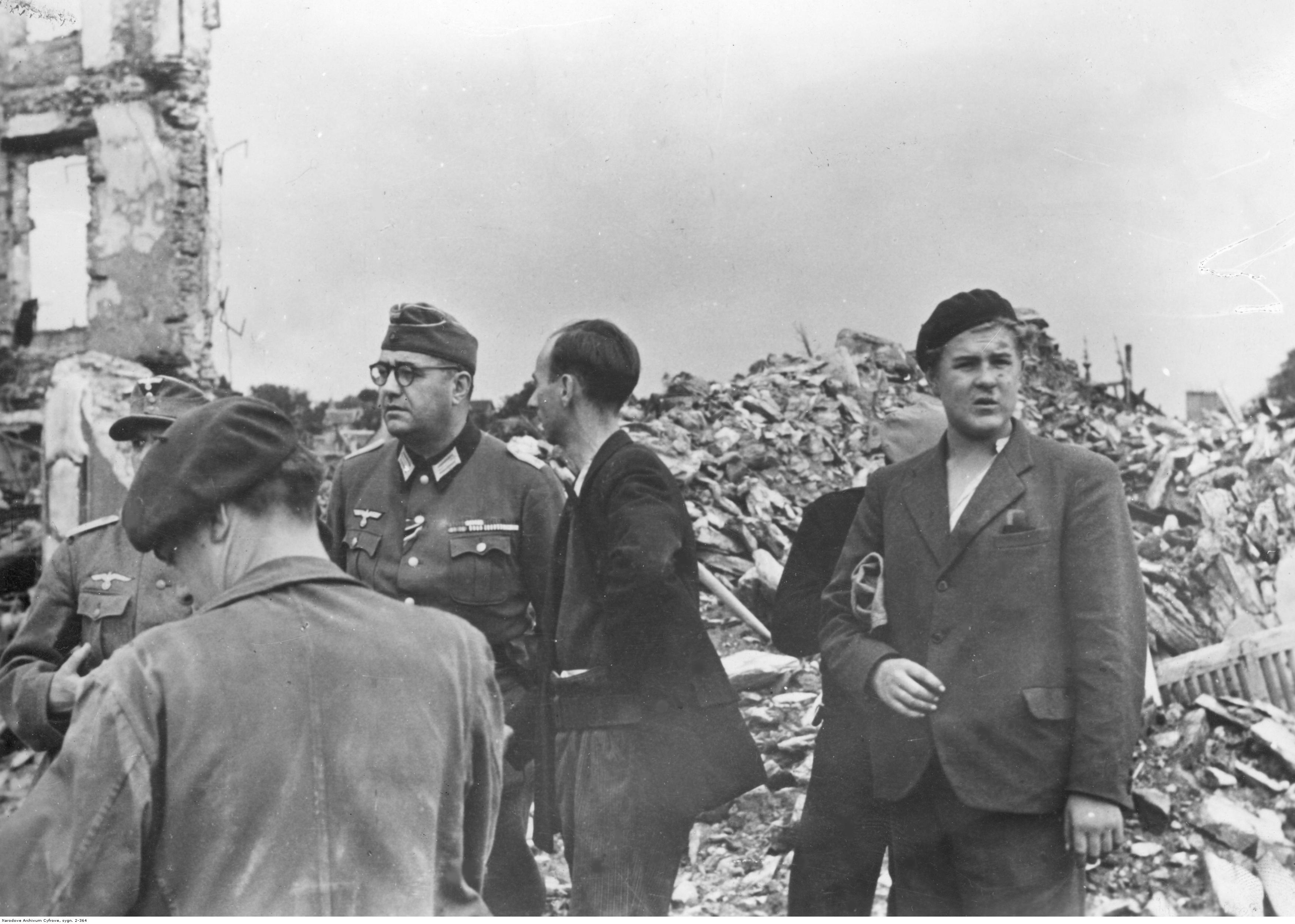
Doriot in conversation with residents of the destroyed city of Saint-Lô, July 1944.

Doriot fought with the LVF and saw active duty on the Eastern Front when Germany invaded the Soviet Union in June 1941, being awarded the Iron Cross in 1943. In his absence leadership of the PPF officially passed to a directorate, although real power came to lie with Maurice-Yvan Sicard. In December 1944, Doriot travelled to Germany and made contact with the former members of the Vichy regime and other collaborators who had gathered together in the Sigmaringen enclave. Doriot's PPF struggled to assume a leadership role within the French expatriate community, basing itself in Mainau and setting up its own radio station, Radio-Patrie, at Bad Mergentheim and publishing its own paper Le Petit Parisien. The PPF was also involved in conducting intelligence and sabotage activities by supplying some volunteers whom the Germans dropped by parachute into liberated France. He was killed on 22 February 1945 while traveling from Mainau to Sigmaringen when his car was strafed by Allied fighter planes. He was buried in Mengen.

== Family ==
Doriot married Madeleine Claire Raffinot (17 November 1896 – 3 August 1982) on 20 December 1924. The couple had twin daughters:

- Jacqueline (23 April 1929 – 20 January 2021)
- Madeleine (23 April 1929 – 10 March 2010).

Doriot also had a child with his mistress Ginette Garcia (née Dezouche).

== See also ==
- Nicola Bombacci, one of the founders of the Communist Party of Italy but later became a fascist and a supporter of the Italian Social Republic
- Chen Gongbo, one of the founders of the Chinese Communist Party but later became a supporter of the Wang Jingwei regime, a client country under Japanese imperialism
- Ernest Granger
- Marcel Déat
