= Serge de Beketch =

Serge André Yourevitch Verebrussoff de Beketch (born 12 December 1946, Tours, Indre-et-Loire, France, died 6 October 2007 Clichy, Hauts-de-Seine) was a French journalist, story writer for cartoons and writer linked to the extreme-right. He was also the co-founder of Radio Courtoisie, where he directed a Wednesday evening broadcast up until his death, and was a founder and host of the Libre Journal de la France courtoise.

== Biography ==
De Beketch was of Russian origin and from a Tatar lineage. His maternal grandfather was a colonel in the French army; his paternal grandfather was aide-de-camp to General Anton Denikin, chief of the White Armies during the Russian Civil War. De Beketch's father, a non-commissioned officer in the French foreign legion was killed in action at the Battle of Dien Bien Phu, achieving Mort pour la France status. After his schooling as an enfant de troupe (military child), de Beketch performed several jobs, including manual labour and working in a bookstore. In 1966 he started doing freelance reporting for the entertainment page of the weekly newspaper Minute. In 1967, he joined the Israeli Defence Force at the time of the Six-Day War., but "the fighting went so quickly that he didn't even have time to put on his uniform".

In 1970, de Beketch was hired by the Havas Conseil consultancy, where he took part in creating a media department. One-time freemason and member of the Grande Loge de France (then the Grande Loge nationale) he quickly distanced himself from freemasonry, as he often took the opportunity to explain. From 1969, René Goscinny had invited de Beketch to write theatre reviews for the weekly Pilote magazine. Besides this, he would write various stories in cartoon form and prepare French versions of the American offerings Eerie, Creepie and Vampirella for éditions Publicness. He also worked for the international visual arts review Zoom. In 1975, de Beketch left Pilote following the departure of Goscinny. He became head of information, then chief editor of Minute in 1979. He left Minute following a disagreement about the paper's new direction, and took on the role of editor-in-chief of National-Hebdo at the request of Jean-Marie le Pen.

In 1987, de Beketch participated with Jean Ferré in creating Radio Courtoisie after having been ousted from Radio Solidarité. He began a weekly "free news report" (Libre Journal) slot starting at three o'clock on Wednesdays, which continued until his death. In 1990, at the request of the new owner Serge Martinez, de Beketch returned to the lead editorship of Minute. In 1993 he was dismissed from his functions by the editing team who had bought back the paper from Martinez and judged that de Beketch was too politically involved. De Beketch founded his own newspaper with his wife Danièle, called Le Libre Journal de la France courtoise, which, contrary to popular belief, was not a written version of his radio show. De Beketch was a great friend of the journalist and novelist AD.G., whom he met in 1974 at Minute. A. D. G. was inspired by de Beketch to create his character Sergueï Djerbitskine, alias Machin, alcoholic journalist and anarchist.

De Beketch died from a streptococcus infection contracted in hospital while being treated for hepatitis B. He had acquired hepatitis fifteen years earlier while being treated for Hodgkin's lymphoma. His funeral in Paris was attended by more than 2,000 people including Jean-Marie Le Pen, Bruno Gollnisch, Bruno Mégret and Jean Raspail.

== Politics ==
De Beketch's family history laid the foundations for his involvement in right-wing (and later far right) politics. He preferred to be categorised as a "hard-line royalist". His views became more radical over the years; thus in 1992 in a reply to Philippe Guilhaume, the former president of the Antenne 2 and FR3 TV stations, de Beketch declared himself to be neither a democrat nor a liberal. According to Le Monde, "his puns oozed antisemitism, and he never missed an allusion to the genocide of Jews in order to put its size into context"."

De Beketch styled himself as a creationist, asserting that he didn't believe in evolution, that the world was no older than about ten thousand years and that the flood described in the bible, Noah's Ark and the tower of Babel were historical facts. De Beketch advised people to read material by the holocaust denier Robert Faurisson in order to "escape the dictats of single-mindedness" and "pickle the neurons".

In his radio broadcast, he execrated the "socialist abortion state", "the occupied territories" (by which he meant the deprived multi-cultural suburbs of French cities), "the stinking Karl Zéro and his anal-whore broadcast" (using the French phrase anal-pute, literally "anal-whore", a pun on Zéro's broadcasting station canal plus), "crappy woodlice" (referring to journalists), "imbeciles who read Libé" (referring to the left-wing newspaper, Libération), "scouts" (like Guy Bedos, Jean-Jacques Goldman) "who once wouldn't have even been given a Christian burial".

In 1995, de Beketch was communications director for the Toulon city government, which was then led by the Front National mayor Jean-Marie Le Chevallier. He resigned after four months, assessing that the incompetence of the municipal staff damaged the Front National's image. In fact, according to another official reason for his departure at the end of his short stay, he had some health problems and it was well known that his relations with Jean-Marie Le Chevallier had changed, becoming rather bad.

He was also head of the Patriote du Var. In the conflict which pitted Mégret against Le Pen between 1998 and 1999, de Beketch tried in vain to adopt a conciliatory position.

In his broadcasts, Beketch often defended medical therapies rejected by official bodies, such as those of Mirko Beljanski and Loïc Le Ribault, since he believed that his own medical conditions had been helped by them.

== Public polemics ==
On 20 November 1996 de Beketch stated on Radio Courtoisie:

In France, in 1943, they didn't treat the Jews as [badly as] they treat Front National supporters today. Of course, they arrested them [the Jews], deported them, and things went on in Germany - but in France, I don't remember there being pogroms like what people are doing to Front National supporters currently."

The positions de Beketch took earned him numerous court appearances, and several convictions. He was condemned on two counts for defamation relating to Olivier Biffaud, journalist for Le Monde. On the first count de Beketch was ordered to pay a single franc in damages and 8,000 francs court costs. On the second count, he was ordered to pay 80,000 francs in damages as well as a similar 8,000 francs in costs for "affecting the sensitivity and dignity of the person concerned."

== Involvements with groups ==
Serge de Beketch was former vice-président of AGRIF ("General alliance against racism and for the respect of French and Christian Identity") and a member until his death. He also founded the "French Jewish and Christian friendship circle" with Bernard Antony, Alain Sanders, Jean-Pierre Cohen and Pierre Semour.

In 2006, de Becketch was a signatory to "the call of the 25" a petition requesting a presidential pardon for Michel Lajoye.

De Beketch was also a staunch defender of the Riaumont children's village.

== Publications ==
=== Cartoon texts ===
- Thorkaël I. L'œil du dieu, drawings by Loro, text by Serge de Beketch, Tury Éditions SERG, Classiques de l'Âge d'or, 1976. ISBN 2-85869-018-9 ; reedited. Paris-Lausanne-Montréal, Dargaud, Pilote, 1982.
- Thorkaël II. La Porte de Taï-Matsu, drawings by Loro, text by Serge de Beketch, Tury, Éditions SERG, Classiques de l'Âge d'or 1977. ISBN 2-85869-023-5 ; reedited Paris-Lausanne-Montréal, Dargaud, Pilote, 1982. ISBN 2-205-02193-1
- Déboires d'outre-tombe I, drawings by Loro, text by Serge de Beketch, Paris, Éditions du Cygne, BD Cygne, 1981.
- Déboires d'outre-tombe II, drawings by Loro, text by Serge de Beketch, Paris, Éditions du Cygne, BD Cygne, 1982. ISBN 2-902748-10-8
- with Jacques Tardi, "Un hussard en hiver", and "La voiture maudite", two short stories in four pages for Pilote 1972

=== Essays, pamphlets and other writings ===
- with Denis Maraval and Jean Piverd, Les Grandes Découvertes archéologiques du vingtième siècle. L'Histoire arrachée à la terre, presented by Jean Dumont, research and text by Serge de Beketch, Denis Maraval, Jean Piverd, Genève, Famot, 1979.
- with Alain Sanders, La Nuit de Jericho I. La Révolte du lieutenant Poignard, Paris, Éditions des Vilains hardis, 1991. ISBN 2-9506220-0-3
- Dictionnaire de la colère, collection of chronicles published in Le Libre Journal de la France courtoise, Paris, Éditions des Vilains hardis, 2005 270
- Catalogue des nuisibles, Paris, Éditions des Vilains hardis, 2006, 190 ISBN 978-2-9528429-0-7
- Préface à Philippe Randa, Présumé coupable politique. Chroniques barbares, vol. 4, Coulommiers, Éditions Dualpha, Politiquement incorrect, 2007. ISBN 978-2-35374-024-6
- À l'appel de Dénikine, ed. Renaissance Catholique, 2007, 310 ISBN 978-2-916951-05-8 Interventions by Serge de Beketch during Renaissance Catholique, published posthumously.

=== Documentary ===
- Co-direction and commentary with Patrick Buisson and Anne Sophie Druet, Le Pen sur le front, Patrick Buisson, Paris, Édition et distribution Intervalles, 1985. Distributed on one VHS video cassette, SECAM, colour, 1hr 15mins.

== See also ==
- Le Libre Journal de la France courtoise
- Radio Courtoisie
- Minute
- Pilote magazine
- AGRIF
- Riaumont
