= Radio Courtoisie =

- Paris; France
- Broadcast area: France
- Frequencies: 95.6 (Paris); 100.6 (Caen); 104.5 (Chartres); 87.8 (Cherbourg); 101.1 (Le Havre); 98.8 (Le Mans)

Programming
- Language: French

History
- First air date: November 1987
- Call sign meaning: Radio Courtesy

Links
- Website: radiocourtoisie.fr

Radio Courtoisie (French pronunciation: [ʁadjo kuʁtwazi]; English: Radio Courtesy) is a French radio station and cultural associative union created in 1987 by Jean Ferré.

Radio Courtoisie defines itself as the "free radio of the real country referring to the pays réel concept of Charles Maurras and the francophone world", declaring itself to be "open to all people of the political right, from François Bayrou to Jean-Marie Le Pen".

== History ==
=== Radio Solidarité ===
In September 1981, Bernadette d'Angevilliers and Philippe Malaud, former minister under Charles De Gaulle and Georges Pompidou, created Radio Solidarité, with the support of Yannick Urrien. This free radio station had associations with RPR and with the UDF and was strongly opposed to the political left of François Mitterrand.

At the time, Ferré was a radio and television columnist for Figaro Magazine, of which he had been a founder with Louis Pauwels. His columns, frequently kind to Radio Solidarité, brought him to the notice of d'Angevilliers who proposed a radio collaboration with him.

In May and June 1982, Ferré created the broadcast formula of the Libre Journal: an hour and a half programme each evening based around a guest belonging to the political right. This formula would be taken up by Radio Courtoisie and extended to three hours.

Ferré proposed that the radio should be open to "all people of the right". Following this, Serge de Beketch, as many others, was invited to direct a regular Wednesday evening broadcast. However, following the 1984 European elections, his invitation brought on the radio the accusation of having helped the political breakthrough of the French National Front. De Beketch was ordered to leave; Ferré defended de Beketch and was also dismissed.

Having been taken off the air, Ferré created the "Radio Solidarité listeners' defense committee" (CDARS). It was under this name, declared to the Paris police prefecture on 12 December 1985, that he founded Radio Courtoisie (courtoisie means courtesy). Radio Courtoisie made its first broadcast on 7 November 1987.

=== Radio Courtoisie ===
From November 1987 until the end of his life, Ferré was the head of the radio station, with title "President of the editorial committee", and a full delegation of successive presidents, François Pitti-Ferrandi, Pierre Dehaye and Christian Langlois. Every Monday evening Ferré himself hosted a Libre Journal without interruption until 31 July 2006, the date of his last broadcast.

==== Disputes among the staff ====
After Ferré's death on 10 October 2006, a lively dispute pitted Henry de Lesquen, Ferré's successor as head of the station, against a group of four broadcasting patrons including Claude Reichman, who demanded that de Lesquen resign. Claude Reichman was banned from Radio Courtoisie after a broadcast on 14 November 2006, in which he attacked de Lesquen in terms that de Lesquen judged to be defamatory. He was replaced by Marie Le Méné and Benoîte Taffin. Jean-Gilles Malliarakis in turn announced he would leave the station during his broadcast of 23 February 2007, having been given notice the same morning. Malliarakis was replaced by David Mascré and Catherine Rouvier.

== The editorial policy instituted by Ferré ==
Two objectives were set out in Radio Courtoisie's file for candidacy submitted in 1986: Respecting the right of freedom of expression for all tribes within the French political right, and protecting and illustrating the French language. In practice, the editorial policy was organized relative to three axes, those of (right-wing) politics, religion (mainly traditionalist Catholicism) and culture. While a single broadcast often touched on both political and religious themes, cultural broadcasts rarely strayed into the other areas. A novelty introduced in 2007 was the introduction of a daily information programme, le Bulletin de réinformation, which lasted 15 minutes.

Radio Courtoisie has preserved its editorial freedom by eschewing any form of advertising. It is an associative union-based radio station, and listeners are regularly asked to contribute through an annual membership fee and through donations.

=== Political line ===
In his political blueprint, Ferré had desired that Radio Courtoisie would be anchored in the political right and at the same time "open to all tribes of the right", from the centre-right to the French National Front, thus linking the extreme-right with the mainstream right. Ferré often explained on air the attacks which were leveled at his radio station: for certain of its detractors, Radio Courtoisie was the radio station of Le Pen, for others, the station of Jacques Chirac. He always put to everyone his firm wish (according to him as a Poitiers native) that his radio station should be open to "all people of the right", that is, including the French National Front.

Ferré was himself a royalist and personally very anti-Gaullist. However, in a broadcast of 3 October 1991, he recalled that he had sacrificed his anti-Gaullism on the altar of reconciliation, that he had resolved for his own part never to argue in public against de Gaulle, and that, in any case, he respected some of the great Gaullists such as Alain Griotteray. As he explained in his own Libre journal of 16 April 2001, his project was to rally all patriots. On several occasions, Ferré asserted on air at Radio Courtoisie that he had wished, in accordance with his editorial line, to give full and complete freedom to his broadcasting patrons in their words and in their choice of invited guests. Christian democrats, liberals, Gaullists, nationalists and royalists were regularly heard on Radio Courtoisie.

For the most specifically political programmes, hosts such as Yannick Urrien, Paul-Marie Coûteaux, Michel de Rostolan, Benoîte Taffin, Henry de Lesquen, Martial Bild, Jacques Garello, Henri Fouquereau, Bernard Antony, Catherine Rouvier, Gérard Marin, Claude Giraud and Emmanuel Ratier were involved. Among former broadcasting patrons were Serge de Beketch (until his death in 2007), Jean-Gilles Malliarakis, Alain Paucard, Reichman, Griotteray, Commandant Pierre Guillaume and the historian Pierre Chaunu.

Many of the older broadcasters identified as maurrassiens. The incorporation of Maurras' concept of "pays réel (real country) into the Radio Courtoisie's slogan witnessed to this historical influence.

=== Religious line ===
Radio Courtoisie was not sectarian, except on Sundays, when it became so. It generally devoted much space to the Catholic religion, and specifically to traditional Catholics practicing the rite of Saint Pius V: The Society of St. Pius X, the Good Shepherd Institute, and the Priestly Fraternity of St. Peter. Father Guillaume de Tanoüarn, father Philippe Laguérie, and father Grégoire Celier went on air. Jean Ferré also invited as a permanent adviser Father André Wartelle until his death in 2001. Certain guests were less frequent, but more politically correct such as Father Alain de La Morandais.

The host who presented the most openly religious broadcasts included Philippe Maxence and Daniel Hamiche.

=== Cultural line ===
Radio Courtoisie gave a lot of time to history, literature and issues relevant to French-speakers, and to a lesser extent, painting, sculpture, cinema, theatre and poetry. The most culture-oriented programmes were presented by hosts such as Jean-Paul Bled, Philippe de Saint Robert, Dominique Paoli, Philippe Lejeune, Jean Darnel, Aude de Kerros, Philippe d'Hugues, Bernard Lugan, Albert Salon, and Michel Mourlet. Among former hosts were Pierre Debray-Ritzen and the adventurers Alexandre Poussin and Sylvain Tesson at the end of the 1990s.

Radio Courtoisie's programmes last between one and three hours. The ethos of the radio favoured a guest being able to express himself at length, so that he could "get to the bottom of his ideas" and "to the bottom of things".

== Supporting cast ==
- Radio Courtoisie benefits or has benefited from the more or less frequent collaboration of various doyens of the intellectual world such as Jean Tulard and Gabriel de Broglie of the Institut de France, Christian Cabrol of the faculty of medicine, Chantal Delsol, Aymeric Chauprade and Jacques Heers of the Sorbonne, Bertrand Lemennicier of Panthéon-Assas University, Yves Roucaute of Paris X Nanterre, Maurice Druon and Jacqueline de Romilly of the Académie Française, as well as other academics and university staff.
- Other personalities participate in programmes such as General Pierre-Marie Gallois, the Figaro columnist Ivan Rioufol, Alain Peyrefitte (an adviser to de Gaulle), and the President of the France-Israel Friendship Association Gilles-William Goldnadel.
- Some ministers of the Fillon government have recently been guests on Radio Courtoisie: Xavier Darcos, education minister, guest of Catherine Rouvier; and Valérie Pécresse, minister of higher education and research, guest of Yannick Urrien.
- More controversial and unexpected personalities have also been guests, generally on a one-off basis: Brigitte Bardot, Thierry Ardisson, Jacques Vergès, Alain Soral, Dieudonné, the ufologists Jean-Pierre Petit and Joël Mesnard, and the historical negationist Pierre Guillaume (not to be confused with the soldier of the same name, who hosted a programme for many years until his death in 2002).

== Other products ==
- The publication Le Courrier de Radio Courtoisie. Two issues have appeared: Dix mille heures de créations radiophoniques in 1992, and Dix ans de ferveur in 1998.
- The Fête de la Courtoisie: a large annual sales event in May/June bringing together writers who have been on air at Radio Courtoisie. According to the radion, there were to be more thawn 400 attendees in 2008.

=== Jean Ferré Prize ===
- The Jean Ferré Prize, known as the Daudet Prize until 2007: created in honour of Alphonse Daudet and Léon Daudet, it is awarded each year to the person who, according to Radio Courtoisie listeners, has best served the French language. Since the death of Ferré, who was the last recipient of the Daudet prize and who was awarded it posthumously, the prize is now known as the Jean Ferré prize following protests from the descendants of Léon Daudet who were scandalised by Henry de Lesquen's practices.

The prize was thus renamed the Jean Ferré Prize in 2007.

==== Recipients ====
- 1997: Jacques Lacant
- 1998: Brigitte Level
- 1999: Jean Dutourd
- 2000: Jacqueline de Romilly
- 2001: Bernard Lugan
- 2002: Jean-Marc Varaut
- 2003: Vladimir Volkoff
- 2004: Jean Raspail
- 2005: Jean des Cars
- 2006: Jean Ferré
- 2007: Serge de Beketch
- 2008: Albert Salon
- 2009: Pierre Chaunu
- 2010: Michel Déon
- 2011: François-Georges Dreyfus
- 2012: Richard Millet
- 2013: Philippe de Villiers
- 2014: Alain Lanavère
- 2015: Renaud Camus
- 2016: Philippe d'Hugues and Jacques Trémolet de Villers
- 2017: Jean-Yves Le Gallou

== Broadcasting frequencies ==
Radio Courtoisie broadcasts on the following FM band frequencies:

- Paris and Île-de-France: 95.6 MHz,
- Chartres: 104.5 MHz,
- Le Mans: 98.8 MHz,
- Le Havre: 101.1 MHz,
- Caen: 100.6 MHz,
- Cherbourg: 87.8 MHz.

Radio Courtoisie was transmitted by the HOT BIRD satellite of Eutelsat. It could be received either by the satellite bouquet satellite TPS (radio no. 80), or directly via transponder 120, at 10911 MHz, vertical polarisation verticale, 27500|Msymb/s, FEC 3/4, SID 3305, audio 3335. This transmission was planned to stop in 2008 with the disappearance of TPS.

Radio Courtoisie has been clearly accessible since January 2008 on the satellite bouquet CanalSat (satellite Astra H1 19°.2) on channel 179.

== Controversy ==
On 16 May 1993, Radio Courtoisie and host Serge de Beketch were convicted of defaming Olivier Biffaud, journalist for the daily newspaper Le Monde, and sentenced to pay a single Franc symbolic of damages and interests, as well as 8,000 Francs court costs. De Beketch had declared, mentioning Biffaud's initials, that it would be a good name for a sanitary towel. The court judged that this phrase "offended against the delicacy and dignity of the person in question".

A Radio Courtoisie interview of Alain Menargues in October 2004 caused controversy due to his claim that the Jews created the first ghettoes because they disliked being around "impure non-Jews.".

From 1997 to 2006, the French Conseil supérieur de l'audiovisuel broadcasting authority examined Radio Courtoisie, for statements considered potentially racist, injurious or revisionist which were broadcast on air and originated from a host or speaker, issuing three letters, and two warnings. As a sanction, the CSA ordered its communiqué to be inserted at the beginning of the programme Le Libre Journal on 13 November 2006 at 6 pm.

Some critics of Radio Courtoisie assert that positions espoused by certain hosts on air are close to those of the extreme right, pointing to broadcasts with contributors from traditionalist Catholicism, the Mouvement pour la France, the Mouvement national républicain and the Front National. They also base this on the opposition described in certain programmes between the so-called droite molle (soft right, principally including the Union pour un mouvement populaire), and the rest of the right wing, meaning to the right of the UMP. Those Radio Courtoisie hosts who are close to the Front national or who accept them, reject the "extreme right" moniker, with the exception of de Beketch. Le Pen himself recalled on air at Radio Courtoisie the same refusal to be ascribed to this category, preferring "national right".
