= Carrefour de l'Horloge =

French far-right national liberal think tank

- Formation: 10 July 1974; 52 years ago
- Founder: Henry de Lesquen, Jean-Yves Le Gallou, Yvan Blot and others
- Type: Meta-political club
- Purpose: Think thank for Integral Neo-Darwinist
- Headquarters: 8th arrondissement of Paris, Paris, French Republic
- Fields: National liberalism Economic liberalism French nationalism Ethnic nationalism Social darwinism Popular democracy
- President: Henry de Lesquen
- Secretary-General: Pierre Millan
- Website: https://carrefourdelhorloge.fr/
- Formerly called: Club de l'Horloge

The Carrefour de l'Horloge (literally The Clock Crossroad), formerly Club de l'Horloge (1974–2015), is a French far-right national liberal think tank founded in 1974 and presided by Henry de Lesquen. The organization promotes an "integral neo-Darwinist" philosophy, characterized by a form of economic liberalism infused with ethnic nationalism.

Born as a splinter group from GRECE in the years 1974–79, the Carrefour de l'Horloge shares many similarities with the Nouvelle Droite, although it stands out by its defense of Catholicism and economic liberalism. Like the Nouvelle Droite, they use meta-political strategies to diffuse their ideas in wider society; however, the Carrefour de l'Horloge favours more direct methods, such as entryism into mainstream parties and senior public offices, along with the creation of catch-all slogans to influence the public debate. The group and its members have for instance coined terms like "national preference" and "re-information", and participated in popularizing the concepts of "Great Replacement" and "remigration" in France.

== History ==
=== Background: 1968–1973 ===
The origin of the Carrefour de l'Horloge can be traced back to the "Cercle Pareto", a club established in Sciences Po by students associated with GRECE, an ethno-nationalist think-tank founded in January 1968 by Alain de Benoist and other far-right militants. The Cercle was founded at the end of the same year by Yvan Blot and other students hostile to the left-wing May 1968 unrests. He was soon joined by Jean-Yves Le Gallou (1969), Guillaume Faye (1970), Daniel Garrigue, and Georges-Henri Bousquet.

The Cercle had around 30 members in the winter of 1970. Many of the founding members of the Club de l'Horloge met at the elite École Nationale d'Administration (ENA) between 1972 and 1974; among them were Le Gallou, Henry de Lesquen, Jean-Paul Antoine, Didier Maupas, and Bernard Mazin. In 1973, three Cercle members—Blot, Le Gallou, and Mazin—tried to convince de Benoist to enter politics, which he ardently refused.

=== Emergence: 1974–1979 ===
The Carrefour de l'Horloge was created as Club de l'Horloge on 10 July 1974 by Jean-Yves Le Gallou, Yvan Blot, Henry de Lesquen, Daniel Garrigue, and others. The founders, who graduated from high-ranked schools, regarded themselves as part of an elite think tank whose project was diffusing nationalist ideas within the public sphere, and serving as a link between GRECE, mainstream politics and senior public offices in France. Bruno Mégret joined the Club in 1975.

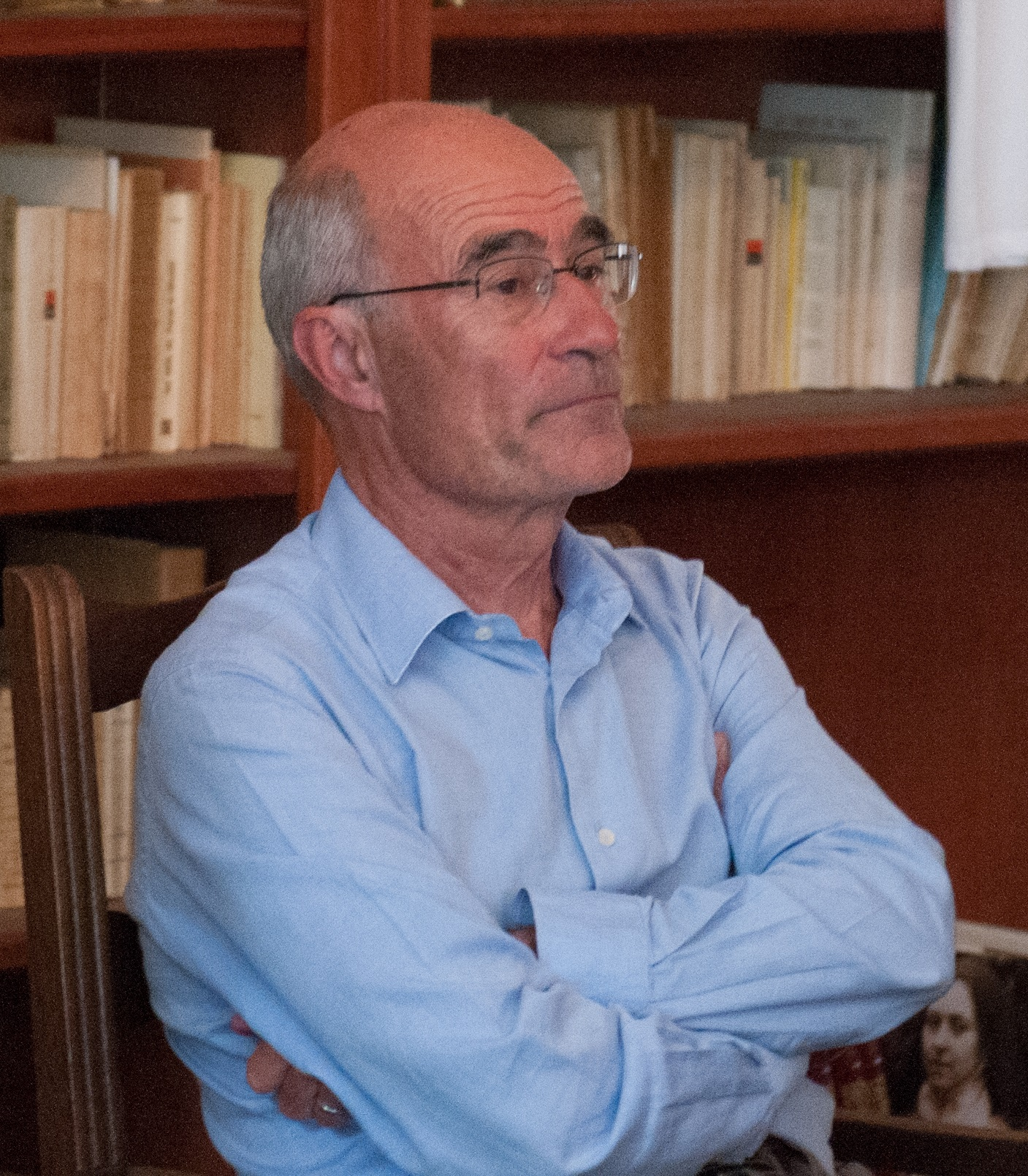
Jean-Yves Le Gallou, prominent member of the Carrefour de l'Horloge.

From 1975, Le Gallou served as a civil administrator at the Minister of the Interior, where he tried to diffuse his political ideas in administrative reports. In charge of the redaction of a local study, he linked the social issues facing the city of Chanteloup-les-Vignes with immigration, but his theories were toned down by his hierarchy in the final version. In March 1976, however, Le Gallou managed to have an article on the "economic assessment of immigration" published in the magazine Administration, which was sent to all French Prefects. Co-written by Le Gallou and Philippe Baccou, the article described immigration as "[posing] as many or more problems in the long term as it solves", and insisted on the "ethno-cultural" barriers to integration: "in the future, the labour reserve will be situated in the remotest countries, where the population is less assimilable."

Between 1974 and 1982, the Club invited to their conferences numerous high-ranking public servants and politicians, which represented half of the attendants, the remaining seats being filled by journalists, academics and businessmen. Among them were Yves Guéna, Michel Jobert, Philippe Malaud, Pierre Mazeaud, Raymond Marcellin, Michel Debré, Jean Lecanuet, Alain Madelin, Michel Poniatowski, René Monory, Jean-Marcel Jeanneney, Maurice Couve de Murville, Edgar Faure, Alain Juppé, Lionel Stoléru, or Jean-Louis Gergorin.

In the 1970s, the Club de l'Horloge was for some time under the protection of French Minister of the Interior Michel Poniatowski. Between 1974 and 1978, the progression of nativist ideas in the public discourse of Poniatowski can be attributed in part to the influence of the Club and the Nouvelle Droite, Poniatowski largely citing their works in his 1978 book L'avenir n'est écrit nulle part. "From India to Iceland", Poniatowski writes, "almost all white populations have the same cultural origin and an ethnological kinship confirmed by the specific distribution of blood groups." However, apart from the local influence of Yvan Blot, who served as an Inspector General at the Ministry of the Interior under Poniatowski and Christian Bonnet, the official policy of the government on immigration remained mostly of out reach of the Club's influence.

The book La Politique du vivant ("The Politics of living"), published in 1979 under the direction of De Lesquen, stemmed from GRECE theories on sociobiology, genetic determinism and social Darwinism. The same year, Henry de Lesquen was invited on the French TV literary talk show Apostrophes to debate the Nouvelle Droite. However, a media campaign against the Nouvelle Droite and the Club that denounced the "Vichyst sympathies" of the French authorities damaged their public reputation in France.

The ideological agenda of the Club during this period can be defined as a syncretism of neo-liberalism, right-wing nationalism, and eugenistic doctrines. Their advocacy of liberalism gradually clashed with the philosophy of GRECE, and with de Benoist in particular, who associated the idea with Americanism and materialism. Dismissing the long-term meta-political strategy of de Benoist and GRECE—whose Le Gallou and Blot were former members—the Club de l'Horloge aimed at more immediate results, and instead favoured a tactic of entryism inside the two French mainstream right-wing parties of the period, the Rally for the Republic (RPR) and the Union for French Democracy (UDF). Since the years 1979–80, the Club de l'Horloge has distanced itself from the neo-paganism and anti-capitalism of GRECE and the Nouvelle Droite, promoting instead a form of economic liberalism strongly tainted with ethnic nationalism.

=== Club de l'Horloge: 1980–2014 ===
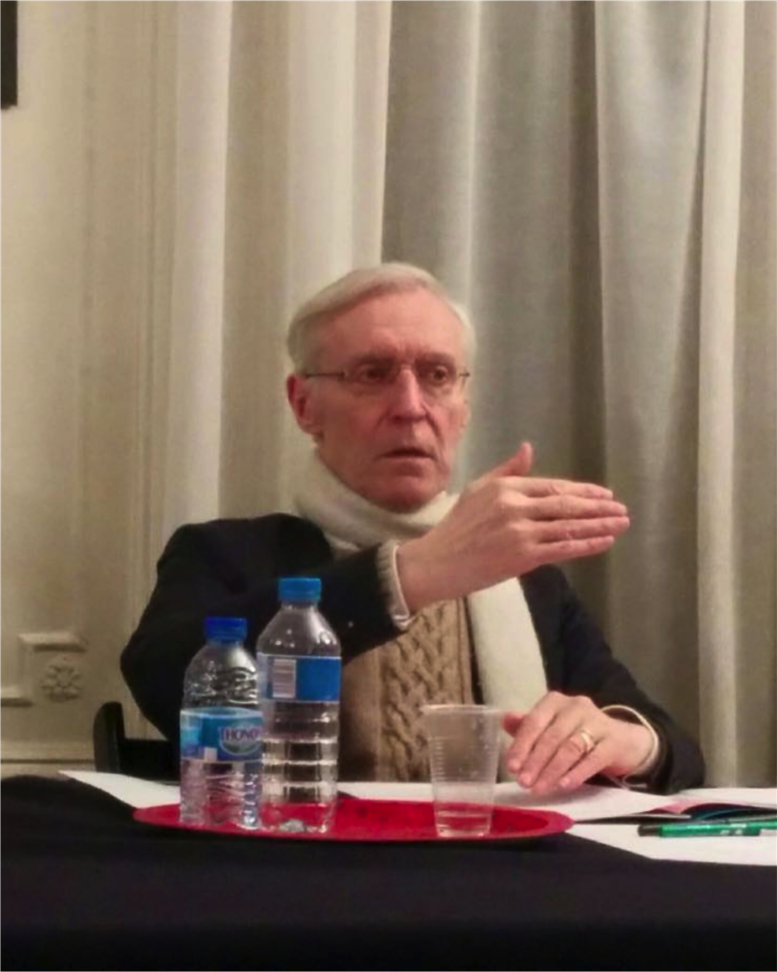
Henry de Lesquen, current president of the club and provocative blogger, is one of the main promoters of the concept of "remigration" in France.

The Club's strategy of entryism began to show some success in the 1980s: Le Gallou entered the UDF in the early 1980s while many other lead members, such as Mégret (from 1975 to 1982), De Lesquen (1977–85), or Blot (1979–88), were already part of the RPR. As Le Gallou grew in importance, he developed and promoted the concept of "national preference", and served as a link between the Club and the far-right party Front National (FN), which he joined in 1985.

The Club de l'Horloge created in 1990 the "Lysenko prize", in reference to Soviet pseudo-scientist Trofim Lysenko. The satirical award has since been attributed each year to a public figure who has, in their view, "contributed to spreading scientific or historical misinformation, with ideological methods and arguments". Bruno Mégret coined in 1997 the word "re-information" to designate nationalist news outlets that opposed the mainstream media, a term that has since been widely used by far-right online websites in France.

=== Renaming and revival: 2015–present ===
In September 2015, the Club de l'Horloge was renamed "Carrefour de l'Horloge", and merged with the smaller associations Voix des Français, Renaissance 95, SOS Identité and the Mouvement associatif pour l'union de la droite.

The first meeting under the new name was organized on 16 January 2016 with Charles Beigbeder, Christian Vanneste, Blot, De Lesquen, and Le Gallou. The National Liberal Party (PNL) was founded in 2017 and publicly announced the following year to promote national liberal ideas, and restore traditional French values and liberal economics through ideological influence rather than elected office. During the 2017 presidential election, Philippe Baccou, one of the prominent members of the club, was among the most influential political advisers of FN candidate Marine Le Pen.

Carrefour de l'Horloge's president Henry de Lesquen runs a YouTube channel totaling several million views through which he participated in popularizing the concept of "remigration" in France, and racialist theories built on anthropologist Carleton S. Coon's works.

== Views ==
The Carrefour de l'Horloge recognizes what they call twelve "mentors":

- Philosophy: Edmund Burke, Hippolyte Taine, Julien Freund,
- Economics: Friedrich Hayek, Ludwig von Mises,
- Sociology: Gustave Le Bon, Arnold Gehlen, Vilfredo Pareto, Jules Monnerot,
- Laws: Carl Schmitt,
- Biology: Konrad Lorenz and Jacques Monod.

The ideology of the Carrefour de l'Horloge was originally inspired by social Darwinism, before gradually merging neoliberalism with racialism to create an "integral neo-Darwinism". The think tank promotes in the 2010s economic liberalism, nationalism and popular democracy. Political scientist Fiammetta Venner labelled the club "national radical" in 2006.

The adoption of a liberal-national economy theory by the think tank during the 1970s led to a doctrinal break with GRECE, which had been denouncing economic liberalism as a "[destroyer of] collective identities and ‘rooted’ cultures and [...] a generator of uniformity". The common of defence of identity, however, allowed the Club and GRECE to operate as different factions within the wider Nouvelle Droite movement. According to scholar Tamir-Baron, "the neo-liberal, hyper-capitalism espoused by the Club de l'Horloge is reminiscent of intellectuals Friedrich Hayek and Milton Friedman, as well as Anglo-American New Right (AANR) political forces such as Thatcherism and Reaganism. The AANR's neoliberalism has often been dubbed the European New Right's 'principal enemy' and is the source of vitriolic attacks against the United States, seen as the major representative of this materialistic worldview".

The club is a supporter of popular democracy and theorized the citizens' initiative referendum back in 1986. The following year, Yvan Blot introduced a bill in the lower house to permit popular-initiative referendums, but failed to gain enough support. The club praises "popular common sense" against what they call the "confiscation of democracy" by uprooted elites. Blot's ideas have been influential on the Front National, which portrayed itself as the "best defender of democracy".

== Lysenko Prize ==
Since 1990, the Carrefour de l'Horloge awards each year the satirical "Lysenko Prize" to an author or person who "has contributed the most to scientific and historical misinformation, using ideological methods and arguments."

== Notable members ==
- Henry de Lesquen
- Jean-Yves Le Gallou
- Yvan Blot
- Bruno Mégret
- Alain Madelin
- Gérard Longuet
- Pierre Chaunu
- Daniel Garrigue
- Jules Monnerot
- Achille Dauphin-Meunier
- Franck Gilard
- Christian Noyer
- Henri de La Bastide
- Christian Vanneste
- Yves-Thibault de Silguy
- Maryvonne de Saint-Pulgent
- Pascal Lorot
- Yvan Durand
- Pierre Debray-Ritzen

== See also ==
- National liberalism
- Remigration
- Ghost skin
