= Yvan Blot =

French conservative politician (1948–2018)

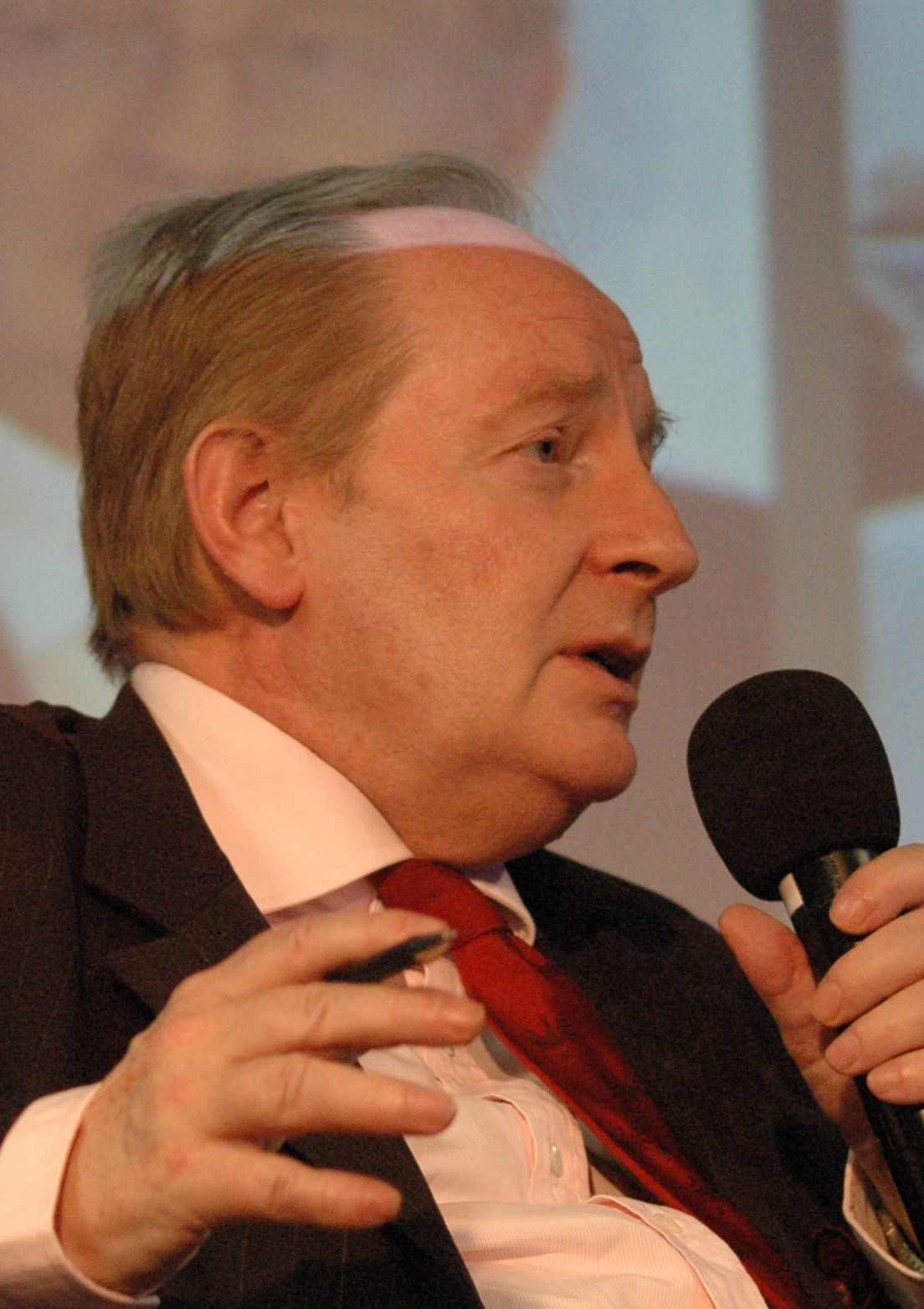
- Blot in 2012

Member of European Parliament
- In office 25 July 1989 – 19 July 1999

Member of Parliament
- In office 2 April 1986 – 14 May 1988
- Constituency: Pas-de-Calais

Personal details
- Born: Yvan Michel Blot; 29 June 1948 Saint-Mandé, France
- Died: 10 October 2018 (aged 70)
- Party: RPR (until 1989); FN (1989–2000); UMP (2004–15); RIF (2011–13)
- Education: Sciences Po

Yvan Blot (French: [ivɑ̃ blo]; 29 June 1948 – 10 October 2018) was a French conservative politician. A founding member of the GRECE, he was also the co-creator and president of the Club de l'Horloge.

== Biography ==
Born on 29 June 1948 in Saint-Mandé, Yvan Blot was the son of Camille Blot and Adela Sophia Brys. He studied in Lycée Henri IV and graduated from Sciences Po and earned a doctorate in economics at the same university in 2004.

Blot founded in the Cercle Pareto, a Sciences Po student organization linked to the Nouvelle Droite, and was soon joined by Jean-Yves Le Gallou, Daniel Garrigue and Guillaume Faye. Between 1971 and 1974, he wrote under the pen name "Michel Norey" racialist essays on "biological realism". Dismissing the anti-Christian stance and long-term strategies Alain de Benoist and his GRECE, he co-founded in July 1974 the Club de l'Horloge.

A former Gaullist parliamentarian (for Rally for the Republic), Blot also served as a leading civil servant under both Interior Minister Michel Poniatowski and Alain Devaquet. He joined the Front National in 1989 and was elected to the European Parliament in the 1989 election.

A prominent Eurosceptic, Blot played a leading role in establishing a committee to support the Bruges Group in France. He also played a leading role in FN policy making, joining other Club de l'Horloge alumni such as Bruno Mégret, Henry de Lesquen and Jean-Yves Le Gallou in driving the party away from corporatism and towards neo-liberal economics. He wrote for Nation Europa magazine. In the early 2000s, he became a member of the UMP. He was the founder of the association "Agir pour la démocratie directe" in Paris. The mission statement of this association is to change the French constitution on the Swiss model.

Blot retired from the French administration in July 2013 and became professor in direct democracy at the University of Nice, at the Catholic University of Rennes and in the University of Velikie Novgorod in Russia. He was a member of the French Catholic Academy and a consultant for the radio station "Voice of Russia" in Paris. He worked for the think tank Idexia with Charles Beigbeder and Guillaume Peltier, a group favouring the return of the former president Nicolas Sarkozy to power.

Blot was author of numerous essays in politics and philosophy, such as L'oligarchie au pouvoir and La démocratie directe: une chance pour la France, Les faux prophètes and Nous les enfants d'Athéna. his last books were L'homme défiguré (2015) and La Russie de Poutine (2015).
