= National Republican Movement =

French nationalist political party

National Republican Movement Mouvement national républicain
- Leader: Hubert Savon
- Founded: 2 October 1999
- Split from: National Front
- Headquarters: 15 rue de Cronstadt; 75015 Paris
- Ideology: French nationalism National conservatism Social conservatism Anti-immigration; Right-wing populism Nouvelle Droite
- Political position: Far-right
- Colours: Blue, White and Red
- Seats in the National Assembly: 0 / 577
- Seats in the Senate: 0 / 343
- Seats in the European Parliament: 0 / 72

Website
- www.m-n-r.net

The National Republican Movement (Mouvement national républicain or MNR) is a French nationalist political party, created by Bruno Mégret with former Club de l'Horloge members Yvan Blot (also a member of GRECE) and Jean-Yves Le Gallou, as a split from Jean-Marie Le Pen's National Front on 24 January 1999.

Mégret has tried in the past to distance himself from Le Pen's provocative statements, in particular concerning Holocaust denial. In 2001, a call for reconciliation between the two parties was endorsed by Roland Gaucher.

== History ==
Initially, Bruno Mégret was the chairman, with Serge Martinez vice-chairman, Jean-Yves Le Gallou, executive director and Franck Timmermans secretary-general. Other notable members of the party included Jean Haudry, Pierre Vial, Jean-Claude Bardet, Xavier Guillemot, Christian Bouchet and Maxime Brunerie. In 2000, the party had fewer than 5000 members, while its youth movement, the Movement National de la Jeunesse, headed by Philippe Schleiter, nephew of Robert Faurisson, had 1500 members. The student union Renouveau Etudiant had close ties with the MNR thanks to Pierre Vial. The party was initially known as the Front National-Mouvement National, but was forced to change its name to Mouvement National Républicain on 2 October 1999 after being sued by Le Pen for trademark infringement.

In 2000, via the organisation Promouvoir, the MNR sued successfully for the ban of the film Baise-moi to minors. Pierre Vial left the MNR in October 2001, Bruno Mégret having expressed solidarity with the US after the 11 September 2001 attack on the World Trade Center.

During the 2004 campaign for the regional elections, the MNR campaigned under the "No to Islamisation" slogan.

In 2005, it campaigned against the proposed European Constitution and the possible accession of Turkey to the European Union; Bruno Mégret said that the Europeans, including France, were lying to the Turks by having them believe they could integrate within the EU, whereas public opinion would surely reject Turkey's membership in a referendum. As a result of MNR's poor electoral results, Franck Timmermans and a few other former MNR members formed a new party in 2005, called the Parti populiste (Populist Party, PP) which gravitated back towards the Front national (Timmermans will later join Front national's cantonal campaign by representing it in Saint-Nazaire, as other candidates in Northern France in March 2008).

As the Front national organised its traditional 1 May rally in Paris, to honour the memory of Joan of Arc, its president Jean-Marie Le Pen explicitly called for a union of all patriots, in the context of the approaching French presidential election of 2007. MNR, via Bruno Mégret, responded positively to this proposition, as did the Parti populiste. The Union des patriotes (Union of Patriots) was officially launched on 20 December 2006 by a symbolic reconciliation in Le Pen Montretout's mansion in Saint-Cloud, where both Le Pen and Mégret presented the initiative to the press, alongside their respective wives. The fundamental target for the MNR was to secure the support of some 140 signatures from great electors for Jean-Marie Le Pen's presidential candidacy, of the total of 500 required. In the end, the MNR could only collect 45 signatures.

Front national and Mouvement national républicain organised separate campaigns with their respective activists in favour of Jean-Marie Le Pen's candidacy, with the exception of a major Front national rally in Lyon on 11 March 2007 where Mégret made an appearance among the guests, although he did not speak from the platform). As a result, Mégret regularly criticised this situation, like during appearances on French television channels LCI and I>télé, where he criticises what he considered to be a strategy pursued by Front national general secretary Louis Aliot, and especially Marine Le Pen, intended to downplay the contribution and the efficiency of the Union des patriotes.

On 6 March 2008, Jean-Marie Le Pen claimed that the MNR was funded illegally by the UIMM, the steel industry branch of the Medef. Bruno Mégret denied these accusations, and counter-claimed that it was foolish for Jean Marie Le Pen to make such claims, as he has been already alleged to be funded by Saddam Hussein and the Unification Church of Sun Myung Moon. In an interview to France 2 on the same day, Le Pen clarified that he had not claimed Bruno Mégret was personally receiving funds from UIMM.

Later in 2008, Bruno Mégret stepped down from party leadership and retired from political life.

During the 2017 presidential campaign, the MNR called for a vote for François Fillon in the first round, considering that Marine Le Pen was already "assured of being qualified for the second round" and that it was necessary to "exclude from the second round" Emmanuel Macron and Jean-Luc Mélenchon.

During the 2022 presidential and legislative elections, the MNR supported Éric Zemmour and his Reconquête party.

== Electoral results ==
- 1999 European Parliament election: Bruno Mégret's list gets 578,774 votes (3.28%) but fails to win seats in the EU Parliament.
- 2002 French presidential election: Bruno Mégret wins 2.33% of the popular vote.
- 2002 French legislative elections: the MNR run 572 candidates across France getting 276,376 votes and 1.09% of the popular vote. No MNR candidate will be elected during this election.
- 2004 regional elections: the MNR runs candidates in 13 of the 22 metropolitan Regions of France. The best result obtained by the party is Alain Vauzelle's 2.95% in the Provence-Alpes-Côte d'Azur.
- 2004 European Parliament election: the MNR gets low results with an average of 0.31%.
- 2007 French Presidential election: Bruno Mégret and the MNR support the National Front (FN) candidate, Jean-Marie Le Pen.
- 2007 French legislative elections: Bruno Mégret calls for a "patriotic alliance" grouping all the far-right parties. Nevertheless, neither the FN nor the Movement for France (MPF) will positively respond to his idea. Finally, the MNR ran 379 candidates across France and, in the areas without any MNR candidate, the party supported FN candidates such as Bruno Gollnisch, in Lyon's eastern suburbs. The MNR candidates, who ran under the slogan Against Immigration, Islamisation and Insecurity, only gathered 00.39% of the popular vote and were all eliminated. Mégret himself was in competition against a Front national's candidate in the 12th circonscription of Provence-Alpes-Côte d'Azur (Vitrolles-Marignane), Gérald Gerin, Jean-Marie Le Pen's own majordome : Mégret gathering 02.25% of the vote and Gerin 07.50%.

== See also ==
- Politics of France
- Union of the Far-Right (2024)
