= Nippean Bat =

Nippean Bat និព្វានបាទ
- King of the Khmer Empire
- Reign: 1340–1346
- Predecessor: Trasak Paem
- Successor: Sithean Reachea
- Born: 1292; Angkor, Khmer Empire
- Died: 1346 (aged 53–54); Angkor, Khmer Empire
- House: Trasak Paem

Nippean Bat (Khmer: និព្វានបាទ, Nibbānapāda), also known as Ponhea Kreak by his personal name, was ruler of the Khmer Empire from 1340 to 1346. Nippean Bat or "Nirvana Pada" was the eldest son of Trasak Paem. According to the Royal Chronicles, he succeeded his father and during his reign, the Thais led a revolt declaring their own independent kingdoms and became free from the vassalage of the Khmer empire.

He was succeeded by his younger brother Sithean Reachea.

== Issues ==
King Nippean Bat left three sons:

- Lompong Reachea
- Soriyotei I
- Prince Sukha Dhara Pada father of Sri Surya Varman I first King of Cambodia from 1359 to 1366 according to some versions of the Royal Chronicles.

== Sources ==
- Achille Dauphin-Meunier, Histoire du Cambodge, Que sais-je ? N° 916, P.U.F 1968.
- Anthony Stokvis, Manuel d'histoire, de généalogie et de chronologie de tous les États du globe, depuis les temps les plus reculés jusqu'à nos jours, préf. H. F. Wijnman, Israël, 1966, Chapitre XIV §.9 " Kambodge " p. 337 et tableau généalogique n°34 p. 338.
- Peter Truhart, Regents of Nations, K.G Saur Münich, 1984–1988 ISBN 359810491X, Art. " Kampuchea ", p. 1731.

Regnal titles
Preceded by Neay Trasac Paem Chay	Emperor of Angkor; 1340–1346	Succeeded by Sithean Reachea
