= Trasak Paem =

Lengendary ruler of the Khmer Empire

Ang Chey (Trasak Paem)
- Reign: 1336-1340
- Successor: Nippean Bat
- Died: c. 1340; Angkor, Khmer Empire
- Spouse: Candravati
- Issue: Nippean Bat
Names
- ព្រះបាទ អង្គជ័យ
- House: House of Trasak Paem

Trasak Paem is commonly considered as a lengendary ruler of the Khmer Empire who presumably died around 1340. His legend is similar to Nyaung-u Sawrahan in earlier Burmese Chronicles

He is the first Khmer sovereign mentioned by the Cambodian Royal Chronicles alone. He is the first among a series of nineteen rulers of the Khmer Empire that are presumed to have ruled Cambodia since 443 BC. This list is possibly too short to be credible. The Chronicles indicate that Trasak Paem (also named Chay) was the royal gardener of a king Jayavarman IX as known from Khmer inscriptions.

== Biography ==
=== Rise of the regicidal gardener ===
According to the Cambodian Royal Chronicles, a certain Chay was born from the union of a hermit from Phnom Kulen and a peasant woman from the Samre tribe. His skill in growing sweet cucumbers earned him the title of Neay Trasac Paem (“Chef of Tasty Cucumbers”). He reserved the consumption of it for his king, named Norodom, son of Senaka, who had caused a flood to destroy his land after he angered the naga king Puchang. King Sihanouk gave Trasak Paem his spear to protect his crops. One night, Chay mortally wounded his sovereign with his weapon when the latter wanted to test his zeal. However, before succumbing, the monarch demanded that his assassin not be worried because he had only obeyed his orders and could not be held responsible for the recklessness of his king.

=== Election as the new king ===
As the deceased sovereign left no heir and the astrologers, Brahmans, generals and others could not agree on the name of the successor and decided to rely on the deities. To do this, a ceremony is organized where a white elephant was invited to choose among the most eminent members of the nobility that the empire then counted to determine which was the most eligible to become the new king. The pachyderm very quickly neglected this areopagus and turned towards the crowd who have come to join the celebration and directed itself toward an anonymous person who turned out to be the regicide gardener. The dignitaries had to reluctantly accept this monarch of modest extraction, but faced with their hostility, the new king resolved to leave Angkor for a residence that he had built at Banteay Samré; nevertheless this distance did not put an end to the defamatory practices and it was only after having eliminated the faithful of his predecessors that Chay could begin a reign which would prove to be uneventful.

=== Royal wedding and legitimate descendance ===
Trasak Paem married Candravati the daughter of his predecessor and the couple would thus be at the origin of the dynasty which still reigns over Cambodia today. According to the Chronicles King Chay left two sons known by their posthumous names:

- Nippean Bat (Nirvanapada)
- Sithean Reachea (Sidhanaraja)

== Analysis ==
=== Historiography ===
The legend of Trasak Paem The Cambodian Royal Chronicles give two different accounts of the legend of Trasak Paem, one that happens after the flood of 729, and another one that is placed in 1340, as translated by Jean Moura and Etienne Aymonier. This time gap was filled in by a series of king and led French historiography to explain the little trust that could be given to Cambodian Royal Chronicles in terms of historical accuracy.

The legend of Trasak Paem has a narrative very similar to one present in the Burmese Chronicles of Maha Yazawin and Pagan Yazawin. The latter relates who the Bagan dynasty ended the invasion of Khubilai Khan. The Burmese legend probably made into the Khmer Chronicles through a Burmese collection of folk tales known as The Precedents of Princess Thoodamma Tsari from which other legends were also translated to Khmer. The Burmese legend had been translated into English by Richard Fleming St Andrew St John in the Burmese Reader .

In the Burmese folk tale, the time frame, which refers to the land of Parajinaka at the time of Vessabhū Buddha and the reign of King Mahamanda, is voluntarily purely fictional. Mahamanda, which means the "frivolous king" in Burmese, translates as Sdach Pal in Khmer, with Sdach meaning "king" and pal meaning "forgetful, idiotic, mean".

The correspondence between the two narratives is striking and due to the greater antiquity of the Burmese Chronicle, it is presumable that the Cambodian narrative of Trasak Paem was copied on the latter.

In 1905, Trasak Paem was widely believed in Cambodia as a historical figure. In 1965, he was still a common reference in the political debate. By 1995, Trasak Paem had widely been accepted as a legendary rather than historical figure.

=== Change of court religion ===
The legend of Trasak Paem seems to symbolize the profound cultural change in the country that Achille Dauphin-Meunier calls the "14th Century Revolution".

This revolution would correspond with the definitive advent of Theravada Buddhism to the detriment of Hinduism which will experience a rapid decline. The king, until then of divine essence and considered as an intermediary between men and the heavens, suddenly became a simple mortal who owed his throne to the virtues he has accumulated in his lives. The goal for the inhabitants was no longer to build mountain temples that would earn them the favor and protection of the gods, but to follow the virtuous conduct of their king in the hope of reaching plenitude. At that period, Sanskrit also ceased to be used in the inscriptions which disappear definitively and in the cult in favor of the Pali.

=== Botanic discovery of the Khmer rulers ===
Belgian writer Jean Guillaume, in his research on the history of domesticated food plants, considers that the legend of Trasak Paem may be a myth related to the appearance of a new variety of vegetable, a sweet cucumber, of which Jayavarman would have been so fond that he reserved the crops for himself and putting them under the care of their gardener.

== Legacy ==
Cambodian road sign for Street 62 in Phnom Penh, named after Trasak Paem.

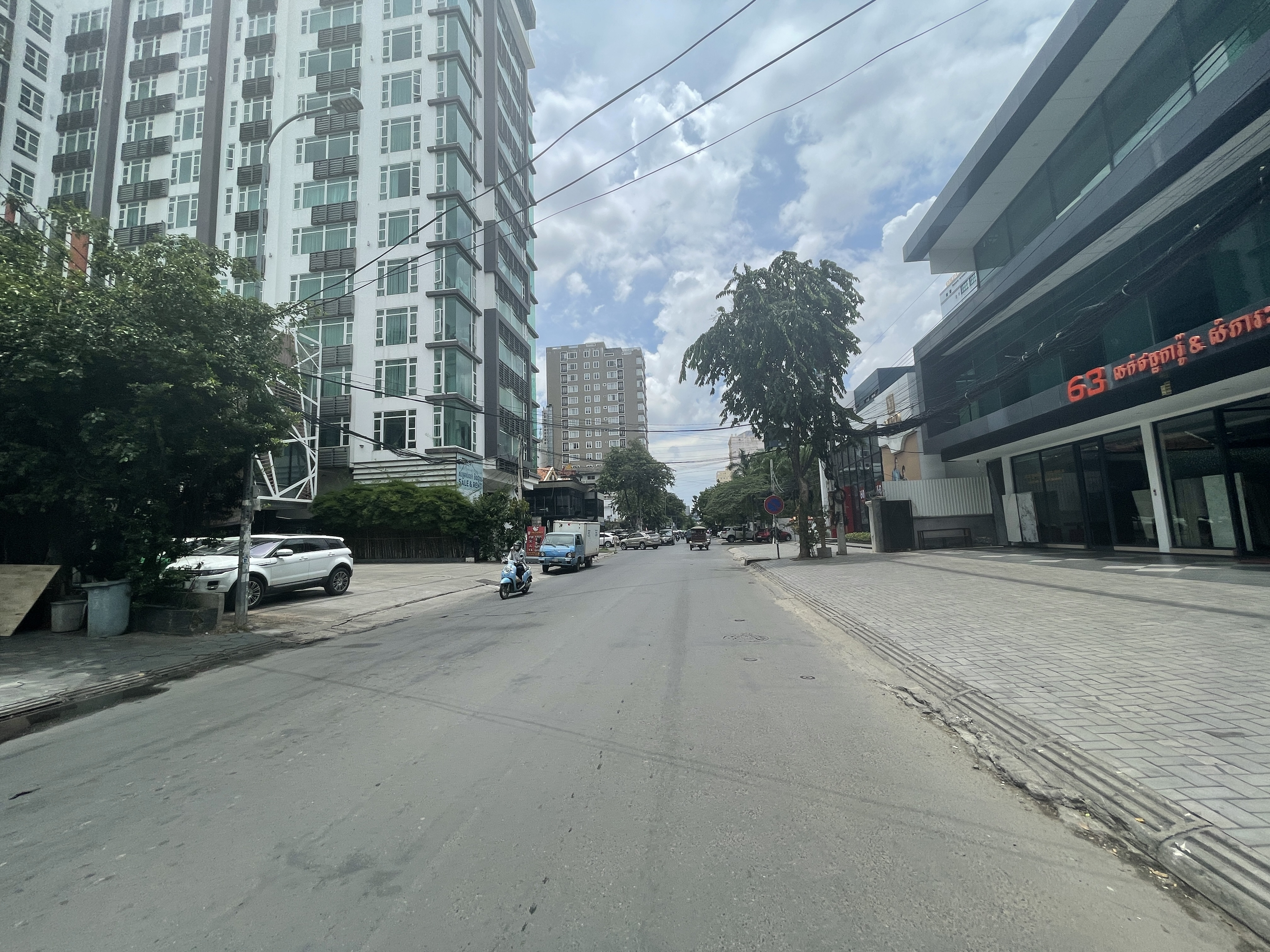
Preah Trasak Paem Street (Street 63)

=== Royal regalia: the victory spear ===
The victory spear (Preah Lompeng Chey) associated with the legend of Trasak Paem is one of Khmer royal regalia, along with the royal sword called Preah Khan Reach, the dagger called Kris given to the Muslim king of Cambodia, Ramathipadi I by a Malay princess.

=== Political reference ===
Despite being a legendary figure, King Trasak Paem has been a regular reference for modern monarchs of Cambodia. Between 1872 and 1882, King Norodom made four visits to caves on Phnom Chriev in search of powerful Buddha images supposedly hidden there by legendary king Ta Trasak Paem.

King Sihanouk referred to the popular legend of King Trasak Paem, a neak mean bon, to justify his 1955 abdication in favour of his father Suramarit, and his new role as chairman of the Sangkum Reastr Niyum. In fact, Sihanouk described himself as a "very courageous and energetic man as was “Ta Trasak Paem” (the old man with sweet cucumbers) who did not hesitate to slay his King".

By drawing on the legend [of Trasak Poem], Sihanouk was able to replace the idea of rule by traditional quasi-divine right with a slightly more democratic and popular notion of exclusive political power.

— Ian Harris, Cambodian Buddhism: History and Practice

=== Topography ===
Street 63 in Phnom Penh is also known as Trasak Paem Street. It is next to Khan Châmkar Mon and has a length of 1.99 kilometres.

== See also ==
- Zhou Daguan
- Khom
- Historical Negationism
- Anti-Khmer sentiment
- Thai nationalism
- Nyaung-u Sawrahan Similar story in Burmese history.

== Bibliography ==
- Edouard Huber, Études indochinoises - Le jardinier régicide qui devint roi', [Bulletin de l'École française d'Extrême-Orient, 1905, Vol 5,p. 168-184].
- Achille Dauphin-Meunier, Histoire du Cambodge, Que sais-je ? No. 916, P.U.F 1968 ASIN B0000DOWAF
- Anthony Stokvis, Manuel d'histoire, de généalogie et de chronologie de tous les États du globe, depuis les temps les plus reculés jusqu'à nos jours, préf. H. F. Wijnman, éditions Brill Leyde 1888, réédition 1966, Volume 1 Part 1: Asia, chapitre XIV §.9 « Kambodge » Listes et tableau généalogique No. 34 p. 336-339.
- (en) & (de) Peter Truhart, Regents of Nations, K.G Saur Munich, 1984-1988 ISBN 359810491X, Art. « Kampuchea », p. 1729-1733.
