= Populist Party (France) =

The Populist Party (French: Parti populiste) is a minor nationalist political party in France. It was established in 2005 by Franck Timmermans and Christian Perez, former members of Bruno Mégret's National Republican Movement, which split from the larger National Front (FN) in 1998.

In the 2007 French presidential election, the Populist Party supported FN candidate Jean-Marie Le Pen, as part of the 'Patriotic Union' (l'Union patriotique) including Mégret's National Republican Movement the 'Patriotic Union' (l'Union patriotique)
