= Fiammetta (given name) =

Fiammetta is an Italian feminine given name.

== List of people with the given name ==
- Fiammetta Baralla (1943–2013), Italian actress
- Fiammetta Cicogna (born 1988), Italian television presenter, actress and model
- Fiammetta Modena (born 1965), Italian politician
- Fiammetta Rossi (born 1995), Italian shooter
- Fiammetta Venner (born 1971), French political scientist, writer and editor
- Fiammetta Wilson (1864–1920), British astronomer

== See also ==
- Maria d'Aquino, also known as Fiammetta
- Tony Fiammetta, American footballer
