= Sithean Reachea =

Ruler of the Khmer Empire (1346–1347)

Sithean Reachea សិទ្ធានរាជា

King of the Khmer Empire
- Reign: 1346–1347
- Predecessor: Nippean Bat
- Successor: Lompeng Reachea
- Born: 1309
- Died: 1347 (aged 37–38)
- House: Trasak Paem
- Father: Trasak Paem
- Mother: Chantreavattey

Sithean Reachea (Khmer: សិទ្ធានរាជា, Siddhānarājā) or Sidhanta Raja (full regnal name: Brahat Pada Samdach Sdach Rajankariya Brhat Sidhanta Rajadhiraja Ramadipathi) was ruler of the Khmer Empire from 1346 to 1347. Born in 1294, he was the second and youngest son of Trasak Paem. According to the Royal Chronicles, he succeeded his brother Nippean Bat and reigned for three or six months before resigning in favor of his nephew Lompeng Reachea. After his abdication he bore the ceremonial title of "Maha Upayuvaraja" (Retired Great King) and died on an unknown date.

== Sources ==
- (En) Achille Dauphin-Meunier, History of Cambodia, Presses universitaires de France, coll. "What do I know? / 916 ",1968, 128 p.
- (fr) Anthony Marinus Hendrik Johan Stokvis (pref. HF Wijnman), Handbook of history, genealogy and chronology of all states of the world, from the earliest times to the present day, t. 9, BM Israel,1966, chap. XIV ("Kambodge"), p. 337 & Genealogical Chart No. 34 p. 338
- (in) & (de) Peter Truhart, Regents of Nations: Asia: Systematic Chronology of States and Their Political Representatives in Past and Present, vol. 3, Saur, December 1986, 4258 p. (ISBN 9783598104916), "Kampuchea", p. 1731

Sithean Reachea Khmer Dynasty Born: 1294 Died: 1350?
Preceded by Nippean Bat	Emperor of Angkor; 1346–1347	Succeeded by Lompeng Reachea
