= Pierre Debray-Ritzen =

French psychiatrist

- Born: 27 February 1922; 16th arrondissement of Paris
- Died: 7 July 1993; Boulogne-Billancourt
- Occupations: Medical doctor, author
- Awards: prix Littré (1964)

Pierre Debray-Ritzen (27 February 1922 – 7 July 1993) was a French psychiatrist.

He was a member of the Club de l'horloge.

== Publications ==
- L'Odeur du temps, roman, Casterman, 1963
- Le Défi aux étoiles, Plon, 1964
- Les Nervures de l'être : éléments d'une psychologie de la littérature, Rencontre, 1967
- La Dyslexie de l'enfant : origine, dépistage, mesure, rééducation, Casterman, 1970
- Un final vénitien, Fayard, 1971
- Génétique et Psychiatrie, Fayard, 1972
- Les Troubles du comportement de l'enfant, Fayard, 1973 (with Badrig Mélékian)
- La Scolastique freudienne, Fayard, 1973
- Psychologie de la littérature et de la création littéraire, Retz, 1977
- Lettre ouverte aux parents des petits écoliers, Albin Michel, 1978
- Psychologie de la création : de l'art des parfums à l'art littéraire, Albin Michel, 1979
- L'Usure de l'âme, mémoires, Albin Michel, 1980
- Les Cahiers de Tycho de Leyde artiste peintre, 1649–1702, Albin Michel, 1982
- Corot, éd. de Vergeures, collection « À l'école des grands peintres », 1982
- Ce que je crois, Grasset, 1983
- Conversations dans l'univers, Albin Michel, 1986 (with André Brahic)
- Arthur Koestler. Un croisé sans croix, L’Herne, 1987
- Jusqu’à la corde, mémoires, Albin Michel, 1989
- Georges Simenon, romancier de l'instinct, Favre, 1989
- La Mort en moi, roman, L’Âge d’Homme, 1990
- La Psychanalyse, cette imposture, Albin Michel, 1991
- Claude Bernard ou un nouvel état de l'humaine raison, Albin Michel, 1992
