= Maryvonne de Saint-Pulgent =

French official, essayist and musician (born 1951)

- Born: 13 March 1951 (age 75); Châlons-sur-Marne
- Education: Institut d'études politiques de Paris; École Nationale d'Administration; Conservatoire de Paris
- Occupations: Senior civil servant; Musicologist
- Awards: Ordre des Arts et des Lettres; National Order of Merit; Legion of Honour

Maryvonne de Saint-Pulgent (born Le Gallo; 13 March 1951, in Châlons-sur-Marne) is a French musicologist and member of the Conseil d’État.

== Career ==
Holder of a master's degree in humanities, Maryvonne de Saint Pulgent continued her studies at Sciences Po then at the École nationale d'administration (ENA, class Guernica).

In parallel with her studies, Maryvonne de Saint Pulgent pursued a musical education. First prize of piano at the Conservatoire de Paris, author of books on music and opera, she has been an associate professor of music and musicology at the Paris-Sorbonne University. She has been a correspondent of the Académie des Beaux-Arts in the musical composition section since 9 June 1993. She has been an editorialist for the weekly Le Point and is a columnist and producer at France Culture.

A member of the Board of Directors of Sciences Po Aix since spring 2015, she was elected president at the end of April and succeeded Christine Lagarde.

She is married to Noël Chamboduc de Saint Pulgent. She was with him a member of the Club de l'horloge until 1979.

== Publications ==
- 1979: La Jurisprudence communale, Le Dictionnaire communal
- 1982: George Gershwin, Paris, Mazarine, 1982 (in collab. with Denis Jeambar)
- 1991: Le Syndrome de l'opéra, Paris, Robert Laffont
- 1999: Le Gouvernement de la culture, by Éditions Gallimard, ISBN 9782070751907
- 2003: with Pierre-Jean Benghozi and Thomas Paris, Mondialisation et diversité culturelle : le cas de la France, Paris, 84 p., Notes of the Ifri 51, series Réactions et réponses à la mondialisation.
- 2008: with Pierre Joxe, Serviteur de la République : entretiens avec Maryvonne de Saint-Pulgent, Paris, L'Aube
- 2009: Culture et communication, les missions d'un grand ministère, series "Découvertes Gallimard" (nº 539), ISBN 978-2-0703-6202-8
- 2010: L'Opéra-comique : le gavroche de la musique, Paris, series "Découvertes Gallimard" (nº 567)
- 2010: Cinquante ans après : culture, politique et politiques culturelles : colloque du cinquantenaire du ministère de la Culture et de la Communication des 13, 14 et 15 octobre 2009, under the direction of Élie Barnavi and Maryvonne de Saint Pulgent, Paris, Comité d'histoire du ministère de la Culture et des institutions culturelles-La Documentation française
- 2013: Jack Lang, batailles pour la culture : dix ans de politiques culturelles, Paris, Comité d'histoire du ministère de la Culture et des institutions culturelles-La Documentation française

=== Prefaces ===
- 2011: Guy Saez (2011). Le Fil de l'esprit; Augustin Girard, un parcours entre recherche et action. Travaux et documents. Paris: Comité d'histoire du ministère de la Culture et des institutions culturelles-La Documentation française. p. 333. ISBN 978-2-11-128143-1.
- 2016: Guy Saez (pref. Maryvonne de Saint Pulgent), La musique au cœur : Regards sur l'action publique de Marcel Landowski, Paris, Comité d'histoire du ministère de la Culture et de la Communication - Documentation française, series "Travaux et documents",
- 2016: Françoise Mosser (pref. Maryvonne de Saint Pulgent), Entretiens avec Jean-Philippe Lecat, ministre de la Culture et de la Communication (1978–1981), Paris, Comité d'histoire du ministère de la Culture et de la Communication - Documentation française, coll. "Travaux et documents", 2016

== Honours and decorations ==
- Chevalier (31 December 1996), officier (13 July 2005) then commandeur de la Légion d'honneur (8 avril 2012).
- Commandeur of the National Order of Merit.
- Commandeur des Arts et des Lettres
