= Aujourd'hui =

French daily newspaper (1940–1944)

Aujourd'hui (French pronunciation: [oʒuʁdɥi], Today) was a daily newspaper in Vichy France published between 1940 and 1944 in Paris. It was founded by journalist Henri Jeanson, who edited the publication during the autumn of 1940. After Jeanson was arrested and forced out as editor for not being sufficiently pro-Vichy, he was replaced by managing editor Georges Suarez, who four years later became the first public figure in post-liberation France to be tried for treason and executed as a collaborationist.

== Background ==
During the exodus of 1940, Paris newspapers had ceased publication, with several prominent dailies such as Le Temps, Le Figaro, and Paris-Match refusing to return to the German-occupied zone despite reassurances. In their absence, the Propagandastaffel helped to launch several newspapers immediately after entering Paris and following the armistice of 22 June 1940.

As journalists started to return to Paris, several other newspapers were established, which appeared less obviously tied to the German authorities. These included Aujourd'hui.

== Formation ==
Otto Abetz, functioning as the de facto German ambassador to Vichy France, was tasked with controlling the press. In an effort to reinvigorate the Paris literary scene, he approached journalist Henri Jeanson to start a literary newspaper that would rival La Gerbe.

Jeanson was well known as a pacifist who had opposed war with Germany, leading to his arrest in 1939 for the "defeatism" he had expressed in his article, "No, mon Daladier, we won't go to your war". At the same time, he had avoided taking a pro-German stance and had even written an editorial defending Herschel Grynszpan, the Jewish teenager who had killed Ernst vom Rath at the German embassy in Paris, in retaliation for the treatment of Jews.

Jeanson's profile had risen after he had resigned from the satirical weekly Le Canard enchaîné, objecting to the newspaper's Communist sympathies, and had worked on the screenplay for the popular 1937 film Pépé le Moko. Author David Pryce-Jones has called seeking out an editor with Jeanson's reputation as a "clever calculation on the part of Abetz".

== First incarnation ==
The first issue of Aujourd'hui newspaper appeared on 10 September 1940, delayed by a month due to an argument with the censor. With Jeanson as editor-in-chief, Aujourd'hui sought to adopt a liberal political orientation, making it an exception among Paris newspapers, which had adopted a pro-German tone. Sponsored by the owner of the Ambassador Theatre in Paris, the newspaper was aimed at literary and theater circles.

Henri Jeanson had initially been told that he could choose his own editorial staff, with assurances that they would be immune from censorship. Surrounding himself with his friends, the image of Aujourd'hui when it launched was "impertinent, populist or boulevardier". The team he assembled included the poet Robert Desnos; writer Marcel Aymé; essayist Léon-Paul Fargue; writer Henry Poulaille; playwright Jean Anouilh; Jean Galtier-Boissière, the former editor of the satirical weekly Crapouillot; cartoonist Guérin; and Marcel Carné, who went on to become a successful filmmaker.

Critical of Philippe Pétain and Pierre Laval meeting with Hitler at Montoire-sur-le-Loir, Aujourd'hui editor Jeanson entered into a public "war of words" with editor Marcel Déat at rival newspaper L'Œuvre, which was more closely aligned with the Germans. Within six weeks of launch, Jeanson was ordered to write an editorial expressing his commitment to collaboration, but he refused, and was subsequently arrested and forced out of the newspaper. The first incarnation of Aujourd'hui thus concluded on 10 November 1940.

== Second incarnation ==
From 3 December 1940, Aujourd'hui was led by managing editor Georges Suarez, who was more amenable to the influence of the Propagandastaffel, with Robert Perrier as editor-in-chief. From that point onward, the newspaper adopted a firmly collaborationist stance, despite Suarez himself having written anti-German books prior to the war.

=== Propaganda ===
Suarez was reportedly paid handsomely to promote collaboration. His editorials urged French citizens to inform on members of the Resistance as a moral obligation. He repeatedly called for more executions of Jews and Communists, quoting Catholic writer Joseph de Maistre's saying that "The executioner is the keystone of modern society". He also argued in his editorials that Jews and Anglo-Saxons should be taken hostage to stop Allied forces from bombing France.

Other contributors to Aujourd'hui included Paul Chack, former captain of the French Navy and decorated First World War veteran, who had authored patriotic children's books and was paid 68,000 francs a month by the Vichy government to write propaganda. His editorials characterized the American Army as "brutal gangsters...living on the fat of the land and raping women"; the White House as controlled by Jews; the English as "Bible in hand, seek[ing] to destroy Europe"; and Allied airmen as "flying assassins".

=== Resistance ===
In this environment, Robert Desnos took pains to remain silent on what he could not say in a Pétainist newspaper, or to make oblique statements, without contradicting his own political views. As the "critique de disques" for Aujourd'hui, he wrote one or two music record reviews per month through February 1944. Literary scholar Charles Nunley explains that "Desnos did on occasion find opportunity to incorporate into these ostensibly apolitical texts a subtle but unmistakably contestatory stance regarding the official culture of France's state of occupation".

Working at Aujourd'hui gave Desnos access to pre-censored news reports and other valuable information which he was able to pass on to other members of the French Resistance. On 22 February 1944, he was arrested by the Gestapo and interrogated; he was initially sent to Royallieu-Compiègne internment camp, but was later moved to Buchenwald concentration camp.

== Aftermath ==
On 23 October 1944, managing director Georges Suarez was sentenced to death as a collaborationist in the first treason trial held by the Special Court of Justice of the Seine Department. He was accused of attacking the Allies, supporting the German execution of hostages, and condemning members of the resistance. During his trial, which lasted only 90 minutes, a journalist testified that the luxurious beige overcoat Suarez wore was evidence that he was one of the "nouveau riche of the treason".

Georges Suarez was executed by firing squad on 9 November 1944. Paul Chack was convicted and executed one month later.

As Allied forces approached Berlin in 1945, prisoners from Buchenwald were force-marched toward the east, but were eventually abandoned by fleeing prison guards. Robert Desnos managed to walk to Allied-occupied Terezin, Czechoslovakia, where he died of typhus on 8 June 1945, clutching a rose given to him by a nurse.

== Other contributors ==
Félicien Challaye, Achille Dauphin-Meunier, André Juin.

== Related pages ==
- Anglophobia
- Antisemitism
- Collaboration
- Vichy regime
- Je suis partout
- Georges Suarez
- Otto Abetz
