= Henri de La Bastide =

French writer and scholar (1916–1986)

Henri Martin de La Bastide d'Hust (14 December 1916 – 23 May 1986) was a French writer and scholar. He studied at the Institut national des langues et civilisations orientales, of which he was director from 1976 until 1986.

He was a member of the Club de l'horloge.
