= Thomas Paris =

French author (born 1970)

Thomas Paris (born in 1970 in Besançon) is a French author.

== Publications ==
- 1994: Thomas Paris and Eileen Paris, I'll never do to my kids what my parents did to me!: a guide to conscious parenting, Warner Books Inc., (published in German under the title Nicht wie meine Eltern, Scherz, 1999)
- 2002: Le droit d'auteur : l'idéologie et le système, preface by Jean-Daniel Reynaud
- 2003: in collaboration with Maryvonne de Saint-Pulgent and Pierre-Jean Benghozi, Mondialisation et diversité culturelle, IFRI-Institut français des relations internationales
- 2005: Pissenlits et petits oignons, Buchet/Chastel
- 2006: Avec ses moustaches, Buchet/Chastel
- 2015: La Tournée d'adieux, at Buchet/Chastel, ISBN 978-2-283-02890-2
