= Yves Durand (historian) =

French historian

Yves Durand (14 April 1932 – April 2004) was a French historian, professor of modern history at the Sorbonne.

He was a member of the Club de l'horloge.

== Biography ==
Yves Durand is the son of René Durand, a bank manager, and Juliette née Hartely. He studied at the University of Paris Faculty of Humanities, where he became agrégé d'histoire, then docteur ès lettres. He began his career as a teacher at the Lycée de Meaux.

Between 1966 and 1967, he was a senior lecturer at the Sorbonne, then a lecturer in modern and contemporary history at the Faculté des lettres et sciences humaines in Nantes in 1969, the year he joined the Union Nationale Inter-universitaire when it was founded. In 1971, he became lecturer and professor of History at the Nantes University. He was appointed Vice-President in 1976. From 1973 to 1977, he also headed the teaching and research unit of the Centre de recherche sur l'histoire de la France Atlantique.

Yves Durand was rector of the Rouen academy from 1977 to 1979, then of the Aix-Marseille academy from 1979 to 1981. In 1986, he was appointed Professor of Modern History at the University of Paris-Sorbonne University, becoming Emeritus Professor in 1997. From 1986 to 1988, he was adviser to Prime Minister Jacques Chirac on education and research.

He died of cancer on April 21, 2004. His funeral took place on April 24 at Church of St Similien. His collection of 2,000 works was donated to the Institut catholique d'études supérieures university library.
