= Georges Suarez =

French writer, essayist and journalist

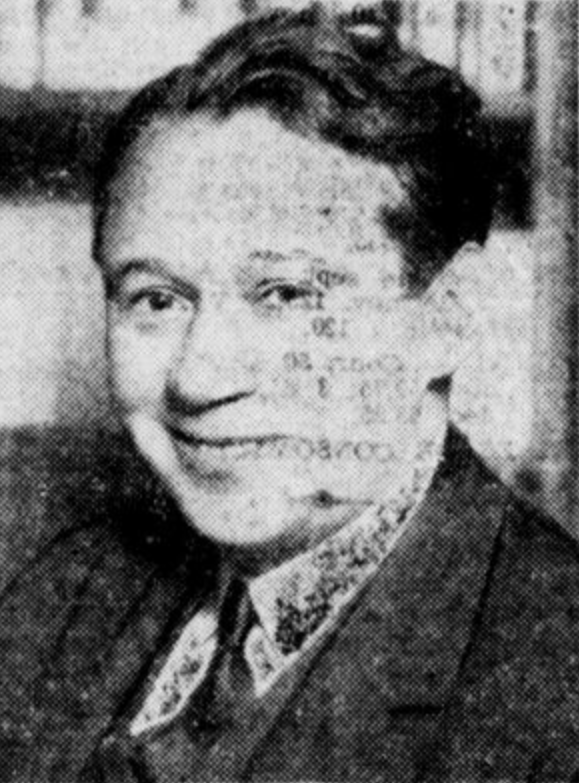
Georges Suarez (1933)

Georges Suarez (8 November 1890 – 9 November 1944), was a French writer, essayist, journalist, and jurist. Initially a pacifist during the rise of Nazi Germany, he later became a right-wing journalist and collaborator. He had been editor of Aujourd'hui, a French newspaper controlled by the Third Reich after the resignation of the writer Henri Jeanson. Suarez was also the biographer of Philippe Pétain, and other figures of the French Third Republic. He was the first journalist sentenced to death during the Épuration légale.

== Biography ==
Suarez was trained as a jurist. He fought in World War I, and afterwards became a correspondent for the agence Havas news agency in Vienna. During this period, he worked with several newspapers including Le Temps and L'Écho de Paris.

=== In the interwar ===
In the 1920s, Suarez started writing several works in collaboration with journalist Joseph Kessel, who remained loyal to Suarez until his death.

Like many of his contemporaries, Suarez adopted an ambiguous political stance over the course of time. Switching back and forth between the left (he was interested in the Cartel des gauches left-wing alliance) and the right (he followed the Stavisky Affair and the riot at the Palais Bourbon in 1934), Suarez preserved a centrist, pacifist and germanophile stance. In 1935, along with Drieu La Rochelle, Paul Marion and Pierre Pucheu, he strongly criticised the republican government, publicly lamenting their inability to solve the economic crisis, and calling for a new technocracy (they used the term "synarchy") which would be capable, according to them, of dispensing with the problems posed by capitalism. Like many of his associates, Suarez became close to the Parti populaire français (PPF) of Jacques Doriot, and, after the French defeat of 1940, collaborationist circles.

He published articles in favour of "synarchism" and "technocratism" such as had been theorised by Georges Lefranc, Georges Albertini and Bertrand de Jouvenel, and under the occupation he condemned the "corruption" and the "conspiracies" of the Third Republic, writing in newspapers like Libération and Aujourd'hui. Suarez' radical positions led him to support the Riom trials of the Vichy regime, trials set up in order to bring to justice those political figures of the Third Republic allegedly responsible for France's defeat of 1940.

=== Vichy France ===
From 1940, Suarez became one of the first biographers of Marshal Philippe Pétain; In 1941 Suarez devoted a further work to him with the provocative title Pétain ou la démocratie? Il faut choisir (Pétain or democracy? You have to choose).

In 1944, despite his collaborationist involvement, Suarez wrote in vain to Compiègne camp's superintendent, Doctor Illers, to ask for the freedom of his friend Robert Desnos, a supporter of the résistance.

== Death sentence ==
Suarez was sentenced to death in 1944; he was shot on 9 November. It was Charles de Gaulle who vowed to execute journalists and writers who had collaborated with the Vichy government. Suarez was the first among those to be executed.

== Works ==
- (with Joseph Kessel), Le Onze mai, Paris, Éditions NRF, 1924.
- (with Joseph Kessel), Au camp des vaincus, ou la Critique du 11 mai, Paris, Éd. NRF, 1924.
- (with Joseph Kessel), Chez M. Paul Faure et M. Charles Maurras, [?], 1926.
- De Poincaré à Poincaré, Paris, [?], 1928.
- Peu d'hommes, trop d'idées ! Et Un entretien avec Charles Maurras par J. Kessel, Paris, De France, 1928 [rééd. Déterna, 2000].
- Une nuit chez Cromwell. Précédé d'un important récit historique de Raymond Poincaré, Paris, Éditions de France, 1930
- La Belgique Vivante, pref. André Tardieu, [?], Éditions Rex, [1932].
- La vie orgueilleuse de Clémenceau. t. 1 Clémenceau. Dans la mêlée, Paris, J. Tallandier, 1932.
- La vie orgueilleuse de Clémenceau. t. 2 Clémenceau. Dans l'action, Paris, J. Tallandier, 1932.
- Les Hommes malades de la paix, Paris, Grasset, 1933.
- Profils de rechange, Paris, Excelsior, 1933.
- La Grande peur du 6 février au Palais-Bourbon, Paris, Grasset, 1934.
- Les Heures héroïques du Cartel, Paris, Grasset, 1934.
- Soixante années d'histoire française. Clemenceau, Paris, Éditions de France, 1934.
- Pour un parti central, Paris, Denoël et Steele, 1936.
- Nos seigneurs et maîtres, Paris, Éditions de France, 1937.
- Briand : sa vie, son œuvre, avec son journal et de nombreux documents inédits, 6. vol. Paris, Plon, 1938-1952.
- Les Accords franco-britanniques économiques et financiers. L’Empire français et la guerre, Paris, Odef, 1940.
- « Préface » à Pierre Dehillotte, Gestapo : l'organisation, les chefs, les agents, l'action de la Gestapo à l'étranger, Paris, Payot, 1940.
- Le maréchal Pétain, Paris, Plon, 1940 [rééd. Déterna, 1999].
- Pétain ou la démocratie ? Il faut choisir, Paris, Grasset, 1941.
- (with Guy Laborde), Agonie de la paix (1935-1939), Paris, Plon, 1942.
- Espagne, pont de l'Europe, Paris, Éditions France-Empire, 1944.
