= Henry de Lesquen =

French retired official, politician and radio director (born 1949)

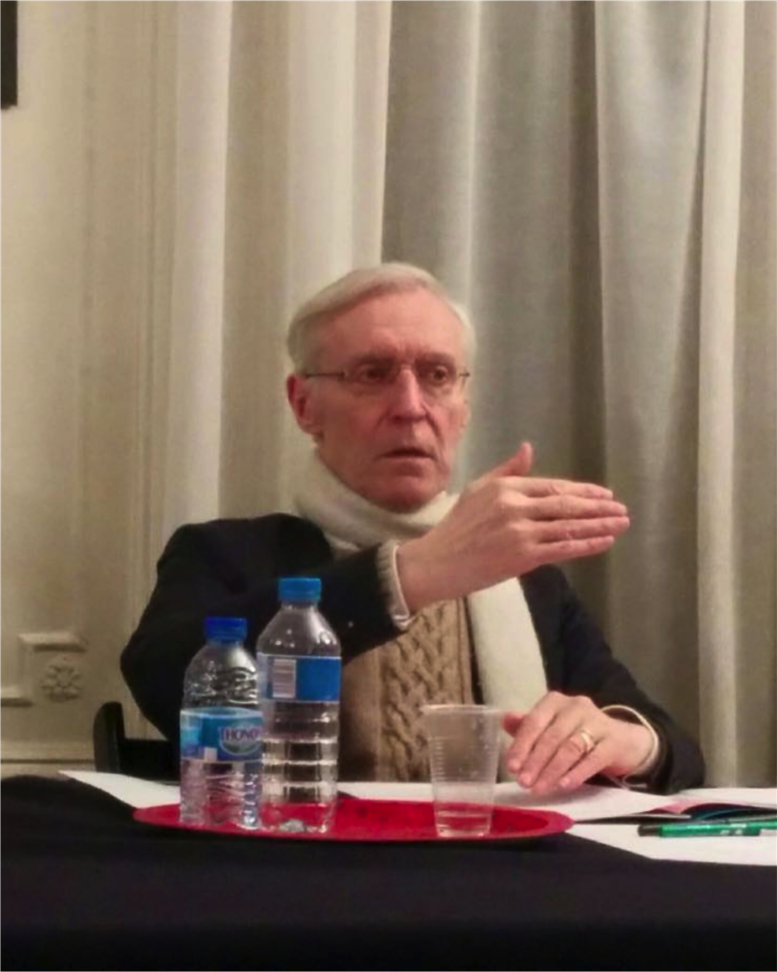
- De Lesquen in 2017
- Born: Henry Bertrand Marie Armand de Lesquen du Plessis-Casso; 1 January 1949; Port-Lyautey, Morocco
- Education: École polytechnique École nationale d'administration
- Occupations: Official, radio director and politician
- Political party: Movement for France, Union of Democrats for the Republic
- Children: François de Lesquen, Roland de Lesquen, Mahaut de Lesquen, Clélie de Lesquen-Jonas
- Website: lesquen.fr

Henry Bertrand Marie Armand de Lesquen du Plessis-Casso (French pronunciation: [ɑ̃ʁi d(ə) lɛskɑ̃]; born 1 January 1949) is a French-Moroccan politician. A retired official and former radio director, De Lesquen has been the president of the Carrefour de l'Horloge, a national-liberal think tank, since 1985. A blogger and YouTuber since the 2010s, he has participated in popularising the concept of "remigration" in France.

== Biography ==
=== Early life and education ===
Henry Bertrand Marie Armand de Lesquen du Plessis-Casso was born on 1 January 1949 in Port-Lyautey, Morocco, then a French protectorate, the son of Pierre de Lesquen du Plessis-Casso, a general of the French Army and Anne-Marie Huon de Kermadec. Both his father and mother were from noble Breton families. De Lesquen's maternal grandmother, Camille Medina, was born Guatemalan and naturalized French.

De Lesquen entered Polytechnique in 1968, then earned a bachelor in economics and joined the École nationale d'administration (ENA) in 1974.

=== Carrefour de l'Horloge ===
With his friend from ENA Jean-Yves Le Gallou, de Lesquen founded the Club de l'Horloge in July 1974. Criticizing the meta-politics of Alain de Benoist's GRECE, the Club de l'Horloge aimed at concrete results, favoring entryism inside the French mainstream right-wing parties of the period: the Rally for the Republic (RPR) and the Union for French Democracy.

The book La Politique du vivant ("The Politics of living"), published in 1979 under the direction of de Lesquen, drew influence from GRECE theories on sociobiology, genetic determinism and social darwinism. The same year, he participated with Alain de Benoist in the French TV literary talk show Apostrophes about the Nouvelle Droite. Since the years 1979–80, the Club de l'Horloge has distanced itself from GRECE, promoting instead an "economic liberalism strongly tainted with nationalism."

=== Public career ===
From 1974 to 1978, de Lesquen has been in charge of the program bureau for the French highways at the Ministry of Equipment. He became head of the bureau of energies, raw materials and chemistry at the Ministry of Finances from 1979 to 1983. De Lesquen has been also a lecturer in economics at Sciences Po from 1978 to 1987.

In 1984, he became deputy director of finances for the city of Paris. In this position, he refused in December 1986 to observe a minute's silence after the death of Malik Oussekine and, according to witnesses, left the room during the ceremony. In 1987, he was nominated by mayor of Paris Jacques Chirac secretary-general of the Office Public d'Aménagement et de Construction (OPAC) and remained at this position until 1990; he had been accused of enacting unofficial ethnic quotas. In 2001, de Lesquen became a municipal councilor in Versailles, where he spoke out against the city's public housing projects.

In 2007, he was elected president of right-wing radio station Radio Courtoisie, from which he was ousted in 2017 after the controversies surrounding his presidential campaign.

== Positions ==
=== 2017 presidential election ===
At the end of 2015, de Lesquen announced his candidacy to the 2017 presidential election. In the following months, he attracted media attention by making a number of provocative proposals, claiming that as president, he would destroy the Eiffel Tower; "burn" France's labour code, which he consider an obstacle to entrepreneurship and as stifling individual liberty, and annex Belgium and Luxembourg. De Lesquen also added that he would ban "negro music" from government-sponsored broadcasts—in his view the "music with a sexual rhythm, expression of the soul of the African people"; including hip-hop, metal and rock and roll, which he described as "white people's negro music, that appeals to the reptilian brain".

He was eventually sentenced to a 16,000-euro fine in January 2017 for incitement to racial hatred and holocaust denial. In March 2017, de Lesquen withdrew his candidacy in favor of LR runner François Fillon, against the "cosmopolitan oligarchy" and to "stand in the way of Macron".

=== Online fame and influence ===
Lesquen runs a YouTube channel, totalling several million views, in which he expresses his political theories and has attracted a lot of young people who label themselves the Jeunesses Lesquenistes ("Lesquenist Youth"). He founded a political movement in 2018, the National-Liberal Party (PNL; French "Parti National-Libéral"), which aims at promoting national liberal ideas, and restoring traditional French values and liberal economics through ideological influence rather than elected office.

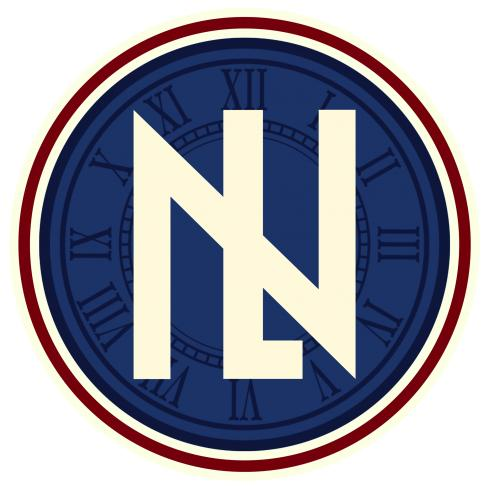
Logo of his National-liberal party

Using irony and provocative symbolism akin to the Alt-Right movement, the logo of his party imitates the Wolfsangel used by the 2nd SS Panzer Division Das Reich in WWII. Through his online videos, Lesquen participated in popularizing the concept of "remigration" in France and spreading racialist theories built on anthropologist Carleton S. Coon's works. De Lesquen also introduced the word "candaule" as a French equivalent for the Alt-Right term "cuckservative". Similar to its American counterpart, the term is used as a distinction between the "true ring-wingers", who "oppose anti-racist laws" and "favor remigration", and the "losers of the right".

=== Relations with the FN ===
He described Marine Le Pen as "a leftist woman entertaining herself hearing negro music in nightclubs" and an "incult" and the National Rally as a "pederastic lupanar."

=== Others ===
At the end of 2018, he decided to support the "Yellow Vests", denouncing over-taxation and describing the movement as made up of "French people from French ancestors".

He stated that slavery was a historical necessity due to the low economic and technological levels and that Black slaves were relatively well-treated.

He described transsexual individuals as "perverts" and "mentally diseased" deserving psychiatry.

In March 2020, Lesquen stated "there is worse than coronavirus: judeovirus" at a meeting of the "Swiss Resistance" organization.

== Private life ==
Henry de Lesquen is a traditionalist Catholic. He broke off relations with his daughter, Clélie, after she married a Jew.

== See also ==
- Alt-right
- Carrefour de l'Horlorge
- Racialism
