= Jean Ferré =

Right-wing political journalist

- Born: 29 May 1929; Saint-Pierre-les-Églises, France
- Died: 10 October 2006 (aged 77); Saint-Germain-en-Laye, France
- Education: ESME Sudria
- Occupation: Journalist

Jean Ferré (French pronunciation: [ʒɑ̃ fɛʁe]; 29 May 1929, in Saint-Pierre-les-Églises, now part of Chauvigny, Vienne – 10 October 2006, in Saint-Germain-en-Laye) was a French art historian and a right-wing political journalist. He was also the founder of the Paris-based Radio Courtoisie in 1987.

== Early years ==
From 1942 Ferré performed his secondary studies at the Collège Saint-Stanislas in Poitiers, a Jesuit school. After his Baccalauréat, he undertook mathélem, then studied in the École spéciale de mécanique et d'électricité. He did not finish his studies. Towards the end of 1945, he constructed a shortwave transceiver with double frequency change and lamps. This taste for radio was to last his whole life.

In 1949, Ferré became an amateur radio licensee with callsign F9OV. He frequently contacted K2UN, an American enthusiast better known as Barry Goldwater, who would later run unsuccessfully for President of the United States of America.

K2UN was broadcasting from the roof of the UN building with highly effective equipment; he was always surprised to achieve contact with Ferré, who only had a 10-watt transmitter. When K2UN came to France, Ferré asked to meet him – the former remembered their contact. for Barry Goldwater, Ferré was "Mister 10 watts".

=== First steps in journalism ===
In 1952, Jean Ferré crossed the Río de Oro with a friend, and paid a visit to the forbidden city of Smara. He would report this adventure in Au désert interdit (to the forbidden desert). In the same year, Ferré developed a great friendship with Bernard Grasset; for two years, they had dinner together almost every night. It was Grasset who engendered Ferré's appreciation of Henry de Montherlant's work.

In early 1956, Ferré participated in the weekly magazine Notre Époque, created at the behest of Catholic investors with the intention of it being a right-wing counterweight to La Vie Catholique illustrée. It ceased to appear, however, after five months.

In June of the same year, he created the monthly news magazine C'est-à-dire. The editorial line was staunchly right-wing; the format was based on Time. Participants in the creation of C'est-à-dire were the historian Jean-François Chiappe, Jean-Luc de Carbuccia, and another man of the theatre, Jacques Hébertot. C'est-à-dire also benefited from the support and friendship of Louis Pauwels and the participation of Nicole de Buron.

=== Ferré and Algeria – the Spanish exile ===
Jean Ferré was a supporter of Algérie française. On this point he was in disagreement with de Gaulle. He had demanded that his team avoid polemics; however, Jean-François Chiappe wrote an article aggressively calling de Gaulle into question, describing him as a "paranoiac" with "intermittent delirium". The magazine was seized.

Ferré continued for some time to publish it in the form of a confidential letter, which was itself seized in turn. In late 1960, Ferré paid a visit to General Salan who had fled to Spain. From this time onward, they would be collaborators. On 19 or 20 April 1961, it was Ferré who informed Salan of the plan for the Algiers putsch of 1961. This relationship made Ferré a wanted man, and he went underground.

In late September 1961, wanted for his participation in the putsch, for his support of the Organisation armée secrète and for offending the head of state, de Gaulle, Ferré was stopped and brought to La Santé Prison, where he began a hunger strike.

He was then given the status of interné administratif (administrative detainee) according to the formula of Roger Frey, the interior minister of the time, which applied to a suspect who had not yet been brought to trial. Under this provision, Ferré was imprisoned in the Saint-Maurice-l'Ardoise military camp in Saint-Laurent-des-Arbres in the Gard department.

In 1962, he was freed, but faced a new threat from French justice. However, Judge Schweig rescued him from immediate arrest and from the penalty of 10 years imprisonment which had already been set out for him; thanks to which he avoided a trial and went into exile in Spain, where he associated with prominent Franquists, notably including the caudillo's own sister.

He also built a friendship with the first president of the senate of democratic Spain, Antonio Fontán. He was productive in Madrid, particular in his work on Antoine Watteau, a four-volume study which would be published in 1972.

=== Figaro Magazine ===
On returning to France, Ferré got back with his old friends from C’est-à-dire. He resumed his journalistic activities, notably as a radio and television columnist at Le Figaro, and subsequently Figaro Magazine, of which he was a founder with Pauwels.

== Radio Solidarité and Radio Courtoisie ==
In September 1981, Bernadette d'Angevilliers and Philippe Malaud, former minister under Charles de Gaulle and Georges Pompidou, created Radio Solidarité, with the support of Yannick Urrien. This free radio station had associations with Rassemblement pour la République and with the Union pour la démocratie française and was strongly opposed to the political left of François Mitterrand. Thanks to his radio columns, which were favourable to Radio Solidarité, Ferré was noticed by d'Angevilliers, who proposed that he collaborate with them.

In May and June 1982, Ferré created the broadcast formula of the Libre Journal: an hour and a half programme each evening based around a guest belonging to the political right. Ferré proposed that the radio should be open to "all people of the right"; pursuant to this, Serge de Beketch was invited to direct a regular Wednesday evening broadcast. However, following the 1984 European elections, de Beketch exposed the radio station to the accusation of having helped the political breakthrough of the Front National. De Beketch was ordered to leave; Ferré sought to defend de Beketch and was also dismissed.

At that point Ferré created the "Radio Solidarité listeners' defense committee" (CDARS). It was under this name, declared to the Paris police prefecture on 12 December 1985, that he founded Radio Courtoisie (courtoisie means courtesy). Radio Courtoisie made its first broadcast on 7 November 1987.

From this day until the end of his life, led Radio Courtoisie devoting all his time to it. Every Monday evening he hosted in person a Libre Journal without interruption until 31 July 1996, the date of his last broadcast.

He died on 10 October 2006, aged 77, following renal cancer.

== Positions ==
Ferré always asserted his opposition to what he called pensée unique and to the ideology of political correctness. Being himself aligned with Charles Maurras, Ferré was sympathetic to royalty and advocated traditionalist Catholicism. He continually expressed his desire to defend French language and civilisation. Firmly on the right, he presented himself as anti-communist. In this context, Radio Courtoisie could have been conceived by him as a means of advancing his ideas. As he himself asserted on air, he hoped to "rally all patriots" and reconcile all Frenchmen.

Ferré willingly defined himself as a humanist. Thus he condemned vigorously the murderous violence of all totalitarianism, that of Hitler and of Nazism but also that of Stalin and communism. Defending a Christian conception of the right to life, he was as opposed to the death penalty as he was to voluntary termination of pregnancy. On many occasions he invited on air Professor Jérôme Lejeune and representatives of his group Fondation Jérôme Lejeune.

== Alain Decaux on Ferré ==
You are of the right, I am of the left. On several occasions you have reminded your readers of this. You have even explained that I am of the left that died in 1917, that of the 19th century: I approve. But you, the man of the right, despise the death penalty, declare hatred outmoded, are as skeptical about automatisms as a Jacobin, you are as scandalised as the feminists about the excision and infibulation imposed on millions of women in the name of intolerance clothed as religious dogma, you proclaim your tenderness towards the great Louise Weiss, incarnation of the French republican and democrat, you defend Monsieur Jourdain against Molière because he speaks, like a teacher of the third republic: "A beautiful thing rather than to know something". And you, who declare "Politics first!", don't catch fire when it comes to defending Watteau from ignoramuses and the tradesman who in their work refuse to separate the wheat from the chaff. The truth is that you are steeped in the true culture, that which makes us tell Rivarol that "what isn't clear isn't French". You love writers and painters, painters no doubt more than writers. But I won't quibble with you. The breath of the spirit holds you as much as the games of the spirit. You are alive with an insatiable curiosity, always ready to learn something new and to marvel at what you learn. (Alain Decaux, postscript of the book Fidèle au poste.)

== Works ==
- Au désert interdit, 1st edition: A. Bonne, Paris, 1954 [pagination non connue]. Reedition in facsimile (with a preface by General de Boisboissel and a postscript by the author): L'Âge d'Homme, Lausanne et Paris, 2000, 235 p. + 12 p. de planches ISBN 2-8251-1375-1
- Watteau (4 volumes), Éditions Athena, 1972
- Lettre ouverte à un amateur d'art pour lui vendre la mèche, Albin Michel, coll. Lettre ouverte, Paris, 1974, 214 p. ISBN 2-226-00139-5
- Vie et œuvre de Jean-Antoine Watteau, Éditions de Vergennes, coll. "A l'école des grands peintres" No. 2 (sous la direction de Gilles Néret), Paris, 1980, 56 p.
- Watteau : 60 chefs-d'œuvre (with preface by Jean Guitton and postscript by Alain Decaux), Éditions Viloe, Paris, 1984, 68 p. ISBN 2-7191-0223-7
- Fidèle au poste: journal d'un critique 1978–1986, Albin Michel, Paris, 1986, 382 p. ISBN 2-226-02531-6

== Reactions to Ferré's death ==
- Notice of Ferré's death, and a review of the press, on the Radio Courtoisie blog
- Un vrai messager de la liberté, article by Jean-Gilles Malliarakis in his L'insolent bulletin on 12 October 2006
