= Riaumont =

Hill in Pas-de-Calais, France

Coordinates: 50.4165°N 2.7873°E

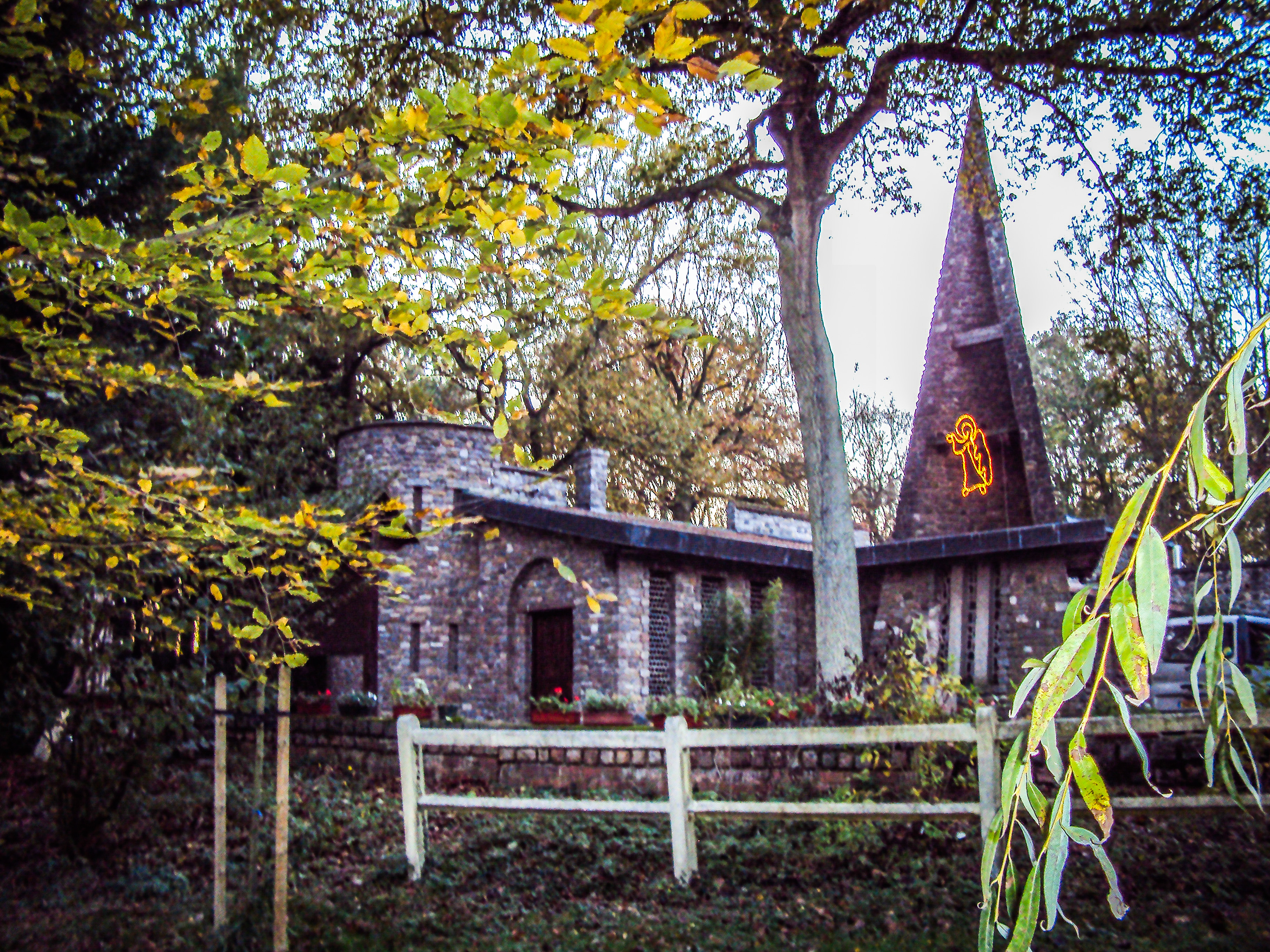

Riaumont (literally meaning "royal mountain") is located on the hill of Riaumont, in the commune of Liévin, in the Pas-de-Calais département in northern France, in the former province of Artois. It refers to a Benedictine monastic community, a children's residential village, and a Scout group.

== History ==
The village and religious community was first directed since its formation in the 1960s by Father Revet, until his death in 1986.

Built for young people at the request of the DDASS (the French social services) and the judges of Pas-de-Calais, this centre and independent school accepts children with disabilities like autism. The establishment was a main centre for children placed under the supervision of the DDASS. The French State financed the construction and the maintenance of the buildings as well as the teachers' salaries. The children have worked on the various building sites (receptions, farm, chapel, scout building, monastery, etc.), sometimes as a practical placement of vocational teaching courses, helping to transform the initial reception into a Catholic monastic centre. In parallel, Father Revet determined to set up a religious scouting movement.

In 1979, the DDASS found serious problems (poor hygiene, food safety conditions and maltreatment), and decided to close the centre in April 1982. The establishment now accommodates children removed by their families, in particular children originating from South-east Asia.

== The religious order ==
The religious community of Sainte-Croix (Holy-Cross of Riaumont) celebrates the liturgy according to the 1962 form of the Roman Rite, under the provisions of the motu proprio Summorum Pontificum. Its states an attribute of a twofold origin: Benedictine (the monks are Benedictine Oblates) and the scout movement. The frieze and the dress of ceremony refer to religious military orders. The main symbol is the potent, distinguished cross of the scouts of France and originating from the cross of kingdom of Jerusalem.

== The Children Village ==
People can see the works of the painter Gerard Ambroselli like the fresco in the canopy but also of the drawings and paintings originally from draughtsman and illustrator Pierre Joubert. Scouting is ubiquitous and the three principal buildings do the activities: "Godefroy de Bouillon", "Beaumanoir" and "Cedars".

=== The boarding school ===
The children from sixth to ninth grade are accommodated with the boarding school Holy Jean Bosco, located in the building "Beaumanoir". The pupils need to be prepared for more than ten years for the official examination of Brevet des collèges which is the first French diploma, obtained after 4 years of junior high school in general and technical areas. The children have to do the "Hattemer course" (mail-given / correspondence course) and the courses are given by the brothers of Riaumont as well as by external supply teachers. The classes are often small between five and about fifteen pupils and they are all the "boys of Riaumont" but the courses of catechism are also open to other children of different surroundings. The extracurricular activities are extensive: do-it-yourself, froissartage, penmanship and printing works, film club, games, dealing with the farm and the animals, singing, brass band and music, reading in the library, heraldic workshop, sports activities, etc.

=== Pedagogy ===
The pedagogy of the school is presented in the form of a return to the Christian realism, inspired by scouting founded by Robert Baden-Powell. The teaching objective of the school is to carry out a full Christian education by taking it as a starting point of the realism thomist and the pedagogy of scouting. It is a question of showing, by the practice, the benefits of the traditional scouting which joins with the wisdom of a philosophical thomist in to original reality, by the practice of manual work. Concerning pedagogy scouts compare some to the description given by the historian of scouting Jean-Jacques Gauthé in a newspaper article Le Monde on September 2, 1998, entitled the Little Soldiers of scouting: "Defense of the true scouting, since they estimate that this one was denatured by the Scouts de France [...] defense of the true faith through the mass of saint Pie V [...] dispute of the values resulting from the Revolution of 1789 [...] constant references to the counter-revolution of which they relate to the topics [...] the values which they defend are those of the "ongoing beyond of oneself" by demanding physical activities, virility sometimes resulting in a paramilitary style [...] the testimony to form a Catholic elite is manifest"

== Scouting ==
Stemming from a troop of Scouts de France in the 1960s, the Association des Scouts et Guides de Riaumont (Association of the Scouts and Guides of Riaumont) passed successively by Scouts d'Europe, Scouts Saint-George and the Association Française de Scouts et Guides Catholiques. It has been a federation affiliated for 15 years to the Eclaireurs Neutres de France (ENF), a movement of Scouting founded in 1947, approved by the ministry for Youth and Sports. Each weekend, as well as the camp starting every July, the Scout units of Riaumont (willow, wolf cubs, guides, scouts, guides elder and teamster) are opened to all children. The village has some curiosities which exploited with the Scouting, such monument with the memory of the Scouts who died in France, a "Scout" museum which gathers many badges and parts of uniform resulting from various associations or uniforms and objects which have may belonged to Scout chaplains, or with chaplains of the trenches, lasting until the First World War. In addition, for the researchers and academics, the "Scouting Laboratory" gathers many works, newspapers and readings on Scouting.

== See also ==
- Site of Riaumont
- Rover's training
- Riaumont: citadel of the hope. Life and the work of the Father Revet (Elor Editions, 1991). By Remi Fountain, journalist with the daily newspaper "Present "
- The Remnant newspaper 2005 Chartres Pilgrimage and the little Catholic Girls from Riaumont.
- Documentary on the Child abuse at Riaumont
