= Daniel Garrigue =

French politician

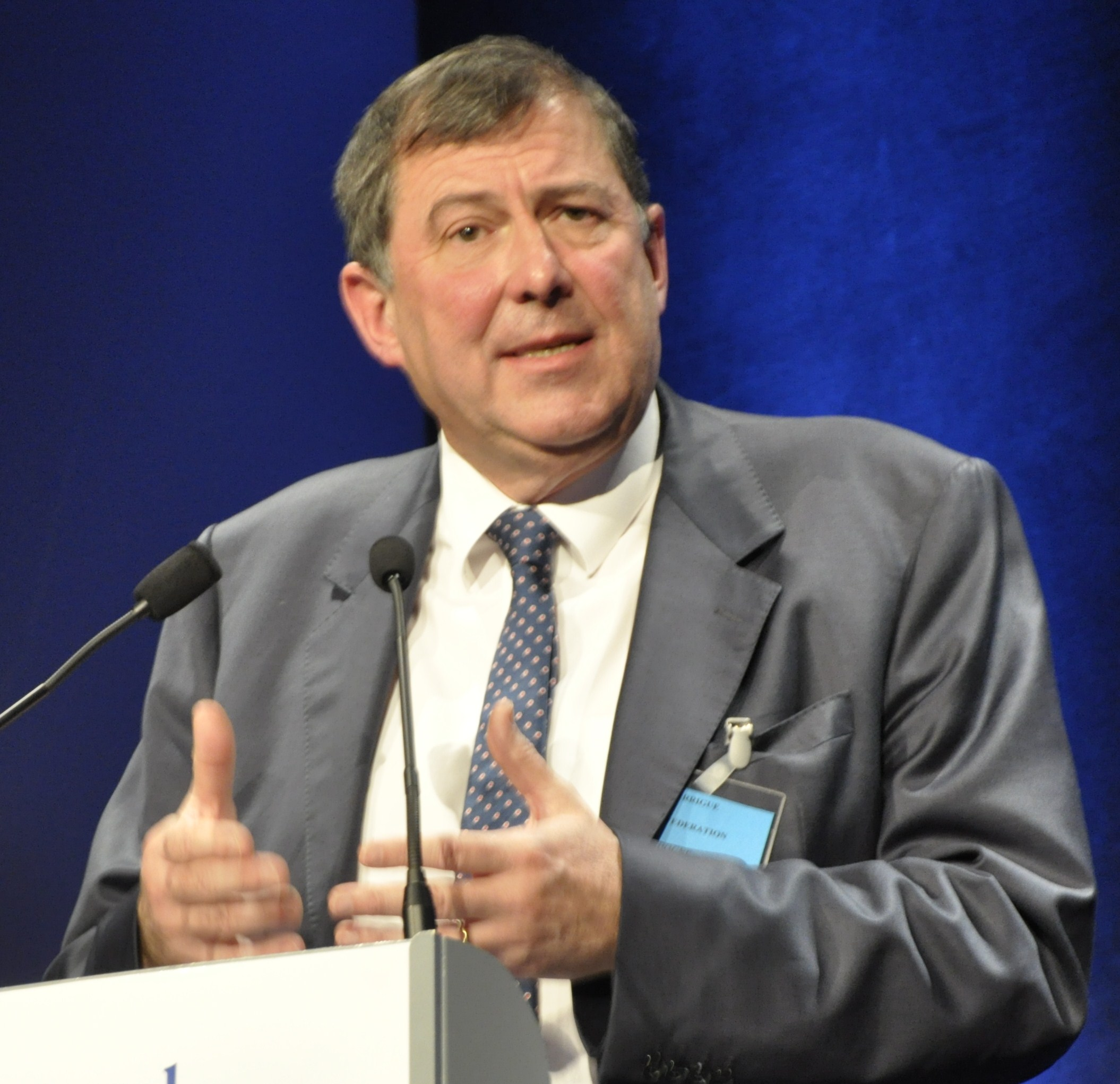
Daniel Garrigue

Daniel Garrigue (born 4 April 1948 in Talence) was a member of the National Assembly of France. He represented Dordogne's 2nd constituency from 2002 to 2012 as a member of the Union for a Popular Movement. He was the sole member of the Assembly to vote against the French ban on full length Islamic veils stating that, "To fight an extremist behavior, we risk slipping toward a totalitarian society."

In 1974, was a founding member of the Club de l'horloge.
