= Pierre Chaunu =

French historian (1923-2009)

- Born: 17 August 1923; Belleville-sur-Meuse, France
- Died: 22 October 2009 (aged 86); Caen, France
- Occupation: Historian
- Spouse: Huguette Chaunu
- Children: Emmanuel Chaunu

Pierre Chaunu (French: [pjɛʁ ʃony]; 17 August 1923 – 22 October 2009) was a French historian. His specialty was Latin American history; he also studied French social and religious history of the 16th, 17th, and 18th centuries. A leading figure in French quantitative history as the founder of "serial history", he was professor emeritus at Paris IV-Sorbonne, a member of the Institut de France, and a commander of the Légion d'Honneur. A convert to Protestantism from Roman Catholicism, he defended his far-right views most notably in a longtime column in Le Figaro and on Radio Courtoisie.

== Biography ==
A native of Belleville-sur-Meuse, "on the outskirts of the battle of Verdun" in his own words, and raised by his uncle and aunt, Pierre René Chaunu was deeply scarred by his own family tragedies, which explained the reasons for his conservatism. This conservatism led him to join the far-right Cercle national Jeanne-d'Arc, an organisation affiliated to the National Front of Jean-Marie Le Pen. Despite this membership in an openly far-right organisation, he nonetheless self-identified as a right-wing Gaullist throughout his life.

Pierre Chaunu taught in the lycée of Bar-le-Duc in 1947, where he was a professor of history. He was admitted to the École des hautes études hispaniques in 1948 and stayed in Madrid and Seville until 1951. Strongly influenced by Fernand Braudel, who was his mentor, and the Annales School (where he was secretary to Lucien Febvre), Chaunu defended his dissertation on Séville et l’Atlantique in 1954. Nonetheless, Braudel denied him entry into the sixth section of the École practique des hautes études.

He was professor at the lycée at Vanves (1951–1956), part-time lecturer at the faculté des lettres in Paris (1956), researcher at the French National Center for Scientific Research (CNRS), elected member of CNRS after 1957 and of the Comité consultant des universités, and in 1959 chargé d’enseignement (assistant professor). In 1960, Chaunu became maitre de conferences (associate professor) in 1960 and full professor in 1962 at the University of Caen Lower Normandy, where he founded the Centre de recherche d’histoire quantitative in 1966. He was named professor of modern history at Paris-Sorbonne University in 1970.

Beginning in 1976, he was a member of the Conseil économique et social's section for the adaptation of research technique and for economic information, and from 1980 he was a member of the historical section of the Conseil scientifique of CNRS. In 1982, he was elected as a member of the historical and geographical section of the Académie des sciences morales et politiques. He became a member of the Haut conseil a l’intégration (High Council on Immigration) in 1994. From 1988 to 1990, he was president of the Fédération nationale des syndicats autonomes de l’enseignment supérieur.

Until 2005, he directed the weekly broadcast of "Les Mardis de la mémoire" on Radio Courtoisie. From the early 1980s he had a column in "Le Figaro." Pierre Chaunu converted to Protestantism as an adult (having previously been a Roman Catholic). He was a lay preacher in the temple at Courseulles-sur-Mer (Reformed Church of France) and a committee member of the Société de l'Histoire du Protestantisme Français. He was also the father of six children, including the illustrator and cartoonist Emmanuel Chaunu (born in 1966). He was a commander of the Légion d’honneur.

== Death ==
Chaunu died at Caen on 22 October 2009, aged 86.

== Works ==
The central thesis of several of his works, including "La Peste blanche", is that the contemporary West is committing suicide because of demographic decline and low birth rate; hence the subtitle, "How can the suicide of the West be avoided?" In evoking the word "plague", the historian very explicitly recalled the terrible epidemic that decimated the European population in the fourteenth century. He equally echoed the study of Latin America that made his reputation: South America experienced a steep drop in population at the arrival of the Spanish. From 80 million, the population went to 10 million in the span of half a century. (This claim has provoked very significant controversy; see e.g., Henige, who argues that the population at the relevant dates is essentially unknowable.) Thus, according to Chaunu, the demographic index became a prime indicator to understand the rise and fall of civilizations. The historian maintained that population growth could reverse itself rapidly, to the point of resulting in the phenomena of near-disappearance of some peoples.

== Influence ==
Chaunu had an important impact on historiography, whether with regard to quantitative history, his studies of Latin America, or the social and religious history of France during the Ancien Régime.

== Publications ==
=== Books ===
- Histoire de l'Amérique latine, Paris, PUF, "Que sais-je?", 1949. Réédition en 2009.
- Séville et l'Atlantique (1504–1650), Paris, SEVPEN, 12 volumes, 1955–1960. (Prix de Loubat, 1962).
- Les Philippines et le Pacifique des Ibériques, Paris, SEVPEN, 2 volumes, 1960–1966.
- L'Amérique et les Amériques de la préhistoire à nos jours, Paris, Armand Colin, 1964.
- La Civilisation de l'Europe classique, Paris, Arthaud, 1966.
- L'Expansion européenne du XIII^{e} et XV^{e} siècles, Paris, PUF, 1969. (English translation European expansion in the later Middle Ages, Amsterdam, North Holland Publishing.)
- Conquête et exploitation des nouveaux mondes, Paris, PUF, 1969.
- La Civilisation de l'Europe des Lumières, Paris, Arthaud, 1971.
- L'Espagne de Charles Quint, Paris, SEDES, 2 volumes, 1973.
- Démographie historique et système de civilisation, Rome, EFR, 1974.
- Histoire, science sociale, Paris, SEDES, 1974.
- Le Temps des Réformes, Paris, Fayard, 1975.
- De l'histoire à la prospective, Paris, Robert Laffont, 1975.
- Les Amériques, XVI^{e} et XVIII^{e} siècles, Paris, Armand Colin, 1976.
- La peste blanche (with Georges Suffert), Paris, Gallimard, 1976.
- Séville et l'Amérique aux XVI^{e} et XVII^{e} siècles, Paris, Flammarion, 1977.
- La Mort à Paris (XVI^{e} et XVII^{e} siècles, Paris, Fayard, 1978.
- Histoire quantitative, histoire sérielle, Paris, Armand Colin, 1978.
- Le sursis, Paris, Robert Laffont, 1978.
- La France ridée, Paris, Pluriel, 1979.
- Un futur sans avenir, Histoire et population, Calmann-Lévy,1979.
- Histoire et imagination. La transition, Paris, PUF, 1980.
- Église, culture et société. Réforme et Contre-Réforme (1517–1620), Paris, SEDES, 1980.
- Histoire et décadence, Paris, Perrin, 1981. (Grand Prix Goubert, 1982).
- La France, Paris, Robert Laffont, 1982.
- Pour l'histoire, Paris, Perrin, 1984.
- L'Aventure de la Réforme. Le monde de Jean Calvin, Paris, Desclée de Brouwer, 1986. (English translation, The Reformation, Gloucester, Sutton.)
- Apologie par l'histoire, Paris, Œil, 1988.
- Le Grand Déclassement, Paris, Robert Laffont, 1989.
- Reflets et miroir de l'histoire, Economica, Paris, 1990.
- Histoire économique et sociale de la France. Tome 1, 1450-1660, (with Ernest Labrousse) PUF, "Quadrige", 1993.
- Colomb ou la logique de l'imprévisible, Paris, F. Bourin, 1993.
- Baptême de Clovis, baptême de la France, (in collaboration), Paris, Balland, 1996.
- Le Basculement religieux de Paris au XVIII^{e} siècle, (in collaboration), Paris, Fayard, 1998.
- Charles Quint, (with Michèle Escamilla), Paris, Fayard, 2000.
- La femme et Dieu, (with Jacques Renard), Paris, Fayard, 2001.
- Essai de prospective démographique, (with Huguette Chaunu and Jacques Renard), Paris, Fayard, 2003.
- Des curés aux entrepreneurs: la Vendée au XX^{e} siècle, Centre Vendéen de Recherches Historiques, 2004.
- Le livre noir de la Révolution française, Cerf, 2008.

=== Article ===
- La philosophie et l'histoire, (with Roger Arnaldez) in Jean-François Mattéi, Le Discours philosophique, volume IV of the Encyclopédie philosophique universelle, Paris, PUF, 1998.
