= Bruno Mégret =

French politician

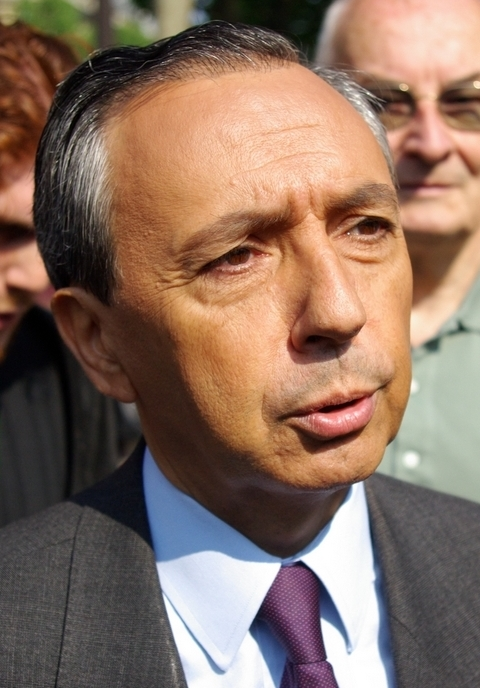

Member of the European Parliament
- In office 1989–1999
- Constituency: France

Member of the National Assembly
- In office 1986–1988
- Constituency: Isère

Personal details
- Born: 4 April 1949 (age 77) Paris, France
- Party: MNR (1998–present)
- Other political affiliations: FN (1988–1998); CAR (1982–1988); RPR (1976–1982)

Bruno Mégret (French: [me.ɡʁɛ]; born 4 April 1949) is a French former nationalist politician. He was the leader of the Mouvement National Républicain political party, but retired in 2008 from all political action.

== Youth and studies ==
Born in Paris, Mégret studied at the École Polytechnique and at the École Nationale des Ponts et Chaussées, and is by profession a senior civil servant. He also holds a Master's degree from the University of California, Berkeley. A graduate of the armoured cavalry school of Saumur, he is also a reserve army captain.

Mégret was ranked 317th at the competition for entrance at École Polytechnique in 1969, and since at that time only 300 candidates were admitted every year, he could enter only because some students preferred to study at the slightly more prestigious École Normale Supérieure and turned down the École Polytechnique. However, at École Polytechnique, he proved to be a very dedicated student and was ranked 18th at the end of the studies. This enabled him to choose between the École des Mines and the École Nationale des Ponts et Chaussées to finish his engineering studies. After graduating from the École Nationale des Ponts et Chaussées, he spent the academic year 1974–1975 in Berkeley and obtained a Master of Science. He then returned to France to work for the Ministère de l'Équipement.

== The Club de l'Horloge ==
In 1975, Mégret met Yvan Blot at the Commissariat Général du Plan, who invited him to join the Club de l'Horloge. At the Club de l'Horloge, he became friends with Jean-Claude Bardet and Jean-Yves Le Gallou, who, with Yvan Blo, were also members of the GRECE. In 1977, Mégret started to work as an engineer on highway construction at the Direction Départementale de l'Équipement (DDE) of Essonne. During this period, he contributed to the publications of the Club de l'Horloge. In 1979, he became technical advisor to the Minister of Cooperation Robert Galley. He also joined the Rassemblement pour la République (conservative political party) and was a conservative candidate for legislative elections in 1981 against Michel Rocard in Conflans-Sainte-Honorine.

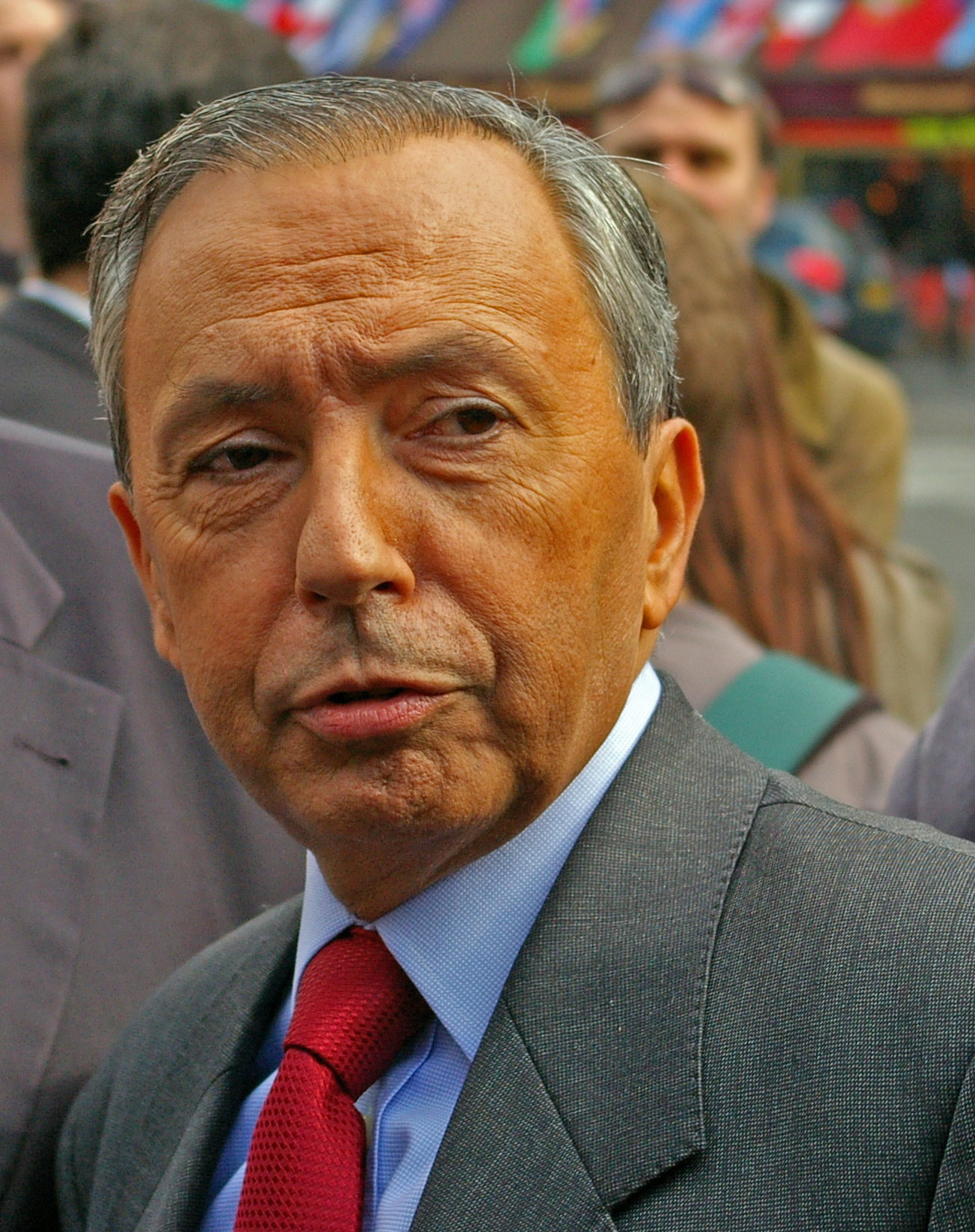
Mégret in 2007

In 1981, after the defeat of the conservatives in legislative elections, finding the RPR too moderate, and realizing that not being a graduate from the École Nationale d'Administration like Jacques Toubon or Jean-François Mancel or Alain Juppé was slowing down his political career in the Rassemblement pour la République, he went on to create the Comités d'Action Républicaine (CAR). However, the appearance of the Front National at the European Parliament elections of 1984, shattered the hopes of the CAR, which did not even manage to have a list of candidates for these elections.

== In the National Front and the MNR ==
In 1985, Mégret joined Jean-Marie Le Pen's National Front (FN, a nationalist political party). In 1986, he was elected to the French National Assembly, representing Isère. A rival of Jean-Pierre Stirbois, then general secretary of the FN (who died in 1988), he organised Le Pen's election campaign in 1987 and became the number two (délégué général) in the movement.

He was a member of the European Parliament for the FN from 1989 to 1999. In 1989, Mégret created the Institut de formation nationale, the Centre d'études et d'argumentaires, the magazine Identité, the conseil scientifique and the publishing house Editions Nationales to elaborate the doctrine and diffuse the ideas of the Front National. His friends of the Club de l'Horloge, Jean-Yves Le Gallou, Jean-Claude Bardet, Yvan Blot and Jean-Jacques Mourreau of the CAR also secured key positions in the hierarchy of the Front National.

However, the relationship between Le Pen and Mégret turned sour during the following decade. Mégret and others inside the Front started criticising Le Pen's "extremist" positions, which, they argued, prevented the Front from obtaining political executive positions. Moreover, Mégret started to become very popular with the party members, winning large support against his rival Bruno Gollnisch, who had been made vice-president and general secretary of the Front National by Le Pen in 1995.

On 9 February 1997, Mégret's wife, Catherine Mégret, was elected mayor of Vitrolles. Following the social unrest of November–December 1995, Mégret developed a strategy of creating new unions (FN-RATP, FN-TCL, FN-Poste, Mouvement pour une Education Nationale, FN-Police) and professional organisations tied to the Front National to increase the audience of the party. This strategy contrasted sharply with the previous traditional anti-union stance of the Front National.

In 1998, Mégret split from the Front National and founded, with Jean-Yves Le Gallou, the Mouvement National Républicain.

He received 2.33% of the vote in the first round of the 2002 French presidential election. Mégret endorsed Jean-Marie Le Pen in the runoff against Jacques Chirac. He also supported Le Pen in the 2007 presidential election.

After he was sentenced to 8 months of probation, an 8000 Euro fine and a one-year ban from standing in any election for defalcation of public funds, he resigned in 2008 from the political field. He used money from the town Vitrolles to support his 2002 presidential run.

In 2022 he voiced support for the candidacy of Éric Zemmour in the 2022 French presidential election, judging that Zemmour "embodies the right path for our ideas and for France". He criticised the leadership of Marine Le Pen for what Mégret perceives to be the "de-demonisation and then standardisation" of the Rassemblement National, judging her to have 'eroded' the party's firm stance on issues relating to security and identity.

== Political career ==
Electoral mandates

Member of the National Assembly of France for Isère : 1986–1988

Member of European Parliament : 1989–1999

Regional councillor of Provence-Alpes-Côte d'Azur : 1992–2001

Municipal councillor of Marseille : 2002–2008

Political function

President of the National Republican Movement : 1998–2008
