= Fiammetta Venner =

French political scientist (born 1971)

- Born: 16 August 1971 (age 54); Beirut, Lebanon
- Occupations: Political scientist Writer
- Spouse: Caroline Fourest

Fiammetta Venner (born 16 August 1971) is a French political scientist, a writer and an editor. She is director of the Prochoix journal and Ikhwan Info. She wrote in Charlie Hebdo from 1995 to 2009, then again after the terrorist attack of January 2015. Since 2007, she directs a series of documentary called 100 muslim women speak for themselves

== Filmography ==
=== As director ===
- Parcs de la paix: le dernier rêve de Nelson Mandela (with Caroline Fourest)
- L'hiver turc (with Caroline Fourest)
- Marine Le Pen, l'histoire d'une héritière (with Caroline Fourest)
- Des petits soldats contre l'avortement (with Caroline Fourest)
- La bataille des droits de l'Homme (with Caroline Fourest)
- Certifiées Vierges (with Caroline Fourest)
- Sœur Innocenta, priez pour nous ! (with Caroline Fourest)
- 100 muslim women speak for themselves
  - Yasmin Fatimah, Rohingya refugee (Birmanie)
  - Bariathoula Achimi, an engineer to be (Benin)
  - Alia Malik, honey tracker (Chine)
  - Mehennigar Rajshahi, arsenic victim (Bangladesh)
  - Muyasar el Sadi, palestinian refugee (Jordanie)
  - Rebiya Kadeer, Uyghurs Mother (China)
  - Norma, martyr's daughter (Liban)
  - Ati Rulianti marionettiste à Bandoeng (Indonésie)
  - Om Youssef, a lady who likes TV (Egypt)

=== As producer ===
- Safia & Sarah
- Sœur Innocenta, priez pour nous !
- 100 muslim women speak for themselves

== Books ==
- L'Opposition à l'avortement, du lobby au commando, Berg, 1995. (ISBN 2-911289-02-1)
- L'Extrême droite et les femmes (with Claudie Lesselier), Golias, 1997. (ISBN 2-911453-22-0)
- Le guide des sponsors du Front national et de ses amis (with Caroline Fourest), R. Castells, 1998. (ISBN 2-912587-00-X)
- Les anti-pacs, ou La dernière croisade homophobe (with Caroline Fourest), éditions Prochoix, 1999. (ISBN 2-913749-00-3)
- Tirs croisés. La laïcité à l'épreuve des intégrismes juif, chrétien et musulman (with Caroline Fourest), éditions Calmann-Lévy, 2003. (ISBN 2-7021-3304-5)
- L'Effroyable Imposteur, à propos de Thierry Meyssan, Grasset, 2005. (ISBN 2246656710)
- OPA sur l’islam de France : les ambitions de l’UOIF, Calmann-Lévy, 2005. (ISBN 2-7021-3524-2)
- Charlie Blasphème (with Charb and Caroline Fourest), éditions Charlie Hebdo, 2006.
- Extrême France: Les mouvements frontistes, nationaux-radicaux, royalistes, catholiques traditionalistes et provie, Grasset, novembre 2006. (Sur la base de la thèse soutenue à l'IEP sous la direction de Pascal Perrineau (ISBN 978-2-246-66601-1)
- Collaboration à Erwan Lecœur (director), Dictionnaire de l'extrême droite, Paris, Larousse, " À présent ", 2007. (ISBN 978-2-03-582622-0)
- Les Nouveaux Soldats du pape – Légion du Christ, Opus Dei, traditionalistes (with Caroline Fourest), Panama, 2008. (ISBN 978-2-7557-0259-0)
- Les interdits religieux (with Caroline Fourest), Dalloz, 2010. (ISBN 978-2-247-08415-9)
- Marine Le Pen (with Caroline Fourest), Grasset, 2011 (ISBN 978-2-246-78382-4).
- L'islamophobie. Jérôme Blanchet-Gravel (director) et Éric Debroise (codirector.), éditions Dialogue Nord-Sud, 2016.
