= Achille Dauphin-Meunier =

French economist

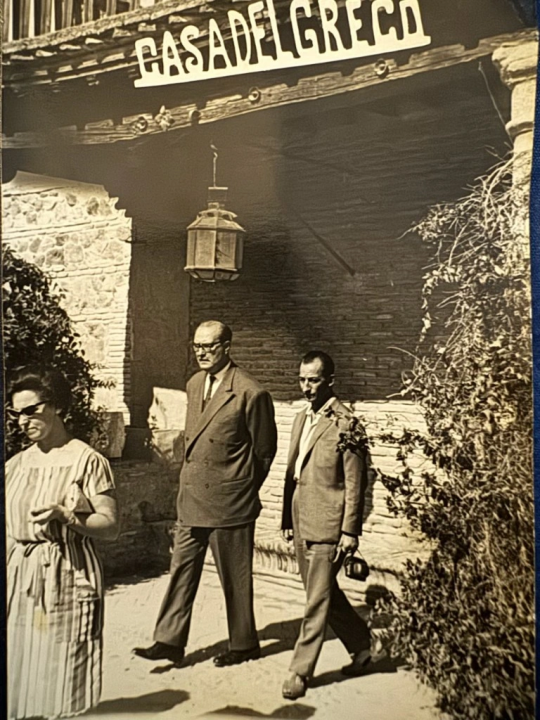
- Dauphin-Meunier (centre) in Toledo, 1962
- Born: Marie Achille Dauphin-Meunier; 28 July 1906; Bourg-la-Reine, French Third Republic
- Died: 18 August 1984 (aged 78); Cailly-sur-Eure, French Fifth Republic
- Other name: Pierre Ganivet
- Education: Lycée Lakanal; Sciences Po
- Occupations: Legal scholar and economist
- Employers: Paribas; University of Paris; University of Toulouse; Aujourd'hui; Catholic University of Paris
- Organizations: CGT; Régime de Vichy; Carrefour de l'Horloge
- Known for: Collaborationism
- Political party: Union des nationaux indépendants et républicains
- Other political affiliations: PSdF
- Movement: Anarcho-syndicalism; Humanism; Corporatism; Fascism
- Board member of: European Documentation and Information Centre; Faculté libre de droit, d'économie et de gestion de Paris
- Parents: Joseph Dauphin Meunier (father); Claire Bouchard (mother)

Marie Achille Dauphin-Meunier (28 July 1906 – 18 August 1984) was a French legal scholar, economist, syndicalist, and anarchist. He was a member of the Club de l'horloge.
