= Jean-Yves Le Gallou =

French politician, essayist and official (born 1948)

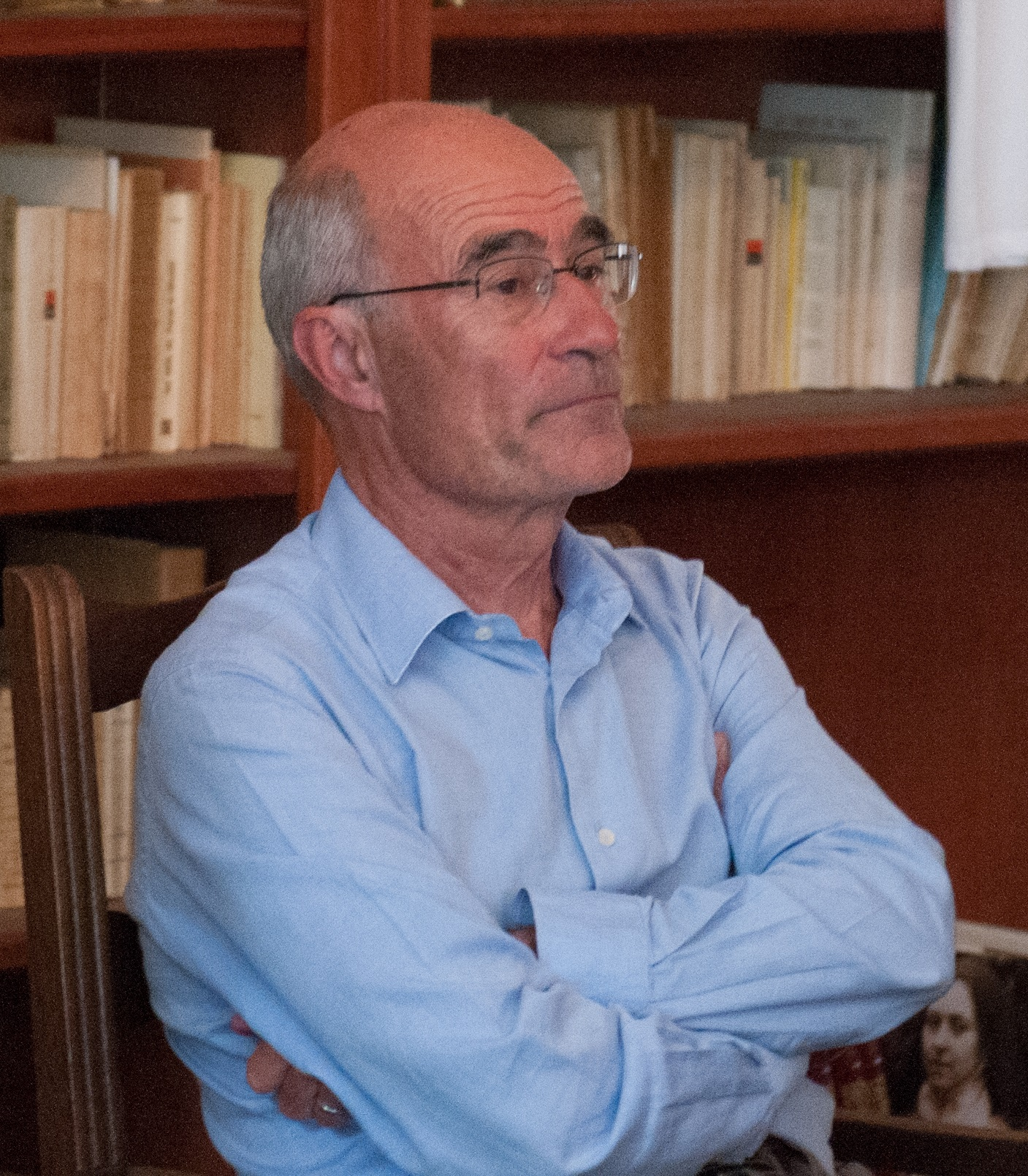
- Le Gallou in 2016

Member of the European Parliament
- In office 19 July 1994 – 19 July 1999

Member of the Regional Council of Île-de-France
- In office 16 March 1986 – 28 March 2004
- President: Michel Giraud; Jean-Paul Huchon

Personal details
- Born: 4 October 1948 (age 78) Paris, France
- Party: Reconquête (2022–present)
- Other political affiliations: National Front (1985–1999); National Republican Movement (1999–2022)
- Education: Sciences Po; École nationale d'administration

Jean-Yves Le Gallou (French pronunciation: [ʒɑ̃iv lə ɡalu]; born 4 October 1948) is a French writer and former politician. He served as a member of the European Parliament (MEP) from 1994 until 1999, representing the National Front. Since 2022, he has been a member of Reconquête.

== Career ==
Le Gallou began his political career as a member of the Republican Party. In 1974 he joined Yvan Blot in setting up the Club de l'Horloge. As the club developed links with GRECE Le Gallou grew in importance, serving as a bridge between the Nouvelle Droite and mainstream right-wing politics.

Le Gallou grew close to the National Front and helped to develop their préférence nationale policy of the 1980s, which called for welfare, health, education and job provisions to be given to French citizens of autochthonous origins first. He soon joined the party and rose in influence, joining Blot and Bruno Mégret, in developing the party's neo-liberal economic policy. He was one of the 11 FN members elected to the European Parliament in the 1994 election. Meanwhile, Le Gallou became a close associate of Bruno Mégret and followed him into the National Republican Movement.

In June 2014, Le Gallou, Bernard Lugan and Philippe Conrad co-founded the racialist think tank fr:Institut Iliade, which describes itself "in the continuity of Dominique Venner's thought and action". The organization held a colloquium with Renaud Camus, Charlotte d'Ornellas and Jean Raspail in April 2016.

In 2022, he joined Reconquête.

== Private life ==
In his spare time, Le Gallou is a keen mountaineer and has completed a number of traditional races in the Alps. He participates in pagan ceremonies, notably at the summer solstice.

== Works ==
- Dir. (1977). Les Racines du futur: demain la France (PDF). Éditions Masson. ISBN 978-2-225-47938-0. BnF 345874189.
- Dir. (1985). La Préférence nationale: réponse à l'immigration. Éditions Albin Michel. ISBN 978-2-226-02233-2. OCLC 417224939. BnF 36607385.
- With Jean-François Jalkh (1987). Être Français cela se mérite. Albatros. BnF 366263467.
- Le Livre bleu blanc rouge: plaidoyer pour une région enracinée (in French). Paris: Éditions nationales. 1991. ISBN 2-909178-00-5. BnF 35679827.
- With Philippe Olivier (1992). Immigration: le Front national fait le point (in French). Paris: Éditions nationales. ISBN 2-909178-05-6. BnF 36671047.
- L'Inéluctable Échec de Balladur. Paris: Éditions nationales. 1993.
- Rapport d'enquête sur le budget européen. Les Presses bretonnes. 1996. ISBN 978-2-85615-025-2. BnF 358551499.
- Le Défi gaulois: carnets de route en France réelle. Libraire nationale. 2000. ISBN 978-2-911202-35-3. BnF 372202010.
- Dictionnaire de réinformation: cinq cents mots pour la dissidence. Rueil-Malmaison: Polémia. 2010.
- La Tyrannie médiatique: les assassins de l'information (in French). Versailles: Via Romana. 2013. ISBN 979-10-90029-40-8. BnF 43580242w.
- Dir. (2014). La Désinformation publicitaire. Versailles: Via Romana. ISBN 978-1-0900-2990-4.
- With Michel Geoffroy (2015). Dictionnaire de novlangue: ces 1000 mots qui vous manipulent (in French). Versailles: Via Romana. ISBN 978-2-37271-018-3.
- Immigration: la catastrophe : que faire ? (in French). Versailles: Via Romana. 2016. ISBN 978-2-37271-042-8.
- Européen d'abord: essai sur la préférence de civilisation (in French). Versailles: Via Romana. 2018. ISBN 978-2-37271-103-6.
- Dir., L'Album des Bobards : 10 ans de fake news des médias, Versailles, Via Romana, 2019 ISBN 978-2-3727-1125-8.
- Manuel de lutte contre la diabolisation, Paris, La Nouvelle Librairie, 2020 ISBN 978-2-491446-18-5.
- L'Invasion de l'Europe : les chiffres du Grand Remplacement, Versailles, Via Romana, 2020 ISBN 978-2-37271-170-8.
- La Société de propagande, Paris, La Nouvelle Librairie, 2022 ISBN 978-2-493898-44-9.
- Mémoires identitaires : 1968-2025 : Les dessous du Grand Basculement, Versailles, Via Romana, 292 p., 2025 ISBN 978-2372712774.
- Remigration : Pour l'Europe de nos enfants, foreward by Martin Sellner, Paris, co-édition Institut Iliade / La Nouvelle Librairie, 142 p., 2026 ISBN 978-2386080586

=== English traductions ===
- The Propaganda Society: Resistance Manual for the Mental Gulag, Budapest, Arktos, 2025.
- Remigration : For the Europe for our Children, foreword by Martin Sellner, Budapest, Arktos, 2026.
