= Far-right politics in France =

The far-right (French: Extrême droite) tradition in France finds its origins in the Third Republic with Boulangism and the Dreyfus affair. In the 1880s, General Georges Boulanger, called "General Revenge" (Général Revanche), championed demands for military revenge against Imperial Germany as retribution for the defeat and fall of the Second French Empire during the Franco-Prussian War (1870–1871). This stance, known as revanchism, began to exert a strong influence on French nationalism. Soon thereafter, the Dreyfus affair provided one of the political division lines of France. French nationalism, which had been largely associated with left-wing and Republican ideologies before the Dreyfus affair, turned after that into a main trait of the right-wing and, moreover, of the far right. A new right emerged, and nationalism was reappropriated by the far-right who turned it into a form of ethnic nationalism, blended with antisemitism, xenophobia, anti-Protestantism and anti-Masonry. The Action française (AF), first founded as a journal and later a political organization, was the matrix of a new type of counter-revolutionary right-wing, which continues to exist today. During the interwar period, the Action française and its youth militia, the Camelots du Roi, were very active. Far-right leagues organized riots.

After World War II, the Organisation armée secrète (OAS) was created in Madrid in 1961 by French military personnel opposed to the independence of Algeria. Jean-Marie Le Pen founded the Front National (FN) party in 1972. At the 1986 legislative elections, the FN managed to obtain 35 seats, with 10% of the votes. Mark Frederiksen, a French Algeria activist, created in April 1966 a neo-Nazi group, the FANE (Fédération d'action nationaliste et européenne, Nationalist and European Federation of Action). However, in 1978, neo-Nazi members of the GNR-FANE broke again with the FN. During the 1980s, the National Front managed to gather, under Jean-Marie Le Pen's leadership, most rival far-right tendencies of France, following a succession of splits and alliances with other, minor parties, during the 1970s.

== Third Republic (1871–1914) ==
The French Third Republic (1871–1940) was established after France's defeat in the 1870 Franco-Prussian War and the subsequent Paris Commune of 1871. From 1894 to 1906, French society became deeply divided by the Dreyfus affair, a major political scandal that proved to be a turning point in the history of France. The modern "far right", or radical right, formed as a distinct political current during the Dreyfus affair. However, it had some antecedents in earlier years of the Third Republic.

Many French nationalists came to oppose the Third Republic soon after its founding, believing that it had adopted an "English" constitution by creating a strong parliament and a weak presidency; in place of this, nationalists favored a political system led by a strong ruler, originally a presidential republic, although some eventually came to support the idea of a restored monarchy. Across French society, there was also a common feeling of pride in the army and resentment about its defeat by the Germans. This defeat was blamed on the politicians who later became leaders of the Third Republic, and there were increasing antisemitic tendencies that accused Jewish politicians and officers of disloyalty to the nation. For the nationalists, the army was "the people armed", the truest representative of the nation, and any criticism of the army was seen as an attack on France itself. Thus, they rallied to "defend the army" when they felt it was under threat from internal enemies, such as first during the Boulanger affair and later during the Dreyfus affair. The political coalitions originally built to support the army during these affairs, provided the foundations for the 20th century radical right.

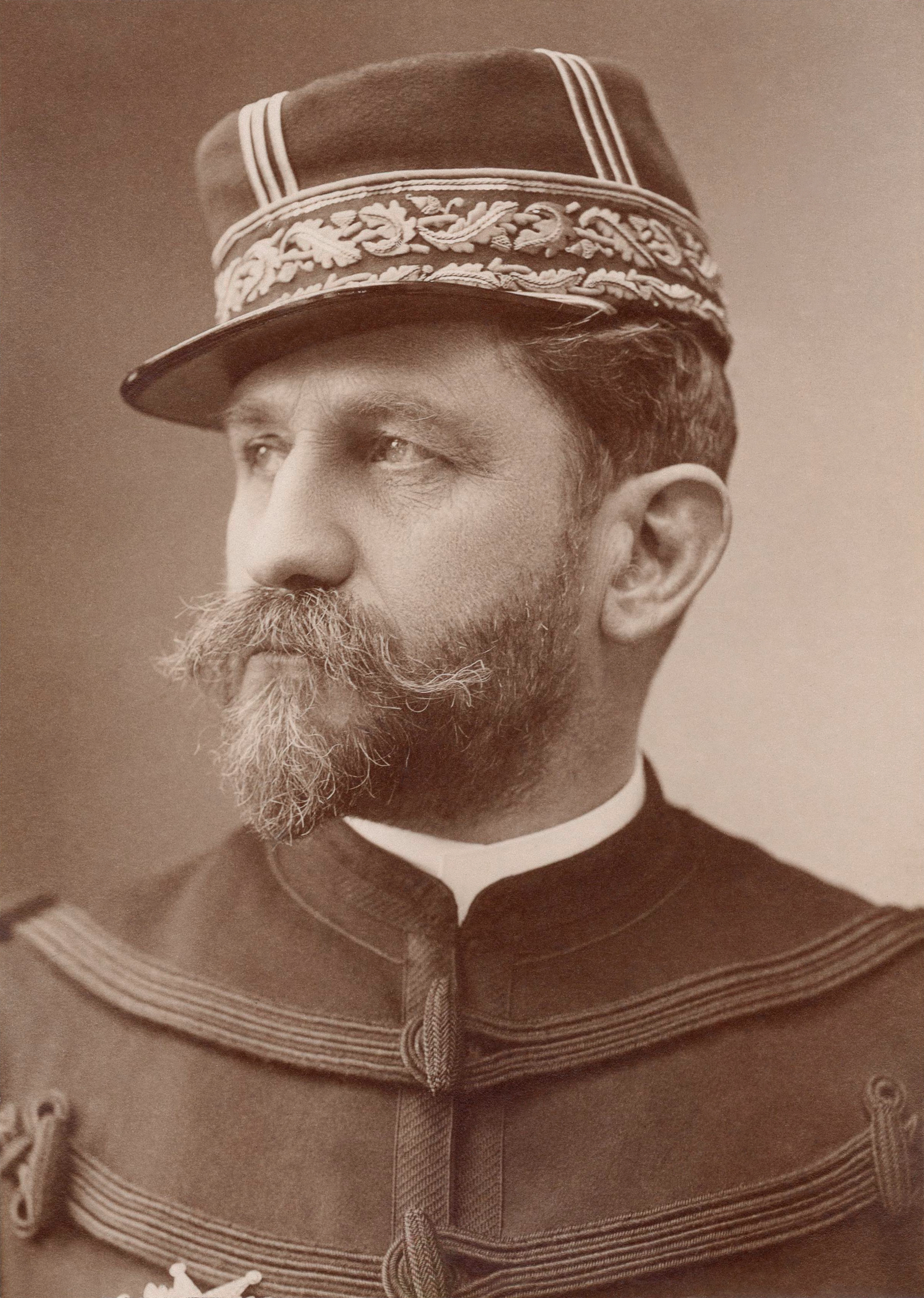
Georges Ernest Boulanger (1837–1891)

The "Boulanger Affair", which culminated in 1889, championed the vague demands of the former Minister of War, General Georges Boulanger. Boulanger had earlier attracted popular support by ordering lenient treatment of strikers when the army was called upon to suppress strikes. He also rattled his saber against Germany, which pleased French patriots intent on taking revenge. But this alarmed the other ministers, who dropped Boulanger from the government. When his champions mounted an electoral campaign to have him elected to the Chamber of Deputies, the government reacted by forcing him out of the army. Violent agitation in Paris on the election night in 1889 convinced the government to prosecute Boulanger in order to remove him from the political scene. Instead of facing trumped up charges, Boulanger fled to Belgium. His supporters, called "Boulangists", afterward nursed an intense grievance against the Republic and reunited during the Dreyfus affair to oppose the Republic and "back the army" once again.

=== Dreyfus affair and foundation of the Action française ===
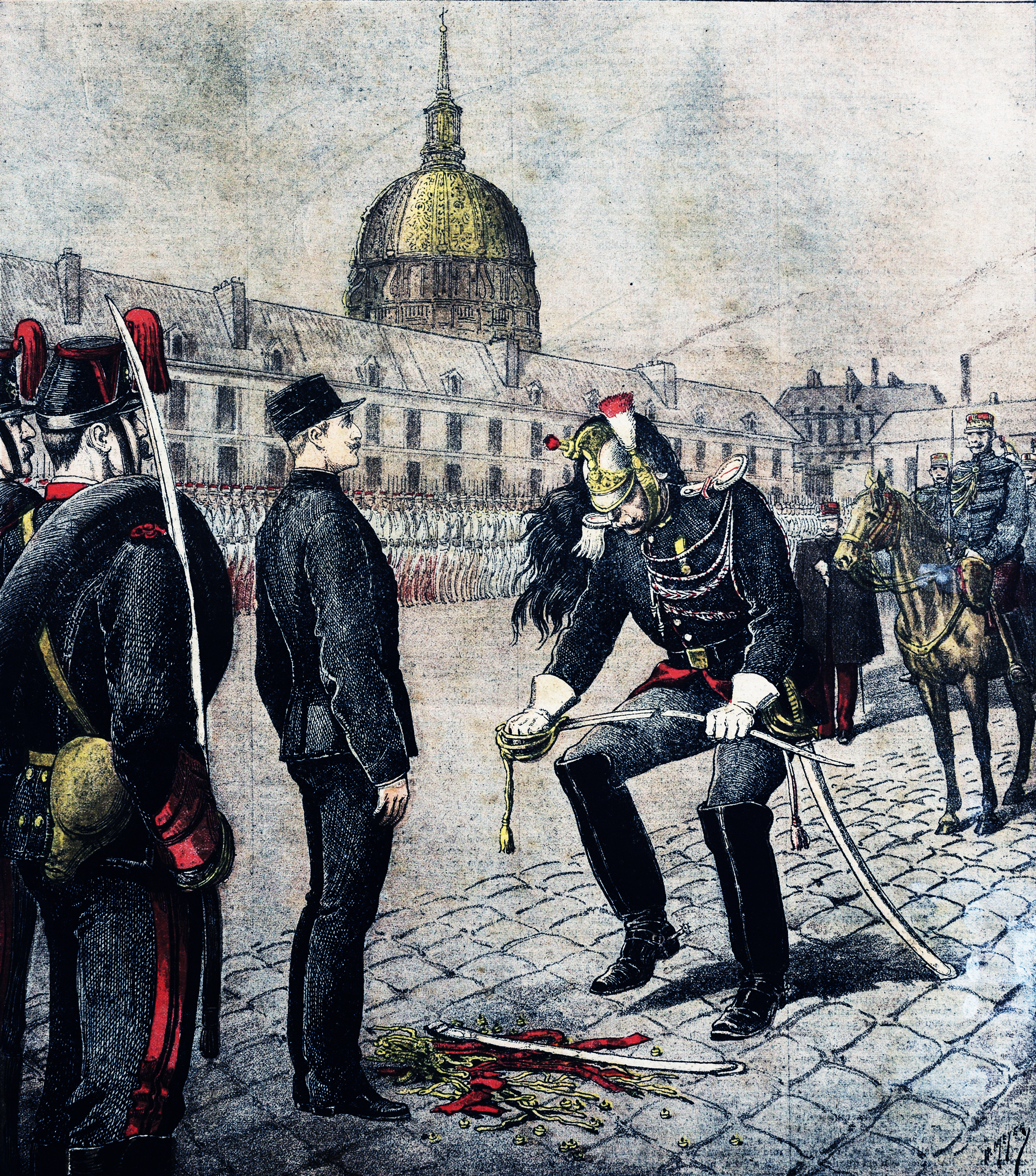
Degradation of Alfred Dreyfus, 1895

In 1894, a Jewish officer, Alfred Dreyfus, was arrested on accusations of treason and sharing intelligence with the German Empire. The Dreyfus affair provided one of the political fault lines of France. Before the Dreyfus affair, Nationalism had been a left-wing and Republican ideology; after, it became a main trait of the right-wing and, moreover, of the far-right.

Émile Zola entered the political scene with his open letter "J'Accuse…!", followed by other writers, artists and scholars supporting him with a "Manifesto of the Intellectuals", helping to define the meaning of the term "intellectual", while the left and right were at loggerheads, mainly over the questions of militarism, nationalism, justice and human rights. Until then, nationalism was a Republican, left-wing ideology, related to the French Revolution and the Revolutionary Wars. It was a liberal nationalism, formulated by Ernest Renan's definition of the nation as a "daily plebiscite" and as formed by the subjective "will to live together". Related to "revanchism", the belligerent will to take revenge against Germany and retake control of Alsace-Lorraine, nationalism could then be sometimes opposed to imperialism. In the 1880s, a debate thus opposed those who opposed the "colonial lobby", such as radical Georges Clemenceau, who declared that colonialism diverted France from the "blue line of the Vosges" (referring to Alsace-Lorraine), socialist Jean Jaurès and nationalist Maurice Barrès, against Moderate Republican Jules Ferry, republican Léon Gambetta and Eugène Etienne, the president of the parliamentary colonial group.

However, in the midst of the Dreyfus affair, a new right emerged, and nationalism was appropriated by the far right who turned it into a form of ethnic nationalism, itself blended with antisemitism, xenophobia, anti-Protestantism and anti-Masonry. Charles Maurras (1868–1952), founder of "integralism" (or "integral nationalism"), created the term "Anti-France" to stigmatize "internal foreigners", or the "four confederate states of Protestants, Jews, Freemasons and foreigners" (his actual word for the latter being the far less polite métèques). A few years later, Maurras would join the monarchist Action française, created by Maurice Pujo and Henri Vaugeois in 1898. Maurras, who was an agnostic, spearheaded a monarchist and Catholic revival. He pragmatically conceived of religion as an ideology useful to unify the nation. Most French Catholics were conservatives, a trait that continues today. On the other hand, most Protestants, Jews and atheists belonged to the left. Henceforth, the republicans' conception was, to the contrary, that only state secularism could peacefully bind together diverse religious and philosophical tendencies, and avoid any return to the Wars of Religion. Furthermore, Catholic priests were seen as a major reactionary force by the republicans, among whom anti-clericalism became common. The Ferry laws on public education had been a first step for the Republic in rooting out the clerics' influence: they would be completed by the 1905 law on the separation of Church and State.

Action française, first founded as a review, was the matrix of a new type of counter-revolutionary right-wing, and continues to exist today. Action française was quite influential in the 1930s, in particular through its youth organization, the Camelots du Roi, founded in 1908, and which engaged in many street brawls. The Camelots du Roi included such figures as Catholic writer Georges Bernanos and Jean de Barrau, member of the directing committee of the National Federation, and particular secretary of the duc d'Orléans (1869–1926), the son of the Orléanist count of Paris (1838–1894) and hence Orléanist heir to the throne of France. Many members of the OAS terrorist group during the Algerian War (1954–1962) were part of the monarchist movement. Jean Ousset, Maurras' personal secretary, created the Catholic fundamentalist organization Cité catholique, which would include OAS members and founded a branch in Argentina in the 1960s.

Apart from the Action française, several far-right leagues were created during the Dreyfus affair. Mostly antisemitic, they also represented a new right-wing tendency, sharing common traits such as anti-parliamentarism, militarism, nationalism, and often engaged in street brawls. Thus, the nationalist poet Paul Déroulède created in 1882 the antisemitic Ligue des patriotes (League of Patriots), which at first focused on advocating 'revanche' (revenge) for the French defeat during the Franco-Prussian War. Along with Jules Guérin, the journalist Edouard Drumont created the Antisemitic League of France in 1889. Also anti-Masonic, the League became at the start of the 20th century the Grand Occident de France, a name chosen in reaction against the Masonic lodge of the Grand Orient de France.

== Between the wars ==
During the interwar period, the Action française (AF) and its youth militia, the Camelots du Roi, were very active in Paris. Apart from the AF, various far-right leagues were formed and opposed both Cartel des gauches (Coalition of the left) governments. Pierre Taittinger thus formed the Jeunesses Patriotes in 1924, which imitated the style of the Fascists, although it remained a more traditional authoritarian movement. The following year, Georges Valois created Le Faisceau, heavily inspired by Benito Mussolini's Fascism. In 1933, the year Adolf Hitler gained power in Germany, perfumer François Coty founded Solidarité française and Marcel Bucard formed the Francisme, which was subsidised by Mussolini. Another important league was François de la Rocque's Croix de Feu, which formed the base for the Parti Social Français (PSF), the first mass party of the French right-wing. Mussolini was much more popular in right-wing circles than Hitler due to the negative reaction many French conservatives had to Hitler's repression of dissident German conservatives and Catholics in 1933 and 1934.

Apart from the leagues, a group of Neosocialists (Marcel Déat, Pierre Renaudel, etc.) were excluded in November 1933 from the French Section of the Workers' International (SFIO, the socialist party) because of their revisionist stances and admiration for fascism. Déat would become one of the most ardent collaborationists during World War II.

Another major player in France's right-wing world between the wars was Jacques Doriot. Doriot had been expelled by the French Communist Party after proposing a Popular Front with other leftist parties, which at that time was seen as heresy by his party's hierarchy. Personally hurt and embittered by his expulsion, Doriot would slowly change sides, eventually openly denouncing communism and going on to found the Parti Populaire Francais or PPF, the largest pre-war right wing party. Other important figures of the 1930s include Xavier Vallat, who would become General Commissioner for Jewish Affairs under Vichy, members of the Cagoule terrorist group (Eugène Deloncle, Eugène Schueller (the founder of L'Oréal cosmetic firm), Jacques Corrèze, Joseph Darnand, who later founded the Service d'ordre légionnaire militia during Vichy, etc.). To obtain arms from fascist Italy, the group assassinated two Italian antifascists, the Rosselli brothers, on June 9, 1937, and sabotaged aeroplanes clandestinely supplied by the French government to the Second Spanish Republic. They also attempted a coup against the Popular Front government, elected in 1936, leading to arrests in 1937, ordered by Interior Minister Marx Dormoy, during which the police seized explosives and military weapons, including anti-tank guns.

Far right leagues organised major riots on 6 February 1934. The groups did not coordinate their efforts and the riots were suppressed by the police and military. Elements on the left were convinced that unity was essential to suppress fascism, and in 1936 they formed the Popular Front and dissolved the leagues. However the right-wing leagues promptly reorganized as political parties and continued vocal attacks on the left.

== Fifth Republic ==
The Organisation armée secrète (OAS) was created in Madrid by French military officers opposed to the independence of Algeria. Many of its members would later join various anti-communist struggles around the world. Some, for example, joined the Cité catholique fundamentalist group and went to Argentina, where they were in contact with the Argentine Armed Forces. Jean Pierre Cherid, former OAS member, took part in the 1976 Montejurra massacre against left-wing Carlists. He was then part of the Spanish GAL death squad, and participated in the 1978 assassination of Argala, one of the ETA members who had killed Franco's Prime minister, Luis Carrero Blanco, in 1973.

Jean-Louis Tixier-Vignancour was the far-right candidate at the 1965 presidential election. His campaign was organised by Jean-Marie Le Pen. Charles de Gaulle said of Tixier-Vignancourt: "Tixier-Vignancour, that is Vichy, the Collaboration proud of itself, the Milice, the OAS".

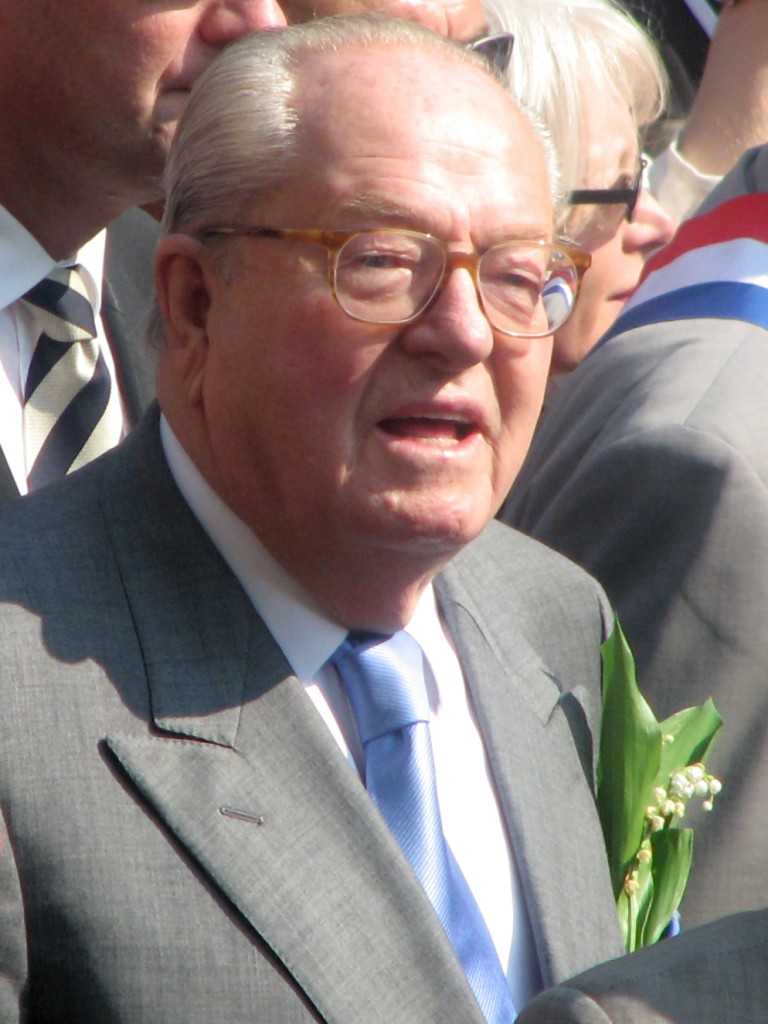
Jean-Marie Le Pen founded the Front National in 1972 and led it until 2011

Jean-Marie Le Pen founded the Front National (FN) party in 1972, along with former Occident member Jacques Bompard, former Collaborationist Roland Gaucher, François Duprat, who introduced the negationist thesis to France, and others nostalgics of Vichy France, Catholic fundamentalists, etc. Le Pen presented himself for the first time in the 1974 presidential election, obtaining 0.74%. The electoral rise of the FN did not start until Jean-Pierre Stirbois's victory, in 1983, in Dreux. The FN became stronger throughout the 1980s, managing to unite most far-right tendencies, passing electoral alliances with the right-wing Rally for the Republic (RPR), while some FN members quit the party to join the RPR or the Union for a French Democracy (UDF). At the 1986 legislative elections, the FN managed to obtain 35 seats, with 10% of the votes.

Meanwhile, other far-right tendencies gathered in Alain de Benoist's Nouvelle Droite think-tank, heading a pro-European and neopagan line. Some radical members of the "national revolutionary" tendency quit the FN to form other minor parties (Party of New Forces, PFN, and French and European Nationalist Party, PNFE).

=== French Third Position's relations with the National Front ===
Mark Frederiksen, a French Algeria activist, created in April 1966 a neo-Nazi group, the FANE (Fédération d'action nationaliste et européenne, Nationalist and European Federation of Action). The FANE boasted at most a hundred activists, including members such as Luc Michel, now leader of the Parti communautaire national-européen (National European Communautary Party), Jacques Bastide, Michel Faci, Michel Caignet and Henri-Robert Petit, a journalist and former Collaborationist who directed under the Vichy regime the newspaper Le Pilori. The FANE maintained international contacts with the British group the League of Saint George.

The FANE rallied Jean-Marie Le Pen's National Front in 1974, gathered around François Duprat and Alain Renault's Revolutionary Nationalist Groups (GNR), which represented the nationalist revolutionary tendency of the FN.

But in 1978, neo-Nazi members of the GNR-FANE broke again with the FN, taking with them sections of the FN youth movement, the Front National de la Jeunesse. On the other hand, GNR activists closer to the Third Position (Jacques Bastide and Patrick Gorre) joined Jean-Gilles Malliarakis to found, on February 11, 1979, the Revolutionary Nationalist Movement (Mouvement nationaliste révolutionnaire), which became in 1985 Third Way (Troisième Voie).

After this brief passage at the National Front, Mark Fredriksen created the Faisceaux nationalistes européens (FANE) in July 1980. These would eventually merge with the Mouvement national et social ethniste in 1987, and then with the PNFE (French and European Nationalist Party) in January 1994, which also gathered former National Front members.

Dissolved first in September 1980 by Raymond Barre's government, Fredriksen's group was recreated, and dissolved again in 1985 by Laurent Fabius' government. Finally, it was dissolved a third time in 1987 by Jacques Chirac's government, on charges of "violent demonstrations organised by this movement, which has as one of its expressed objective the establishment of a new Nazi regime", the "paramilitary organisation of this association and its inciting of racial discrimination".

=== Alain de Benoist's Nouvelle Droite and the Club de l'Horloge ===
In the 1980s, Alain de Benoist became chief theorist of the Nouvelle Droite movement, creating the think-tank GRECE in 1968, some of whose members were involved with the formation of the Club de l'Horloge in 1974. They advocated an ethno-nationalist stance focused on European culture, which advocated a return of paganism. Members of the GRECE quit the think tank in the 1980s, such as Pierre Vial who joined the FN, or Guillaume Faye who quit the organisation along with others members in 1986. Faye participated in 2006 in a conference in the US organised by American Renaissance, a white separatist magazine published by the New Century Foundation.

Alain de Benoist occasionally contributed to the Mankind Quarterly review, which supports hereditarianism and is associated with the US think tank the Pioneer Fund, headed by J. Philippe Rushton, the author of Race, Evolution and Behavior (1995), which argues in favour of a biological conception of "race". GRECE and the Pioneer Fund are actively involved in the race and intelligence debate, postulating that there is an identifiable link between levels of intelligence and distinct ethnic groups.

The Club de l'horloge itself had been founded by Henry de Lesquen, a former member of the conservative Rally for the Republic, which he quit in 1984. Others members of the Club de l'horloge, such as Bruno Mégret, later joined the FN after a short time in the RPR.

=== Rise of the National Front in the 1980s and Mégret's split ===
During the 1980s, the National Front managed to gather, under Jean-Marie Le Pen's leadership, most rival far-right tendencies of France, following a succession of splits and alliances with other, minor parties, during the 1970s.

==== Party of New Forces ====
One of those parties, the Party of New Forces (PFN, Parti des forces nouvelles), was an offshoot of the National Front, formed from a 1973 split headed by Alain Robert and François Brigneau who first organised the Comité faire front which subsequently merged into the PFN.

The PFN was formed mainly by former members of New Order (Ordre nouveau, 1969–1973), who had refused to merge into the FN at its 1972 creation. New Order, dissolved by Interior Minister Raymond Marcellin in 1973, was itself a successor to Occident (1964–1968) and of the Union Defense Group (GUD, Groupe union défense).

Close to the Third Position and supporting a "national-revolutionary" thesis, this tendency maintained links with the FN, despite some tensions. The GUD, in particular, had published the satiric monthly Alternative with the Youth Front (Front de la jeunesse), the youth organisation of the FN. They also had attempted alliances with other far-right parties in Europe, with New Order organising the alliance "A Fatherland for Tomorrow" (Une patrie pour demain) with the Spanish Falange, the Italian Social Movement (MSI) and the German National Democratic Party.

This European strategy was continued by the PFN, who launched the Euroright alliance, with the MSI, the Spanish New Force and the Belgian PFN, for the 1979 European elections. Headed by Jean-Louis Tixier-Vignancour, the PFN won 1.3% of the vote. This electoral failure prompted Roland Gaucher and François Brigneau to quit the party and join Le Pen's National Front.

==== 1981 presidential election ====
The French far-right was divided in the 1981 presidential election, with both Pascal Gauchon (PFN) and Le Pen (FN) attempting, without success, to secure the 500 signatures from mayors necessary to stand as candidates. François Mitterrand (Socialist Party) won those elections, competing against Jacques Chirac (Rally for the Republic, RPR).

==== 1983 elections and rise ====
These succeeding electoral defeats prompted the far-right to unify itself. In 1983, the FN managed to make its first electoral breakthrough, taking control of the town of Dreux: Jean-Pierre Stirbois obtained 17% of the votes in the first round, for the FN municipal list. In the second round, he merged his list with Chirac's RPR list (headed by Jean Hieaux), enabling the right to claim a victory against the left. Chirac supported the alliance with the far-right, claiming that the Socialist Party, allied with the Communist Party in government, had no lessons to give.

This first electoral success was confirmed at the 1984 European elections, the FN obtaining 10% of the votes. Two years later, the FN gained 35 deputies (nearly 10% of the votes) at the 1986 legislative elections, running under the label of "Rassemblement national". Those elected included the monarchist Georges-Paul Wagner.

Internal disputes continued however to divide the far-right. Following the 1986 elections, which brought Jacques Chirac to power as Prime Minister, some hardliners inside the FN broke away to create the French and European Nationalist Party (PNFE, Parti Nationaliste Français et Européen), along with members of Mark Frederiksen's Third Position FANE. Three former members of the PNFE were charged of having desecrated, in 1990, a Jewish cemetery in Carpentras. The PNFE was also implicated in the 1988 Cannes and Nice attacks.

==== Mégret's split, 2002 election results and subsequent electoral fall ====
The most important split was headed by Bruno Mégret in 1999. Taking many FN elected representatives and party officials with him, he then created the National Republican Movement (MNR). However, with an eye to the 2007 legislative elections, he supported Le Pen's candidacy for the presidential election.

During these presidential elections, Jean-Marie Le Pen only took 10.4% of the vote, compared to his 16.9% first round result in 2002, qualifying him for the second round, where he achieved 17.79% against 82.21% for Jacques Chirac (Rally for the Republic, RPR).

With only 1.85% in the second round of the 2002 legislative elections, the FN failed to gain any seats in the National Assembly. In the 2007 presidential election, Le Pen finished fourth, behind Nicolas Sarkozy, Ségolène Royal and François Bayrou. Philippe de Villiers, the Catholic traditionalist candidate of the Movement for France (especially strong in the conservative Vendée region), was sixth, obtaining 2.23% of the vote.

This electoral slump for the FN was confirmed at the 2007 legislative elections, the FN obtaining only 0.08% of the votes in the second round, and therefore no seats.

==== Le Pen's succession ====
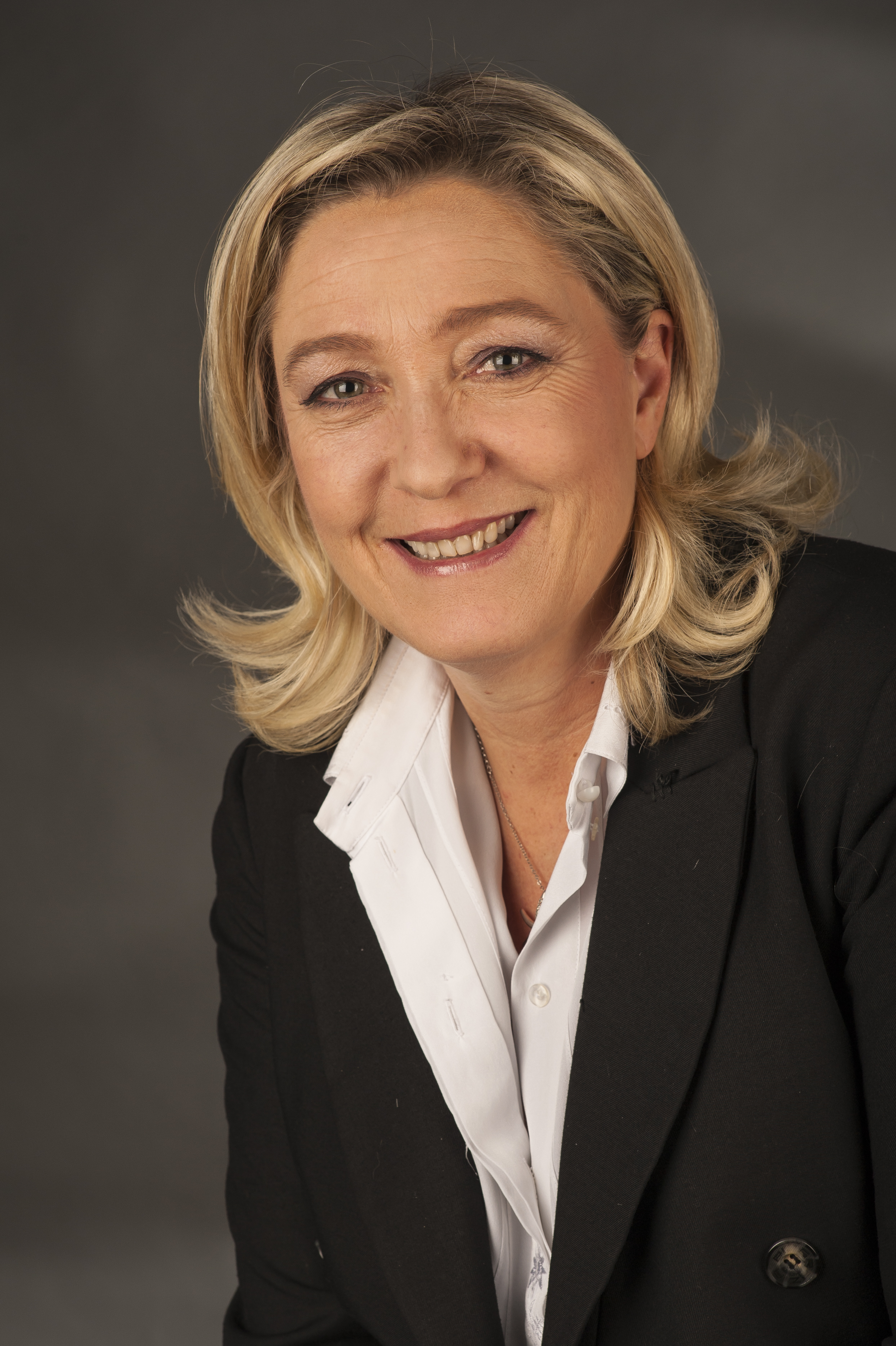
Marine Le Pen succeeded her father as Front National leader in 2011

These electoral defeats, which contrasted with the high score obtained at the 2002 presidential elections, caused financial problems for the FN, which was forced to sell its headquarters, the Paquebot, in Saint-Cloud. Le Pen then announced, in 2008, that he would not compete again in presidential elections, leaving the way for contest for the leadership of the FN between his daughter, Marine Le Pen, whom he favoured, and Bruno Gollnisch. The latter had been condemned in January 2007 for Holocaust denial, while Marine Le Pen attempted to follow a slicker strategy to give the FN a more "respectable" image.

=== FN 2010s surge ===
Since her election as the leader of the party in 2011, the popularity of the FN continued to grow apace as the party won several municipalities at the 2014 municipal elections; it topped the poll in France at the 2014 European elections with 25% of the vote; and again won more votes than any other party in the 2015 departmental elections. The party once again came in first place in the 2015 regional elections with a historic result of just under 28% of the vote. By 2015, the FN had established itself as one of the largest political forces in France, unusually being both most popular and most controversial political party.

For the 2012 presidential election, Le Pen came third in the first round, scoring 17.9% – the partys then best showing ever for the FN.

For the 2017 presidential election, Le Pen came second in the first round, scoring 21.3% – the best showing ever for the FN. in the second round she came second with 33.9% a best for NF.

In 2018, the National Front was renamed National Rally.

=== 2020s and onwards: between polarisation of the rights and dediabolisation strategies ===
Far right parties have never enjoyed such a big popularity as they have done since the results of the 2017 and 2022 elections. For the 2022 presidential election, Le Pen came second in the first round, scoring 23.15% – the best showing ever for the RN. Eric Zemmour got 7.07%. Total Far Right vote was 32%, the highest vote ever in a French election. Marine Le Pen may have lost in the second round, but nonetheless her defeat had a taste of victory: the score of 41.46% was the best showing ever for the RN or for a Far Right candidate.

The main reason of the success of the Rassemblement National lies with the political strategies of normalisation and dediabolisation led by Marine Le Pen and her fellow members of the party, to rally votes of right wing centrists, and to sweep away the extremism her father had cast upon the party.

However, the most radical fraction of the Rassemblement National accused Marine Le Pen of not being radical enough. In parallel, Éric Zemmour, a far-right pundit with no previous party affiliation or political experience, created his own party, Reconquête. His views, as a former journalist, in topics such as immigration are much more outspoken and radical than Le Pens. He even overtook Le Pen in one of the polls in the early days of the creation of his party.

Le Pen's niece, Marion Maréchal Le Pen, former member of RN became a member of Reconquête in 2021 while arguing herself and her aunt had "ideological differences". She was excluded of the party on the 18th June, accused of high treason by the head-of-party Eric Zemmour after she showed support for the Central- Far Right coalition between Eric Ciotti's Party The Republicans (France) and Rassemblement National.

In the June 2022 Assemblée Nationale election, the RN gained 89 seats in the national assembly, winning the party enough seats to form a parliamentary group for the first time since 1986.

=== European elections of 2024: the approach to power ===
The result of the European election was a long-awaited result for Le Pen. Arriving ahead of all other parties, Jordan Bardella's party "La France revient!" (lit. "France is coming back") cumulated 31,37% of votes. Turnout rate reached 51.49% and was 1.37 points higher than in 2019.

To this, President Emmanuel Macron dissolved the French Assembly and called for anticipated legislative elections on 30th and 3 July, acknowledging "that he wouldn't act as is nothing had happened." and arguing that far right parties are the impoverishment of French people.

=== 2024 Legislative Elections: alliance of the rights and countermovements ===
On the night of June 9, following the announcement of new elections, Marion Maréchal called for a "coalition of the rights" in the hopes of forming a union between the RN, LR, Reconquête! and DLF, mixing right-wing and far-right parties. In the following days, Marion Maréchal met with RN officials to discuss the modalities of a potential RN and Reconquête! coalition. However, on June 11, talks between the two parties failed as Jordan Bardella refused "any direct or indirect association with Éric Zemmour". Despite not reaching an agreement, Marion Maréchal exhorted her followers to vote for the RN-LR alliance the next day. Éric Zemmour denounced Marion Maréchal's declaration, calling her out for her "treason" and excluding her from Reconquête!.

On June 11, Éric Ciotti, the president of LR, announced during an interview on TF1 that he intended to form an alliance between his party and the RN, triggering The Republicans crisis. This announcement broke the historical cordon sanitaire between the French republican right and the far-right. However, many figures of LR criticized Éric Ciotti's decision to ally with the RN. In an interview in the evening on France 2, Jordan Bardella, president of the RN, confirmed the alliance between the RN and LR, declaring that a "deal" has been made between the two parties and that the RN will support multiple candidates of LR. On June 12, a political committee composed of influential members of LR declared the exclusion of Éric Ciotti from the party. Éric Ciotti contested this decision, claiming that he was still president of the party. This issue was brought to justice, where a judge temporarily invalidated the political committee's decision. However, a second political committee again excluded Éric Ciotti from LR on June 14.

In response to the threat of a potential RN government, France's 4 major leftist parties, the PS, LFI, Les Écologistes and the PCF, announced a union of the lefts, forming the New Popular Front. Moreover, around 640 000 people mobilized against the far-right in a nationwide protest on June 15; 75 000 or 250 000 of which, depending on sources, were in Paris.

== Individuals and groups ==
=== Individuals ===
- Raymond Abellio
- Marc Augier
- Jacques Bainville
- Maurice Barrès
- René Benjamin
- Jacques Benoist-Méchin
- Henri Béraud
- Abel Bonnard
- Paul Bourget
- Pierre Boutang
- Robert Brasillach
- Renaud Camus
- Louis-Ferdinand Céline
- Jacques Chardonne
- Alphonse de Châteaubriant
- Léon Daudet
- Pierre Drieu La Rochelle
- Édouard Drumont
- André Fraigneau
- Pierre Gaxotte
- Pierre Gripari
- Kléber Haedens
- Marcel Jouhandeau
- Jacques de Lacretelle
- Jean Mabire
- Henri Massis
- Thierry Maulnier
- Charles Maurras
- Jean-Pierre Maxence
- Henry de Monfreid
- Lucien Rebatet
- Hugues Rebell
- Paul Sérant
- Pierre Sidos
- Alain Soral
- Georges Vacher de Lapouge
- Dominique Venner
- Pierre Vial
- Éric Zemmour

=== Other minor groups ===
Other minor groups that are or have been active in the Fifth Republic include:

- Groupe Union Défense is French far-right student association
- Bastion Social is a nationalist youth movement
- Unité Radicale (one of its members, Maxime Brunerie, tried to assassinate President Jacques Chirac in 2002)
- Les Identitaires, formerly Bloc identitaire, an offshoot of Unité Radicale, dissolved after Brunerie's assassination attempt, which publicly distributes so-called "identity soups" ("soupes identitaires"), that is "popular soups" with pork in order to exclude religious Jews and Muslims from them.
- Parti Nationaliste Français et Européen (PNFE), a Pan-European nationalist group with which Brunerie was also associated.
- Parti des forces nouvelles, formed from an early anti-Le Pen faction of the Front National.
- Réseau Radical, a study group.
- Troisième Voie, a Third Position movement with links to the far right student movement Groupe Union Défense.

== See also ==
- Rock identitaire français
- Breton Social-National Workers' Movement
- Radical right

== Bibliography ==
- Davies, Peter. The National Front in France. Ideology, Discourse and Power (Routledge, 1999)
- Fuller, Robert Lynn. The Origins of the French Nationalist Movement, 1886–1914 (McFarland, 2012)
- Hainsworth, Paul. "The Extreme Right in France: From Pétain to Le Pen". Modern & Contemporary France (2012) 20#3 pp: 392–392. abstract
- Hutton, Patrick. "Popular Boulangism and the Advent of Mass Politics in France, 1886-90" Journal of Contemporary History (1976) 11#1 pp. 85–106 in JSTOR
- Irvine, William. The Boulanger Affair Reconsidered, Royalism, Boulangism, and the Origins of the Radical Right in France (Oxford University Press, 1989)
- Irvine, William D. French Conservatism in Crisis: The Republican Federation of France in the 1930s (1979).
- Kalman, Samuel, and Sean Kennedy, eds. The French Right Between the Wars: Political and Intellectual Movements From Conservatism to Fascism (Berghahn Books; 2014) 264 pages; scholars examine such topics as veterans and the extreme right, female right-wing militancy, and visions of masculinity in the natalist-familialist movement.
- Millington, Chris. A History of Fascism in France: From the First World War to the National Front (Bloomsbury, 2019) online review
- Passmore, Kevin. "The Historiography of 'Fascism' in France", French Historical Studies 37 (2014): 469–499
- Passmore, Kevin. The Right in France from the Third Republic to Vichy (Oxford University Press, 2013)
- Russo, Luana. "France: The historic victory of the Front National". in The European Parliament Elections of 2014 (2014): 181–188 online
- Shields, James. "Marine Le Pen and the 'New' FN: A Change of Style or of Substance?" Parliamentary affairs (2013) 66#1 pp: 179–196. abstract
- Weber, Eugen. L'Action Française, Royalism and Reaction in Twentieth-Century France (Stanford University Press, 1962)
- Winock, Michel. Nationalism, Anti-Semitism, and Fascism in France (Stanford University Press, 1998)

In French

- Bertrand Joly, Nationalistes et Conservateurs en France, 1885–1902 (Les Indes Savantes, 2008)
- Winock, Michel (dir.), Histoire de l'extrême droite en France (1993)
