= Pierre Bernard (Montfermeil politician) =

French politician

Chevalier Pierre Bernard (30 January 1934, Strasbourg) is a French politician, mayor of Montfermeil (various rights - divers droite) from March 1983 to June 2002 and counsellor in the canton de Montfermeil from 1992 to 1998. He replaced Eric Raoult, who had been nominated as minister, as a deputy of Seine-Saint-Denis from 1995 to 1997.

Pierre Bernard is the founder of the far-right NGO France Debout, over which he presided until 2004. He recently joined the Centre Charlier, headed by the former National Front MEP Bernard Antony and president of AGRIF.

In 1988, Pierre Bernard prohibited the registering of the children of immigrants to kindergarten and to school meals, leading twice to condemnation for racial discrimination in 1988 and 1991. He took as lawyer Jacques Trémollet de Villers, president of the La Cité Catholique fundamentalist group. He was again condemned for hate speech in 2002, by virtue of the Gayssot Act, and relaxed in September 2005 for another racial discrimination charge. He was also scolded by the CNIL on charges of racial profiling. Bernard assisted in 1996 at the funerals of the war criminal and Collaborationist Paul Touvier. He also regularly collaborates with Tribune nationaliste, the mouthpiece of the Neo-Nazi group Parti nationaliste français et européen (PNFE).

He was given the rank of knight of the Légion d'honneur in the beginning of 2006 on proposal of Nicolas Sarkozy.
