= Henri-Robert Petit =

French journalist and activist (1899–1985)

- Born: 1899
- Died: 1985 (aged 85–86)
- Other names: Henri Petit; Henry-Robert Petit; H.R. Petit
- Citizenship: France
- Occupations: Journalist and far-right activist
- Known for: Authoring of books expounding antisemitic and anti-Masonic conspiracy theories; and collaborationism under the Vichy regime

Henri Petit (alias: Henri-Robert or Henry-Robert) (1899–1985) was a French journalist, collaborationist under the Vichy regime, and far-right activist.

Henri Petit wrote several antisemitic and anti-Masonic books, and worked with far-right journalist Henry Coston, creator of an "Anti-Jewish Youth" organisation. Petit presented himself as an "anti-Jew" candidate for the 1936 legislative elections, which were won by the left-wing Popular Front. Petit then broke with Coston, who accused him of having stolen him money. In 1937, Petit became the secretary general of Louis Darquier de Pellepoix's Comité antijuif de France (Anti-Jewish Committee of France). In May 1942, Darquier de Pellepoix replaced Xavier Vallat as Vichy France's Commissioner for Jewish Affairs.

Petit carried on a literary correspondence with the influential novelist Louis-Ferdinand Céline. Petit's work influenced Céline, who shifted more and more to the far right during his career.

In 1939, Petit traveled to Nazi Germany to work in the "World Center of Anti-Semitic Propaganda". He returned to France after the proclamation by Marshal Philippe Pétain of the Vichy regime in 1940, and became the chief editor of the collaborationist newspaper Le Pilori before being replaced for having criticized the Pierre Laval too harshly. Petit worked directly with the Nazi propaganda services and was, because of that, not really appreciated in collaborationist circles, being seen as becoming more German than French. In August 1944, he left for Germany where his two sons worked as volunteers in the German Army.

On 18 November 1947, during the Épuration légale ("legal purge"), Petit was condemned in absentia to 20 years of prison and to "national degradation" (dégradation nationale). For some time, he lived clandestinely in Belleville, Paris, and in Meudon. After receiving amnesty in 1959, he published an astrology magazine, before collaborating with the Fédération d'action nationale et européenne (FANE), a neo-Nazi group created in 1966 by Mark Fredriksen. Petit was sentenced several times for "incitation to racial hatred."

== Books ==
- La dictature des loges (edited by Baudinière; Paris: Éditions Baudinière, 1934)
- La Maçonnerie à l'oeuvre. Alexandre de Yougoslavie, victime d'une conjuration maçonnique (Paris: Nouvelles éditions nationales, 1935)
  - Translated into German as Der Mord an dem König Alexander von Serbien ein Freimaurerwerk (Erfurt: U. Bodung-Verlag, 1936)
- Le drame maçonnique (co-authored by Jean Drault; Paris: Nouvelles éditions latines, 1936)
- L'invasion juive (Paris: Centre de documentation et de propagande, 1936)
- Le règne des juifs (Paris: Centre de Documentation et de Propagande, 1937)
- Les juifs au pouvoir (published in 1936—and republished in 1938— by the Centre de Documentation et de Propagande. Translated into Romanian, Polish and Spanish)
- Rothschild: Roi d'Israël et les Américains (Nouvelles études françaises, 1941)
- L'Emancipation des Juifs en France (Éditions nouvelles, 1945)
