= Fédération d'action nationale et européenne =

Federation of National and European Action Fédération d'action nationale et européenne
- President: Mark Fredriksen
- Founded: 1966
- Dissolved: 1987
- Headquarters: France
- Newspaper: Notre Europe and L'Immonde
- Ideology: Neo-Nazism; Pan-Europeanism
- Political position: Far-right

The Fédération d'action nationale et européenne (FANE) was a small French far-right neo-Nazi organisation founded in April 1966. It was led by Mark Fredriksen, a bank employee who became involved in activism for French Algeria after serving in the paras (paratroopers) there. FANE brought together three movements: Action-Occident, the Cercle Charlemagne and the Comité de soutien à l'Europe réelle.

== Ideology and history ==
FANE activity was limited: the group had at most a hundred activists. It published a review, Notre Europe, related to François Duprat's Revolutionary Nationalist Groups (GNR), and a news sheet, L'Immonde, which exalted "National-Socialist and White" Europe and proclaimed the "struggle to the death against the Judeo-materialist hydra." Members of FANE included Luc Michel, now leader of the Parti communautaire national-européen (National European Community Party), Jacques Bastide, Michel Faci, Michel Caignet and Henri-Robert Petit, a journalist and former collaborationist who had directed the newspaper Le Pilori under the Vichy regime. The FANE maintained international contacts with the British group the League of Saint George and Pekka Siitoin's groups in Finland.

The FANE rallied Jean-Marie Le Pen's National Front in 1974, gathered around François Duprat and Alain Renault's Revolutionary Nationalist Groups (GNR). It broke with the FN again in 1978, taking with it parts of the FNJ members (youth organization of the FN).

After this brief spell in the FN, Fredriksen created the Faisceaux Nationalistes Européens (FNE) in July 1980. This group would eventually merge with the Mouvement national et social ethniste in 1987, and then with the French and European Nationalist Party (PNFE) in January 1994.

The FANE was dissolved in September 1980 by a decree of the Council of Ministers on September 30, 1980, under the third cabinet of Raymond Barre. Recreated, it was dissolved again on January 23, 1985, by Laurent Fabius's government, and a third time on September 16, 1987, by Jacques Chirac's government, on charges of "violent demonstrations organized by this movement, which has as one of its expressed objectives the establishment of a new Nazi regime," the "paramilitary organisation of this association and its incitations to racial discrimination."

== See also ==
- History of far-right movements in France
- Jeune Europe

== Bibliography ==
- Pierre Milza, L'Europe en chemise noire. Les extrêmes droites en Europe de 1945 à aujourd'hui, chapitre V, « Les principaux courants d'extrême droite dans l'Europe des Trente Glorieuses », Flammarion, collection « Champs », 2002, p. 144-145 ISBN 2-08-080083-3
