= Vigouroux =

Vigouroux is a French surname. Notable people with the surname include:

- Fulcran Vigouroux (1837–1915), French Catholic priest and scholar
- Jacques Vigouroux Duplessis (c. 1680 – 1732), French painter
- Lawrence Vigouroux (born 1993), Chilean football player
- Paul Vigouroux (1919–1980), French political activist and Nazi collaborator
- Pierre Vigouroux (born 1983), French rugby union player
- Robert Vigouroux (1923–2017), French politician and writer

== See also ==
- Saint-Martin-sous-Vigouroux, a French commune
