= Revolutionary Nationalist Groups =

The Revolutionary Nationalist Groups (French: Groupes nationalistes révolutionnaires, GNR) were a French far-right organization which gathered the revolutionary nationalist tendency between 1976 and 1978.

Founded by François Duprat and his friend, Alain Renault, they structured the radical tendency of the National Front (FN) after the rallying to the FN of the Fédération d'Action Nationale et Européenne (FANE) in 1974.

== The GNR's newspaper ==
The GNR's existence was at first restricted to the Cahiers européens, a magazine launched in the frame of the New European Order, a neo-fascist Europe-wide alliance. Mark Fredriksen, leader of the Fédération d'action nationale et européenne (FANE), who was breaking with the New European Order, became co-director of the Cahiers européens-Notre Europe until May 1975.

== The radical tendency of the National Front ==
Jean-Marie Le Pen called for GNR members to take membership in the National Front in June 1974. The GNR disappeared following the assassination of Duprat on March 18, 1978. GNR activists broke the same year with the FN, joined with parts of the FN (in particular Michel Faci "Leloup", former member of the Front national de la jeunesse, FNJ, the youth organization of the FN, and current member of the French and European Nationalist Party).

Neo-nazi members relaunched the FANE and its newspaper, Notre Europe, while activists closer to the Third Position (Jacques Bastide and Patrick Gorre) joined Jean-Gilles Malliarakis to found, on February 11, 1979, the Revolutionary Nationalist Movement (Mouvement nationaliste révolutionnaire), which became in 1985 Third Way (Troisième Voie).

== See also ==
- History of far-right movements in France
