= Pilori =

Pilori may refer to:

- the original French word and device the pillory is named after
- Au Pilori, also known as Le Pilori, a collaborationist newspaper published in occupied France during World War II
- A misspelling of Helicobacter pylori (H.Pylori), a common stomach bacteria believed to be linked to some health concerns
