= Relations between the Catholic Church and the state =

The relations between the Catholic Church and the state have been constantly evolving with various forms of government, some of them controversial in retrospect. In its history, the Church has had to deal with various concepts and systems of governance, from the Roman Empire to the medieval divine right of kings, from nineteenth- and twentieth-century concepts of democracy and pluralism to the appearance of left-wing and right-wing dictatorial regimes. The Second Vatican Council's decree Dignitatis humanae stated that religious freedom is a civil right that should be recognized in constitutional law.

== Catholicism and the Roman Emperors ==
Christianity emerged in the 1st century as one of many new religions in the Roman Empire. Early Christians were persecuted as early as 64 A.D. when Nero ordered large numbers of Christians executed in retaliation for the Great Fire of Rome. Christianity remained a growing minority religion in the empire for several centuries. Roman persecutions of Christians climaxed due to Emperor Diocletian till the turn of the 4th century. Following Constantine the Great's victory on Milvian Bridge, which he attributed to a Christian omen he saw in the sky, the Edict of Milan declared that the empire would no longer sanction persecution of Christians. Following Constantine's deathbed conversion in 337, all emperors adopted Christianity, except for Julian the Apostate who, during his brief reign, attempted unsuccessfully to re-instate paganism.

In the Christian era (more properly the era of the first seven Ecumenical Councils, 325–787) the Church came to accept that it was the emperor's duty to use secular power to enforce religious unity. Anyone within the Church who did not subscribe to Catholicism was seen as a threat to the dominance and purity of "the one true faith" and emperors saw it as their right to defend this faith by all means at their disposal.

Beginning with Edward Gibbon in The History of the Decline and Fall of the Roman Empire some historians have taken the view that Christianity weakened the Roman Empire through its failure to preserve the pluralistic structure of the state. Pagans and Jews lost interest and the Church drew the most able men into its organisation to the detriment of the state.

== The papacy and the Divine Right of Kings ==
The doctrine of the divine right of kings came to dominate medieval concepts of kingship, claiming biblical authority (Epistle to the Romans, chapter 13). Augustine of Hippo in his work The City of God had stated his opinion that while the City of Man and the City of God may stand at cross-purposes, both of them have been instituted by God and served His ultimate will. Even though the City of Man – the world of secular government – may seem ungodly and be governed by sinners, it has been placed on earth for the protection of the City of God. Therefore, monarchs have been placed on their thrones for God's purpose, and to question their authority is to question God. Augustine also said "a law that is not just, seems to be no law at all" and Thomas Aquinas indicated laws "opposed to the Divine good" must not be observed. This belief in the god-given authority of monarchs was central to the Roman Catholic vision of governance in the Middle Ages, Renaissance and Ancien Régime. But this was most true of what would later be termed the ultramontaine party and the Catholic Church has recognized republics, on an exceptional basis, as early as 1291 in the case of San Marino.

During early medieval times, a near-monopoly of the Church in matters of education and of literary skills accounts for the presence of churchmen as their advisors. This tradition continued even as education became more widespread. Prominent examples of senior members of the church hierarchy who advised monarchs were Cardinal Thomas Wolsey in England, and Cardinals Richelieu and Mazarin in France; prominent, devoutly Catholic laymen like Sir Thomas More also served as senior advisors to monarchs.

Besides advising monarchs, the Church held direct power in mediaeval society as a landowner, a power-broker, a policy maker, etc. Some of its bishops and archbishops were feudal lords in their own right, equivalent in rank and precedence to counts and dukes. Some were even sovereigns in their own right, while the Pope himself ruled the Papal States. Three archbishops played a prominent role in Holy Roman Empire as electors. As late as the early 18th century in the era of the Enlightenment, Jacques-Benigne Bossuet, preacher to Louis XIV, defended the doctrine of the divine right of kings and absolute monarchy in his sermons. The Church was a model of hierarchy in a world of hierarchies, and saw the defense of that system as its own defense, and as a defense of what it believed to be a god-ordained system.

During the French Wars of Religion, the monarchomachs began to contest the divine right of kings, setting up the bases for the theory of popular sovereignty and theorizing the right of tyrannicides.

=== The French Revolution ===
The central principle of the medieval, Renaissance, and ancien régime periods, monarchical rule "by God's will", was fundamentally challenged by the 1789 French Revolution. The revolution began as a conjunction of a need to fix French national finances and a rising middle class who resented the privileges of the clergy (in their role as the First Estate) and nobility (in their role as the Second Estate). The pent-up frustrations caused by lack of political reform over a period of generations led the revolution to spiral in ways unimaginable only a few years earlier, and indeed unplanned and unanticipated by the initial wave of reformers. Almost from the start, the revolution was a direct threat to clerical and noble privilege: the legislation that abolished the feudal privileges of the Church and nobility dates from August 4, 1789, a mere three weeks after the fall of the Bastille (although it would be several years before this legislation came fully into effect).

At the same time, the revolution also challenged the theological basis of royal authority. The doctrine of popular sovereignty directly challenged the former divine right of kings. The king was to govern on behalf of the people, and not under the orders of God. This philosophical difference over the basis of royal and state power was paralleled by the rise of a short-lived democracy, but also by a change first from absolute monarchy to constitutional monarchy and finally to republicanism.

Under the doctrine of the divine right of kings, only the Church or God could interfere with the right of a monarch to rule. Thus the attack on the French absolute monarchy was seen as an attack on God's anointed king. In addition, the Church's leadership came largely from the classes most threatened by the growing revolution. The upper clergy came from the same families as the upper nobility, and the Church was, in its own right, the largest landowner in France.

The revolution was widely seen, both by its proponents and its opponents, as the fruition of the (profoundly secular) ideas of the Enlightenment. The 1789 Declaration of the Rights of Man and of the Citizen, voted by the National Constituent Assembly, seemed to some in the church to mark the appearance of the antichrist, in that they excluded Christian morality from the new "natural order". The fast-moving nature of the revolution far outpaced Roman Catholicism's ability to adapt or come to any terms with the revolutionaries.

In speaking of "the Church and the Revolution" it is important to keep in mind that neither the Church nor the Revolution were monolithic. There were class interests and differences of opinion inside the Church as well as out, with many of the lower clergy – and a few bishops, such as Talleyrand – among the key supporters of the early phases of the revolution. The Civil Constitution of the Clergy, which turned Church lands into state property and the clergy into employees of the state, created a bitter division within the church between those "jurors" who took the required oath of allegiance to the state (the abbé Grégoire or Pierre Daunou) and the "non-jurors" who refused to do so. A majority of parish priests, but only four bishops, took the oath.

As a large-scale landowner tied closely to the doomed ancien regime, led by people from the aristocracy, and philosophically opposed to many of the fundamental principles of the revolution, the Church, like the absolute monarchy and the feudal nobility, was a target of the revolution even in the early phases, when leading revolutionaries such as Lafayette were still well-disposed toward King Louis XVI as an individual. Instead of being able to influence the new political elite and so shape the public agenda, the Church found itself sidelined at best, detested at worst. As the revolution became more radical, the new state and its leaders set up its own rival deities and religion, a Cult of Reason and, later, a deistic cult of the Supreme Being, closing many Catholic churches, transforming cathedrals into "temples of reason", disbanding monasteries and often destroying their buildings (as at Cluny), and seizing their lands. In this process many hundreds of Catholic priests were killed, further polarising revolutionaries and the Church. The revolutionary leadership also devised a revolutionary calendar to displace the Christian months and the seven-day week with its sabbath. Catholic reaction, in anti-revolutionary risings such as the revolt in the Vendée, were often bloodily suppressed.

=== France after the Revolution ===
When Napoleon Bonaparte came to power in 1799, he began the process of coming back to terms with the Catholic Church. The Church was reestablished in power during the Bourbon Restoration, with the ultra-royalists voting laws such as the Anti-Sacrilege Act. The Church was then strongly counter-revolutionary, opposing all changes made by the 1789 Revolution. The July Revolution of 1830 marked the end of any hope of a return to the ancien regime status of an absolute monarchy, by establishing a constitutional monarchy. The most reactionary aristocrats, in favor of an integral restoration of the Ancien Régime and known as Legitimists, began to retire from political life.

However, Napoleon III's regime did support the Pope, helping to restore Pope Pius IX as ruler of the Papal States in 1849 after there had been a revolt there in 1848. Despite this official move, the process of secularization continued throughout the 20th century, culminating with the Jules Ferry laws in the 1880s and then with the 1905 law on separation of Church and state, which definitively established state secularism (known as laïcité).

The Church itself remained associated with the Comte de Chambord, the Legitimist pretender to the throne. It was only under Pope Leo XIII (r: 1878–1903) that the Church leadership tried to move away from its anti-Republican associations, when he ordered the deeply unhappy French Church to accept the Third French Republic (1875–1940) (Inter innumeras sollicitudines encyclical of 1892). However, his liberalising initiative was undone by Pope Pius X (r: 1903–1914), a traditionalist who had more sympathy for the French monarchists than for the Third Republic.

=== Catholicism in the United Kingdom and Ireland ===
Following William of Orange's victories over King James II, by 1691 the supremacy of Protestantism was entrenched throughout the kingdoms of England, Scotland and Ireland. The economic and political power of Catholics, especially in Ireland, was severely curtailed. This was reinforced by the introduction of the Penal Laws. The practice of Catholicism (including the celebration of the Mass) was made illegal as Catholic priests celebrated the sacraments at risk of execution by law.

However, towards the end of the eighteenth century a rapprochement began to develop between London and the Vatican. Britain's activities abroad and relations with Catholic countries were hampered by the tension that existed between it and the Church, and it was eager to persuade the Church to end its moral support for Irish separatism. Likewise, the Church was keen to send missionaries to the newly conquered colonies of the British Empire, especially Africa and India, and to ease the restrictions on its British and Irish adherents. Britain began to phase out the penal laws, and in 1795 it financed the building of St. Patrick's College, Maynooth, a seminary for the training of Catholic priests, in County Kildare. In return, the Church agreed to actively oppose Irish separatism, which it duly did in the Irish Rebellion of 1798. It continued this policy until the early 1900s, condemning each successive attempt by Irish republicanism to achieve independence from Britain through violence.

=== Pius IX and Italian unification ===
Over the course of the 19th century, Italian nationalism put increasing strain on the Pope's rule of the Papal States. Italian unification culminated in Garibaldi's capture of Rome in 1870, which ended the Catholic Church's temporal sovereignty and led Pope Pius IX to declare himself a prisoner in the Vatican. The conflict between the Italian state and the Papacy continued with the state's regulation of the Church and the Pope's voting and parliamentary boycott, and was finally resolved in 1929 by the Lateran Treaty between Mussolini and Pope Pius XI, confirming the Vatican City-State and accepting the loss of the Papal States.

=== Leo XIII ===
Pope Leo XIII, responding to the rise of popular democracy, tried a new and somewhat more sophisticated approach to political questions than his predecessor Pius IX.

On May 15, 1891, Leo issued the encyclical Rerum novarum (Latin: "About New Things"). This addressed the transformation of politics and society during the Industrial Revolution of the nineteenth century. The document criticised capitalism, complaining of the exploitation of the masses in industry. However, it also sharply reproved the socialist concept of class struggle, and the proposed solution of eliminating private property. Leo called for strong governments to protect their citizens from exploitation, and urged Roman Catholics to apply principles of social justice in their own lives.

This document was rightly seen as a profound change in the political thinking of the Holy See. It drew on the economic thought of St Thomas Aquinas, who taught that the "just price" in a marketplace should not be allowed to fluctuate due to temporary shortages or gluts.

Seeking a principle to replace the threatening Marxist doctrine of class struggle, Rerum Novarum urged social solidarity between the upper and lower classes, and endorsed nationalism as a way of preserving traditional morality, customs, and folkways. In effect, Rerum Novarum proposed a kind of corporatism, the organisation of political power along industrial lines, similar to the mediaeval guild system. Under corporatism, the individual's place in society is determined by the ethnic, work, and social groups which one was born into or joined. Leo rejected one-person, one-vote democracy in favour of representation by interest groups. A strong government should serve as arbiter among the competing factions.

Forty years later, the corporatist tendencies of Rerum Novarum were underscored by Pope Pius XI's May 25, 1931, encyclical Quadragesimo anno ("In the Fortieth Year"), which restated the hostility of Rerum Novarum to both unbridled competition and class struggle. The precepts of Leo and Pius were espoused by the Catholic social movement of Distributism, which later influenced the Fascist and Christian Democratic movements.

== The Church and the twentieth century ==
In the 20th century, the Catholic Church embraced a Christian Democratic outlook and promoted "free institutions, the welfare state, and political democracy". The encyclicals Au Milieu des Sollicitudes and Graves de communi re of Pope Leo XIII from the late 19th century established the Church's official commitment to both Catholic social teaching and Christian democracy, which promoted democracy as the best type of governance as long as it worked to the "benefit the lower classes of society", promoted common good and rejected individualism in favor of communitarianism, and opposed what Leo XIII called "individualistic liberal" capitalism.

In that century, the Church's writings on democracy were "directly read, read and commented upon" by Christian politicians, inspiring Christian democratic parties and movements in Europe and South America. A visit by Jacques Maritain in Chile provoked a split within the Conservative Party in 1938, with a progressive Catholic faction abandoning the party to found the National Falange. According to Paul E. Sigmund, Catholic social and political thought "became a major source of democratic theory" in Latin America as well as Europe. The church also became a voice of social justice and an advocate for human rights - in the encyclicals Quas primas of 1925 and Quadragesimo Anno of 1931, Pope Pius XI declared that "Christians should defend human rights and work for justice in order to build a Christian society". His successor, Pope Pius XII, also affirmed that "the church should advocate justice so that society can become more human, but not necessarily more formally Christian", therefore writing that the Church must accept secularism and works within the realms of it to improve and protect human rights. Pius XII also endorsed parliamentary democracy as a moral necessity in his 1944 address Benignitas et Humanitas, and Pope John XXIII explicitly supported religious freedom in Pacem in Terris. These reforms eventually resulted in the Second Vatican Council, which affirmed previous teachings and established the Church as an advocate for human rights - the Catholic clergy actively opposed authoritarian regimes, and cooperated with secular resistance against them.

The association of Roman Catholicism, sometimes in the form of the hierarchical church, sometimes in the form of lay Catholic organisations acting independently of the hierarchy, produced links to dictatorial governments in various states.

=== Croatia ===
In Croatia, Axis-aligned Ustaše regime came to power in April 1941. As Kingdom of Yugoslavia was dominated by Orthodox Serbs, especially after the 6 January Dictatorship, religious affiliation became strongly associated with Yugoslav politics. In interwar Yugoslavia, "Catholics, although eminently qualified, were discriminated against in every department of the central government". This led Roman Catholicism to be linked with Croat nationalism; as a result, "religious conviction and patriotic feelings were often inseparable in the minds of individual Croats", and the Nazi-aligned Ustaše regime saw Catholicism as a potential tool to gain support of the local population and justify its genocide against Serbs. Immediately after coming to power, the new regime unleashed massacres and systematic genocide of the Serbian and Jewish population of Croatia, with almost 1 million Croat Serbs being massacred by the Ustaše and its allies. Mile Budak, the Minister of Religion of Independent State of Croatia, said on 22 July 1941:

The Ustashi movement is based on the Catholic Religion. For the minorities, Serbs, Jews and Gypsies, we have three million bullets. A part of these minorities has already been eliminated and many are waiting to be killed. Some will be sent to Serbia and the rest will be forced to change their religion to Catholicism. Our new Croatia will therefore be free of all heretics, becoming purely Catholic for the future years.

Notice the absence of a mention of Bosnian Muslims. Unlike Serbs, they were considered Croatian brothers whose ancestors converted to Islam.

Interwar Zagreb lecturer Ivan Guberina wrote that the atmosphere in interwar and WW2 was full of bitter feelings of persecution from the Yugoslav government that Croats and Catholics felt. Serbian Orthodoxy was "unrelentingly forced upon the Greek Catholic population", the government "issued school texts often carried derogatory references to the Catholic Church and the person of the pope" and Catholics were "discriminated against in every department of the central government".

The issue of clerical fascism in wartime Croatia is further discussed in the article Involvement of Croatian Catholic clergy with the Ustaša regime. However, despite being supported by right-wing Catholic organisations and press within Croatia, Catholic clergy fiercely opposed the regime. Papal legate to Yugoslavia, Ettore Felici, successfully petitioned the Vatican to forbid "active participation in movements of a patriotic and national character" in Croatia, and the Holy See opposed the "Croat rebellion against the Yugoslav state". Vatican never recognised Ustaše-led Croatia, and continued to maintain official relations with the Yugoslav government-in-exile instead. On 23 April 1941, merely two weeks after the fascist regime took power, the Archbishop of Zagreb Aloysius Stepinac issued his first statement condemning the regime for its antisemitic policies. The protests of the Catholic clergy grew, and by 1942, Stepinac wrote to Andrija Artuković: "Recently there has been talk of the arrest of Jews and of their being taken to concentration camps. In so far as there is really something to this, I take the liberty, Mr. Minister, of asking you to prevent, through your power, all unjust proceedings against citizens who individually can be accused of no wrong." Following this statement, the attitude of the Vatican and the Catholic clergy towards the Ustaša regime "grew increasingly hostile as the Primate's requests were thrust aside".

Archbishop Stepinac and the rest of the Catholic clergy in Croatia also cooperated with the Archbishop of Belgrade Josip Ujčić and petitioned the Croat government to release Serbian prisoners and the Serbian Orthodox clergy, accusing the regime of imprisoning and persecuting Jewish and Serbian Croats for purely political reasons, with Stepinac arguing that "whatever crimes the Serbs had committed against the Croats in the past paled in comparison to the inhuman slaughter which seemed to an integral part of the conduct of the free Croatian state." Vatican also spoke against forced conversions of Orthodox Croats to Catholicism, denouncing them as invalid and reaffirming the Church's absolute authority over all conversions. According to Richard J. Wolff, "although the government continued to force thousands of Orthodox Serbs to convert to Roman Catholicism and to inflict the most outrageous crimes upon countless others, the Croatian hierarchy never ceased to demand an end to this abuse." Condemnations of the clergy continued, undermining the regime's claims of its Political Catholicism, and Archbishop Stepinac "vigorously upheld the rights of the Church and minorities against the Pavelic clique".

Ivan Grubišić, a Catholic priest and a member of the Croatian Parliament fought for termination or revision of the Treaties between the Republic of Croatia and the Holy See, which were deemed to unbalance the relations between the Church and the Croatian state.

=== Spain ===
As the Second Spanish Republic was established, the initial attitude of the Church was supportive – the Vatican recognised the new government as legitimate, and the Holy See "gave an order to all bishops within Spain to write a pastoral letter declaring the Republic as legitimate". However, the relationship between the Church and the Spanish government quickly turned sour as the government enacted aggressive anti-clerical policies, such as forcefully dissolving the Jesuits and nationalizing the Church's possessions. The anti-clerical policies were condemned by the clergy, and were "wildly unpopular in all but the most anticlerical circles". As the situation turned violatile and street violence in Spain continued to escalate, Catholic clergy urged the population to stay calm, and the Cardinal Francisco Vidal y Barraquer strongly condemned calls for violent uprising against the government amongst monarchist and right-wing groups.

Nicola Rooney argues that although support for the Francoist forces amongst Spanish clergy during the Spanish Civil War was mixed, "the regime had managed to exile a significant number of its opponents, thereby giving the illusion of unanimous support from the Church." Many Catholic priests came to the defense of the Republic – Maximiliano Arboleya urged for peace and asked Spanish Catholics to remain loyal to the Republican regime, José Manuel Gallegos Rocafull stressed the need to preserve Spanish democracy and pressured the Republican government to police anti-clerical socialist militias, and many respected Catholic personalities spoke in favour of the Second Republic as well, such as Ángel Ossorio y Gallardo and José Bergamín. According to Spanish historian Antonio Fernández Garcia, the greater part of the organized Church did not willingly cooperate with the Franco forces during the war. Many Spanish priests, such as Leocadio Lobo of San Gínes denounced the Francoist cooperation with the fascist governments of Germany and Italy, and thus considered backing Franco incompatible with Catholic teachings. Franciscan theologian Luis Sarasola Acarregui (1883–1942) claimed that "all Spanish Catholics—the most eminent ones—condemn the civil war, and have resolutely sided with the Government of the Republic", while Ángel Ossorio y Gallardo concluded that "a sincere Christian apostolate is much more likely to succeed on the Popular Front than on the opposite side". The clergy was especially pro-Republican in the Basque provinces, where an overwhelming majority of the clergy endorsed the Republic; as the Basque people were known for being "among the most ardent Catholics in all of Spain", it made the Francoist forces difficult to present themselves as the Catholic option "when the most concentrated Catholic stronghold in Spain had declared itself for the Republic".

On 14 September 1936, the issue of the civil war was addressed by the Vatican for the first time; Pope Pius XI made a speech in which he condemned communism as well as the horrors of war. The Pope condemned the part of the clergy that tried to justify the war, ordering them to "alleviate the suffering of the war" instead. According to Benjamin DeLeo, "the Pope said the exact opposite of what the Nationalists in the crowd wanted to hear", and the apparent lack of support by the Catholic Church dismayed the Nationalist forces. The Vatican also did not recognise the Nationalist government until 1939.

After the end of the Spanish Civil War, the Spanish Catholic Church was severely devastated; over a half of Spanish parishes had their churches burned or their priests murdered. In Catalonia, over one-third of Catholic priest had been murdered. Andrew Dowling wrote that by 1939, the "religious life was almost eradicated" in Catalonia. Most of religious events had to take place outside or in schools because of lack of religious building, while in some parts of Spain religious presence became non-existent. It was in this atmosphere that the Church signed a Concordat with the new regime in 1953, although Vatican was reluctant to do so and forced significant concessions from the regime. The Concordat was seen as an opportunity to avoid further anti-clerical violence or persecution, and was also influenced by the pro-Franco policy of the United States under President Eisenhower.

Beginning in the 1950s, the Catholic Church grew critical of the Francoist regime. In Catalonia, the church used its position to foster Catalan nationalism—while publishing in Catalan language was illegal under the Francoist regime, the Church was exempt from this ban thanks to the Concordat, which meant that "the only way that Catalanism could be expressed would be through the Church." The Catholic clergy started publishing journals and preaching sermons in Catalan, which became a "launch-pad for a pre-political programme of a Catholic revival of cultural Catalanism." Because of this, the Church soon became a base of anti-Francoist resistance in Catalonia; in 1957, an exile Catalan nationalist newspaper in Venezuela Solidaritat Catalana noted that "There is a strong tendency on the part of many Catholic sectors to adopt a combative attitude against the regime." With the help of local clergy, Catholic churches served as shelters for illegal trade unions and anti-Francoist parties, as "the sanctity of the church, codified in Franco's 1953 Vatican Concordat, assured that the meeting would not be interrupted by the police". According to Rooney, "members of clergy were to play a leading role in the opposition to the dictatorship"; this was particularly true for the Catholic clergy in "Basque Country and Catalonia, where the clergy were actively involved in regional nationalism, and also for those priests from Catholic worker organisations who took up the defence of striking workers". As the opposition from the Catholic Church intensified, the Franco regime soon started acting against the clergy, and a prison for Catholic priests called Concordat Prison was created. Hank Johnston and Jozef Figa also argue that in Spain, "the church was crucial in the nationalist and working-class wings of the anti-Francoist movement", and the growing opposition to the dictatorship intensified in the 1960s thanks to Vatican II, which made the regime start "fining priests for their sermons, jailing members of the clergy, and considering the expulsion of a bishop, thereby risking the excommunication of the government".

=== France ===
The pro-Catholic movement Action Française (AF) campaigned for the return of the monarchy and for aggressive action against Jews, as well as a corporatist system. It was supported by a strong section of the clerical hierarchy, eleven out of seventeen cardinals and bishops. On the other hand, many Catholics regarded the AF with distrust, and in 1926, Pope Pius XI explicitly condemned the organization. Several writings of Charles Maurras', the leading ideologist of AF and an agnostic, were placed on the Index Librorum Prohibitorum at the same time. However, in 1939 Pope Pius XII waived the condemnation. Maurras' personal secretary, Jean Ousset, later went on to found the Cité catholique fundamentalist organization along with former members of the OAS terrorist group created in defense of "French Algeria" during the Algerian War.

According to John Hellman, "Not long before he died, Lenin told a French Catholic visitor that "only Communism and Catholicism offered two diverse, complete and inconfusible conceptions of human life". This led Maurice Thorez of the French Communist Party to offer "an outstretched hand" to French Catholics in 1936, wishing "to achieve a tactical alliance to head off fascism in France and Europe and to promote social progress". A large number of French Catholics did enter a dialogue with the party, but to Thorez's surprise, "these Catholics were not, for the most part, the Catholic workers, clerks, artisans, peasants to whom Maurice Thorez had addressed his appeal, but rather Catholic philosophers, "social priests," journalists, and cardinals". While Catholics were wary of the socialist concept of the revolution, and strongly opposed to the atheism of most socialist movements, "strong criticism of capitalism and economic liberalism was a persistent theme in episcopal pronouncements and Catholic literature". The attempt of a Communist-Catholic unity in France is considered successful, as most French Catholics were opposed to fascism and when offered an alliance on grounds of anti-fascist unity, "saw the Communist offer as a religious and moral rather than political issue".

=== Ireland ===
The Catholic Church in Ireland played a key role in uniting various strata of the Irish society, forging the unity that allowed Irish nationalism to become a mass movement. The Church gained a reputation of a nationalist and anti-British force in late 19th and early 20th century, as it clashed with the British government and advanced Irish causes. Establishing its identity as a persecuted church that stood opposed to the British presence in Ireland, Catholicism became a source of the Irish identity. As such, when Irish Free State was established in 1922, Catholic and nationalist values were "subscribed to by the vast majority of the population"; the Church had a profound influence on the legislature of the new Irish state. However, although the Church had a marked influence on both Irish state and its identity, "practical politics were, to a great extent, left to the laity under the general supervision of the hierarchy."

Despite the fact that the Church was "overwhelmingly dominant" in 20th-century Ireland, the Irish Constitution of 1922 was of secular character and followed the ideals of the separation between church and state, and was supported by the Irish clergy. The clergy as well as Catholic nationalist circles and newspapers such as the Catholic Bulletin focused on what they considered "the absence of a spirit of Gaelicism or an active sense of nationality", condemning English-language literature as a sign of Ireland being "shackled by an alien tongue", attacking perceived non-Gaelic or "adventitious" elements in the post-WWI Irish society and stressing the need to revive the traditional Hidden Ireland, devoid of Anglo-Irish influences, as definited by Daniel Corkery. Militant Gaelicism expressed by Catholic circles as well as the clergy itself, such as the Jesuit Timothy Corcoran, actively pressured the government towards Gaelicisation measures.

Early nationalist government of the Free State concerned itself with administrative measures such as the police force (Gardá Síochána Act of 1923), the economy (Finance Act of 1923) and local governments (Lo Act of 1923), with "no trace of the influence of Catholicism". However, the government did rely heavily on Political Catholicism in social policy, where the government's decisions were heavily dictated by the Catholic teaching and the Church's will. The government gave the Church profound control over its education, with Thomas Derrig, the Minister for Education, saying in 1938: "I think that I am justified in saying that in no country in the world does a national system of education approach the Catholic ideal system as in the Free State." As a result, "the Catholic Church became the most powerful ally of the new state, lending the weight of its immense authority to the cause of law and order and placing at the disposal of the new, mainly Catholic state its biggest ecclesiastical stake, namely its schools and system of clerical management." Once Fianna Fáil emerged in Irish politics in 1926, the opinion in the country was polarising into the middle-class Irish voters who were content with status quo, and rural and working-class voters who felt alienated by liberal capitalism and desired an economic system based on ideals of Christian corporatism and Catholic social teaching. According to Patricia A. Lamoureux, the history of the Catholic Church in Ireland "reveals a tradition of cooperation with organized labor"; the Church was especially popular amongst the Irish working class, more religious than their middle-class counterparts and more involved with the Church by participating in Catholic trade unions. The Catholic Church used its power to organise to found and direct trade unions, which "earned the Catholic church a reputation as a friend of the labor movement". In 1929, diplomatic representatives were exchanged between the Vatican and the Irish Free State, and the relations between the Irish government and the Holy See grew friendler, with one speaker from the governmental benches saying: "Our whole history has received its dominating characteristics from our adhesion to the principles of the Catholic religion, of which the visible head is the Bishop of Rome. For the vast majority of our people ... this present stage of our history has been pre-determined in all its details by our fidelity to the Church of Rome". In this atmosphere, Fianna Fáil's strategy to gain voters was based on portraying itself as an ultra-Catholic party, even more so than the current government. In the same year, Seán T. O'Kelly said: "We of the Fianna Fáil party believe that we speak for the big body of Catholic opinion. I think I could say, without qualification of any kind, that we represent the big element of Catholicity".

In the Irish Free State, the Catholic social movements were "going from strength to strength", having an overwhelming number of adherents in both the general society as well as the government itself. As the result, the Catholic clergy had powerful, although indirect, influence in Irish politics. Despite this, the influence of the clergy was not necessarily pushing the country in a right-wing or reactionary direction, as Irish priests envisioned political Catholicism as a force that should adhere to the ideals of Christian democracy, Gaelicism and moderation. In 1929, Bishop Patrick Morrisroe advised: "Though not formally Catholic, our Government at the same time legislates for Catholics in the main, so that its laws, while not oppressive in any section, should take special account of the needs of the overwhelming portion of its subjects." Ultimately, a new constitution was written and put into law in 1937; Éamon de Valera actively sought the advice of Papal Nuncio and Cardinal MacRory on the issue, and under their advice the new Constitution did not contain exclusive recognition of the Catholic Church - along with recognising the "special position" of the Church, other churches in Ireland were also given special recognition, which was seen as necessary for both the democratic process and prevention of sectarian violence.

Ireland remained a highly religious society until 1960s - as late as in the 1950s, the image of Ireland was still one of a Catholic society that "had preserved a purity of faith in the face of persecution and famine". On his visit to Ireland in the 1950s, Archbishop Peter McKeefry praised Ireland as "a land of faith ... a faith that permeates every phase of personal, social and national life. It could be seen every moment of the day, be it in church, on a street car." However, with the advent of secularism following the end of WW2, both the Church as well as the Irish society itself underwent changes and tilted in liberal direction. Starting in the 1960s, the Catholic Church would rapidly lose its influence on the Irish society - unlike in 1937, the government no longer sought the advice of the clergy on political matters, and even came close to openly defying the Church; while anti-Catholicism amongst the Protestant minorities had mostly faded away by the 1960s, it was now replaced by anti-clericalism of liberal groups and movements. However, the Church itself also liberalised thanks to Vatican II - the Church accepted the increasing secularization of the Irish society, and in 1959 Father Peter Connelly wrote: "... the Church ought not compromise her moral authority with the compulsions of civil law nor ought the State intrude into the private moral life unless ‘‘public morality’’ or ‘‘the public order’’ is being menaced. Civil law does not deal formally with sin." In the 1960s and 1970s, many Catholic bishops issued similar statements, clarifying that the Church expects the government to uphold Irish democracy rather than "uphold the Catholic moral order". According to Louise Fuller of the National University of Ireland, by the time of the Second Vatican Council, Catholic ideology in Ireland became a democratic one that "emphasized love rather than adherence to rules and had a positive rather than a negative view of human nature." John Henry Whyte writes that "Catholic social teaching remained very active but less ideological" and argues that the Church "became more concerned with the actual needs of people" and no longer sought to dominate various social fields such as education or healthcare, closely cooperating and coordinating its efforts with the state on these issues instead. The Church also liberalised on social matters such as feminism, as the Irish "nuns came to challenge their subordinate role within the Church, criticized the patriarchal traditions of the Church and urged it to become more involved in the concerns of the poor". As such, political Catholics shifted towards the left, with many embracing liberation theology or progressive Catholicism. Vatican II also urged the need for the Church to advocate for democracy above all else, even if at the cost of hitherto Catholic dominance in Irish society and politics, with Cardinal Cahal Daly writing: "The Catholic Church totally rejects the concept of a confessional State […] the Catholic Church seeks only the freedom to proclaim the Gospel […] We have repeatedly declared that we in no way seek to have the moral teaching of the Catholic Church become the criterion of constitutional change or to have the principles of Catholic faith enshrined in civil law."

=== Austria ===
In Austria, Engelbert Dollfuss turned a Roman Catholic political party into the single party of a one-party state. In rural Austria the Catholic Christian Social Party collaborated with the Heimwehr militia and helped bring Dollfuss to power in 1932. In June 1934, he produced his authoritarian constitution which stated "We shall establish a state on the basis of a Christian Weltanschauung". The Pope described Dollfuss as a "Christian, giant-hearted man ... who rules Austria so well, so resolutely and in such a Christian manner. His actions are witness to Catholic visions and convictions. The Austrian people, Our beloved Austria, now has the government it deserves".

=== Poland ===
In Poland, in 1920s Józef Piłsudski founded a military-style government (Sanacja) that incorporated Catholic corporatism into its ideology. After the Second World War the Catholic Church was a focal point of opposition to the Communist regime. Many Catholic priests were arrested or disappeared for opposing the communist regime of People's Republic of Poland. Pope John Paul II encouraged opposition to the Communist regime in such a way that it would not draw retaliation, becoming (in a quote from CNN) "a resilient enemy of Communism and champion of human rights, a powerful preacher and sophisticated intellectual able to defeat Marxists in their own line of dialogue." After the fall of the Soviet Union, Poland became a multiparty democracy and several parties which professed to defend Catholicism were legalised, like Akcja Wyborcza Solidarność or Liga Polskich Rodzin.

=== Fascism ===
Commenting on the rise of fascism in interwar Europe, Giuseppe Pizzardo condemned "fascist totalitarianism" as being "at the opposite extreme from the Christian and Catholic conceptions of social existence, the state, and international relations." Emilio Gentile highlights that Pizzardo was considered highly conservative, which shows hostile attitude towards fascism even among the reactionary circles of the Catholic clergy. According to Gentile, Catholic anti-fascists considered fascism was considered a political religion that inherently competeted with the Catholic Church for social influence; Igino Giordani called fascism a modern version of Caesaropapism that wishes to subjugate the Church, while Luigi Sturzo argued that fascism is fundamentally incompatible with Catholicism because instead of promoting Catholic values and Catholic state, "fascism wants to be worshipped for itself, and wishes to create a Fascist state."

Historians such as Emilio Gentile, Roger Griffin and Renato Moro argue that Catholics were generally opposed to fascism, and in national contexts the Church either opposed fascism or played a 'moderating' role in order to assert its position. Philip Morgan of the University of Hull writes that Catholics were considered enemies by Italian fascists, with Roberto Farinacci identifying "the leaders and members of Catholic organisations" as key opponents of the fascist regime. Adrian Lyttelton argues that fascism itself was anti-clerical - Benito Mussolini himself was an atheist "distinguished by his hatred of the Church", who often attacked the Vatican as well as Catholics themselves; many Italian fascists called for the "de-Vaticanization" of Italy, and the Fascist Manifesto itself was anti-Catholic as well. According to Lyttelton, "the typical Fascist enthusiast ranked the priest only a short way after the Socialist agitator in his list of enemies". The Church started distancing itself from fascist and nationalist regimes as early in 1926, when the Holy Office published a decree condemning Action Française, and afterwards "Vatican continued to make use of the Index to combat the danger of Fascist deviations in Catholic doctrine".

In 1929, the Church banned books of a fascist journalist Mario Missiroli who advocated for a "conciliation" between Catholicism and Mussolini's fascist state, and in 1934 the works of Giovanni Gentile were banned as well. Particularly offensive to Mussolini was the ban of the books of Alfredo Oriani, whom he considered "a favourite author of the regime". In 1929, La Civiltà Cattolica, one of the oldest Catholic periodicals in Italy and one that is directly controlled and revised by the Holy See, harshly condemned fascism and compared Mussolini's attitude towards the Church to Napoleon's. Pope Pius XI also took a firm stand against the concept of fascist and totalitarian regimes, denouncing fascism in his Christmas Allocution of 1926, and again in 1931 in his encyclical Non abbiamo bisogno, where the Pope condemned Italian fascism as anti-Catholic and an ideology of "hatred, violence and irreverence". Fascist press attacked the Catholic Church as well, denouncing it as an institution of anti-fascism and accusing it of interfering in state affairs. In 1932, The Doctrine of Fascism written by Giovanni Gentile and Mussolini also described fascism as "educating to a spiritual life and promoting it", which was condemned by the Pope as anti-Christian and seeking to replace Catholicism. Other members of the clergy such as the Cardinal Alfredo Ildefonso Schuster, also attacked fascism, with Schuster describing it as a "philosophical-religious system" and "Hegelian statolatry". In late 1935, Cardinal Domenico Tardini, who was the Sustituto of the Congregation of Ordinary Ecclesiastical Affairs at the time, released a document called "Thirteen Years of Fascism" on behalf of Pope Pius XI, which strongly condemned the Italian regime as well as the Italian invasion of Ethiopia. The document argued that "a whim of the Duce is the ruin of Italy", and attacked Italians that were "gripped by the demon of Nationalism and who believe more in Mussolini than in the Pope".

==== Italy ====
The relationship between fascist Italy and the Catholic Church can be divided into three periods – prior to the March on Rome, the Church was hostile to the fascist movement and was openly denounced by the clergy as well as Catholic organisations. After the fascist government was formed, relations were steadily improving as Mussolini sought to appease Rome and improve the public as well as foreign opinion of the regime, which eventually led to the Lateran Treaty of 1929. Starting in 1931, the Church was growing increasingly opposed to the regime, particularly in the context of its anti-clerical policies and bans of Catholic organisations such as the Azione Cattolica. The Church became openly hostile towards the Italian fascist regime in the mid-1930s, once it started cooperating with the German regime, acquiesced in the annexation of Austria in 1938 and implemented Racial Laws, to which the Church was strongly opposed. In 1938, Pius XI strongly condemned antisemitic laws and stated: "Christians are not permitted to take part in anti-Semitism. ... Spiritually we are all Semites"; according to Emma Fattorini, Pius "concluded that the aims of fascism and the Catholic Church were incompatible". Following the implementation of the racial laws, fascist informers remarked that "the clergy and the practising Catholics make clear that they deplore, as persecution, the measures aimed at the Jews". The Church refused to recognise the Italian Social Republic in 1943, and used its privileged status to give shelter to anti-fascist activists. The Catholic Church became a centre of clandestine anti-fascist resistance in Italy during World War II, which allowed Christian Democrats to emerge as the strongest force in the resistance as well as post-WW2 Italian politics. Adrian Lyttelton argues that "the single most important national institution to make the transition from Fascism to democracy was the Catholic Church", while Richard A. Webster notes that "in conditions of ever tighter totalitarian control, the Church was one of the few institutions in Italy that Fascism never penetrated".

During the unstable period in Italy called Biennio Rosso, marked by strikes, protests and clashes between socialist groups and fascist Blackshirts, the Church was strongly critical of Italian fascists, and Catholic media such as the newspaper La Civiltà Cattolica referred to fascism as an evil and anti-Christian movement. In this period, Catholic social and workers' movements established local control in most of Italy, especially in the northern Areas such as Veneto, Bergamo and Brescia; Catholics formed worker leagues, mutual-aid societies, cooperatives and rural banks. Catholic subculture was dominant in Italy as local priests, Catholic organisations and newspapers had constructed a "Catholic world". This Catholic subculture and organisations, especially Catholic trade unions that were associated with it, were known as "white" in contrast to "red" worker movements that followed socialism rather than Catholic social teaching or distributism. According to John M. Foot, the Catholic movement was staunchly anti-fascist and leaned towards the political left; Foot remarks that Catholic trade unions were often "more militant than those of the 'reds' and entered into violent conflict with the landowners or textile bosses". As such, Catholics in the 1920s Italy were left-wing, largely immune to Blackshirt agitation and were ready to enter "workers' unity" alliances with socialist trade unions for the sake of anti-fascism. Local Catholic socialist leaders emerged, such as Romano Cocchi at Bergamo and Giuseppe Speranzini in Verona. The presence of such "Left-Catholics" was strong, and a strike organised by left Catholic unions in Verona gathered 150,000 'white' workers. Ultimately, no lasting alliance between the 'red' socialist and 'white' Catholic organisations was successful as both sides remained largely unwilling to cooperate despite their anti-fascist outlook. Socialist unions would often refuse to participate in strikes organised by white leagues, allowing local landowners to use the Socialist-Catholic split to their advantage and isolate trade unions from each other. Catholic newspapers such as L'Italia criticised 'red' unions for their neutrality, writing in 1919 that there was a "tight link between our red adversaries and the ruling class". The PSI maintained a hostile attitude towards the Catholic Left; in 1920, Alfonso Leonetti stated that Catholic workers were a "true obstacle" to the revolution and equated them to fascist Blackshirts, arguing that the PSI would have to "fight the left-catholics with greater force than those on the right". Foot notes that only individual socialists such as Antonio Gramsci explored the prospect of an anti-fascist alliance with the Catholic left. Catholic leagues and trade unions were condemned by the fascist press as "white Bolshevik" and "communist". Cladia Baldoli remarked that although no lasting alliances between the 'red' and 'white' organisations were made, Catholic organisations fiercely opposed the Blackshirts, and their protests were often "more radical than the ones employed by socialism, and were indeed remembered during Mussolini's regime as forms of ‘White Bolshevism’."

==== Germany ====
The division of Germans between Catholicism and Protestantism has figured into German politics since the Protestant Reformation. The Kulturkampf that followed German unification was the defining dispute between the German state and Catholicism.

In Weimar Germany, the Centre Party was the Catholic political party. It disbanded around the time of the signing of the Reichskonkordat (1933), the treaty that continues to regulate church-state relations to this day. Pius XI's encyclical Mit brennender Sorge (1937) protested what it perceived to be violations of the Reichskonkordat. The role of Catholic bishops in Nazi Germany remains a controversial aspect of the study of Pope Pius XII and the Holocaust.

According to Robert A. Krieg, "Catholic bishops, priests, and lay leaders had criticized National Socialism since its inception in the early 1920s", while The Sewanee Review remarked in 1934 that even "when the Hitler movement was still small and apparently insignificant, German Catholic ecclesiastics recognized its inherent threat to certain beliefs and principles of their Church". Catholic sermons and newspapers vigorously denounced Nazism and accused it of espousing neopaganism, and Catholic priests forbade believers from joining the NSDAP. Waldemar Gurian noted that the upper Catholic bishops issued several condemnations of the NSDAP starting in 1930 and 1931, and describing the relations between the National Socialism and the Catholic Church, concluded that "though there has been no legal declaration of war, a war is nevertheless going on."

Ludwig Maria Hugo was the first Catholic bishop to condemn membership in the Nazi party, and in 1931 Cardinal Michael von Faulhaber wrote that "[t]he bishops as guardians of the true teachings of faith and morals must issue a warning about National Socialism, so long as and insofar as it maintains cultural-political views that are not reconcilable with Catholic doctrine." Cardinal Faulhaber's outspoken criticism of National Socialism gained widespread attention and support from German Catholic churches, and Cardinal Adolf Bertram called German Catholics to oppose National Socialism in its entirety because it "stands in the most pointed contradiction to the fundamental truths of Christianity". According to the Sewanee Review, "Catholics were expressly forbidden to become registered members of the National Socialist party; disobedient Catholics were refused admission to the sacraments; groups in Nazi uniform and with Nazi banners were not admitted to church services". The condemnations of Nazism by Bertram and von Faulhaber reflected the views of most German Catholics, but many of them were also disillusioned with the institutions of the Weimar Republic.

According to Italian historian Emma Fattorini, Vatican was increasingly concerned about the rise of Nazism in Germany, and Pope Pius XI believed that National Socialism is a larger threat to Catholicism than Communism. Hostility between the Vatican and the Nazi Regime resulted in the publication of the papal encyclical Mit Brennender Sorge in 1937. Mit Brennender Sorge directly attacked and condemned National Socialism. The encyclical forcefully condemned the Nazi regime as well as its policies, especially antisemitic laws as well as numerous breaches of the Reichskonkordat. The encyclical stated that National Socialism is incompatible with both Catholic faith and Catholic ethics, and called upon Catholics to stand against the "so-called myth of blood and race" espoused by Nazism. Frank J. Coppa considers Mit Brennender Sorge a "forceful and dramatic condemnation of Nazi policy". As a result of aggressive stance that the Vatican took against National Socialism, Catholic clergy in Germany opposed the regime, and Catholic churches were often meeting places for the anti-Nazi resistance. In January 1939, Martin Bormann stated that the majority of Catholic clergy "stand in concealed or open opposition to National Socialism and the State led by it." An annual report by the Reich Security Main Office in 1938 criticised the Catholic Church for not only expressing clear hostility towards the Nazi regime, but also accused German Catholics of "trying to bring about the collapse of the Third Reich". Reinhard Heydrich considered Catholicism a fierce opponent of National Socialism, citing "the hostility constantly displayed by the Vatican, the negative attitude of the bishops towards the Anschluss as typified by the conduct of Bishop Sproll of Württemberg, the attempt to make the Catholic Eucharistic Congress in Budapest a demonstration of united opposition to Germany, and the continued accusations of Godlessness and of destruction of church life made by Church leaders in their pastoral letters."

==== Slovakia ====
During World War II, Jozef Tiso, a Roman Catholic monsigneur, became the Nazi quisling in Slovakia. Tiso was head of state and the security forces, as well as the leader of the paramilitary Hlinka Guard, which wore the Catholic Episcopal cross on its armbands. Slovak nationalists considered Slovakia to be an inherently Catholic nation, and Catholicism was seen as a fundamental part of Slovak identity; to this end, the Catholic clergy was highly active in both social and political scene of the Slovak nation—approximately 80% of Slovaks were members of the Catholic Church during World War II. Slovak government was divided between the clerical-fascist wing of Jozef Tiso, and the pro-German National Socialist wing led by Vojtech Tuka. The Slovak government had a high proportion of Roman Catholic priests as well as religious Catholics; however, Richard J. Wolff argues that this was the result of prominent position of the Catholic Church in the national life of Slovakia, and such situation "may have arisen in a truly democratic state as well". The Slovak People's Party that ruled the First Slovak Republic was founded by a Catholic priest Andrej Hlinka; the party was authoritarian and nationalist, and included elements of Catholic social doctrines as an element of its ideology, along with a Catholic narrative. Although the party used religious imagery, it was unable to gain a Catholic following because of the strong German influence on the regime. As the persecution of the Catholic Church in Germany, Austria and Poland became apparent, the Church in Slovakia was seen as an opponent to influence of Nazi Germany.

Despite its Catholic and clerical nature, the Vatican was critical of the Slovak regime; Pope Pius XI discouraged clerical participation and support of the regime, and monsignor Domenico Tardini informed Tiso that "the Holy See does not look with pleasure" upon his appointment as the president of Slovakia. Wolff notes that "The Vatican consistently demonstrated its uneasiness as Catholic Slovakia drew further into the German web", and the Catholic hierarchy constantly clashed with Tiso and his government over its pro-German and fascist policies. The Church was concerned with "Nazi advances" that were implemented by the regime, and also sought to preserve its profound social influence. According to Wolff, "the ultimate test of strength between the Church and Nazism in Slovakia centered upon the struggle over the fate of the country's Jewish population." The Vatican strongly opposed antisemitic legislation that was systematically implemente in Slovakia; the "Jewish Code" based on the Nuremberg Laws introduced in German was declared contrary to Catholic principles. Cardinal Luigi Maglione issued an official protest to the law on behalf of the Vatican, writing that "it is with great sadness that the Holy See witnessed the promulgation of a law which was in open contrast to Catholic principles in an overwhelming Catholic country". Strong protests of the Vatican emboldened Slovak bishops and Catholic organisations, which strongly criticised the government for persecuting Slovak Jews; in a Catholic newspaper Katolícke Noviny, Catholic hierarchy condemned antisemitic actions of the regime. In response, Vojtek Tucha criticised the Slovak clergy for protecting the "interests of the Jews and in many cases non-baptized Jews".

According to John S. Conway, although the representatives of the Slovak government claimed to follow Catholic values and presented themselves as independent from Germany, Slovak Catholics were largely unsupportive of the regime. Conway remarks that "the Christian tradition increasingly came to be seen as an element of resistance against Nazi influence", and the Sicherheitsdienst reports often mentioned widespread "anti-German or anti-Nazi attitudes of the Slovak clergy". A report by the German intelligence service in Slovakia in May 1940 stated that "the activity of the Catholic Church in Slovakia must be described as completely anti-German". The Church used its influence to direct rescue efforts for Slovak Jews, spread anti-German sentiments and often tried to prevent the introduction of further antisemitic laws. Humanitarian efforts by the clergy were in conflict with the racial policies of the Slovak government, and antisemitic actions of the regime were often presented as a product of German interference, imposed on Slovakia against the will of the population. According to Livia Rothkirchen, the Catholic Church was considered a formidable obstacle to Holocaust in Slovakia, with a German report from 12 January 1943, reporting that "a final solution of the Jewish question in Slovakia will in particular be opposed by the Catholic Church, which under the disguise of love of one's neighbour and other humanitarian sentiments, hinders any decisive steps against the plague of Jewry in Slovakia". Local clergy supported the anti-Nazi resistance, which eventually culminated in the Slovak National Uprising. Conway notes that the Catholic clergy were ready to join the insurgents, and after the German suppression of the uprising, many in Slovakia saw the country as having to choose between submission to Germany or surrender to the advancing Russian armies. In this situation, Catholic churchmen "often welcomed the latter development".

==== Belgium ====
The Constitution of Belgium established Belgium as a liberal democracy, with the constitution being one of the most liberal at the time. According to Bruno De Wever, the Catholic Church was supportive of liberal democracy in Belgium, as no anti-clerical policies were implemented unlike in France or Italy. De Wever notes that even "the ultramontane movement in Belgian Catholicism signed up to the Belgian constitutional institutions", and the constitutional freedoms provided a possibility for the Church to build a Catholic network of political and social movements and organisations. Political Catholicism was strong and dominating force in Belgium, as Catholic faith was widespread; in the 1930s, 98% of Belgian children were baptised, 80% of marriages were consecrated, and an overwhelming majority of Belgians attended Mass.

From 1884 to 1914, Belgium was ruled by a pro-clerical Catholic Party, with the Church enjoying both profound support and influence on Belgian politics. As Catholics were not alienated by political liberalism, the Catholic Party fully respected the liberal constitution of 1830, and despite its very strong influence, the Catholic hierarchy respected the division between religious and political matters. However, despite liberal leanings of Belgian Catholicism, ultramontanism and conservatism also became widespread within the Flemish movement, which emerged as a response to the domination of French-speaking elite in Belgian politics. The Flemish movement demanded equal rights for Dutch language and advocated for Flemish independence while also incorporating anti-liberalism. The Flemish movement grew dominant following the First World War, particularly in response to rising socialism and anti-clericalism. In Wallonia, radicalized French-speaking Catholic conservatives and veterans started founding fascist and far-right parties and organisations, with a far-right Rexist Party emerging in 1935.

The Rexist Party of Léon Degrelle promoted rhetoric that combined fascist tendencies with Political Catholicism, courting radicalised Catholics; De Wever describes Rexist rhetoric as "a right-wing populist mash". In Flanders, radicalised Flemish nationalists founded Verdinaso in 1931, a far-right party that modelled itself on Catholic social teaching while also promoting ultra-nationalism. In 1933, the Flemish National League was found, which also tried to combine Political Catholicism with a fascistic programme, promoting xenophobia and antisemitism as well. Both Rexists and the FNL won seats in the 1936 Belgian general election at the expense of the Christian democrat Catholic Party. Despite this, the Catholic Party rejected to form a coalition with far-right movements, and the Catholic hierarchy denounced the Rexists and continued to support the Catholic Party; in the 1939 Belgian general election, electoral support of both the Rexist Party and FNL greatly declined. In 1930s Belgium, the Vatican and the local clergy promoted Christian democracy as the basis of political Catholicism. Far-right movements were often denounced as foreign and German; De Wever notes that "the socialists, liberals and Christian movements fought the FNL as a fascist and pro-German party – for good reason: Staf De Clercq and some of the other FNL leaders had secret contacts with the Abwehr, the German military secret service".

During the German occupation of Belgium during World War II, the Catholic clergy engaged in passive resistance, avoiding confrontation with German authorities while remaining hostile to Catholic collaborators. When the leader of collaborationist FNL, Staf De Clercq, died in 1942, the Catholic Church refused to organise his funeral, forcing the ceremony to be secular and open-air. According to De Wever, collaborationist and far-right movements were shunned by Catholic political elites, with fascism and Catholicism remaining separate and hostile social networks within Belgium; when Rexists were facing a dilemma between collaborating with Germany and joining the Catholic resistance, "their ultra-nationalism prevailed over Catholic solidarity".

=== United States ===
Prior to 1961, the U.S. had never had a Catholic president. Many Protestants were afraid that if a Catholic were elected president, he would take orders directly from the Pope. This was one reason why Al Smith, the Democratic governor of New York, lost the 1928 presidential election to Herbert Hoover. The surprise bestseller of 1949–1950 was American Freedom and Catholic Power by Paul Blanshard. Blanshard accused the Catholic Church hierarchy of having an undue influence on legislation, education and medical practice. Years later, John F. Kennedy, spoke to a convention of Baptist pastors in Louisiana during his election campaign. He assured them that, if elected, he would put his country before his religion.

Since the late 1960s, the Catholic Church has been politically active in the U.S. around the "life issues" of abortion, assisted suicide and euthanasia, with some bishops and priests refusing communion to Catholic politicians who publicly advocate for legal abortion. This has created a stigma within the Church itself however. The church has also played significant roles in the fights over capital punishment, gay marriage, welfare, state secularism, various "peace and justice" issues, among many others. Its role varies from area to area depending upon the size of the Catholic Church in a particular region and on the region's predominant ideology. For example, a Catholic church in the Southern U.S. would be more likely to be against universal health care than a Catholic church in New England.

Robert Drinan, a Catholic priest, served five terms in Congress as a Democrat from Massachusetts before the Holy See forced him to choose between giving up his seat in Congress or being laicized. The 1983 Code of Canon Law forbids Catholic priests from holding political office anywhere in the world.

=== Argentina ===
Secularism was enforced in Argentina in 1884 when President Julio Argentino Roca passed Law 1420 on secular education. In 1955, the Catholics nationalists overthrew General Perón in the "Revolución Libertadora", and a concordat was signed in 1966. Catholic nationalists continued to play an important role in the politics of Argentina, while the Church itself was accused of having set up ratlines to organize the escape of former Nazis after WWII. Furthermore, several important Catholic figures have been accused of having supported the "Dirty War" in the 1970s, including Pope Francis, then-Archbishop of Buenos Aires. Antonio Caggiano, Archbishop of Buenos Aires from 1959 to 1975, was close to the fundamentalist Cité catholique organisation, and introduced Jean Ousset (former personal secretary of Charles Maurras, the leader of the Action française)'s theories on counter-revolutionary warfare and "subversion" in Argentina.

=== Australia ===
Traditionally, Catholics in Australia had been predominantly of Irish descent and working-class. This was noticeable in civic society and politics, where the increasingly urban Irish Catholic population played a disproportionate role in the labour movement, including the foundation of the Australian Labor Party, and were in direct political opposition to the disproportionate role in business played by Anglicans and Presbyterians who were typically involved in conservative politics. This tendency was sustained until the 1950s for most Catholics to vote Labor and for most Anglicans, Presbyterians and Methodists to vote for their conservative opponents. This divide became starkly and bitterly apparent during the First World War: Anglo-Saxon Protestants were reflexively enthusiastic supporters of the war and conscription, in line with the establishment culture of loyalism; conversely, Irish and Scottish Catholics were reflexively critical of both. When the Australian government tried to introduce conscription it was defeated, on two occasions by referendum. Prominent Irish Catholic campaigners against the war and conscription such as Archbishop Daniel Mannix were widely denounced in public as traitors by Protestants.

=== International law ===
In 2003, Pope John Paul II became a prominent critic of the 2003 US-led invasion of Iraq. He sent his "Peace Minister", Cardinal Pio Laghi, to talk with US President George W. Bush to express opposition to the war. John Paul II said that it was up to the United Nations to solve the international conflict through diplomacy and that a unilateral aggression is a crime against peace and a violation of international law.

== Communism ==
Pope John Paul II offered support to the Polish Solidarity movement. Soviet leader Mikhail Gorbachev once said the collapse of the Iron Curtain would have been impossible without John Paul II. But Catholic attitudes toward communism have evolved and Pope Francis has taken the focus off ideologies and placed it on the sufferings of people under both systems, with the hope-filled conclusion.

== See also ==
- Caesaropapism
- Category:Catholic political parties
- Estates of the realm
- Gallicanism
- Guelph
- History of the Roman Catholic Church
- Missi dominici
- Separation of church and state
- Theocracy
- Weiblingen
- Integralism § Catholic integralism
