= Throne and altar =

Throne and altar can refer to

- The ideology of Joseph de Maistre
- Monarchism in France
- Relations between the Catholic Church and the state
