= Vincent Reynouard =

French Holocaust denier (born 1969)

- Born: 18 February 1969 (age 57); Boulogne-Billancourt, France
- Occupations: Author, vlogger
- Known for: Holocaust denial and investigation of the Oradour-sur-Glane massacre
- Criminal charges: Convicted for Holocaust denial

Vincent Reynouard (born 18 February 1969) is a French Holocaust denier and proponent of neo-Nazism. He has been convicted and jailed in France under the Gayssot Act, which bars Holocaust denial.

== Biography ==
Vincent Reynouard was, according to his own writings, attracted by National Socialism at the beginning of his teenage years: "Around 14 years old, I was able to study photos of the Third Reich. I rapidly understood that true socialism, the kind I aspired to, had been realized by Adolf Hitler". A student at the ISMRA in Caen in the early '90s, he created the "Normandy Association for the Awakening of the Citizen" (Association normande pour l’éveil du citoyen), which distributed a bulletin named "New Vision" (Nouvelle vision), co-authoring it with Rémi Pontier. In it, he declared being part of the "post-revisionist" Holocaust denial movement derived from Robert Faurisson, Alain Guionnet, and Olivier Mathieu, aiming not only to denounce, what he sees as the "myth of the Shoah", but also the "Jewish control" over the modern world. Reynouard was expelled for some time from his university campus for distributing pamphlets and stickers. He also had an active role in the French and European Nationalist Party in which he was briefly the Secretary General in 1991.

== Holocaust denial activities and criminal convictions ==
In 1991, Reynouard was convicted of distributing Holocaust denial literature. Reynouard had given high school students materials "questioning the existence of the gas chambers". He was tried along with Remi Pontier, the first two people convicted under the Act. Both were members of the neo-Nazi French and European Nationalist Party. Although convicted, he was permitted to continue teaching mathematics at a Honfleur, Normandy high school until 1997, when he was suspended after he was "found to be using the school computer to file documents denying the Holocaust and the fax machine to send the writings to his followers" and "giving his students statistical equations regarding the rate of mortality in Nazi concentration camps".

In the fall of 2000, Reynouard affiliated himself with the Vrij Historisch Onderzoek, a Belgian Holocaust denial and Nazi-sympathizer group. At the time, Reynouard was being investigated by French authorities, and he had chosen to go into exile in Belgium, where he took up residence with a Catholic fundamentalist group in Ixelles, Brussels with close ties to the Society of Saint Pius X. Reynouard ran the group's French-language operations.

In 2004, Reynouard was convicted by a French court of crimes under the 1990 Gayssot Act for distributing a pamphlet and videocassette that questioned the Oradour-sur-Glane massacre, in which many French villagers were killed. He was sentenced to 24 months in prison, of which 18 months were suspended.

In 2005, Reynouard mailed a 16-page pamphlet entitled "Holocaust? What Is Being Hidden from You" to chambers of commerce, museums, and town halls across France. The pamphlet claimed that the Holocaust was "propaganda". As a result, in 2007 Reynouard was sentenced to one year in prison and fined €10,000.

In November 2015, Reynouard was tried before a Normandy court for Holocaust denial in Facebook posts. Reynouard, who chose to represent himself at trial, was sentenced to two years in jail; the sentence was enhanced due to Reynouard's prior convictions.

In November 2022, Reynouard was arrested in Scotland, having fled France in an attempt to evade two separate terms of imprisonment, handed down by the French authorities in November 2020 and January 2021 respectively. At the time of his arrest, Reynouard was living under a false identity in Anstruther, where he had reportedly been working as a private tutor. He was extradited from Scotland to France to face charges there. He received an eight-month prison sentence in September 2026.

== Bibliography ==
- Chombart de Lauwe, Marie José (2006). Réhabilitations du nazisme: attention danger! (in French) (2nd ed.). Paris: Fédération nationale des déportés et internés, résistants et patriotes. ISBN 978-2-905697-26-4.
- Reynouard, Vincent (1997). Le Massacre d'Oradour. Un demi-siecle de mise en scène (PDF). V.H.O. Vrij Historisch Onderzoek a.s.b.l. - A.N.E.C. ISBN 9073111218.
