= Parti Communautaire Européen =

Political party in Belgium, 1965–1984

The Parti Communautaire Européen (French pronunciation: [paʁti kɔmynotɛʁ øʁɔpeɛ̃], PCE；European Community Party) was a pan-European nationalist political party based in Belgium that had a platform similar to National Bolshevism.

The party was initially formed in 1965 by Jean-François Thiriart as a political group to work alongside his Europe-wide movement Jeune Europe. However the PCE did not gain much attention until the 1970s, when, Thiriart managed to engineer a split in the Communist Party of Belgium (PCB) gain a new core of membership for the CPE.

Despite this, the PCE gradually declined in importance, particularly as Thiriart came to spend less time in Belgium. Many supporters of the PCE moved on to the Front National in the early 1980s as the group largely disappeared. The group was finally put to rest in 1984 with the foundation of the Parti Communautaire National-Européen, a group with similar ideas that Thiriart agreed to serve as advisor to.
