= Parti Communautaire National-Européen =

National-European Communitarian Party Parti Communautaire National-Européen
- Leader: Luc Michel
- Founded: 1984
- Headquarters: 128 Montigny Street, Box 01, B-6000 Charleroi, Belgium
- Ideology: National Bolshevism; Pan-Europeanism
- Political position: Syncretic
- Colours: Red

Website
- pcn-ncp.com

The Parti Communautaire National-Européen (French pronunciation: [paʁti kɔmynotɛʁ nasjɔnal øʁɔpeɛ̃], PCN) is a Belgium-based political organisation led by Luc Michel, a former member of the neo-Nazi FANE party. A largely National Bolshevik movement, it also has activists in France.

== History ==
The PCN was founded in 1984 as a successor to the similar Parti Communautaire Européen. The party bases its ideas on those of Jean-François Thiriart (who served as an advisor to Michel for a time after the foundation of the group) and seeks the creation of a single European state stretching entity from Russia to the Atlantic coast. Including activists with origins on both the far-right and far-left, it seeks to liberate Europe from its "Yankee and Zionist enemies". Indeed, Professor Piero Ignazi has defined the group as an heir to Thiriart's early influential organisation Jeune Europe. Its founding membership included both those whose background was neo-fascism and former Maoists. It has also been noted for giving support to controversial world leaders, most notably Iraq's Saddam Hussein and Libya's Muammar al-Gaddafi. It also declared its support for ecologism. According to Eric Rossi, the PCN belongs to a strand of the Francophone far-right that he identifies as "ethno-differentialist revolutionary nationalism" in which he also includes Nouvelle Résistance, Groupe Union Défense, Troisième voie and Groupement de recherche et d'études pour la civilisation européenne. He contrasts this with the "exclusivist nationalists" (as represented by L'Œuvre Française) and the "supremacist racialist nationalists" (Fédération d'action nationale et européenne and Parti nationaliste français et européen), although including all three groups within a wider model of neo-fascism.

The party has from time to time contested elections in Belgium and France (without securing elected office), although at the 2007 Belgian federal election, they told their supporters to vote for the Vlaams Belang and the Rassemblement Wallonie France.

The party is not connected to the European Community Party, a more recent initiative.

Luc Michel, the party's founder, died on April 1, 2025, following a long illness, after several months of hospitalization.
