= Jacques Trémolet de Villers =

French writer and lawyer (born 1944)

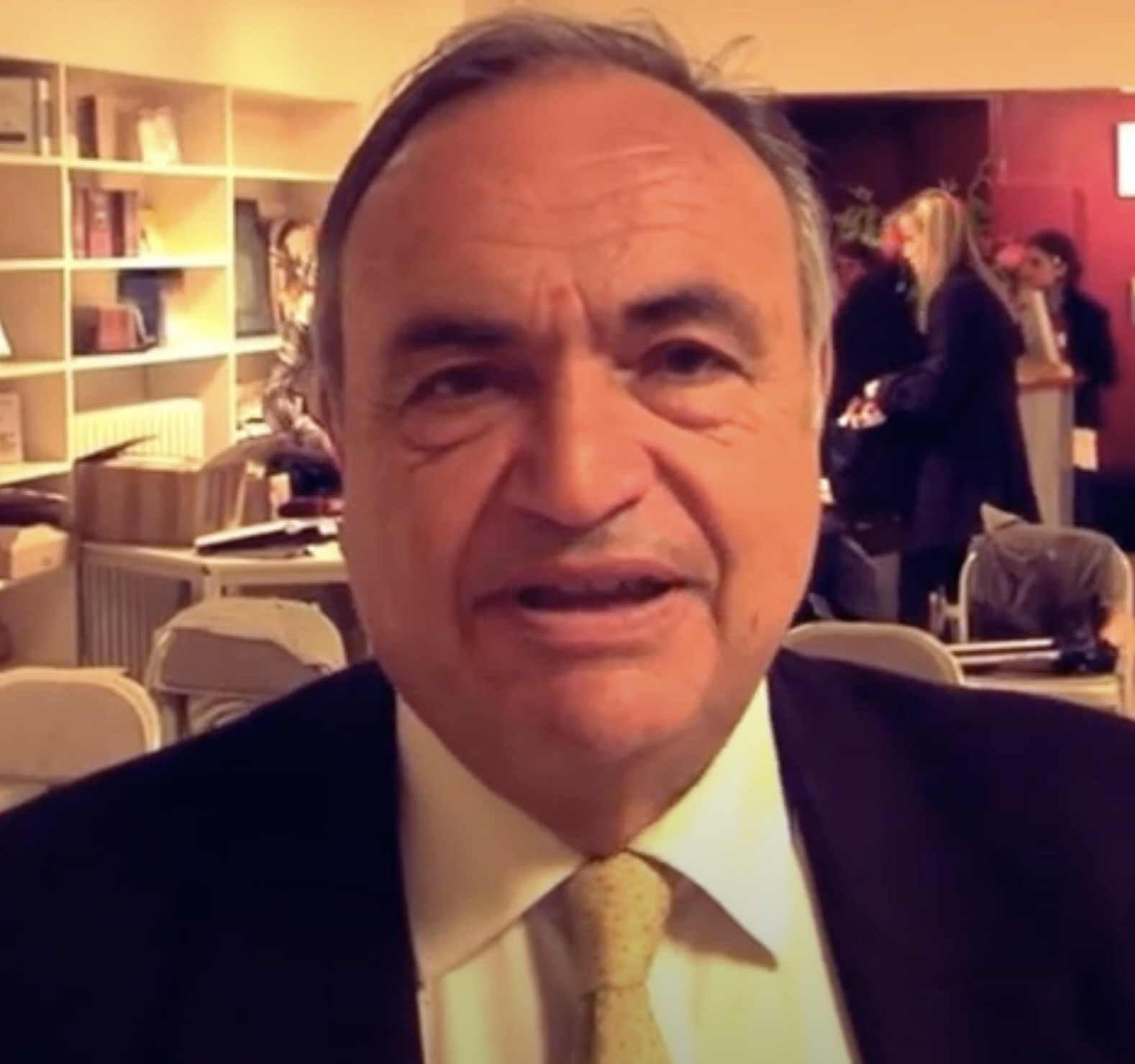
Jacques Trémolet de Villers in 2024

Jacques Trémolet de Villers (born 6 September 1944, Mende, Lozère) is a French writer and lawyer.

== Biography ==
Trémolet de Villers was a collaborator of the politician Jean-Louis Tixier-Vignancour. In 1974 he founded his law practice, where he handled some famous legal matters such as the inheritance issues of Émilien Amaury, the founder of the media group Amaury-Le Parisien. He also handled the affair of Philippe de Dieuleveult's disappearance, the defense of Jean-Charles Marchiani, former prefect of Var, as well as that of the mayor Pierre Bernard and that of the war criminal Paul Touvier.

He is also a member of the Cercle de l'Oeillet blanc, headed for a long time by Guy Coutant de Saisseval, and of the association Gens de France. Trémolet de Villers also supports Jean of Orléans, the monarchist candidate to the French throne.

== Publications ==
- Défendre l'homme : Le message social de Jean-Paul II à la France, CLC, 1980
- Paul Touvier est innocent, Dominique Martin Morin, 1990 ISBN 978-2-85652-130-4
- Immigration et nationalité : quelles réponses ? (dir.), Dominique Martin Morin, 1991 ISBN 978-2-85652-114-4
- L'affaire Touvier: Chronique d'un procès en idéologie, Dominique Martin Morin, 1994 ISBN 978-2-85652-198-4
- Aux Marches du Palais : Pierre-Antoine Berryer, avocat, Dominique Martin Morin, 1997 ISBN 978-2-85652-223-3
- Heureux qui comme Ulysse et vingt-quatre autres poèmes que nous devrions savoir par cœur pour les dire à nos enfants, Dominique Martin Morin, 1998 ISBN 978-2-85652-236-3|978-2856522400
- Lettres d'ailleurs au Prince qui vient, Dominique Martin Morin, 1999 ISBN 978-2-85652-248-6
- Les Fleurs d'Ulysse, Dominique Martin Morin, 2000 ISBN 978-2-85652-214-1
- Paroles de Rois, Dominique Martin Morin, 2001 ISBN 978-2-85652-268-4
- Le rêve de Jules Lebridour : Neuf contes de notre temps, Dominique Martin Morin, 2007 ISBN 978-2-85652-305-6
- Regards : 2006-2007, Editions de Paris, 2008 ISBN 978-2-85162-225-9 "Regards : 2006 - 2007". Archived from the original on 2011-07-10.
