= Cité catholique =

Traditionalist Catholic organisation

The Cité Catholique is a Traditionalist Catholic organisation created in 1946 by Jean Ousset, originally a follower of Charles Maurras (founder of the monarchist Action Française in 1899) and Jean Masson (1910–1965), not to be confused (as F. Venner did) with Jacques Desoubrie, who also used the pseudonym Jean Masson. Despite the presence of Roman Catholic clergy in some of its meetings, the Cité catholique is not officially recognised by the Roman Catholic Church.

It first took the name of Œuvres de la Cité Catholique (Works of the Catholic City) and then of Office international des œuvres de formation civique et d'action culturelle selon le droit naturel et chrétien (ICTUS, International Office of Works of Civic Formation and Cultural Action According to Natural Christian Law) before being known under the name Cité Catholique. It is now presided by Jacques Trémollet de Villers, a former associate of the far-right politician Jean-Louis Tixier-Vignancour and former defence attorney for accused war criminal Paul Touvier. The Cité catholique also helped found in 1971 the pro-life NGO Laissez-les-vivre. Jean-Paul Bolufer, a former alumnus of the ENA and who was the chief of staff of Christine Boutin, Minister of Housing and the City, before being forced to resign, and close to the Opus Dei, was trained by Cité catholique.

== History ==
An advance party of the Cité catholique arrived in Argentina in 1958, in the middle of the Algerian War (1954–62) and after the military deposed Juan Perón in 1955. The Cité Catholique brought to Argentina a doctrine of counter-revolutionary warfare and repression against terrorism, justified as part of Thomist. They would thus provide the ideological support of the future "Dirty War" carried out by the Argentine military in the 1970s.

Many members of the group had taken part in the pro-"French Algeria" OAS terrorist group created in Madrid, which attempted to block the implementation of the March 1962 Évian Accords and also tried several times to assassinate General Charles de Gaulle, whom the French far-right felt had deceived them. Following the dismantlement of the OAS and execution of some of its members, the OAS chaplain, Fr. Georges Grasset, organised the flight of OAS members, from a route going from Paris to Franquist Spain and finally to Argentina. Grasset arrived in 1962 in Buenos Aires to take charge of the Argentine branch of the Cité Catholique.

Charles Lacheroy, a member of this group, was the first person to reflect on the reasons behind the 1954 French defeat at Dien Bien Phu, which all but put an end to the Indochina War (1946–54). Roger Trinquier, who theorised the systemic use of torture in counter-insurgency in Modern Warfare: A French View of Counterinsurgency (1961), was also a member of this organisation.

Along with Colonel Jean Gardes, chief French expert in psychological warfare, Jean Ousset developed the concept of "subversion". According to Argentine journalist Horacio Verbitsky, "this conceived a protean, quintessential enemy who, rather than being defined by his actions, was seen as a force trying to subvert Christian order, natural law or the Creator's plan." According to Ousset, "the revolutionary apparatus is ideological before it is political, and political before it is military."

== Le Marxisme-Léninisme ==
In Le Marxisme-Léninisme, Jean Ousset wrote that Marxists could be combatted only by "a profound faith, an unlimited obedience to the Holy Father, and a thorough knowledge of the Church's doctrines." The first translated version of this book was in Spanish, published in Argentina in 1961 and for which Antonio Caggiano, Archbishop of Buenos Aires from 1959 to 1965, wrote a prologue, where he thanked the "men of La Ciudad Católica of Argentina." In this prologue, Caggiano explained that Marxism was born of "the negation of Christ and his Church put into practice by the Revolution" and spoke of a Marxist conspiracy to take over the world, for which it was necessary to "prepare for the decisive battle," although the enemy had not yet "taken up arms." The Argentine journalist Horacio Verbitsky commented this: "As often happens in a continent that imports ideas, the doctrine of annihilation preceded that of the revolutionary uprising." Caggiano compared this vigilance to the one that preceded the 1571 Battle of Lepanto "to save Europe from domination by the Turks." Ousset's book also included a list of the papal bulls condemning communism.

Colonel Jean Gardes arrived in Argentina in 1963. Her daughter showed in 2003 to French journalist Marie-Monique Robin notes from her father, which show that in March 1963, a naval lieutenant commander, Federico Lucas Roussillon, offered Gardes Argentine government protection if he would deliver counter-insurgency courses at the ESMA, the Navy Mechanic Schools. In 1955, then Lieutenant Roussillon took part in the Revolución Libertadora, the Catholic nationalist movement led by Eduardo Lonardi which overthrew Juan Domingo Perón. Major Juan Francisco Guevara, one of Lonardi's general staff, proposed that the conspirational password be "God is Just." Roussillon became in 1963 a member of the Naval intelligence service, and retired in 1979 with the rank of captain. Soon after Gardes met Roussillon, the Cadets at the ESMA were shown the film The Battle of Algiers, which described one of the first counter-insurgency battles, during which General Marcel Bigeard and Jacques Massu made a systemic use of torture, the block warden system, and death flights (dubbed "Crevettes Bigeard", or "Bigeard's Shrimps").

== Bibliography and sources ==
- Horacio Verbitsky in The Silence, extract transl. in English made available by openDemocracy: Breaking the silence: the Catholic Church in Argentina and the "dirty war", July 28, 2005
- Marie-Monique Robin, Escadrons de la mort, l'école française, 453 pages. La Découverte (15 Sep 2004). Collection : Cahiers libres. (ISBN 2707141631) Transl. Los Escuadrones De La Muerte/ the Death Squadron 539 pages. Sudamericana (Oct 2005). (ISBN 950072684X) (Presentation and La Escuela Francesa, escuadrones de la muerte (French, English, Spanish — Spanish subtitles), broadcast on Mefeedia)
- F. Venner, Extrême France, Grasset, 2006
