= Paul Vigouroux =

French political activist (1919–1980)

Paul Vigouroux (1919–1980), also known as Mathieu Laurier, was a French political activist and anti-communist. He was a member of the Jeunesses Patriotes, La Cagoule, and was secretary general of the Parti français national-collectiviste (PFNC), a political party that was one of the forerunners of the Legion of French Volunteers Against Bolshevism.

After the French Occupation by Germany in 1941, he volunteered to fight against the USSR in the Eastern Front with the Legion of French Volunteers. In 1942 he joined Franc-Garde, the armed wing of the paramilitary force Milice. He also edited Au Pilori, an antisemitic newspaper.

After the Liberation of France he fled to Venezuela, where he wrote his memoirs under the pseudonym Mathieu Laurier.
