= 1988 Cannes and Nice attacks =

Anti-immigrant attack

- Location: Cannes and Nice, France
- Date: May 9 – December 19, 1988
- Target: French Muslim immigrants
- Attack type: Terrorist bombings
- Deaths: 1
- Injuries: 16
- Perpetrator: French and European Nationalist Party
- Motive: Islamophobia, antisemitism, and anti-immigrant sentiment

The 1988 Cannes and Nice attacks were two bombings carried out by neo-Nazis posing as Jewish extremists, targeting Sonacotra immigrant hostels. One person was killed and sixteen others were injured.

== Attacks ==
On 9 May 1988, a Sonacotra hostel in Cannes that was frequented by North African immigrants was bombed with a gas bottle, injuring four people.

On December 19 of the same year, two firebombs exploded in a hostel for North African immigrant workers in Cagnes-sur-Mer, a suburb of Nice. In the subsequent panic as tenants evacuated, a third bomb exploded near one of the building's exits. The attack injured twelve people and killed one. Although police spokesmen reported that most of the residents in the building in Cagnes-sur-Mer were Tunisian, the lone fatality was George Iordachescu, a Romanian exile.

== Perpetrator ==
In an attempt to frame Jewish extremists for the Cagnes-sur-Mer bombing, the terrorists left anti-Muslim leaflets bearing Stars of David and calling themselves the Masada Action and Defense Movement (French: Mouvement d'Action et Défense Massada). It also contained the message "To destroy Israel, Islam has chosen the sword. For this choice, Islam will perish."

The Zionist moniker turned out to be a false flag, and in January 1989, 18 members of the neo-Nazi French and European Nationalist Party (PFNE) were arrested for the bombings, which had been intended to provoke tensions between Arabs and Jews in France. They were also suspected of another bombing attack in Paris against the offices of the Le Globe newspaper on 31 July 1988.

Four police officers from the Fédération professionnelle indépendante de la police (FPIP) union, Patrick Reynes, Daniel Lenoir, Philippe Caplain and Daniel Sirizzotti, were also charged with criminal conspiracy in 1990. They were also thought to have been members of the PNFE.

In 1991, Nicolas Gouge was sentenced to 18 years in prison, and his accomplices Philippe Lombardo, Georges Cassar and Serge Bayoni, were sentenced to 14, 12 and 8 years in prison respectively. The group's leader Gilbert Hervochon, was acquitted from a prison sentence but was sentenced on 15 October to four years in detention for criminal conspiracy.

== See also ==
- False Flag
