= Mefeedia.com =

MeFeedia.com was a media search website founded in 2004 that featured videos, TV shows, movies, and music among other material. The chief executive officer of MeFeedia was Frank C. Sinton III. Mefeedia's name was derived from how it received all content from user-submitted video RSS feeds from other sites and vlogs.

== Content ==
The main focus of the site was videos, with an emphasis on humorous videos, premium content, and other material targeted towards their male demographic. MeFeedia also had several video categories including TV, movies, sports, celebrity, news and entertainment. MeFeedia posted roughly 30 new videos on the homepage per day, mostly consisting of news clips from around the world. The site also included television clips and other viral videos.

The site did not allow video uploading, but collected videos from over 20,000 other video sites and blogs. Videos could be automatically added to the index by submitting media RSS feeds.

As of March 2009 MeFeedia was one of the top 750 most visited sites in the U.S. reaching a global monthly audience greater than 6.8 million uniques per month.

The website was owned by Beachfront Media, LLC.

== Mainstream media content ==
In 2008, Mefeedia.com partnered with several content producers to expand its video inventory to include:

- Major Video Sharing sites (YouTube, DailyMotion, Metacafe, Blip, Veoh, and many more.
- Web Series Sites (AllorNots, Quarterlife, BoingBoing TV, 60 Frames series, Next New Networks series, etc.)
- Video Blogs (Steve Garfield, Ryan Is Hungry, etc.)
- TV Sites (Hulu, CBS, ABC, and others)
- News Sites (CNN, MSNBC, ABC News, CBS News, etc.)
- Music Sites (Imeem and others)

== See also ==
- Video sharing
