= Mark Fredriksen =

French politician (1936–2011)

Mark Fredriksen (18 November 1936 – 25 August 2011) was a French extreme right figure and the founder, in 1966, of the neo-Nazi Fédération d'action nationaliste et européenne.

== Biography ==
Fredriksen co-edited Notre Europe, which was the mouthpiece of the Revolutionary Nationalist Groups (GNR), a Third Position group headed by François Duprat, who later joined the National Front (FN).

He also stood as a candidate for the National Front (FN) at a time when the party sought out alliances with more radical groups due to the impact on their support that the Parti des forces nouvelles (PFN) was having. Fredriksen was a strong critic of the PFN, arguing that they were just a more militant version of mainstream Gaullism. As such Fredriksen was the FN candidate in Seine-Saint-Denis in the 1978 election where his 1.4% vote share was actually one of the higher results for the far right in an election in which they failed to prosper. Fredriksen left the FN after the murder of François Duprat, feeling that Jean-Marie Le Pen was too 'soft' for his liking.

Fredriksen's controversial opinions made him a target for direct attacks more than once. On 19 September 1980 Fredriksen and a group of his supporters were attacked at the Paris palace of justice by a group of people claiming to represent the Jewish Defense Organization. Fredriksen suffered a further attack on 12 October that year and had to be treated in hospital. In 1981, Frederiksen was sentenced to 18 months in prison, with 12 months suspended, plus 33,000 Francs in fines, for racist remarks and pro-Nazi sentiments in Notre Europe.

He died on 25 August 2011.

== Bibliography ==
- Shields, James G. (2007). The Extreme Right in France: From Pétain to Le Pen. Routledge. ISBN 978-0415372008.
