= Jean Ousset =

French ideologist (1914–1994)

Jean Ousset (28 July 1914 – 20 April 1994) was a French ideologist of National Catholicism born in Porto, Portugal. He was an activist of the Action française monarchist movement in the 1930s, and personal secretary of its leader, Charles Maurras. Under the Vichy regime during World War II, Ousset became the chief of the research bureau of Jeune légion, a structure dependent of the Légion française des combattants, the veterans' association created in 1940 and headed by Xavier Vallat.

Following the Liberation, Jean Ousset became one of the leaders of Cité catholique, an integral Catholic group. The Cité catholique also included Marcel Lefebvre, who later founded the priestly Society of St. Pius X, free from neo-modernist and indifferentist currents. As the Cagoule had done before the war, the Cité catholique had as aim to infiltrate the Republic's elites in order to form a National Catholic state, on the model of Francoist Spain.

Jean Ousset published in 1949 Pour qu'Il règne ("That He may reign"), a title which later chosen by the Belgian section of the Society of St. Pius X as the title of its newspaper. The preface of the book was signed by Marcel Lefebvre.

Ousset also wrote Le Marxisme-Léninisme in which he developed the new concept of "subversion" and argued that Marxists could only be combatted by "a profound faith, an unlimited obedience to the Holy Father, and a thorough knowledge of the Church's doctrines.". Its Spanish translation was prefaced by Antonio Caggiano, the archbishop of Buenos Aires and military chaplain, who would theorize counter-revolutionary warfare in Argentina (theories which were implemented by the military during the so-called "Dirty War").

One of his most significant works (the only one translated into English), Action is a handbook designed as a practical implementation of the Social Teachings of the Catholic Church in alignment with the papal encyclicals that call for a re-establishment the Social Kingship of Christ. The work provides a structured approach to social involvement and response to anti-Catholic movements. The English translation of Action was introduced by Anthony Fraser, son of Hamish Fraser the noted founder of the journal Approaches, convert to Catholicism from atheistic Communism and the producer of the English translation of this work.

== Works ==
- Histoire et génie de la France (1943)
- Fondement d’une doctrine (1944)
- Pour qu'Il règne (1949)
- Action (~1959)
- To Fly from the Cross: A History of Dark Disorder in the Catholic Church
