= Luc Michel =

Belgian political activist (1958–2025)

- Born: 14 January 1958
- Died: 1 April 2025 (aged 67)
- Occupations: Politician, activist

Luc Michel (14 January 1958 – 1 April 2025) was a Belgian political activist. He was the leader and founder of the Parti Communautaire National-Européen (PCN). According to research by the BBC and Logically, he was also behind Russosphere, a French-language African social network and fake news network spreading pro-Russian and anti-Western propaganda in Africa. He was also nicknamed the "white Pan-Africanist". He was an advisor to Pierre Nkurunziza in Burundi.

== Early life ==
Luc Michel was born on 14 January 1958, and hailed from Charleroi. In his youth, Michel was a member of Front de la Jeunesse, a private militia group on the extreme right.

== Career ==
Michel first came to prominence when he served as Thiriart's personal secretary. Inspired by the success of Jean-Marie LePen in France, Michel attempted to establish a group using the National Front name in 1984, but this proved unsuccessful. A more long-lasting Belgian National Front was established by Daniel Féret the following year, although Michel took no role in this group due to a strong personal antipathy towards Féret.

He established the PCN in 1984, following the failure of his National Front initiative. Michel has been leader since its foundation, although following the collapse of the Soviet Union he convinced his mentor Thiriart to become a member. Thiriart died soon afterwards.

In 2014, Michel and Jean-Pierre Vandersmissen, as representatives of a group called the Eurasian Observatory for Democracy and Elections, acted as observers of the Crimean status referendum.

Luc Michel worked for "Afrique Media TV", Luc Michel presented himself as a "geopolitics expert" during interviews on African media and wrote "analyses" which also appeared on African television channels and Afrique media.

=== Pro-Russian propaganda campaigns ===
In early 2023, the BBC and Logically identified Michel as the creator of Russosphere, a French-language social media campaign that pushes pro-Russian propaganda in Africa. Russosphere first emerged in mid-2021, but was fully launched in February 2022, prior to the Russian invasion of Ukraine. It amassed over 65,000 followers on social media platforms such as Facebook, YouTube and Twitter, as well as Telegram and VK. The network's posts typically accuse France of modern-day "colonialism", describe the Ukrainian army as "Nazis" and "Satanists", and praise the Wagner Group, a Russian private military company. Logically researcher Kyle Walter said that Russosphere relied on legitimate grievances African countries have with France and Belgium to promote Russia as a better alternative.

Logically also identified Michel as being involved in the "Republic of Detroit" movement, a campaign to create a breakaway republic in the United States. Walter said that while the movement was a "weird sideshow" without much impact or influence, its message echoed that of Russosphere, and described it as Russia's "firehose model" of propaganda.

== Death ==
Michel died following a long illness on 1 April 2025, at the age of 67. He had been hospitalized for several months.

== Ideology ==
Michel was a supporter of National Bolshevism and described himself as a "national communist". He created a number of periodicals that stressed opposition to Zionism and the United States. He was a lawyer by profession, he also wrote extensively on his political ideas. He claimed to have the support of Gennady Zyuganov, leader of the Communist Party of the Russian Federation, in this endeavour.

He advocated the idea of a "Eurasian axis" between China, Russia, and Iran as an alternative to Western hegemony, and called for an international tribunal in China to prosecute colonial crimes.

In his writing Michel expressed admiration for several developing world figures, including Che Guevara, Juan Peron, Saddam Hussein and Muammar Gaddafi. His attraction to the latter led him to establish the Mouvement Européen pour la Démocratie Directe, a think tank inspired by the Third International Theory. Michel established contact with the Libyan regime and in August 2003 organised with their help the quatrieme universite d'ete pour les mouvements verts, pacifistes et alternatifs en Europe as an attempt to encourage co-operation between elements of the far right and the far left.

Michel had links with several members of Vlaams Belang, including Frank Creyelman.

== Publications ==
- Le Parti Historique Révolutionnaire
- Orientations NR
- Manifeste à la Nation-Europe
- Pour une Europe unitaire et communautaire
- Mythes et réalités du national-bolchévisme (Russie, Allemagne, Europe)
- La résistance allemande anti-hitlérienne
- Moammar Kadhafi et la révolution lybienne
