= French and European Nationalist Party =

French neo-Nazi organization

French and European Nationalist Party Parti Nationaliste Français et Européen (PNFE)
- Founded: 1987; 39 years ago
- Dissolved: 1999
- Split from: French Nationalist Party
- Newspaper: Tribune nationaliste
- Membership: 1000
- Ideology: White supremacism Ultranationalism; Neo-Nazism; Antisemitism; Anti-immigration
- Political position: Far-right

Party flag

The French and European Nationalist Party (French: Parti nationaliste français et européen or PNFE) was a French nationalist militant organization active between 1987 and 1999. Led by Claude Cornilleau until 1996, its slogan was "France first, white always" (France d'abord, blanche toujours). It had around a thousand sympathizers at its height.

== History ==
The organization emerged in June 1985 as a splinter group of the French Nationalist Party, and was officially announced in 1987 at Euroring, a European neo-Nazi conference, as Parti Nationaliste Français et Européen (PNFE).

The PNFE was made up of a mixture of former members of the outlawed FANE, and of neo-Nazi hardliners who had been expelled from the Front National (FN) when Jean-Marie Le Pen took on a respectable image after winning a few parliamentary seats in the 1986 elections. The PNFE quickly managed to establish various sections outside of Paris. It had a national publication, Tribune nationaliste, established in October 1985, and edited a magazine in each region: Charlemagne in the Nord-Pas-de-Calais, Le Chêne in Seine-et-Marne, or Le Glaive in Paris.

In July 1989, the head of the Nord-Pas-de-Calais section and editor-in-chief of Charlemagne, Jean Beaussart, was assassinated by his daughter after years of abuse. Beaussart regularly beat and humiliated his daughters, forcing them each morning to perform the Nazi salute in front of a portrait of Adolf Hitler, whom he had made them believe was their uncle. Ida Beaussart was eventually acquitted by the court.

The PNFE had a large Nazi Skinhead following and has been blamed for a number of attacks on immigrants including the 1988 Sonacotra attack against immigrant workers' hostel in Nice for which 18 members were convicted in 1989. Amongst those initially held was Serge Lecanu, who had led the Fédération professionnelle indépendante de la police (FPIP), a far right police trade union. In 1990, Michel Lajoye, a PNFE member since 1988, received a life sentence for dropping a bomb in a café owned by Arab immigrants.

On 10 May 1990, a Jewish cemetery at Carpentras was desecrated, leading to public uproar and a protest demonstration in Paris, attended by 200,000 persons, including French President François Mitterrand. After several years of investigation, five people, among them three former members of the PFNE, confessed on 2 August 1996. On 5 June 1990, the PNFE magazine Tribune nationaliste was banned by the French authorities.

French Holocaust denier Vincent Reynouard was a member of the PFNE and became briefly its secretary general in 1991. In January 1996, Erik Sausset replaced Claude Cornilleau as the president of the organization.

The group was compelled to dissolve in 1999. Erik Sausset later became involved in the Völkisch movement Terre et Peuple. Another cadre of the PNFE, Didier Magnien, later joined Unité Radicale, then migrated to Germany and turned into a member of the Federal Office for the Protection of the Constitution, in charge of the surveillance and repression of neo-Nazi activities. Maxime Brunerie, who attempted to assassinate Jacques Chirac in 2002 had been a member of the group between June and November 1998, leaving what he deemed to be an "agonizing party" to join instead the Groupe Union Défense, renamed Unité Radicale early that year.

== Ideology ==
The movement sought to establish a "New Order" and dismissed the FN as a "so-called nationalist" party integrated to the system. Overtly racist, the group compared black people with animals and the hatred of Jews is omnipresent in their writings.

== European contacts ==
The PNFE had strong contacts with the British National Party and Cornilleau was often a speaker at their annual meetings, being a close friend of John Tyndall. They regularly attended international rallies, notably in Belgium, where they cemented their links with the BNP as well as the Vlaamse Militanten Orde.

The group also built up links with the Vlaams Blok and Christian Worch in Germany. In Belgium they also co-operated with Renouveau nationaliste, a minor group established by former members of the Party of New Forces. In 1991, a sister party was established in Switzerland as the Parti Nationaliste Suisse et Européen, later replaced by a Hammerskins branch.
