= Au Pilori =

Au Pilori ("To the Pillory"), also known as Le Pilori ("The Pillory"), was an antisemitic newspaper published in Occupied France during World War II.

The paper first appeared as Le Pilori, before changing its name through an evolution of the editorial team. It was founded in 1938 and by 1940 had become one of the most virulently antisemitic publications. Funded by the Germans, it did not hesitate to campaign against specific individuals, against persons "suspected" of being Jewish, and against professions normally practiced by Jews, for instance dermatologists. Editors of the paper included Lucien Pemjean, Urbain Gohier, Robert-Jullien Courtine, Paul Vigouroux and Paul Riche, the latter being a pseudonym of Jean Mamy. Mamy was condemned to death for treason and executed at the fortress of Montrouge on 29 March 1949.

Throughout the war it was published from 43 rue Monceau, in the 8th arrondissement of Paris. The newspaper should not be confused with the similar Swiss right-wing publication of the same name, created by Georges Oltramare.
