= Filiation Solazaref =

Far-right esoteric movement, 1984–1995

- Formation: 1984
- Founder: Daniel Winter (known as Solazaref)
- Dissolved: 1995
- Type: Far-right esoteric movement
- Headquarters: Château de Teilhède, Puy-de-Dôme, France

Filiation Solazaref was a far-right esoteric movement founded in 1984 by Daniel Winter, known as Solazaref, and based in Teilhède, Puy-de-Dôme. Its doctrine combined alchemy, anti-communism, druidry, royalism, and integralism. The group maintained ties to the National Front (FN) and other far-right currents. Its founder came into conflict with the municipality of Teilhède in the late 1980s. It was dissolved in 1995. It has often been described as a cult.

== History ==
Daniel Winter was born in Strasbourg in the late 1940s. An engineer and physicist, he worked as an executive at Michelin. According to journalist Michael Petkov-Kleiner, who grew up within the movement, Winter met the alchemist Eugène Canseliet in 1982, before adopting the pseudonym "Pierre d'Houches". He formally founded the Filiation Solazaref in 1984 during a pilgrimage to Rocamadour, and subsequently expanded the group into Italy and Belgium through lecture tours. He then left his job and settled as a potter at the château of Teilhède, in Puy-de-Dôme. He was joined there by around 50 followers, including seven families. Winter then took the name Solazaref, composed of three elements: "Sol" for the sun, "Ases" for the god of command, and "Arès" for the god of war.

Two associations served as the movement's legal basis. Les Portes d'or was founded in Nancy in May 1984. The Association pour la promotion des arts industrieux (APPAI) was founded in Nancy in 1986 and drew its income from pottery sales. Several figures running these structures were former officials of Grand Orient de France lodges, expelled from their obedience for proselytizing on behalf of the Filiation. Members of the Filiation were known for travelling on Harley-Davidson motorcycles.

The mayor of Teilhède, Philippe Folléas, became a target of the community after it discovered he had sponsored the candidacy of Pierre Juquin in the 1988 presidential election. The group launched a poster campaign on the walls of the town hall accusing him of responsibility for deaths attributed to the gulags, drawing on negationist theories about the history of Nazism. The mayor of the neighboring commune of Saint-Hilaire, Albert Desnier, a Socialist Party member, reported seeing members of the community training in fatigues and combat boots on land belonging to the commune, without authorization, and organizing war games with live ammunition there. The movement subsequently announced its intention to win control of the Teilhède town hall in the 1989 municipal elections.

In the early 1990s, the movement had around 50 people permanently based in Teilhède and served as a rallying point for a wider group said to number around 250 members in France and a similar number abroad, notably in Belgium and Italy. The Filiation dissolved in 1995.

== Doctrine ==
The movement engaged in alchemical activities, distributed Daniel Winter's esoteric writings, and produced symbolic objects and jewelry. In 1988, Winter, writing under the name Solazaref, published a book titled Les Bûchers du XX^{e} siècle, printed on a small scale in Teilhède. It presented the movement as a project of resistance against Marxism, socialism, and Freemasonry, which it described as closely intertwined. Winter promoted the intensive practice of competitive shooting, which he compared to Zen, and encouraged his followers to take it up. Followers of the movement also invoked royalism, the principles of chivalry, the Celts and their Druids, as well as the traditionalist Catholicism of Mgr Marcel Lefebvre. The movement also held a particular reverence for the Iron Age, and its members wore tattoos with Kabbalistic motifs. Followers observed rules of life resembling those of a monastic order.

== Publications ==
The publishing house Aux amoureux de la science, based in Teilhède, was founded by Dominique Vadot, who also served as the community's printer and editor. It published Solazaref's Les Bûchers du XX^{e} siècle. Gaulois !, subtitled "quarterly of real opposition", was launched in June 1989 under the direction of Dominique Vadot, with Michel Lardennais as editor-in-chief. The publication was devoted to defending the Filiation and attacking its critics, particularly journalists who had investigated the movement.

== Relations with the far right ==
The movement openly supported the National Front and held a stand at the Bleu-Blanc-Rouge Festival and at the National-Hebdo festival in 1991. Accordingly, Gaulois ! reported on FN activities and urged readers to attend its meetings. The movement also distributed the monthly L'Anti-89, presented as the "liaison and defense bulletin of counter-revolutionarys," directed by François Brigneau. At the 24th colloquium of the GRECE in 1991, the Filiation ran a workshop on runes and other symbols. The Filiation Solazaref also drew close to negationist circles and published a lengthy interview with Robert Faurisson across two issues of its quarterly. Gaulois ! further recommended the works of conspiracy theorists Jacques Bordiot and Yann Moncomble, as well as those of Jean Dumont, Marcel De Corte, and Henri Charlier, traditionalist Catholics for whom alchemy was nonetheless considered a diabolical practice.

== Bibliography ==
- Camus, Jean-Yves; Monzat, René (1992). Les Droites nationales et radicales en France: Répertoire critique (in French). Lyon: Presses universitaires de Lyon. ISBN 2-7297-0416-7.
- Petkov-Kleiner, Michaël (2026). Fanatisé: Mon enfance dans une secte d'extrême droite. Documents (in French). Paris: Denoël. ISBN 978-2-207-18458-5.
- Le Tallec, Cyril (2006). Les Sectes politiques: 1965-1995. Questions contemporaines (in French). Paris: Éditions L'Harmattan. ISBN 2-296-00347-8.
- Van Geirt, Jean-Pierre (1997). La France aux cent sectes (in French). Vauvenargues. ISBN 2-7443-0049-7.
