= Compromis nationaliste =

Political concept developed by Charles Maurras

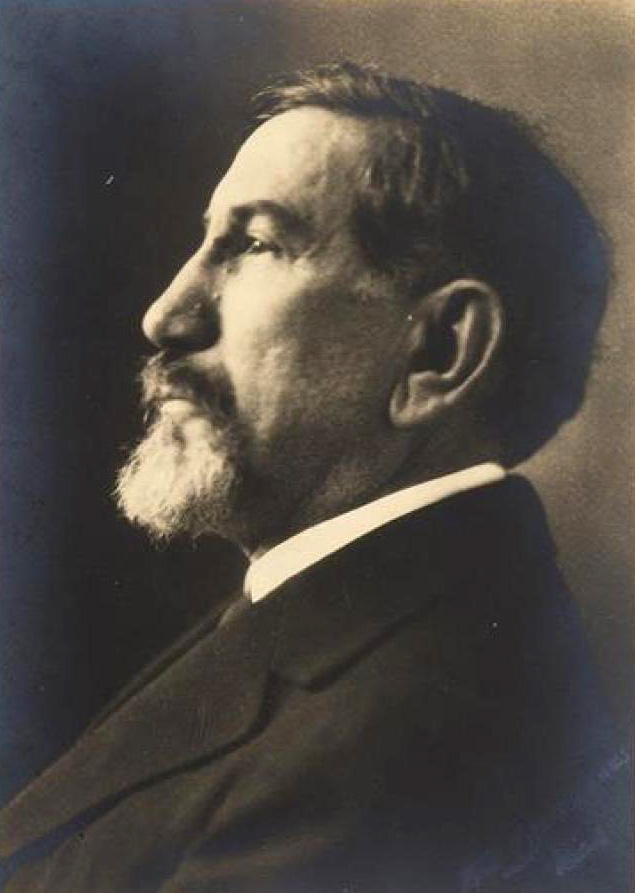
Charles Maurras (1868–1952), author of the concept of the nationalist compromise.

The nationalist compromise is a concept developed by Charles Maurras, referring to a tactical and situational alliance with different currents on specific issues.

== Maurrassian Concept ==
This concept is rooted in the practice of the Maurrassian principle of "politics first". During the period between the defeat of the Republic and the establishment of a monarchy in France, Charles Maurras advocated for French nationalism. In this context, he supported two types of compromises:

[...] one outside the national camp, with conservative republicans, which enabled Léon Daudet to be elected to the Chamber in 1919 with votes from the National Bloc; the other within nationalist factions, which differed on the form of the state, religious issues, and economic matters.

According to Michel Hubault, leader of Chrétienté-Solidarité, the nationalist compromise is based on three conditions: “honesty between parties; agreement on the essentials, namely the safeguarding of the French nation; and, regardless of individual religious convictions, acknowledgment of the essential role Catholicism played in building French civilization”.

Pierre Lafarge noted that Charles Maurras called for an intellectual nationalist compromise in the conclusion of The Future of the Intelligentsia, published in 1905.

Faced with this grim horizon, the national Intelligence must ally with those striving to achieve something beautiful before sinking. In the name of reason and nature, in accordance with the old laws of the universe, for the salvation of order, for the endurance and progress of a threatened civilization, all hopes float aboard the ship of a Counter-Revolution.

During World War I, Charles Maurras temporarily aligned himself with the republican regime under the nationalist compromise to ensure that France remained France. He supported all governments that pursued the war effort.

== At the National Front ==
When the neo-fascist group Ordre Nouveau established the National Front (FN), historian Nicolas Lebourg identified this as a strategy directly inspired by the "Maurrassian nationalist compromise, but in a version redefined by Dominique Venner”, particularly through François Duprat and his Revolutionary Nationalist Manifesto. The revolutionary nationalist strategy aimed to create a unified electoral movement capable of mainstreaming and broadening the dissemination of ideas "beyond the initial fringe circles".

The term is frequently used to emphasize the need to rally patriots. Within the National Front, this concept was employed “to describe the period of gathering diverse groups within the FN from the early 1980s to the 1998 split”.

In 2011, Louis Aliot, appointed Secretary General of the FN in 2005, offered his own interpretation: “The nationalist compromise doesn’t concern the Nazis; it’s about the program”.
