= Ras l'Front =

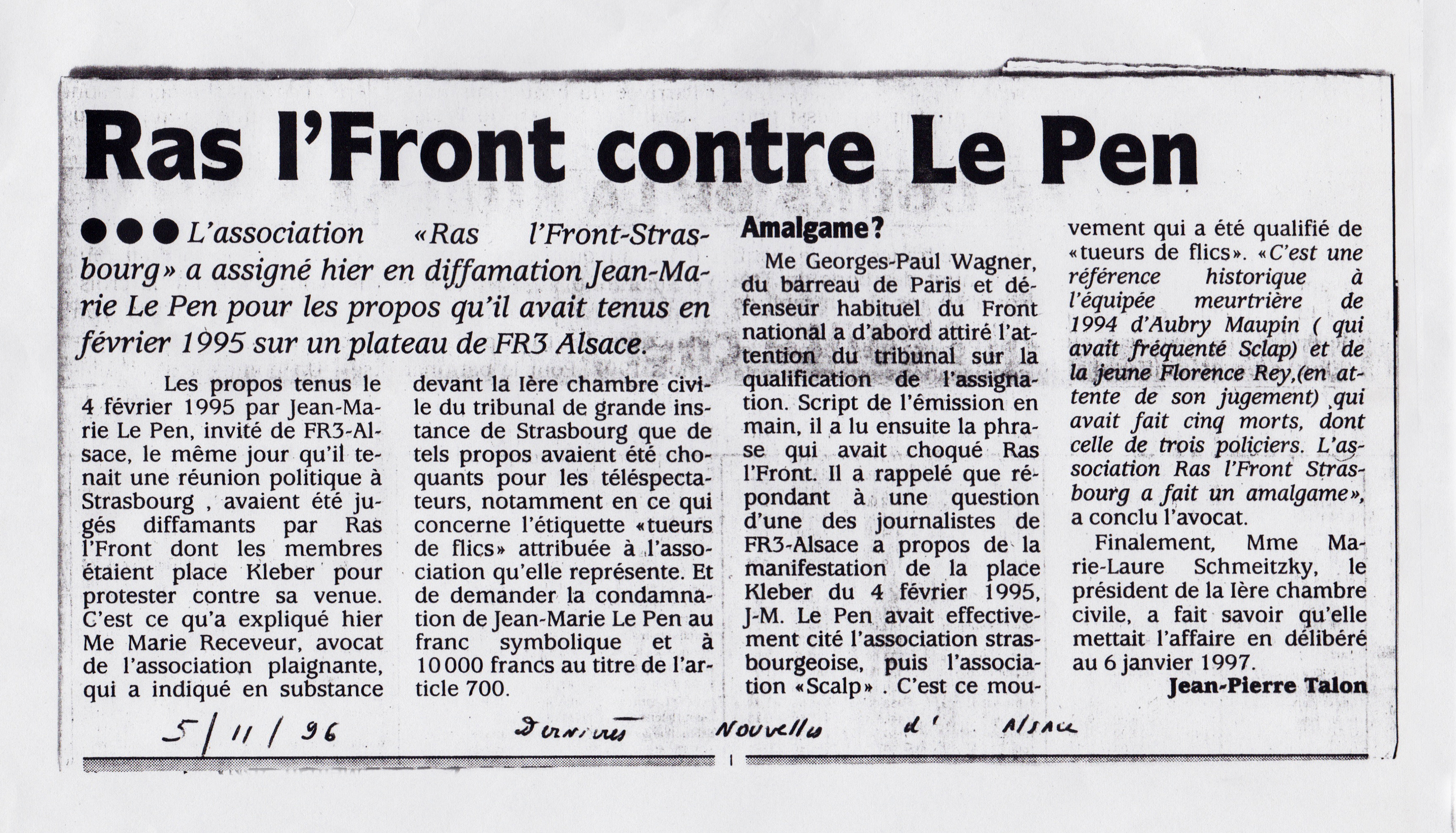
- Press clipping from the Dernières nouvelles d'Alsace, 5 November 1996. The "Ras l'Front-Strasbourg" association sues Jean-Marie Le Pen for defamation.

Ras l'Front (abbreviated as RLF) was a network of associations in France, aligned with the far-left. It was established in 1990 following the "Appeal of the 250" (personalities), aimed at countering the Front National and its ideology.

== Objectives ==
This organization aimed to create and stimulate a "movement of resistance and vigilance" against fascism. It targeted citizens, associations, trade unions, and political parties to combat the Front National, its allies, and other parties deemed to support similar ideologies. The network claims to be independent both politically and financially. It consists of autonomous collectives and operates locally.

Ras l'Front employs various means of action:

- High-profile and media-friendly actions against the Front National and its perceived ideology. A notable example is unfurling a banner from the roof of the Opéra on 1 May 1995, during a speech by Jean-Marie Le Pen to his supporters.
- Public communication through distributing leaflets, selling a bimonthly publication (both on-street and by subscription), pasting posters, and organizing events for the collectives. The publication director for several years was journalist Anne Tristan, a member of the Ligue communiste révolutionnaire (Trotskyist), along with other prominent members of the association.

The association also publishes books exposing the ideas and actions of the Front National and contributes to discussions on ideologies it considers fascist.

== History ==
By the late 1990s the association appeared to have lost most of its militants. However, some collectives reportedly remain active.

In 1997 a stand at the Salon du Livre held by National-Hebdo, a magazine linked to the Front National, was ransacked by individuals claiming association with Ras l'Front.

Far-right journalist Emmanuel Ratier alleged that the movement was Trotskyist-inspired and used the antifascism fight to manipulate youth.

In 2006 "Ras l'Front" found particular resonance within the far-left, especially the Ligue communiste révolutionnaire, from which many militants originated. The network is sometimes classified as far-left.

In 2008 the Ras l'Front network was partially dissolved.

In 2012 "Some Ras l’Front collectives still exist".

== Actions in justice ==
In January 1997 Jean-Marie Le Pen was ordered to pay one symbolic franc to the association for calling it a "movement of cop killers."

In May 2007 Ras l'Front was convicted of public defamation after calling for protests in 2005 against a conference by the Fondation Jérôme-Lejeune.

== Publications ==
- La Résistible ascension du F. Haine, Éditions Syllepse, 1996, 255 pagesISBN 978-2-907993-32-6.
- Petit manuel de combat contre le Front National, Flammarion, 2004, 304 pages,ISBN 978-2-08-068602-2.

== Appendices ==
=== Bibliography ===
- René Monzat, "Ras l'Front, twelve years of atypical activism," Outre-Terre 2/2003 (no. 3), p. 73–88. René, Monzat (June 2003). "Ras l'Front, douze années de militantisme atypique". Outre-Terre. n^{o} 3 (2).
- Carole Boinet (25 June 2013). "From the Streets to the Web: Who Are the Antifa?". Les Inrocks..

=== Related articles ===
- Anne Tristan
- Didier Daeninckx
- Gilles Perrault
- Maurice Rajsfus
- René Monzat
- Section carrément anti-Le Pen

=== External links ===
- Archived website (offline) hosted by Internet Archive, April 2012.
