= Roland Gaucher =

French far-right politician and journalist

Roland Gaucher (French pronunciation: [ʁɔlɑ̃ ɡoʃe]; 13 April 1919 – 27 July 2007) was the pseudonym of Roland Goguillot, a former French far-left activist turned journalist and politician. He then becomes one of the main thinkers of the French far-right, he had participated in Marcel Déat's fascist party Rassemblement National Populaire (RNP) under the Vichy regime. Sentenced to five years of prison for Collaborationism after the war, he then engaged in a career of journalism, while continuing political activism. One of the co-founders of the National Front (FN) in October 1972, he became a Member of the European Parliament (MEP) for the FN in 1986.

== Early career ==
Roland Gaucher entered politics as a far-left activist, first as a member of the Trotskyist group Fédération des étudiants révolutionnaires (Federation of Revolutionary Students) and then of the Jeunesses socialistes ouvrières (Workers' Socialist Youth), where he met with Robert Hersant and Alexandre Hébert, who would become one of the leaders of the social-democrat trade-union Force Ouvrière (FO).

However, Gaucher shifted to the far right during World War II, joining Marcel Déat's Rassemblement National Populaire (RNP) Fascist party in March 1942. He was responsible for the RNP's youth organisation, and for its Parisian section from May to November 1943. He criticized the Vichy regime for being too "moderate" and not executing enough people. At the time of France's Liberation, he was in charge of deleting the archives of the National Populaire 's readers, which was the mouthpiece of the RNP. At the end of 1944, according to Marcel Déat's diary, he fled with Marshal Philippe Pétain's men to the Sigmaringen enclave in Germany.

== Post-war (1945–1980s) ==
Gaucher was sentenced to five years of prison for Collaborationism after the war. After that, he took up a career in journalism, working in Robert Hersant's L'Auto-Journal (Hersant had also been condemned for Collaborationism), Les Ecrits de Paris, Est et Ouest and then as a reporter (grand reporter) for the far-right newspaper Minute from 1965 to 1984.

In the meantime, he joined Georges Albertini's anti-Communist networks through the BEPI and Est and Ouest. He participated in Pierre Poujade's movement. In the middle of the 1950s, he joined Jean-Louis Tixier-Vignancour's Rassemblement national, becoming its secretary general. From 1959 to 1960 he was an employee of the ANFAN (Association National des Français d'Afrique du Nord, National Association of Frenchmen from North Africa), and in 1961 secretary of the AEIPI.

He was one of the co-founders of the National Front (FN) in October 1972, becoming a member of its directing committee. But Gaucher then participated in the split in 1974 leading to the creation of the Parti des forces nouvelles (PFN), gathering radical activists who considered Jean-Marie Le Pen to be too "moderate." There, he contributed to the magazine Initiative nationale. Gaucher was a member of the central committee of the PFN in 1974, and then of the political bureau in 1976. He was the PFN's representative during the Eurodroite meeting in Paris on 28 June 1978, which gathered the Italian MSI, the Spanish Fuerza Nueva and the Belgian Forces Nouvelles along with the PFN for the 1979 European elections. In 1979, he quit the PFN along with François Brigneau to rejoin the FN, at the request of Jean-Pierre Stirbois.

== Career in the FN (1980s–1990s) ==
Roland Gaucher entered the European Parliament in 1986 under the banner of the FN, replacing Dominique Chaboche, and was vice-president of the European delegation for the Association of Southeast Asian Nations (ASEAN). He was also elected as regional counsellor of the Picardy region (1986–1987) and then of the Franche-Comté (1992–1998). He remained an active member of the FN from 1981 to 1993. He successfully sued Le Monde and L'Est Républicain for defamation in 1992, which accused him of being a former Waffen-SS.

He founded in 1984 the FN's weekly National-Hebdo, of which he was chief editor until 1993. He also directed Le Crapouillot, which he owned, from 1991 to 1994.

In 1993, he took his distances with Le Pen's FN, charging it of being too institutional. Revelations by the press on his past also had a role in this decision. Although he stop paying his membership to the FN in August 1994, he remained "apparenté FN" in the Franche-Comté regional council. He got closer at this time to other far-right structures, such as the Militant, led by his friend Jean Castrillo, and Jean-François Touzé's Alliance Populaire (Popular Alliance). He also collaborated articles to the Unité Radicale 's website in 2001–2002, a party close to the Third Position's ideas, and took part to one of its meetings on 22 September 2001. He also wrote a few articles for Christian Bouchet, leader of Unité Radicale, until 2005 and also for Philippe Randa.

Gaucher also signed the call for "national reconciliation" between the FN and Bruno Mégret's National Republican Movement (MNR) in 2001.

Gaucher, who had once declared in one of his books being a member of the National Populist tendency of the FN, maintained links as much with the Lefebvrist Catholics as he did with the "Nationalist Revolutionaries". He was also for a time a member of the patronage committee of Alain de Benoist's GRECE.

== Works ==
- L'Opposition en URSS 1917–1967, Albin Michel, 1967.
- Histoire secrète du Parti communiste français, Albin Michel, 1975.
- Les Terroristes, Famot, 1976.
- Monseigneur Lefebvre, combat pour l'Église, Paris, Éditions Albatros, 1976.
- Les Finances de l'église de France, Albin Michel, 1981.
- Le Réseau Curiel ou la subversion humanitaire, Jean Picollec, 1981.
- Les Nationalistes en France, tome 1 : La Traversée du désert (1945–1983), Publications Roland Gaucher, 1995.
- Les Nationalistes en France, tome 2 : La montée du FN, 1983–1997, Jean Picollec, 1997, 448 p.
- Les Manipulateurs de la culture, Deterna, 1998.
- (in collaboration with Philippe Randa), Les "Antisémites" de gauche, Deterna, 1998.
- (in collaboration with Philippe Randa), Rescapés de l'Épuration tome 1: Tome 1, Le journal de guerre de Marcel Déat Paris : Dualpha, 2002–2004. ISSN 1622-7476
- (in collaboration with Philippe Randa), Rescapés de l'Épuration tome 2: Les réseaux de Georges Albertini Paris : Dualpha, 2002–2004. ISSN 1622-7476

== See also ==
- History of the far-right in France
- Politics of France
