= Jean-Claude Varanne =

Personal details
- Born: Claude Jean Varanne; August 12, 1928 14th arrondissement of Paris
- Died: April 25, 2008 (aged 79) Blennes
- Party: National Centre of Independents and Peasants; Republican Alliance for Freedoms and Progress; National Front (1985–2008)

Jean-Claude Varanne, born on August 12, 1928, in the 14th arrondissement of Paris, and died on April 25, 2008, in Blennes, was a journalist and politician of the far-right in France.

He was the publication director of National-Hebdo from 1993 until his death.

== Biography ==
After World War II, Varanne enlisted in French Indochina with a regiment of Moroccan riflemen. He left the army with the rank of master sergeant and was awarded the Croix de Guerre for Overseas Theatres of Operations (TOE).

He later worked as a sales agent and as the director of an archiving company before becoming a journalist. Initially, he contributed to Valeurs actuelles and Le Spectacle du Monde.

He then joined L'Agefi and was later appointed publication director of Le Crapouillot.

Varanne also presided over the press group SANH (Société Anonyme National-Hebdo) and the National Press Circle.

In politics, he was a member of the political bureau of the Tixier-Vignancour Committees, secretary general of the Republican Alliance for Freedoms and Progress, and a member of the directorate of the National Centre of Independents and Peasants (CNIP). He was an organizer of the Vérités actuelles clubs before joining the National Front (FN) in 1985.

Varanne ran as a candidate for the FN in the Yvelines between 1989 and 1996. He served as a regional councilor for Île-de-France from 1992 to 1998 and later for the Pays de la Loire. He was elected to the municipal council of Mantes-la-Ville in 1995, where he served until March 2008.

In 2004, he became a parliamentary assistant to Marine Le Pen, a member of the European Parliament. In the 2007 legislative election he ran as an FN candidate in the 8th constituency of the Yvelines.

In March 2008, Jean-Claude Varanne led a municipal election list titled "Mantes-la-Ville fait front." His list secured 8.41% of the votes in the first round but did not qualify for the second round.

He died on April 25, 2008, at the age of 79 from a heart attack.
