= Flash (French newspaper) =

2008–2011 French newspaper

- Publisher: Jean-Émile Néaumet
- Editor-in-chief: Nicolas Gauthier
- Ceased publication: September 14, 2011
- Language: French
- Headquarters: Paris

Flash was a biweekly newspaper created in October 2008. The final issue was published on September 14, 2011.

== History ==
The first issue was published on November 2, 2008. Jean-Émile Néaumet served as both the publisher under his real name and the editor-in-chief under his pseudonym Nicolas Gauthier.

While its creators presented it as aligned with alter-globalization, political scientist Jean-Yves Camus questioned this affiliation, stating that

it has already been advocated by some national-revolutionary and far-right circles in Italy and Germany. It mainly critiques globalization as a process of cultural homogenization leading to the eradication of ethnic specificities, as well as a vehement denunciation of American and Israeli domination. This far-right faction also rejects the clash of civilizations theory and does not align with the rabid anti-Muslim sentiment driving another segment of the far right

. Camus concluded that Flash remained "firmly anchored in the far right, but without organic ties to the National Front"

The editorial team included several former contributors to National-Hebdo, such as Béatrice Péreire, cartoonists Ignace and Topoline, and Jean Bourdier.

Other contributors, like Christian Bouchet and Philippe Randa, were known for their far-right affiliations. Regular columns were also written by Alain de Benoist and Pierre Le Vigan.

Alain Soral, a columnist and "editorial advisor", left the newspaper in April 2011, criticizing its close ties to the National Front (FN), a party he had left in 2009.

=== Bankruptcy ===
On September 12, 2011, Flash announced via Gauthier Bouchet, its web strategy manager, that it was "declaring bankruptcy." The final issue, focusing on the September 11 attacks and including an interview with Aymeric Chauprade, had been published four days earlier.
