= Minute (newspaper) =

French newspaper

- Type: Weekly newspaper
- Editor-in-chief: Céline Pascot
- Editor: Jean-Marie Molitor
- Founded: 1962
- Ceased publication: 2020
- Political alignment: Far-right
- Headquarters: Paris
- ISSN: 1243-7751
- OCLC number: 301746229
- Website: www.minute-hebdo.fr

Minute (French: [miˈnyt]) was a weekly newspaper, initially right-wing but later far-right, circulated in France from 1962 to 2020. Its editorial position is satirical and conservative. According to figures provided by the paper's management, it had a circulation of 40,000 copies a week in 2006. Its headquarters is in Paris.

== History ==
=== First decade ===
In 1962, Minute was created by Jean-François Devay, former director of L'Aurore. In its early years, Minute included a large number of articles devoted to show-biz and humorous cartoons. The paper's politics rapidly hardened, particularly following the end of the Algerian War. It became less and less devoted to show-biz news, and became a political newspaper regarded as right-wing but supporting no particular party.

During its heyday (250,000 copies sold per week 1962–1981) the editorial staff were invited to participate every Sunday in Club de la presse, a television and radio show about politics. The tone was very critical of Charles de Gaulle, and the paper had many readers among those disaffected with the Algerian War. Pieces by François Brigneau, who joined the paper in 1963, were noted for their biting anti-Gaullist prose. In 1965 the paper contributed to breaking news of the Ben Barka affair.

The list of shareholder-benefactors of the paper included such names as Fernand Raynaud, Françoise Sagan, Juliette Gréco (a leftist and a supporter of François Mitterrand, only during the paper's initial show-biz focus), Eddie Barclay and Marcel Dassault.

Devay died of cancer in 1971. He was replaced as head of publishing by Jean Boizeau. François Brigneau took on the chief editorship for a time but the extreme political tone with which he infused the paper led to his replacement, and he returned to his position of star editor. During the 1970s the paper adopted a far-right editorial line.

Until 1975 Minute was subject to bomb attacks for three times.

=== Move to the far-right ===
In the second half of the 1970s, Minute adopted a hard-right line marked by its support for the National Front, to whom the newspaper's journalists devoted many articles. Ultimately the party head-hunted Minute's information officer.

At the very beginning of the 1980s, sales of the paper, affected by the support shown to Jean-Marie Le Pen and the loss of investigative reporter such as Jean Montaldo (resigned in 1972), started to decline. Nevertheless Minute retained political influence, and was particularly anti-communist. For example, it helped to publicise the accusations by the daily l'Express against Georges Marchais (the communist leader who, unknown to most French people at the time, had volunteered to work in the Messerschmitt aircraft factory in Germany during the Second World War), and similar charges against Georges Guingouin, former leader of the wartime Maquis du Limousin.

Serge de Beketch, formerly head of information, became chief editor of Minute in 1979. He left the paper in 1986 when Jean-Marie Le Pen chose him to manage National-Hebdo. Among other famous Minute journalists was Patrick Buisson, historian of the Organisation armée secrète and, 30 years later, adviser to Nicolas Sarkozy. Twice, in August 1982 and in April 1985, Minute offices were attacked. An anarcho-communist group called Action Directe claimed responsibility.

In 1987-88 the editorial staff split and formed the rival publications Minute and Le Chardon. Le Chardon would only last a few months before the editorial team reformed under the name Minute-Le Chardon.

In 1990, Serge Martinez, a National Front deputy at the time who later became second-in-command and financier of Bruno Mégret, bought Minute. He transformed the paper into a more news-focussed format and the title became La France, with Minute only appearing as a subtitle or surtitle depending on the issue. He sold the paper three years later as the new formula did not succeed in increasing sales.

That same year (1993), Gérald Penciolelli bought Minute with the intention of turning it back into its original form and abandoning the news focus. Its overall layout was also changed to one that greatly resembled the appearance of Le Canard enchaîné ("The Chained Duck"); it accompanied this change with the slogan "Not all ducks are on the left".

Nicolas Miquet unsuccessfully attempted in February 1999 to purchase Minute, then in financial difficulty. Two months later, Penciolelli's publishing company became insolvent and was dissolved by the Commercial Court (tribunal de commerce). In the issue dated March 1999, the management appealed to its most faithful readers to save the paper. Publication stopped for a few months, during which Miquet launched the paper L'Hebdo, subtitled Le Nouveau Minute. The editorial team, in dispute with Penciolelli, announced its intention to buy back the paper and in the interim published the pastiche Un Faux Minute ("a false Minute"), denouncing the actions of both Penciolelli and Miquet. In December, the Commercial Court assigned the paper to Catherine Barnay, a close associate of Gérard Penciolelli.

In January 2002 Jean-Marie Molitor bought the paper. Molitor has continued to own it ever since.

Minute ended its publication in 2020.

== Later political position ==
In its final years, Minute was a newspaper close to the far-right which styles itself as uniting the souverainist and nationalist right.

Since Minute was not affiliated with a powerful press conglomerate, it was highly dependent on sales revenues. Little by little, Minute has disappeared from certain retail outlets where it had no more than one or two buyers. According to the newspaper, this amounts to a boycott targeting papers with limited circulation. Minute accuses other newspapers of plagiarism (« pillerai[en]t sans citer » lit. "pillaging without citation"). The paper was the first paper to reveal that François Mitterrand had an illegitimate daughter.

Minute has been regularly convicted of defamation, which has led to its inclusion in French Trivial Pursuit as the answer to "Which newspaper can boast the highest number of court proceedings?"

In 1999, the paper refused to take sides in the schism of the National Front between the supporters of Bruno Mégret and Jean-Marie Le Pen. In an editorial published in July 2006, Jean-Marie Molitor made a call for "patriotic unity" between partisans of Jean-Marie Le Pen, Philippe de Villiers and Bruno Mégret. Minute has also repeatedly called for the right wing of the UMP to join the coalition.

During the Kosovo War, Minute supported the Yugoslav government and its president Slobodan Milošević. The first page of the issue circulated on 31 March 1999 was entitled "The Serbs are protecting us against Islamist invasion. Today, Kosovo, tomorrow, France".

Before the 2002 presidential election, Minute published more than 50 conversations with elected members of the RPR, the UDF and the National Front, and organised debates between right-wing and National Front personalities. This led to controversy among certain left-wing personalities, including Julien Dray, who protested at the significant number of deputies from the UMP who had agreed to interviews with Minute.

For the 2006 FIFA World Cup, Minute headlined with "Are there too many blacks in the French team?". In addition, the issue released before the world cup final was titled "Bye-bye hooligan" with a photo of Zinedine Zidane, who had been sent off the field after head-butting an Italian player who had insulted him. The article which followed compared Zidane to a young thug from the banlieue, the rough suburbs.

During the 2007 presidential elections Minute gave its support to the candidature of Jean-Marie Le Pen.

In 2010, Minute supported Bruno Gollnisch in the election for president of the National Front after Jean-Marie Le Pen's retirement. Marine Le Pen, harshly criticised by the paper, was however elected by the congress at Tours on 16 January 2011. Le Canard enchaîné reported that representatives of Minute were denied entry to the congress because of «hostilité illégitime».

The tensions between the party under Marine Le Pen and the newspaper have surfaced regularly, particularly around the debate over marriage equality («mariage pour tous» "marriage for all"). In January 2013, Minute questioned whether there was a gay lobby in the National Front and attacked its vice-president Florian Philippot. In response, Marine Le Pen described Minute as a "rag". Florian Philippot, for his part, described their analysis as "worthy of far-right conspirators from the inter-war period", suggesting "gay" was being used in the same way as "Jew", and accused the daily of "the lowest level of politics".

In June 2013, Minute again courted controversy with the front-page headline « Jeux de mains, jeux de vilains ! », referring to the death of Clément Méric, a far-left antifascist activist, in a brawl with a group of far-right skinheads. This saying is difficult to translate, but is something said to children who are being too rough along the lines of "it'll all end in tears" or "hands are not for hitting" but with a light-hearted, humorous tone.

On 12 November 2013, Minute made its contribution to the ongoing series of racist insults aimed at French Guianan born Attorney-General Christiane Taubira with its front cover headline « Maligne comme un singe, Taubira retrouve la banane » "Crafty monkey, Taubira recovers her banana". Since Taubira championed the passage of France's gay marriage law she has become a target for opponents of the law. The headline refers to one child brought to protest by her parents waving a banana in her face and to her chant: « La guenon, mange ta banane » "Ugly ape, eat your banana!". The previous week National Front candidate Anne-Sophie Leclere had published a picture on Facebook comparing Taubira with a monkey, for which she was expelled from the party. Following this latest controversy, prosecutors have begun investigating Minute for "public insults of a racist nature" at the urging of Prime Minister Jean-Marc Ayrault and the Interior Minister, Manuel Valls is examining whether it is possible to legally prevent distribution of the magazine.

== Prominent contributors ==
These people have written or illustrated for Minute. This list does not contain information about which of the paper's two main eras each person was active in.

- Gérard Angèle;
- François Brigneau;
- Henri Gault and Christian Millau (founders of the Gault & Millau guide);
- Jean-Pax Méfret 1969-1974;
- Philippe Couderc;
- Patrick Buisson;
- Michel Lancelot;
- Jean Montaldo 1964-1972;
- Éric Asudam (Michel-Georges Micberth);
- Alain Fournier, alias Alain Camille or ADG
- Jean-Yves Le Gallou;
- Serge de Beketch;
- Jean Bourdier;
- Roland Gaucher;
- Jacques Tillier;
- Jean-Pierre Cohen;
- René Le Honzec;
- Jean Mabire;
- Philippe Colombani;
- Father Guillaume de Tanoüarn;
- Pierre Marie Gallois;
- Vladimir Volkoff;
- Pinatel;
- Konk;
- Bruno Larebière;
- Jean-Marie Molitor;
- Jérôme Rivière;
- Alain Suguenot;
- Yannick Urrien
- Paule Drouault
