= National-Hebdo =

French political newspaper

- Type: Political journalism nationalist
- Publisher: Jean-Claude Varanne (1984–2008); Louis Aliot (2008)
- Editor-in-chief: Serge de Beketch (1985–1986); Roland Gaucher (1986–1993); Martin Peltier (1993–1998); Jean Bourdier (1998–1999); Yves Daoudal (1999–2008)
- Editor: François Brigneau (until 1998)
- Founded: 1984
- Ceased publication: 2008
- Language: French
- Headquarters: Paris, later Saint-Cloud
- Country: France
- Website: http://www.national-hebdo.net

National-Hebdo was the unofficial weekly newspaper of the National Front (FN). For a long time, its offices were located in Le Paquebot, the headquarters of the political party. Created on 11 May 1984, it filed for bankruptcy on 12 June 2008.

== History ==
The editorial line closely followed the positions advocated by the FN. Initially titled "National Hebdo, the newspaper of Jean-Marie Le Pen," it was later changed to "National Hebdo, the newspaper of the National Front" in September 1985, "National Hebdo, a newspaper for the right" between 1989 and 1990, and "National Hebdo, a weekly for national information" starting in 1991.

== Management ==
The publication directors of National-Hebdo were Jean-Claude Varanne and later Louis Aliot. The last editor-in-chief and editorialist was Yves Daoudal (1999–2008). He succeeded Serge de Beketch (1985–1986), Roland Gaucher (1986–1993), Martin Peltier (1993–1998), and Jean Bourdier (1998–1999). Until 1998, the lead editorialist was François Brigneau, who left following the conflict between Jean-Marie Le Pen and Bruno Mégret.

== Closure ==
Running a deficit of hundreds of thousands of euros in 2008 and struggling with the FN's financial difficulties after poor results in the 2007 French legislative election, National-Hebdo declared bankruptcy in June 2008.

However, the newspaper continued to publish online.

Several former journalists of National-Hebdo later joined the editorial team of the journal Flash, which also included contributors such as Philippe Randa and Alain Soral.

== Publisher ==
National-Hebdo was published by SANH, Société Anonyme National-Hebdo (registration number 344140322), based in Saint-Cloud and managed by Jean-Claude Varanne. The offices were located on Rue Vauguyon, in Le Paquebot, the headquarters of the National Front.

SANH also published books and collections of texts and drawings featured in the weekly.

== Legal Issues ==
On 8 June 1994, the first civil chamber of the Paris tribunal de grande instance ordered National-Hebdo to pay 70,000 francs in damages to Josyane Savigneau and 30,000 francs to Monique Nemer, literary director at Éditions Stock, for defamation. National-Hebdo had repeated accusations made by Jean-Edern Hallier (also convicted) in L'Idiot international.

On 4 April 1996, the 11th chamber of the Paris Court of Appeal convicted Jean-Claude Varanne, director of National-Hebdo, and Martin Peltier for denial of crimes against humanity, fining them 10,000 francs each and ordering them to pay damages to the Union Nationale des Associations de Déportés, Internés et Familles de Disparus (UNADIF), the Fédération Nationale des Déportés et Internés de la Résistance (FNDIR), and the Union Nationale des Déportés, Internés et Victimes de Guerre (UNDIVG). On 29 January 1998, the Court of Cassation dismissed the defendants' appeal.

On the same date, the court convicted Jean-Claude Varanne and contributor François Brigneau for inciting hatred against Jews, fining them 10,000 francs each and ordering them to pay damages to the LICRA and the MRAP. In an article titled "Should I convert?", published in National-Hebdo on 22 September 1994, the court stated that François Brigneau "sought to incite feelings of indignation towards Jews, depicted as arrogant, ungrateful, intolerant, and insular." On 15 January 1998, the Court of Cassation dismissed the defendants' appeal.
