= Party of New Forces =

French far-right political party

Party of New Forces Parti des forces nouvelles
- Founded: November 1974
- Dissolved: 1986
- Split from: National Front; Ordre Nouveau
- Political position: Far-right

The Parti des forces nouvelles (PFN) or Party of New Forces was a French far-right political party formed in November 1974 from the Comité faire front, a group of anti-Jean-Marie Le Pen dissidents who had split from the National Front (FN).

== Development ==
The group included amongst its early members most of the membership of Ordre Nouveau, which had dissolved not long before the formation of the PFN, Alain Robert (the founder of Occident and the Groupe Union Défense or GUD), the academic Pascal Gauchon, the journalists François Brigneau and Roland Gaucher and the draughtsman Jack Marchal. A youth movement, Front de la jeunesse, was formed, although the party was also closely linked to GUD. The ON militants had formed a group called the Faire Front and in September 1973 merged into the Front National, isolating leader Jean-Marie le Pen by taking two-thirds of the seats on the party's national executive. However, in a court case that followed le Pen succeeded in gaining the upper hand, forcing the group to split from his party and establish the PFN as an alternative group in 1975.

Positioned on the far right, the PFN also sought links with the more mainstream right and joined former members of the Organisation armée secrète in campaigning for Valéry Giscard d'Estaing in 1974. The group also launched its own well-produced journal, Initiative nationale, organised protests against the 1977 visit to Paris by Leonid Brezhnev (on the pretext of his support for the Polisario Front, which had taken French hostages) and in 1979 launched the Eurodroite alliance with the Italian Social Movement, Fuerza Nueva and the Belgian PFN. The party ran for the 1979 European elections under the name Union française pour l'Eurodroite (led by Jean-Louis Tixier-Vignancour), winning 1.3% of the vote. They would go on to have members elected to town councils in 1983 as part of the Rally for the Republic (RPR)-Union for French Democracy (UDF) list. Following the 1979 European elections, Roland Gaucher, who had been in charge of Initiative nationale, left the PFN along with François Brigneau to join again the National Front (FN).

The party also endured failure, notably in 1981 when they were unable to secure the 500 signatures necessary to get Pascal Gauchon as a candidate for the presidency. Following this set-back leadership fell into the hands of young members Roland Hélie, Didier Lecerf, Jack Marchal and Olivier Cazal, with former leaders such as Hervé Novelli and Alain Robert leaving to join the National Centre of Independents and Peasants. The party then became involved in anti-communism activities, occupying French Communist Party ministries and joining RPR supporters in breaking up a rally by communist ex-servicemen in a move that provoked scandal for the RPR.

The party itself split in 1986 with a European group known as Parti des forces nationalistes splitting from a tendency rechristened Natrope (Nationalistes européens), which was close to the Nouvelle Droite ideas of Alain de Benoist and GRECE. Although both groups continued for a spell it effectively marked the end of the PFN as any sort of political force.

== Bibliography ==
- Joseph Algazy, L'Extrême droite en France de 1965 à 1984, 1989
