= Ordre Nouveau (1960s) =

Neo-fascist movement in France (1969–1973)

New Order
- Ordre Nouveau
- Leaders: Jean-François Galvaire; François Duprat; François Brigneau
- Founded: 15 December 1969
- Dissolved: 5 October 1972
- Merged into: National Front
- Country: France
- Ideology: Nationalism; Neo-fascism; Nouvelle Droite
- Political position: Far-right

Ordre Nouveau (French: [ɔʁdʁ nuvo]; lit. 'New Order') was a neo-fascist movement created in France on 15 December 1969. Its first president was the lawyer Jean-François Galvaire (who worked for Roland Gaucher, a former member of the National Popular Rally).

After the departure of Galvaire, in May 1970, the new political bureau comprised Emmanuel Allot (François Brigneau), Jacques Charasse, François Duprat, Louis Ecorcheville, Gabriel Jeantet, Claude Joubert, Paul Léandri, Hugues Leclère, Jean-Claude Nourry and Alain Robert. In June 1972, Ordre Nouveau joined with Jean-Marie Le Pen's movement in what would become the National Front. José Bruneau de La Salle joined the political bureau, while Jean-Claude Nourry, Patrice Janeau and Michel Bodin left the movement. On 5 October 1972 the National Front was formed.

On 21 June 1973 militants of Ordre Nouveau attending a meeting titled "Halte à l'immigration sauvage" (stop uncontrolled immigration) at the Maison de la Mutualité clashed violently with those of the Ligue Communiste. This led to the ban of both organisations by the minister of Interior Raymond Marcellin. Some members of Ordre Nouveau (François Brigneau, Gabriel Jeantet, Alain Robert, José Bruneau de la Salle) went on to found the Party of New Forces.
