= Bleu-Blanc-Rouge Festival =

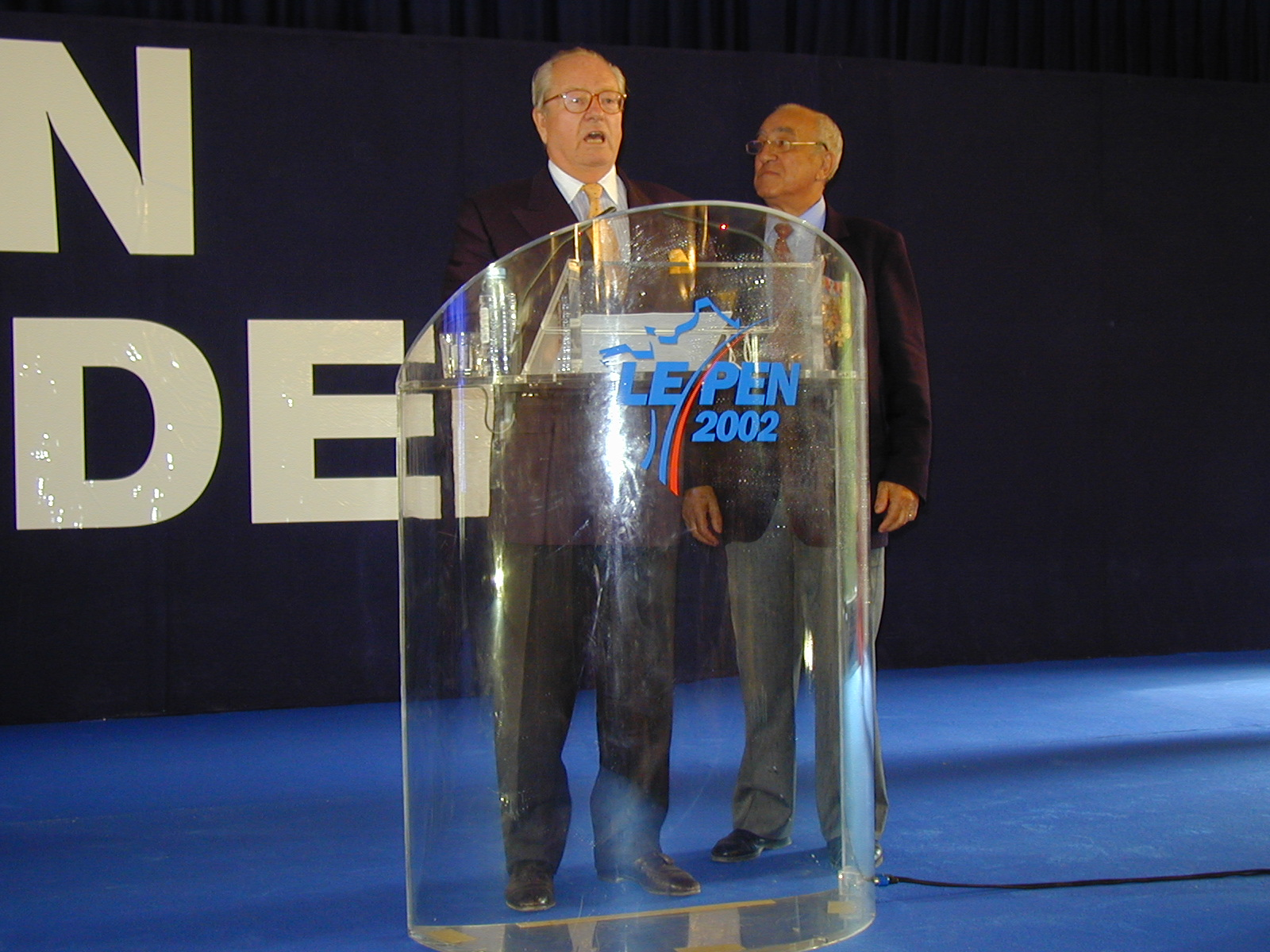
Jean-Marie Le Pen (left), president of the National Front, speaking at the 2001 BBR Festival. He is accompanied by Roger Holeindre, who helped found the party.

The Bleu-Blanc-Rouge Festival (named after the colors of the French flag), commonly referred to as the BBR Festival, was an annual gathering of supporters and members of the National Front. The event was created in 1981 at the initiative of Michel Collinot in reaction to the left's accession to power a few weeks earlier. After 24 editions, with several interruptions, the last edition was held in 2016.

== History ==
=== Creation ===
After his election as President of the Republic in May 1981, François Mitterrand decided to dissolve the National Assembly. The legislative election that followed in June gave him a comfortable majority of Socialist and Communist deputies, and this electoral alliance brought several Communist ministers into the government.

The National Front, for its part, failed to win any seats. The idea then emerged of organizing a festival to make the National Front's image appear more approachable. Conceived as a "counter-festival" to the Communist Party's Fête de l'Humanité, the revenue from ticket sales and merchandise was intended to replenish the National Front's finances after the defeat.

The festival was announced on 2 July 1981 by Michel Collinot on Radio Le Pen, a telephone messaging service, and its first edition took place on 13 September 1981. It subsequently became an annual event.

Depending on the year, the location varied across the Île-de-France region, with a preference for Le Bourget, which hosted the festival six times between 1985 and 1992. From 1993 onward, the event was held in Paris, more precisely in the Bois de Vincennes, on the Reuilly Lawn, in the city's 12th arrondissement.

=== Disappearance ===
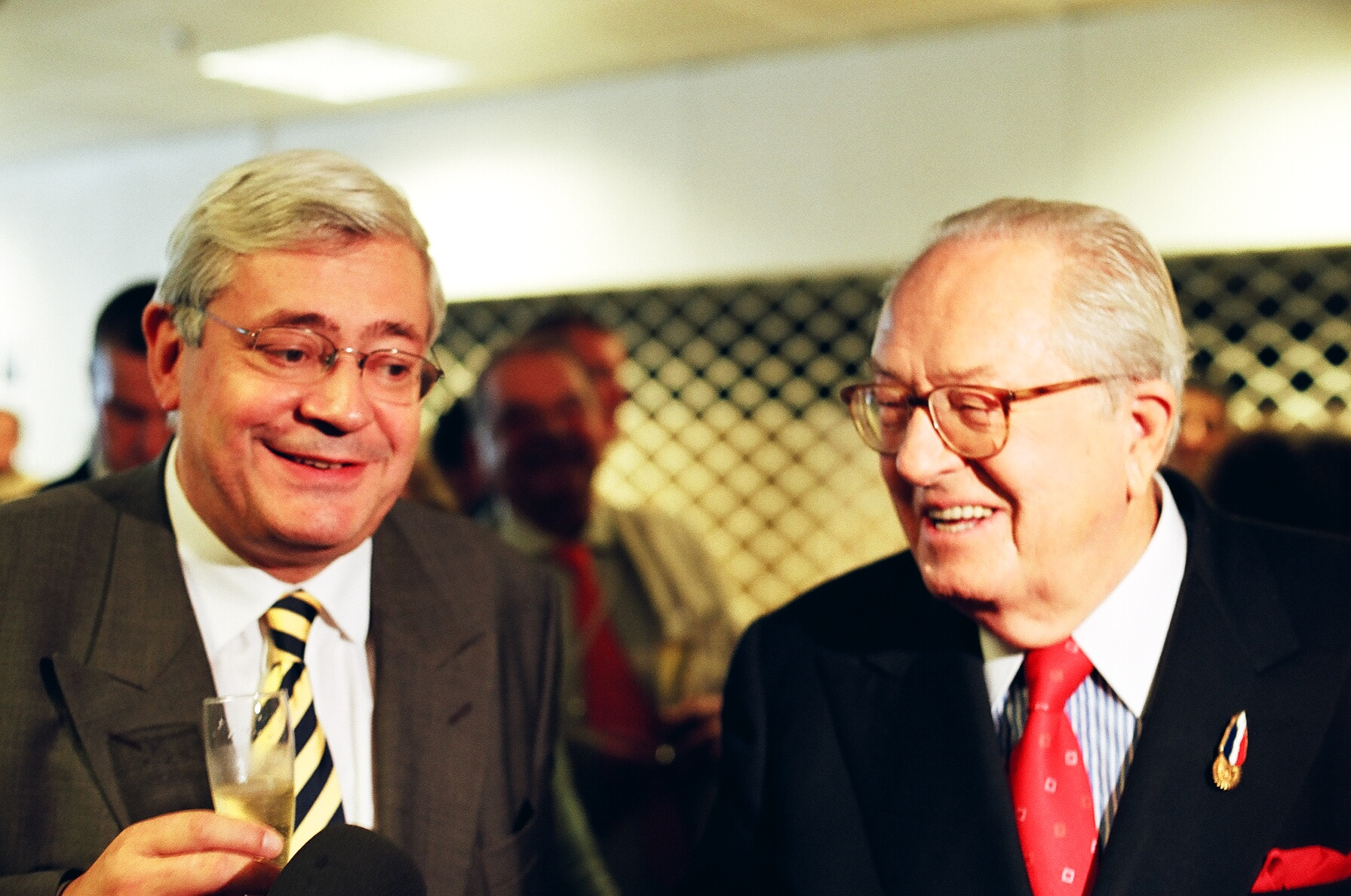
Bruno Gollnisch, vice president of the National Front, with Jean-Marie Le Pen at the 2005 BBR Festival.

Following the 2001 municipal elections, a left-wing coalition won control of the Paris City Council, and Bertrand Delanoë was elected mayor of Paris. Within the new majority, elected officials from the 12th arrondissement, where the festival was scheduled to take place in September, sought to ban it. However, Delanoë could not revoke the authorization granted by his predecessor Jean Tiberi. The 2001 edition therefore took place, but a ban was imposed for the 2002 edition, which was cancelled. The festival was later organized again in 2005 and 2006, this time in Le Bourget.

This return proved short-lived. Following the National Front's electoral setback in the 2007 legislative election and the resulting financial deficit, the 2007 edition of the festival was cancelled. It was not organized again afterward, with one exception in 2016.

=== 2016 edition ===
In July 2016, Marion Maréchal-Le Pen revived the Bleu-Blanc-Rouge festival with a "BBR Grand Sud gathering" held in Le Pontet, Vaucluse, on a "medieval theme". The event attracted around 1,500 activists and about a hundred National Front elected officials, as well as Marine Le Pen, at a time when the press reported tensions between her and her niece. On that occasion, Marion Maréchal-Le Pen stated that she had "never renounced the political lineage of Jean-Marie Le Pen" and expressed her desire "to establish, in the long term, this tradition of a popular festival around the nine federations of the Grand Sud". According to historian Valérie Igounet, by reusing the name "BBR," "Marion Maréchal-Le Pen is therefore continuing the National Front tradition, just like her grandfather."

== Festival proceedings ==
Jean-Marie Le Pen traditionally delivered a speech at the event, and a traditional Catholic Mass was celebrated on Sunday.

== Incidents ==
During the 1993 edition, Michel Soudais, a journalist from Politis, was violently assaulted by individuals close to the far-right group Groupe Union Défense.
