= Jacques Bordiot =

French journalist and writer

- Born: Jean Costes; 15 August 1900; Agen, France
- Died: 3 April 1983 (aged 82); Nancray-sur-Rimarde, France
- Occupations: Essayist, journalist
- Writing career
- Language: French
- Subjects: Anti-masonic conspiracy theories
- Military career
- Allegiance: France (1940-1945)
- Branch: French Navy
- Service years: 1940-1945
- Conflicts: World War II

Jean Costes (15 August 1900 – 3 April 1983), better known by his pen name Jacques Bordiot, was a French journalist and writer who focused mainly on anti-Masonic conspiracy theories.

== Life ==
Costes attended the École Navale and served as an artillery officer and naval lieutenant in the Middle East. In 1940, he chose to follow Marshal Philippe Pétain and join the Vichy armed forces. In 1945, he was dismissed from the French Navy and was then imprisoned during the épuration; one of his best known fellow detainees was Henry Coston.

During the 1950s he worked at Noël Jacquemart's Écho de la Presse and at La Vie des Métiers. He then worked for the extreme right-wing periodical Lectures françaises as an editorial writer and published several books on Freemasonry, synarchies, belief of Antisemitic conspiracies and "hidden rulers".

== Theories ==
According to Bordiot, between 1918 and 1922, Vladimir Lenin paid the investment bank of Kuhn, Loeb & Co. approximately 600 million gold rubles, equivalent to approximately $450 million, while after the Bolshevik Revolution the Rockefellers' company Standard Oil of New Jersey bought 50% of the oilfields in the Caucasus, although they were officially state property.

In his book Une main cachée dirige..., he analyses power in the Anglo-American sphere.

== Publications ==
- Infiltrations ennemies dans l'Église ([Enemy Infiltration in the Church]; with Henry Coston, Léon de Poncins, Édith Delamare, Gilles de Couessin), Paris, Librairie française, 1970.
- Une main cachée dirige... ([A Hidden Hand Directs...]), Paris: Documents et témoignages, 1974; rev. ed. 1984; Paris: Éditions du Trident, 1993. ISBN 2-87690-089-0
- L'Occident démantelé. Opinions et documents ([The Dismantled West: Opinions and Documents]), Paris: La Librairie française, 1976.
- Le Pouvoir occulte, fourrier du communisme. Vague rouge sur l'Europe ([The Hidden Power: Quartermaster of Communism. Red Wave Over Europe]), Chiré-en-Montreuil: Éditions de Chiré, 1976. ISBN 2-85190-019-6
- Le Parlement européen, une imposture, une utopie, un danger ([The European Parliament: A Sham, a Utopia, a Danger]), Paris: La Librairie française, 1978.
- La Comisión Trilateral y el poder internacional del dinero (in Spanish; [The Trilateral Commission and the International Power of Money]), Buenos Aires: Cabildo, 1980
- Le Gouvernement invisible. Documents et témoignage ([The Invisible Government: Documents and Testimony]), preface by Henry Coston, Paris: La Librairie française, 1983; 2nd ed. 1987.

== Sources ==
- Coston, Henry (2000) [1967]. Dictionnaire de la politiques française (Volume 5). La Librairie française; Chez l'auteur.
- "Lectures françaises a 40 ans! Témoignages anciens et récents" (["Lectures françaises at 40 years! Stories old and new])". Lectures Françaises. 479: 30. March 1997.
