= François Brigneau =

French journalist (1919–2012)

- Born: Well Emmanuel Allot; 30 April 1919; Concarneau, France
- Died: 9 April 2012 (aged 92); Saint-Cloud, France
- Resting place: Saint-Cloud
- Other names: Julien Guernec; Mathilde Cruz
- Occupation: Journalist
- Years active: 1945–2012
- Employer(s): Rivarol; Minute; Le Présent; National-Hebdo
- Known for: Author, activist
- Notable work: La Beauté qui meurt (1954)
- Political party: Republican Party of Liberty; National Front; Party of New Forces
- Movement: Ordre Nouveau
- Criminal charge: Membership of Milice
- Criminal penalty: Internment
- Criminal status: Released in 1945
- Awards: Grand Prix de Littérature Policière (1954)

François Brigneau (French pronunciation: [fʁɑ̃swa bʁiɲo]; 30 April 1919 – 9 April 2012) was a French far-right journalist and author who was a leading figure in Ordre Nouveau, the National Front and the Party of New Forces.

== Early years ==
Brigneau was born in Concarneau; his birth name was Well Emmanuel Allot. His father, a teacher, was known for his socialism and pacifism. He joined the Milice towards the end of the occupation and was imprisoned at Fresnes as a consequence. He shared a cell with Robert Brasillach shortly before the latter's execution and became an impassioned defender of Vichy France (a client state of Nazi Germany in World War 2) following his release. Around this time he married Georges Suarez's niece.

Brigneau's first political party involvement came in December 1945 when he joined the newly established Republican Party of Liberty, a largely conservative group that nonetheless attracted several former collaborators to its ranks. He also wrote for France-Dimanche in the immediate post-war era under the pseudonym Julien Guernec. Under this name he would also write for Rivarol, whilst he used various names to write for the likes of Paroles Françaises, Le Rouge et le Noir and L'independance Françaises and later for Le Courrier de Clan, Roger Holeindre's Le Cointre Poson and the eponymous La Chronique de Jean Brigneau. In the early 1960s he became most associated with the weekly Minute, initially as an editorial writer and then as editor-in-chief.

Brigneau also wrote fiction and as a crime novelist won the Grand Prix de Littérature Policière in 1954 for his novel La Beauté qui meurt.

== Front National ==
During the 1960s he wrote strongly in support of Jean-Louis Tixier-Vignancour, playing a leading role in promoting his campaign for the Presidency in 1965. He subsequently became a founder member of Ordre Nouveau (ON), assuming a leading role within the group. He belonged to the more moderate tendency within the ON which sought to distance far right nationalism from the earlier strains of fascism, in contrast to the likes of François Duprat who sought to emphasise fascist continuity. Within the ON Brigneau advocated a united front between different strands of the French far right. To this end he became a founder member of the Front National (FN) in 1972 and was an unsuccessful candidate for the party in the 1973 legislative election in Hauts-de-Seine. He was the first secretary-general of the movement and also served as vice-president.

Brigneau however soon clashed with Jean-Marie Le Pen, who he felt was too personally ambitious, and in June 1973 he split from the FN to become part of the dissident Faire Front group. In November 1974 this group, which had not been formalised but rather was a loose collection of leading ex-FN dissidents, was reconstituted as a political under the name Parti des forces nouvelles (PFN), with Brigneau taking a leading role in this group. He spent several years within the PFN as a member of its political bureau before resigning in 1981 after reassessing his position on Le Pen, whom he came to view as a "Breton genius" and an "inspired prophet". Around this time he also broke off his association with Minute, moving to Le Présent, a Catholic integrist journal to which he contributed antisemitic articles under the pseudonym Mathilde Cruz. He was removed from this position in late 1986 after the journal moderated its approach by de-emphasising attacks on the Jews.

== Later activity ==
Brigneau would subsequently write for National-Hebdo, his regular column "Le Journal d'un Homme Libre" largely focusing on the same antisemitic themes that had dominated his work for Le Présent, with a particular focus on conspiracy theories and the activities of B'nai B'rith. Although no longer a member of the FN his column also offered the party unwavering support. He would later become associated with Bruno Mégret and in 1998 lent his support to the National Republican Movement, a splinter group of the FN that Mégret established following a bitter split from Le Pen.

Brigneau died in 2012 aged 92. He was buried in Saint-Cloud with no representative of the FN in attendance at his funeral.
