= National Rally =

- Abbreviation: RN
- President: Jordan Bardella
- Vice Presidents: Louis Aliot; Laure Lavalette; Hélène Laporte
- Parliamentary party leader: Marine Le Pen (National Assembly)
- Founders: Jean-Marie Le Pen; Pierre Bousquet
- Founded: 5 October 1972; 54 years ago
- Preceded by: Ordre Nouveau
- Headquarters: 114 bis rue Michel-Ange; 75016 Paris
- Youth wing: Rassemblement national de la jeunesse
- Security wing: Department for Protection and Security
- Membership (2025): 160,000 (claimed)
- Ideology: French nationalism; National conservatism; Right-wing populism
- Political position: Far-right
- National affiliation: Rassemblement bleu Marine (2012–2017)
- European affiliation: Patriots.eu (since 2024) (Note: The party was formerly part of the Alliance of European National Movements (2009–2011).)
- European Parliament group: Patriots for Europe (since 2024) (Note: The party was formerly part of the European Right (1984–1989), the European Right (1989–1994), the Technical Group of Independents (1999–2001), Identity, Tradition, Sovereignty (2007), Europe of Nations and Freedom (2015–2019) and Identity and Democracy (2019–2024).)
- Colours: Navy blue (Note: Other customary colours include the following: Black Grey Brown Red.)
- National Assembly: 118 / 577
- Senate: 12 / 348
- European Parliament: 29 / 81
- Presidencies of Regional Councils: 0 / 17
- Regional Councillors: 242 / 1,758
- Presidencies of Departmental Councils: 0 / 101
- Departmental Councillors: 26 / 4,108

Website
- rassemblementnational.fr
- Politics of France; Political parties; Elections; A: The RN has been described as post-fascist, due to its continuity with the neo-fascist tradition of the National Front and the transformation of its political program towards electoral politics and the formal acceptance of liberal-democratic institutions.

The National Rally (French: Rassemblement national [ʁasɑ̃bləmɑ̃ nɑsjɔnal], RN), known as the National Front from 1972 to 2018 (French: Front national [fʁɔ̃ nɑsjɔnal], FN), is a French far-right political party, described as right-wing populist and nationalist. It has been the single largest parliamentary opposition party in the National Assembly since 2022. It opposes immigration, advocating significant cuts to legal immigration, protection of "French identity", and stricter control of illegal immigration.

The party was founded in 1972 by the Ordre Nouveau, and notably by Jean-Marie Le Pen; former Waffen-SS volunteers Pierre Bousquet and Léon Gaultier; neo-Nazi sympathizers such as François Duprat; and supporters nostalgic for French Algeria, such as Roger Holeindre, a member of the "Organisation armée secrète". Ordre Nouveau sought to establish the party as a legitimate political vehicle for the far-right movement. Jean-Marie Le Pen was its leader until his resignation in 2011. While its influence was marginal until 1984, the party's role as a nationalist electoral force has grown considerably. It has put forward a candidate at every presidential election but one since 1974. In the 2002 presidential election, Jean-Marie Le Pen advanced to the second round but finished a distant second in the runoff to Jacques Chirac. His daughter Marine Le Pen was elected to succeed him as party leader in 2012. Jordan Bardella assumed the leadership in 2022.

The party has seen an increase in its popularity and acceptance in French society in recent years. It has been accused of promoting xenophobia and antisemitism. While her father was nicknamed the "Devil of the Republic" by mainstream media and sparked outrage for hate speech, including Holocaust denial and Islamophobia, Marine Le Pen pursued a policy of "de-demonisation", trying to frame the party as being neither right nor left. She endeavoured to extract it from its far-right roots, as well as censuring controversial members like her father, who was suspended and then expelled from the party in 2015. Following her election as the leader of the party in 2011, the popularity of the FN grew. By 2015, the FN had established itself as a major political party in France. Sources traditionally label the party as far-right, though some outlets argue it has substantially moderated from its years under Le Pen to be classified as "right-wing populist" or "nationalist right".

On 31 March 2025, 25 National Rally members (including Marine Le Pen, former MEPs, and their assistants) were convicted of embezzlement for using European Parliament funds to fund National Front staff from 2004 to 2016. The sentences for several MEPs, including Le Pen, included bans on running for political office. Le Pen's appeal with a Paris appeals court was heard in early 2026, which ruled that while she was guilty, her sentence would be shortened, enabling her to run in the 2027 French Presidential Election.

== Party name ==
At the FN congress of 2018, Marine Le Pen proposed renaming the party Rassemblement National (National Rally), and this was confirmed by a ballot of party members. Formerly strongly Eurosceptic, the National Rally changed policies in 2019, deciding to campaign for a reform of the EU rather than leaving it and to keep the euro as the main currency of France (together with the CFP franc for some collectivities). In 2021, Le Pen announced that she wanted to remain in the Schengen Area, but to reserve free movement to nationals of a European Economic Area country, excluding residents of and visitors from another Schengen country.

== History ==
=== Background ===
The party's ideological roots can be traced to both Poujadism, a populist, small business tax protest movement founded in 1953 by Pierre Poujade and on right-wing dismay over the decision by French President Charles de Gaulle to abandon his promise of holding on to the colony of French Algeria, (many frontistes, including Le Pen, were part of an inner circle of returned servicemen known as Le cercle national des combattants). During the 1965 presidential election, Le Pen unsuccessfully attempted to consolidate the right-wing vote around presidential candidate Jean-Louis Tixier-Vignancour. Throughout the late 1960s and early 1970s, the French far-right consisted mainly of small, extreme movements such as Occident, Groupe Union Défense (GUD), and the Ordre Nouveau (ON).

Espousing France's Catholic and monarchist traditions, one of the primary progenitors of the ideology generally promoted by FN was the Action Française, founded at the end of the 19th century, and its descendants in the Restauration Nationale, a pro-monarchy group that supports the claim of the Count of Paris to the French throne.

=== Early years ===
==== Foundation (1972–1973) ====
While Ordre Nouveau had competed in some local elections since 1970, at its second congress, in June 1972, it decided to establish a new political party to contest the 1973 legislative elections. The party was launched on 5 October 1972 under the name National Front for French Unity (Front national pour l'unité française), or Front National. In order to create a broad movement, ON sought to model the new party on the more established Italian Social Movement (MSI), which at the time appeared to establish a broad coalition of the Italian hard right. The FN adopted a French version of the MSI tricolour flame as its logo. ON wanted to unite the various French far-right currents, and brought together "nationals" of Le Pen's group and Roger Holeindre's Party of French Unity; "nationalists" from Pierre Bousquet's Militant movement or François Brigneau's and Alain Robert's Ordre Nouveau; the anti-Gaullist Georges Bidault's Justice and Liberty movement; as well as former Poujadists, Algerian War veterans, and some monarchists, among others. Le Pen was chosen to be the first president of the party, as he was untainted with the militant public image of the ON and was a relatively moderate figure in the far-right.

The National Front fared poorly in the 1973 legislative elections, receiving 0.5% of the national vote, although Le Pen won 5% in his Paris constituency. In 1973, the party created a youth movement, the Front national de la jeunesse (National Front of Youth; FNJ). The rhetoric used in the campaign stressed old, far-right themes and was largely uninspiring to the electorate at the time. Otherwise, its official program at this point was relatively moderate, differing little from the mainstream right's. Le Pen sought the "total fusion" of the currents in the party, and warned against "crude activism." The FNJ were banned from the party later that year. The move towards the mainstream cost it many leading members and much of its militant base.

In the 1974 presidential election, Le Pen failed to find a mobilising theme for his campaign, since many of its platform's major issues, such as anti-communism, were shared by most of the mainstream right. Other FN issues included calls for increased French birth rates, immigration reduction (although this was downplayed), establishment of a professional army, abrogation of the Évian Accords, and generally the creation of a "French and European renaissance." Despite being the only nationalist candidate, he failed to gain the support of the whole of the far-right, as the various groups either rallied behind other candidates or called for voter abstention. The campaign further lost ground when the Revolutionary Communist League made public a report of Le Pen's alleged involvement in torture during his time in Algeria. In his first participation in a presidential election, Le Pen won only 0.8% of the national vote.

==== FN–PFN rivalry (1973–1981) ====
Following the 1974 election, the FN was obscured by the appearance of the Party of New Forces (PFN), founded by FN dissidents (largely from the ON). Their competition weakened both parties throughout the 1970s. Along with the growing influence of François Duprat and his "revolutionary nationalists", the FN gained several new groups of supporters in the late 1970s and early 1980s: Jean-Pierre Stirbois (1977) and his "solidarists", Bruno Gollnisch (1983), Bernard Antony (1984) and his Catholic fundamentalists, as well as Jean-Yves Le Gallou (1985) and the Nouvelle Droite. Following the death of Duprat in a bomb attack in 1978, the revolutionary nationalists left the party, while Stirbois became Le Pen's deputy as his solidarists effectively ousted the neo-fascist tendency in the party leadership. A radical group split off in 1980 and founded the French Nationalist Party, dismissing the FN as becoming "too Zionist" with Le Pen being a "puppet of the Jews." The far right was marginalised altogether in the 1978 legislative elections, although the PFN came out better off. In the first election for the European Parliament in 1979, the PFN became part of an attempt to build a "Euro-Right" alliance of the continent's far-right parties, and was in the end the only one of the two that contested the election. It fielded Jean-Louis Tixier-Vignancour as its primary candidate, while Le Pen called for voter abstention.

For the 1981 presidential election, both Le Pen and Pascal Gauchon of the PFN declared their intentions to run. However, an increased requirement regarding obtaining signatures of support from elected officials had been introduced for the election, which left both Le Pen and Gauchon unable to participate. (Note: In France, parties have to secure support from a specific number of elected officials, from a specific number of departments, in order to be eligible to run for election. In 1976, the number of required elected officials was increased fivefold from the 1974 presidential cycle, and the number of departments threefold.)

The election was won by François Mitterrand of the Socialist Party (PS), a results that brought the political left to national power for the first time in the Fifth Republic; Mitterrand immediately dissolved the National Assembly and called a snap legislative election. With only three weeks to prepare its campaign, the FN fielded only a limited number of candidates and won only 0.2% of the national vote. The PFN was even worse off, and the election marked the effective end of competition from the party. The Socialists attained their best ever result with an absolute majority in the 1981 legislative election.

The "socialist takeover" led to a radicalisation in centre-right, anti-communist, and anti-socialist voters.

=== Jean-Marie Le Pen's leadership ===
==== Electoral breakthrough (1982–1988) ====
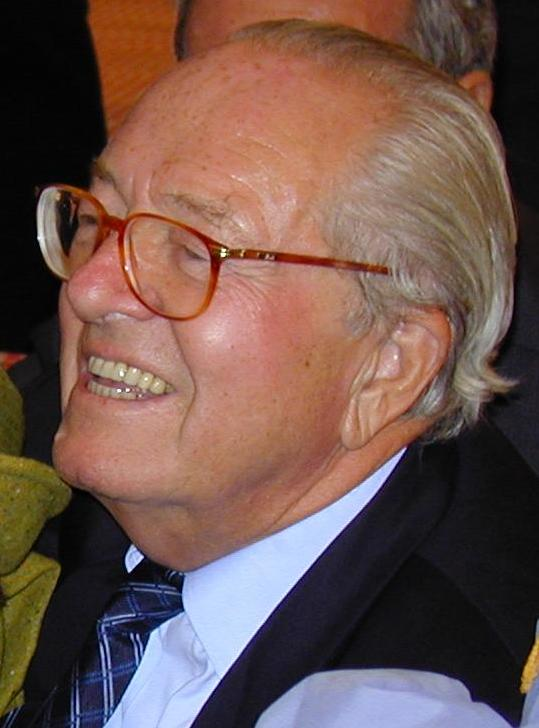
Jean-Marie Le Pen, leader of the National Front from 1972 to 2011

While the French party system had been dominated by polarisation and competition between the clear-cut ideological alternatives of two political blocs in the 1970s, the two blocs had largely moved towards the centre by the mid-1980s. This led many voters to perceive the blocs as more or less indistinguishable, particularly after the Socialists' "austerity turn" (tournant de la rigueur) of 1983, in turn inducing them to seek out to new political alternatives. By October 1982, Le Pen supported the prospect of deals with the mainstream right, provided that the FN did not have to soften its position on "key issues." In the 1983 municipal elections, the centre-right Rally for the Republic (RPR) and the centrist Union for French Democracy (UDF) formed alliances with the FN in a number of towns. The most notable result came in the 20th arrondissement of Paris, where Le Pen was elected to the local council with 11% of the vote. Subsequent by-elections kept media attention on the party, which was for the first time able to pose as a viable component of the broader right. In a by-election in Dreux in October 1983, the FN won 17% of the vote. With the choice of defeat to the political left or dealing with the FN, the local RPR and UDF agreed to form an alliance with the FN, causing a national sensation; together, they won the second round with 55% of the vote. The events in Dreux were a monumental turning point in the rise of the FN.

Le Pen protested the "media boycott" against his party by sending letters to President Mitterrand in mid-1982. Following an exchange of letters with Le Pen, Mitterrand instructed the heads of the main television channels to give equitable coverage to the FN. In January 1984, the party made its first appearance in a monthly poll of political popularity, in which 9% of respondents held a "positive opinion" of the FN and some support for Le Pen personally. The next month, Le Pen was, for the first time, invited on a prime-time television interview programme, which he himself later deemed "the hour that changed everything".

In the June 1984 European elections, the FN won 11% of the vote and ten seats, (Note: The 1984 European election used proportional representation system.) in a contest that was considered to have a low level of importance by the public, which played to the party's advantage. The FN, notably, made inroads in both right-wing and left-wing constituencies, and finished 2nd in a number of towns. While many Socialists had arguably exploited the party in order to divide the right, Mitterrand later conceded that he had underestimated Le Pen. By July, 17% of opinion poll respondents held a positive opinion of the FN.

By the early 1980s, the FN featured a mosaic of ideological tendencies and attracted figures who were previously resistant to the party. The party managed to draw supporters from the mainstream right, including some high-profile defectors from the RPR, the UDF, and the National Centre of Independents and Peasants (CNIP). In the 1984 European elections, eleven of the 81 FN candidates came from these parties, while the party's list also included an Arab and a Jew - although in unwinnable positions. Former collaborators were also accepted in the party, as Le Pen urged the need for "reconciliation", arguing that forty years after the war the only important question was whether or not "they wish to serve their country". The FN won 8.7% overall support in the 1985 cantonal elections, netting over 30% in some areas.

For the 1986 legislative elections, the FN took advantage of the new, proportional representation system (Note: The system had been designed by Mitterand's party to soften its predicted weakening in the polls.) and won 9.8% of the vote and 35 seats in the National Assembly. Many of these seats were filled by a new wave of "respectable" political operatives, notables, who had joined the party after its 1984 success. The RPR won a majority with smaller, centre-right parties, and thus avoided the need to deal with the FN. Although FN was unable to exercise any real political influence, the party could project an image of political legitimacy. Several of its legislative proposals were controversial and had a socially reactionary and xenophobic character, among them attempts to restore the death penalty, expel foreigners who "proportionally committed more crimes than the French", restrict naturalisation, introduce a "national preference" for employment, impose taxes on the hiring of foreigners by French companies, and privatise Agence France-Presse.

The party's time in the National Assembly effectively came to an end when Jacques Chirac reinstated the two-round system of majority voting for the next election. In the regional elections held on the same day, FN won 137 seats, and gained representation in 21 of the 22 French regional councils. The RPR depended on FN support to win presidencies in some regional councils, and the FN won vice-presidential posts in four regions.

==== Consolidation (1988–1997) ====
Le Pen's campaign for the presidential election unofficially began in the months following the 1986 election. To promote his statesmanship credentials, he made trips to South East Asia, the United States, and Africa. The management of the formal campaign, launched in April 1987, was entrusted to Bruno Mégret, one of the new notables. With his entourage, Le Pen traversed France for the entire period and, helped by Mégret, employed an American-style campaign. Le Pen's presidential campaign was highly successful; no candidates came close to rival his ability to excite audiences at rallies and boost ratings at television appearances. Using a populist tone, he presented himself as the representative of the people against the "gang of four" (RPR, UDF, PS, Communist Party), while the central theme of his campaign was "national preference". In the 1988 presidential election, Le Pen won an unprecedented 14.4% of the vote, and double the votes of 1984.

In the snap 1988 legislative elections, the FN was hurt by the return of two-ballot majority voting, by the limited campaign period, and by the departure of many notables. In the election, the party retained its 9.8% support from the previous legislative election, but was reduced to a single seat in the National Assembly. Following some anti-Semitic comments made by Le Pen and the FN newspaper National Hebdo in the late 1980s, some valuable FN politicians left the party. Soon, other quarrels left the party without its remaining member of the National Assembly. In November 1988, general secretary Jean-Pierre Stirbois, who, together with his wife Marie-France, had been instrumental in the FN's early electoral successes, died in a car accident, leaving Bruno Mégret as the unrivalled, de facto FN deputy leader. The party only got 5% in the 1988 cantonal elections, while the RPR announced it would reject any alliance with the FN, a rejections that now included the local level.

In the 1989 European elections, the FN held on to its ten seats, winning 11.7% of the vote.

In the wake of FN's electoral success, the immigration debate, growing concerns over Islamic fundamentalism, and the fatwa against Salman Rushdie by Ayatollah Khomeini, the 1989 affaire du foulard was the first major test of the relations between the values of the French Republic and Islam. Following that success, surveys found that French public opinion was largely negative towards Islam. In a 1989 legislative by-election in Dreux, FN candidate Marie-France Stirbois, campaigning mostly on an anti-Islamism platform, returned a symbolic FN presence to the National Assembly. By the early 1990s, some mainstream politicians began also employing anti-immigration rhetoric. In the first round of the 1993 legislative elections, the FN soared to 12.7% of the overall vote, but did not win a single seat due to the nature of the electoral system. (Note: If the election had used proportional representation, it would have won 64 seats.) In the 1995 presidential election, votes for Le Pen rose to 15% of the total.

The FN won an absolute majority (and thus the mayorship) in three cities in the 1995 municipal elections: Toulon, Marignane, and Orange. (Note: It had won a mayorship only once before, in the small town of Saint-Gilles-du-Gard in 1989.) Le Pen then declared that his party would implement its "national preference" policy, with the risk of provoking the central government and being at odds with the laws of the Republic. The FN's elected representatives pursued interventionist policies with regards to the new cultural complexion of their towns by directly influencing artistic events, cinema schedules, and library holdings, as well as cutting or halting subsidies for multicultural associations. The party won Vitrolles, its fourth town, in a 1997 by-election, where similar policies were subsequently pursued. Vitrolles' new mayor Catherine Mégret, who ran in place of her husband Bruno, went further in one significant measure, introducing a special 5,000-franc allowance for babies born to at least one parent of French (or EU) nationality. The measure was ruled illegal by a court, which sentenced her to a suspended prison sentence, a fine, and a two-year ban from office.

==== Turmoil and split of the MNR (1997–2002) ====
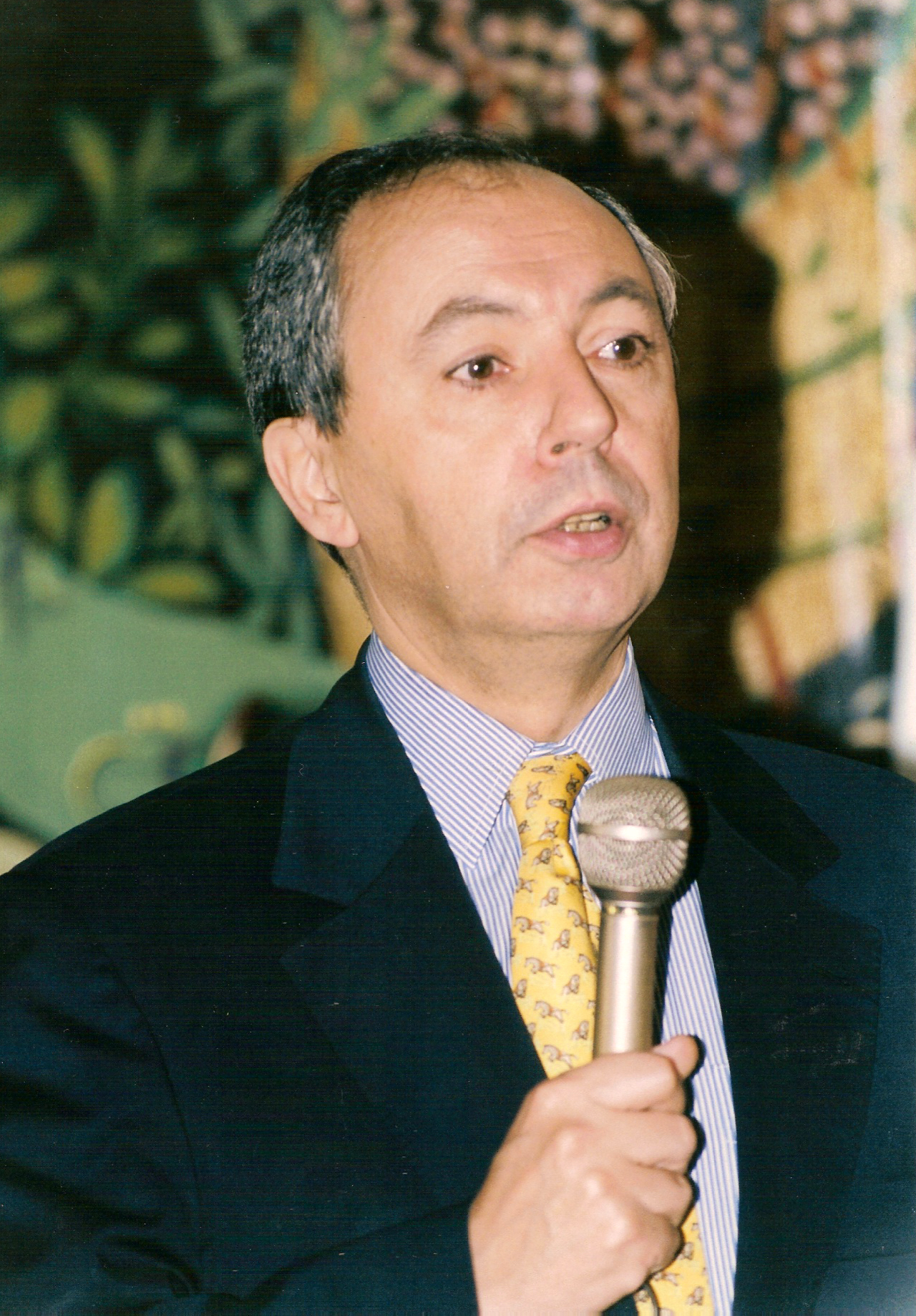
Bruno Mégret and his faction broke out from the FN to form the MNR party.

In the 1997 legislative elections, the FN polled its best-ever result with 15.3% support in metropolitan France. The result showed that the party had become established enough to compete without its leader, who had decided not to run, in order to focus on the 2002 presidential election. Although it won only one seat in the National Assembly, in Toulon, it advanced to the second round in 132 constituencies. The FN was arguably more influential at that time than it had been in 1986 with its 35 seats. While Bruno Mégret and Bruno Gollnisch, favoured tactical cooperation with a weakened centre-right following the left's victory, Le Pen rejected any such "compromise." In the tenth FN national congress in 1997, Mégret stepped up his position in the party as its rising star and a potential leader following Le Pen. Le Pen however refused to designate Mégret as his successor-elect, and instead made his wife Jany the leader of the FN list for the upcoming European election.

Mégret and his faction left the FN in January 1999 and founded the National Republican Movement (MNR), effectively splitting the FN in half at most levels. Many of those who joined the new MNR had joined the FN in the mid-1980s, in part from the Nouvelle Droite, with a vision of building bridges to the parliamentary right. Many had also been particularly influential in intellectualising the FN's policies on immigration, identity, and "national preference". Following the split, Le Pen denounced them as "extremist" and "racist". Support for the two parties was almost equal in the 1999 European election, as the FN polled its lowest national score since 1984 with just 5.7%, and the MNR won 3.3%. The effects of the split, and competition from more moderate nationalists, resulted in their combined support being lower than the FN result of 1984.

==== Presidential run-off (2002) ====
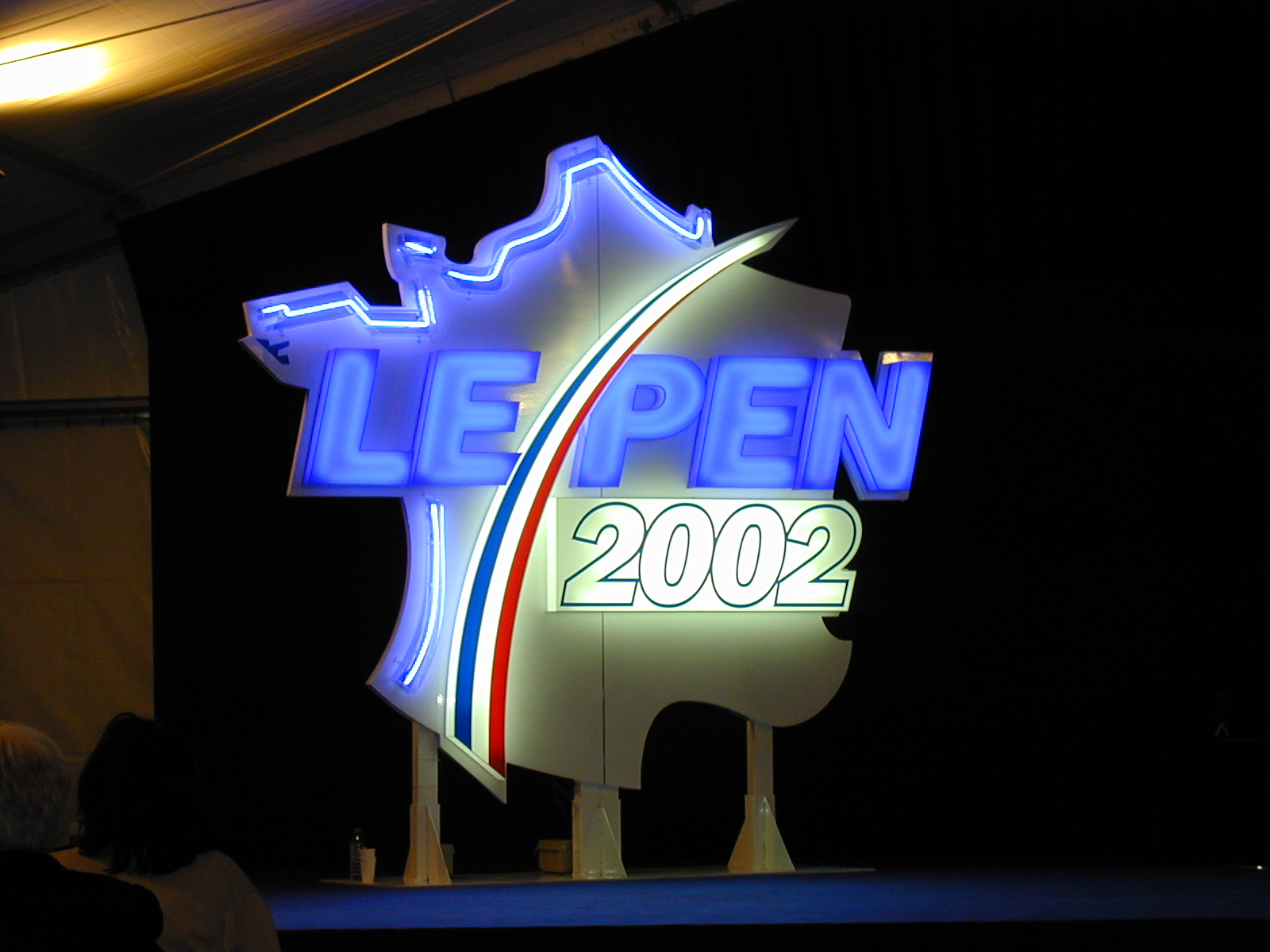
Logo for Le Pen's 2002 presidential campaign

For the 2002 presidential election, opinion polls had predicted a run-off between incumbent President Chirac and Socialist candidate Lionel Jospin. In a shock outcome, Le Pen outperformed Jospin (by 0.7%) in the 1st round, placing second and advancing to the runoff. This resulted in the first presidential run-off since 1969 without a leftist candidate and the first ever with a candidate from the far-right. To Le Pen's advantage, the election campaign had increasingly focused on law-and-order issues, helped by media attention on a number of violent incidents. Jospin had also been weakened due to the competition between an exceptional number of leftist parties. Nevertheless, Chirac did not even have to campaign in the second round, as widespread anti-Le Pen protests from the media and public opinion culminated on May Day in a demonstration of 1.5 million participants across France. Chirac also refused to debate with Le Pen, and the traditional televised debate was cancelled. In the end, Chirac won the presidential run-off with an unprecedented 82.2% of the vote, with 71% of his votes—according to polls—cast simply "to block Le Pen". Following the presidential election, the main centre-right parties merged to form the broad-based Union for a Popular Movement (UMP). The FN failed to hold on to Le Pen's support for the 2002 legislative elections, in which it got 11.3% of the vote. It nevertheless outpolled Mégret's MNR, which had fielded the same number of candidates but won a mere 1.1% support.

==== Decline (2003–2010) ====
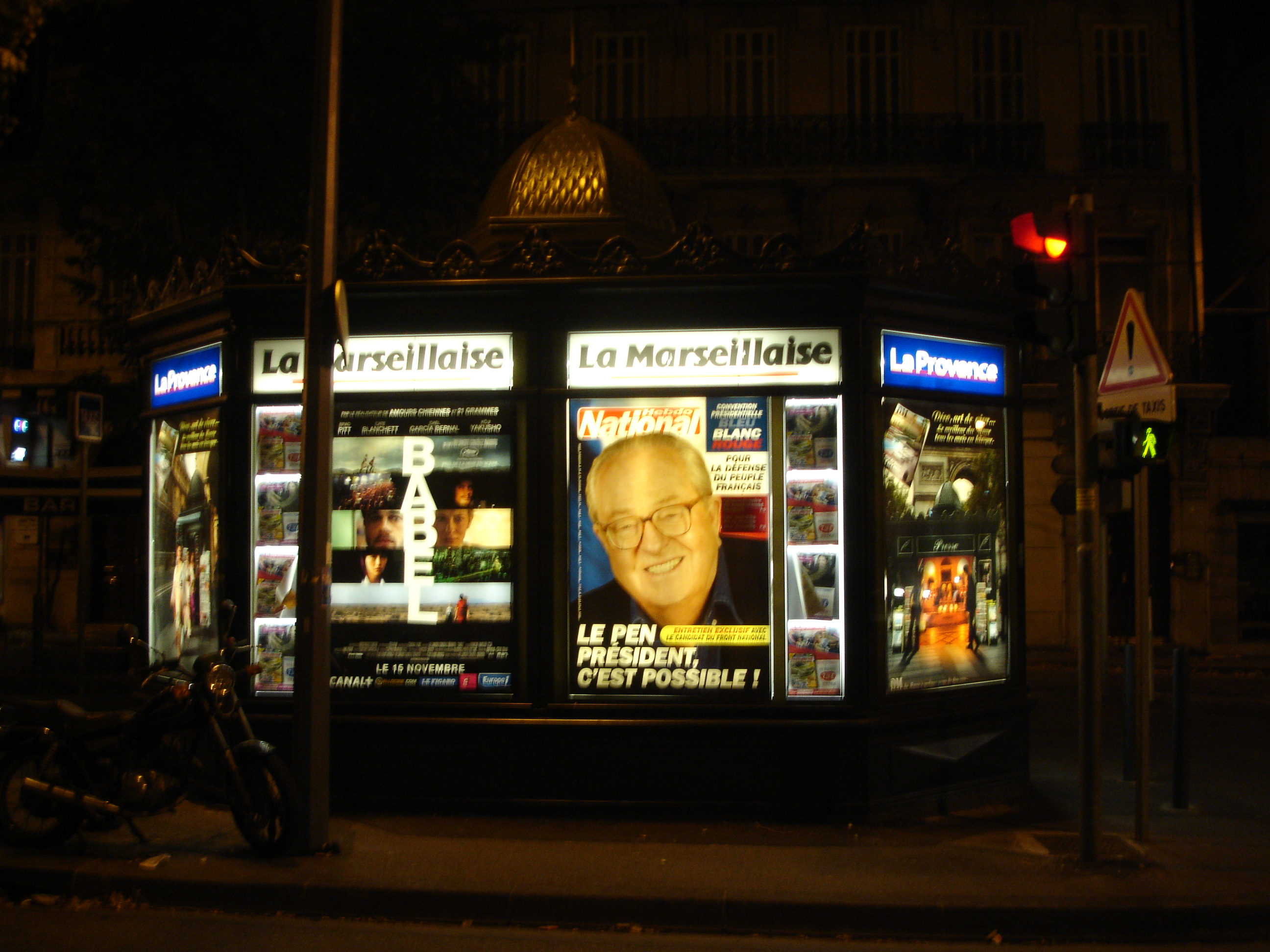
National advertisement in Marseille for Le Pen's 2007 presidential bid

A new electoral system of two-round voting had been introduced for the 2004 regional elections, in part in an attempt to reduce the FN's influence in regional councils. The FN won 15.1% of the vote in metropolitan France, almost the same as in 1998, but its number of councillors was almost halved due to the new system. For the 2004 European elections, too, a new system less favourable to the FN had been introduced. The party regained some of its strength from 1999, earning 9.8% of the vote and seven seats.

For the 2007 presidential election, Le Pen and Mégret agreed to join forces. Le Pen came 4th in the election with 11% of the vote, and the party won no seats in the legislative election of the same year. The party's 4.3% support was the lowest figure since the 1981 election and only one candidate, Marine Le Pen in Pas de Calais, reached the runoff -where she was defeated by the Socialist incumbent. These electoral defeats partly accounted for the party's financial problems. Le Pen announced the sale of the FN headquarters in Saint-Cloud, Le Paquebot, and of his personal armoured car. In 2008, a French court handed Le Pen a three-month suspended sentence and a €10,000 fine for remarks he made in 2005 that contravened France's law against Holocaust denial. Twenty permanent employees of the FN were also dismissed in 2008.

In the 2010 regional elections the FN appeared to have re-emerged on the political scene after surprisingly winning almost 12% of the overall vote and 118 seats.

=== Marine Le Pen's leadership ===
==== Revival of the FN (2011–2012) ====
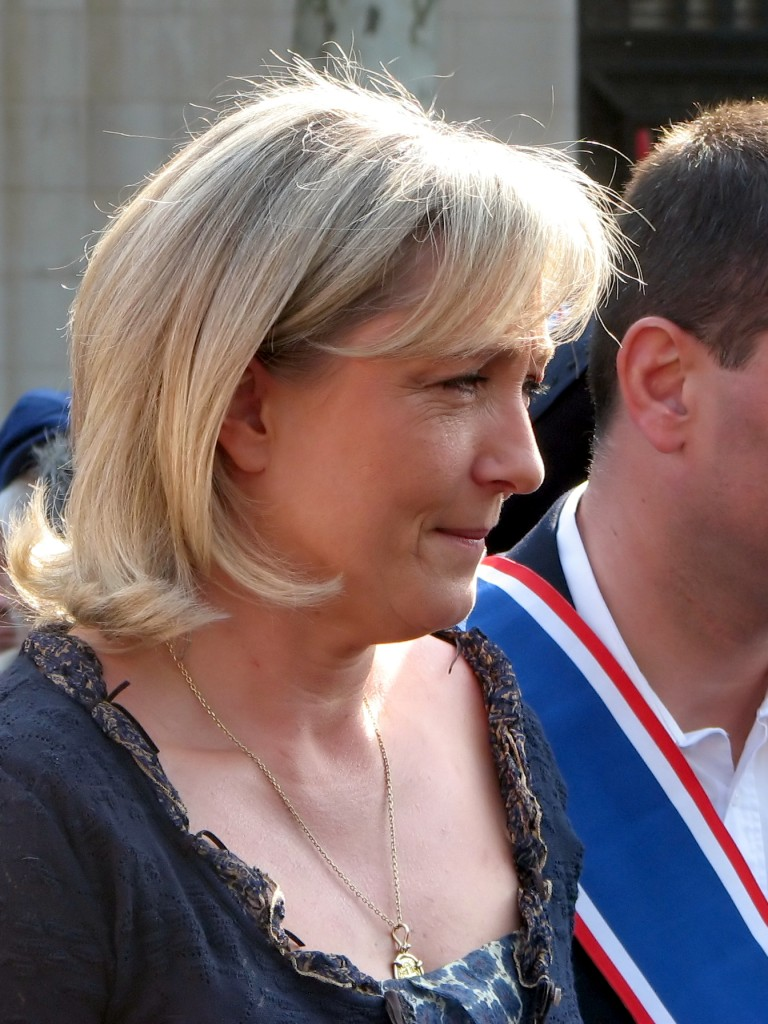
Marine Le Pen, National Front president (2011–2022)

Results by region at the first round of the 2015 French regional elections, with regions where the National Front gained the most votes in grey

Jean-Marie Le Pen announced in September 2008 that he would retire as FN president in 2010. Le Pen's daughter Marine Le Pen and FN executive vice-president Bruno Gollnisch campaigned to succeed Le Pen, with Marine's candidacy backed by her father. On 15 January 2011, it was announced that Marine Le Pen had received the two-thirds vote needed to become the new leader of the FN. She embarked on a project to transform the FN into a "mainstream party" by softening its xenophobic image. Opinion polls showed the party's popularity increase under Marine Le Pen, and in the 2011 cantonal elections the party won 15% of the overall vote (up from 4.5% in 2008). However, due to the French electoral system, the party only won 2 of the 2,026 seats that were up for election. From January 2011 to December 2014 the FN's membership roughly tripled.

At the end of 2011, the National Front withdrew from the far-right Alliance of European National Movements and joined the more moderate European Alliance of Freedom. In October 2013, Bruno Gollnisch and Jean-Marie Le Pen resigned from their position in the AENM.

For the 2012 presidential election, opinion polls showed Marine Le Pen as a serious challenger, with a few polls even suggesting that she could win the first round of the election. In the event, Le Pen came 3rd in the first round, scoring 17.9% – the best showing ever in a presidential election for the FN at that time.

In the 2012 legislative election, the National Front won two seats: Gilbert Collard and Marion Maréchal.

In two polls about presidential favourites, conducted in April and May 2013, Marine le Pen polled ahead of president François Hollande but behind Nicolas Sarkozy.

==== Electoral successes (2012–2017) ====
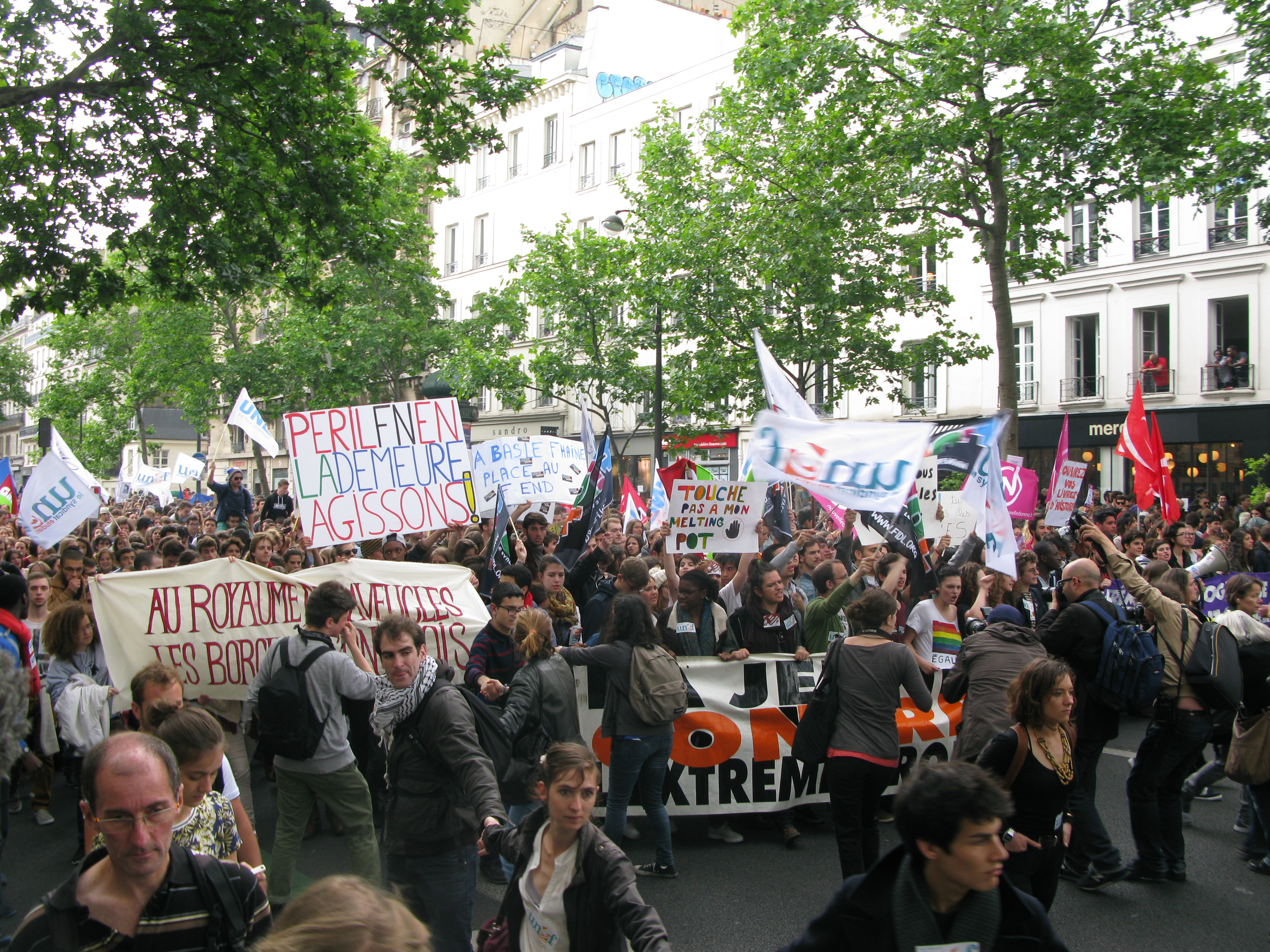
Demonstration against the National Front in Paris after the results of the 2014 election

In the municipal elections held on 23 and 30 March 2014, lists officially supported by the National Front won mayoralties in 12 cities: Beaucaire, Cogolin, Fréjus, Hayange, Hénin-Beaumont, Le Luc, Le Pontet, Mantes-la-Ville, the 7th arrondissement of Marseille, Villers-Cotterêts, Béziers and Camaret-sur-Aigues. While some of these cities were in southern France (like Fréjus) which traditionally votes more for right-wing parties than the rest of the country, others were located in northern France, where Socialist Party had been strong until the 2010s. Following these elections, the National Front had, in cities of over 1,000 inhabitants, 1,546 and 459 councilors at two different levels of local government. The international media described the results as "historic".

The National Front received 4,712,461 votes in the 2014 European Parliament election, finishing first with 24.86% of the vote and 24 of France's 74 seats. This was said to be "the first time the anti-immigrant, anti-EU party had won a nationwide election in its four-decade history." The party's success came as a "shock" in France and the EU.

==== Front National becomes Rassemblement National (2018) ====
At the conclusion of the 11 March 2018 party congress in Lille, Marine Le Pen proposed renaming the party to Rassemblement national (National Rally) while keeping the flame as its logo. The name was not unknown in French politics: it recalled both the National Popular Rally, a collaborationist party founded by Marcel Déat in 1941 with the help of Eugène Deloncle, founder of La Cagoule, and led by Georges Albertini during the Occupation and the Rassemblement National Français, founded by the far-right lawyer and politician Jean-Louis Tixier-Vignancour, whose presidential campaign in 1965 was managed by Jean-Marie Le Pen. It had already been used by the FN for its parliamentary group between 1986 and 1988. Nevertheless, the name change faced opposition from an already-existing party named "Rassemblement national", whose president, Igor Kurek, described the group as "Gaullist and republican right" and who had registered the name with the INPI in 2013. On 1 June, Le Pen announced that the name change was approved by party adherents with 80.81% in favour.

==== Presidential and parliamentary election, rebranding (2017–2022) ====
On 24 April 2017, a day after the first round of the presidential election, Marine Le Pen announced that she would temporarily step down as the party's leader in an attempt to "unite voters." In the second round of voting, Le Pen was defeated 66.1% to 33.9% by her rival Emmanuel Macron of En Marche!

During the following parliamentary elections, the FN received 13.02% of the vote, a little lower than the 13.07% of the 2012 elections. The party appeared to have suffered from a demobilisation of its voters from the previous vote. Nonetheless, eight deputies (six FN and two affiliated) were elected, the best number for the FN in a parliamentary election using a majoritarian electoral system since its creation. (Note: The proportional representation was used in the 1986 elections.) Marine Le Pen was elected to the National Assembly for the first time, while Gilbert Collard was re-elected. FN's 23-year-old Ludovic Pajot became the youngest ever member of the French parliament.

In late 2017, Florian Philippot left the FN and formed The Patriots, on the grounds that the FN had "softened" its position on leaving the EU and abandoning the Euro.

In 2018, Steve Bannon, former advisor to Donald Trump before and after his 2016 election, gave what has been described as a "populist pep talk". Bannon advised the party members to "Let them call you racist, let them call you xenophobes, let them call you nativists. Wear it like a badge of honor. Because every day, we get stronger and they get weaker. ... History is on our side and will bring us victory." Bannon's remarks brought the members to their feet.

In January 2019, ex-Sarkozy minister Thierry Mariani and former conservative lawmaker Jean-Paul Garraud, left Les Républicains (LR) and joined the National Rally.

During a 2021 debate, Marine Le Pen was called "soft" on Islam by the Minister of the Interior in Macron's government, Gérald Darmanin. Marine Le Pen called for a "national-unity government" that would include persons such as Nicolas Dupont-Aignan, former LR officials, and souverainistes on the left, such as former economy minister Arnaud Montebourg.

In the months before the 2021 French regional elections, political commentators noted an increased moderation in the FN's platform that aimed to attract conservative voters, as well as a new image being promoted by the party as a force of la droite populaire, i.e. the popular right, the social right. The party, nonetheless, fared badly in these elections.

In the 2022 French presidential election, Le Pen again reached the 2nd round with 23.15% of the votes, though she was defeated by incumbent Macron, after receiving 41.45% of the votes in the run-off. Marine Le Pen received 13 million votes in the second round, more than double the 5.25 million Jean Marie Le Pen received in 2002.

In the 2022 French legislative election, for which polling had indicated that FN would win only between 15 and 45 seats in the National Assembly, the party received 18.68% of the votes in the first round and won 89 seats in the second round, a significant increase from the previous total of 8 seats. The 89 seats enabled the National Rally to form a parliamentary group, for which at least 15 deputies are required, for the first time since 1986, when the national assembly was elected by proportional voting. The result made the party the 3rd largest party in the assembly and the largest parliamentary opposition group.

=== Jordan Bardella's leadership ===
Jordan Bardella was elected president of the RN on 5 November 2022, ending Marine Le Pen's period as president of the party. Le Pen remained president of the RN's parliamentary group.

==== 2024 European parliament election ====
In the 2024 European parliamentary elections, the RN won the most delegates of any single party (30). It won 31.4% of the vote, the first time since 1984 that a list had won more than 30% of the vote in a European Parliament election in France. On 8 July, Bardella became president of the Patriots for Europe, originally founded by Viktor Orbán with the Czech ANO and the Austrian FPÖ parties on a platform of refusing military aid to Ukraine, anti-immigration, and pro-"traditional family" values. The group, the third largest in the parliament, also includes members from the Flemish Vlaams Belang, the Dutch PVV, and the Italian Lega per Salvini Premier.

The National Rally's success in the European elections led to the dissolution of the French lower house by Emmanuel Macron on 9 June 2024.

==== 2024 legislative election ====
In June 2024, the party joined with the micro-party "To the right! Friends of Eric Ciotti", forming the union of the far-right in the 2024 French legislative election. Together, these parties secured the largest share of the vote in the first round with 33.15% of the vote. More voters who reported struggling financially voted for the RN than for any other party.

Based on their first round performance, the RN will receive around €15 million per year in government subsidies for the five years following the 2024 election: each vote in the first round being worth €1.61 per year to the party.

According to opinion polls, the National Rally were expected to get 230–270 seats, close to an absolute majority, However, 2–3 days before the second round, the RN were predicted to win around 170–220 seats. After the exit polls on 7 July, that figure was reduced to 120–170 seats, and the New Popular Front were predicted to win 150–190 seats, slightly ahead of president Macron's Ensemble alliance. Finally, the RN won only 142 seats, ranking third in the election.

The National Rally won vast swathes of southern France, including every seat in the departement of Gard.

== Policies ==
The party's ideology has been broadly described by scholars, including James Shields, Nonna Mayer, Jean-Yves Camus, Nicolas Lebourg and Michel Winock as nationalist, far-right (or Nouvelle Droite) and populist. Jean-Yves Camus and Nicolas Lebourg, following Pierre-André Taguieff's analysis, include the party in an old French tradition of "national populism" that can be traced back to Boulangism. National populists combine the social values of the left and the political values of the right and advocate a referendary republic that would bypass traditional political divisions and institutions. Aiming at unity of the political (the demos), ethnic (the ethnos), and social (the working class) interpretations of the "people", they claim to defend the "average Frenchman" and "common sense", against the "betrayal of inevitably corrupt elites". The party has been also described as national conservative.

In addition to its neo-fascist origins with Ordre Nouveau, the National Front itself has been described as neo-fascist, and, according to the historian Pierre Milza, it was specifically a "mixture of neo-fascism, counter-revolutionary conservatism and national populism".

The party has changed considerably since its foundation, pursuing modernisation and pragmatism and adapting to the changing political climate. Its message has increasingly influenced mainstream political parties, and some commentators have described it as right-wing, moving closer towards the centre-right. In the 2010s, the party attempted to "de-demonise" its image and changed its name to National Rally. A 2022 Kanar survey found that 46% of French voters saw Marine Le Pen as "representing a patriotic Right attached to traditional values", although 50% saw her as "a danger to democracy".

=== Society ===
==== Gender and sexuality ====
The party opposed the 2016 criminalisation of prostitution in France on the grounds that it would negatively affect the safety of sex workers.

In the 2002 legislative elections, the first under the new gender parity provision in the French Constitution, Le Pen's National Front was among the few parties to come close to meeting the law, with 49% female candidates; Jospin's Socialists had 36%, and Chirac's UMP had 19.6%. Women voters in France were traditionally more attracted to mainstream conservative parties than the radical right until the 2000s. The proportion of women in the party has risen to 39% by 2017.

==== Identitarian politics ====
A 2019 undercover investigation by Al Jazeera uncovered links between high-ranking National Rally figures and Generation Identity, a far-right Identitarian youth group. In secretly taped conversations, RN leaders endorsed goals of Generation Identity and discussed plans to "remigrate" immigrants, effectively sending them back to their countries of origin, if the RN came to power. Christelle Lechevalier, a RN Member of the European Parliament (MEP), said that many RN leaders held similar opinions as the GI, but sought to hide them from voters.

==== Law and order ====
In 2002, Jean-Marie Le Pen campaigned on a law-and-order platform of zero tolerance, harsher sentencing, increased prison capacity, and a referendum on re-introducing the death penalty. In its 2001 programme, the party linked the breakdown of law and order to immigration, deeming immigration a "mortal threat to civil peace in France."

Marine Le Pen rescinded the party's traditional support for the death penalty with her 2017 campaign launch, instead announcing support for imprisonment "in perpetuity" for the "worst crimes" in February 2017. In 2022, she proposed to hold a referendum on capital punishment in France if she were elected.

=== Immigration ===
Since its early years, the party has called for immigration to be reduced. The theme of exclusion of non-European immigrants was brought into the party in 1978 and became increasingly important in the 1980s.

After the 1999 split, the FN cultivated a more moderate image on immigration and Islam, no longer calling for the systematic repatriation of legal immigrants but still supporting the deportation of illegal, criminal, or unemployed immigrants.

Following the Arab Spring (2011) rebellions in several countries, Marine Le Pen campaigned for a halt to the migration of Tunisian and Libyan immigrants to Europe.

In November 2015, the party stated its goal to have a net legal immigration rate (immigrants minus emigrants) of 10,000 in France per year. Since 2017, that yearly net immigration rate was around 182,000 if one takes into account only people born abroad from non-French parents, but was around 44,000 if one also includes the departures and returns of French expatriates.

In 2022, Marine Le Pen proposed an end to "family reunification" rights for foreigners with residency permits and the end to the right to automatic citizenship for children born in France to foreigners living there. She also supported a referendum on immigration policy.

==== Islam ====
The National Rally has sought to restrict Islamic practice in France. In 2011, Marine Le Pen warned that wearing full-face veils is "the tip of the iceberg" of Islamisation of French culture. In 2021, and again in 2022, Le Pen again proposed banning the hijab (headscarf which only covers the head but not face) in public. Le Pen also proposed to ban the production of both halal and kosher meat. Le Pen says she is "against the visibility of Islam" but not Islam per se.

The National Rally is considered Islamophobic by many. The party has connected immigration to Islamic terrorism.

Paradoxically, Mayotte, an overseas department on the Indian Ocean with an over-90% Muslim majority has been a stronghold for the party, and gave Marine Le Pen her highest vote percentage in the 2022 French presidential election first round. The political messaging in Mayotte attacks Comorian immigrants, not Islam.

=== Economy ===
At the end of the 1970s, Jean-Marie Le Pen broke away from the anti-capitalist heritage of Poujadism and espoused a market liberal and anti-statist programme which included lower taxes, reducing state intervention, reducing the size of the public sector, privatisation, and scaling back government bureaucracy. Some scholars have characterised the FN's 1978 programme as "Reaganite before Reagan".

The party's economic policy shifted from the 1980s to the 1990s from neoliberalism to protectionism. This occurred within the framework of a changed international environment, from a battle between the Free World and Communism, to one between nationalism and globalisation. During the 1980s, Jean-Marie Le Pen complained about the rising number of "social parasites" and called for deregulation, tax cuts, and the phasing-out of the welfare state. As the party gained growing support from the economically vulnerable, it converted towards politics of social welfare and economic protectionism. This was part of its shift away from its former claim of being the "social, popular, and national right" to its claim of being "neither right nor left – French!" Increasingly, the party's program became an amalgam of free market and welfare policies. By the 2010s, some political commentators described its economic policies as left-wing.

Under Marine Le Pen, the RN has supported economic nationalism, which it calls "economic patriotism", and it has advocated populist policies, such as tax cuts for people under 30 years old, and cuts in the value-added tax on energy and essential products. The party has supported public services, protectionism, and economic intervention and opposed the increase in the fuel tax in 2018 and the increase in the retirement age in 2023.

Under Jordan Bardella, the RN has adopted more pro-market policies, including lower taxes and simplifying industrial norms. Bardella advocated an audit of public finances as a precursor to determining the 2025 budget. Bardella has sought to use these policies to court business support during the 2024 French legislative election campaign. During this time, Bardella also rescinded the prior RN pledge to repeal the 2023 French pension reform law. Bardella has been described as advocating economic liberalism, putting him in conflict with the economic vision of Marine Le Pen.

=== Climate ===
Le Pen does not plan to withdraw from the Paris Climate Agreement but has stated that climate change is "not the priority" of the party. The party is against measures to tackle climate change and protecting the environment. The National Rally has proposed abolition of the European Green Deal, highlighting key policies it opposes such as the 2035 ban on fossil fuel cars.

=== Foreign policy ===
From the 1980s to the 1990s, the party's policy shifted from favouring the European Union to turning against it. In 2002, Jean-Marie Le Pen campaigned on pulling France out of the EU and re-introducing the franc as the country's national currency. In the early 2000s, the party denounced the Schengen, Maastricht, and Amsterdam treaties as foundations for "a supranational entity spelling the end of France." In 2004, the party criticised the EU as "the last stage on the road to world government", likening it to a "puppet of the New World Order." It also proposed breaking all institutional ties back to the Treaty of Rome while it returned to supporting a common European currency to rival the United States dollar. Further, it rejected the possible accession of Turkey to the EU. The FN was also one of several parties that backed France's 2005 rejection of the Treaty for a European Constitution. In other issues, Le Pen opposed the invasions of Iraq, led by the United States, both in the 1991 Gulf War and the 2003 Iraq War. He visited Saddam Hussein in Baghdad in 1990 and subsequently considered him a friend.

Marine Le Pen advocated France leaving the euro, although that policy was dropped in 2019. She also intends to reintroduce customs borders and has campaigned against allowing dual citizenship. During both the 2010–2011 Ivorian crisis and the 2011 Libyan civil war, she opposed the French military involvements. However, the party supported the 2013 Operation Serval in Mali against Islamist militants in the country because it was at the request of the Malian government.

Le Pen has praised Egyptian President Abdel Fattah El-Sisi for "fighting radical Islam", stating that Egypt's "ability to separate extremist Islam from the religion sets an example to the rest of the world, including France, of how to deal with poisonous ideologies". The party has also favourably contrasted the United Arab Emirates's opposition to Islamism with the more pro-Islamist position taken by Qatar. The party has advocated closer France–Morocco relations, criticising Macron's attempts to deepen ties with Algeria. In January 2023, the National Rally was one of only four parties in the European Parliament that voted against a resolution condemning Morocco's treatment of journalist Omar Radi. It praised the 2024 recognition of Moroccan sovereignty over the Western Sahara and suggested the French government should have acted sooner.

Le Pen supports the restoration of France-Syria relations and called for cooperation with Israel, the United States, Russia, Iran, and Saudi Arabia to support the economic recovery of Lebanon from the Lebanese economic crisis.

The party supports a two-state solution to the Israel-Palestine conflict and welcomed the Abraham Accords. The party has shifted towards more pro-Israel policies over time, particularly following the Gaza war. Bardella has expressed opposition to recognition of Palestinian statehood following the 2023 Hamas-led attack on Israel, on the grounds that this would be "recognising terrorism". Following the 2024 Israeli invasion of Lebanon, Le Pen suggested that a ceasefire would be impossible without the "dismantling" of Hezbollah. Following the June 2025 Israeli strikes on Iran, Bardella called for France to "stand alongside Israel" and claimed that Iran acquiring nuclear weapons would threaten world peace, while suggesting that France's role was to promote "peace and de-escalation". The National Rally welcomed the subsequent 2025 United States strikes on Iranian nuclear sites, but noted that strikes on Iran should be exclusively targeted at nuclear sites.

==== Russia and Ukraine ====
In 2015, Marine Le Pen described Russian President Vladimir Putin as a "defender of the Christian heritage of European civilisation." The National Front considers that Ukraine has been subjugated by the United States, through the Revolution of Dignity. The National Front denounces anti-Russian feelings in Eastern Europe and the submission of Western Europe to "Washington's" interests in the region. Marine Le Pen is very critical against the threats of sanctions directed by the international community against Russia: "European countries should seek a solution through diplomacy rather than making threats that could lead to an escalation." She argues that the United States is leading a new Cold War against Russia. She sees no other solution for peace in Ukraine than to organise a kind of federation that would allow each region a large degree of autonomy. She thinks Ukraine should be sovereign and free as any other nation.

Luke Harding wrote in The Guardian that the National Front's MEPs were a "pro-Russian bloc." In 2014, the Nouvel Observateur said that the Russian government considered the National Front "capable of seizing power in France and changing the course of European history in Moscow's favour." According to the French media, party leaders had frequent contact with Russian ambassador Alexander Orlov and Marine Le Pen made multiple trips to Moscow. In May 2015, one of her advisers, Emmanuel Leroy, attended an event in Donetsk marking the "independence" of the self-proclaimed Donetsk People's Republic.

The RN remains divided on relations with Russia, with Bardella stating that he believed Russia threatened French security. At the same time, Thierry Mariani suggested it was not a threat to France or Europe. The more pro-Russian Mariani has been described as in conflict with Pierre-Romain Thionnet, who has advocated a more pro-Ukrainian line, with Bardella maintaining a balance between the two positions.

During the 2022 French presidential election, Le Pen supported sending non-lethal defensive aid to Ukraine in the Russo-Ukrainian War, but not heavy weapons that would make France a "co-belligerent" in the conflict. Similarly, Bardella has expressed support for defense equipment, ammunition, and logistical assistance to Ukraine but maintains opposition to giving long-range missiles to Ukraine or deploying French soldiers there. He is also opposed to Ukrainian NATO membership, suggesting it could escalate the war.

==== European Union ====
Since their entry into the European Parliament in 1979, the National Rally has promoted a message of being pro-Europe but anti-EU. However, in 2019, the proposal that France leave the Eurozone and the EU was removed from the party's manifesto, which has since called for "reform from within" of the union. The party advocates that EU legislation should be initiated by the Council of the EU rather than the European Commission, and that French laws should have primacy over EU laws.

==== NATO ====
The party's stance on NATO has varied throughout the years. Under Jean-Marie Le Pen's leadership, the party advocated a complete withdrawal from the organization, while under Marine Le Pen's leadership, the party has softened its stance to advocate leaving NATO's integrated military command structure, which France joined in 2009. Jordan Bardella later added that the RN would not advocate withdrawing France from the integrated command while the Russian invasion of Ukraine was ongoing.

=== Electoral reform and referendums ===
The National Rally has advocated for full proportional representation in France, claiming that the two-round system disenfranchises voters. In early 2021, Marine Le Pen, along with centrist politician François Bayrou and green politician Julien Bayou, cosigned a letter asking President Emmanuel Macron to implement proportional representation for future elections.

The party advocates referendums on key issues such as the death penalty, immigration policy, and constitutional change. In 2022, Marine Le Pen stated: "I want the referendum to become a classic operating tool."

=== Past remarks on the Holocaust and relations with Jewish groups ===
There has been a difference between Marine Le Pen's and her father's opinions concerning the Holocaust and Jews. In 2005, Jean-Marie Le Pen wrote in the far-right weekly magazine Rivarol that the German occupation of France "was not particularly inhumane, even if there were a few blunders, inevitable in a country of 640,000 square kilometres (250,000 sq. mi.)" and in 1987 referred to the Nazi gas chambers as "a point of detail of the history of the Second World War". He has repeated the latter claim several times. In 2004, Bruno Gollnisch said: "I do not question the existence of concentration camps, but historians could discuss the number of deaths. As to the existence of gas chambers, it is up to historians to determine". Jean-Marie Le Pen was fined for these remarks, but Gollnisch was found not guilty by the Court of Cassation. The leader of the party, Marine Le Pen, distanced herself for a time from the party machine in protest at her father's comments. In response to her father's remarks, Marine Le Pen referred to the Holocaust as the "abomination of abominations".

During the 2012 presidential election, Marine Le Pen sought the support of Jewish people in France. Interviewed by the Israeli daily newspaper Haaretz about the fact that some of her European senior colleagues had formed alliances with, and visited, some Israeli settlers and groups, Marine Le Pen said:

The shared concern about radical Islam explains the relationship ... but it is possible that behind it is also the need of the visitors from Europe to change their image in their countries ... As far as their partners in Israel are concerned, I myself don't understand the idea of continuing to develop the settlements. I consider it a political mistake and would like to make it clear in this context that we must have the right to criticise the policy of the State of Israel – just as we are allowed to criticise any sovereign country – without it being considered anti-Semitism. After all, the National Front has always been Zionistic and always defended Israel's right to exist.

She has opposed the emigration of French Jews to Israel in response to radical Islam, explaining: "The Jews of France are Frenchmen, they're at home here, and they must stay here and not emigrate. The country is obligated to provide solutions against the development of radical Islam in problematic areas".

== Finances ==
=== Czecho-Russian bank loan ===
In November 2014, Marine Le Pen confirmed that the party had received a €9 million loan from the First Czech Russian Bank (FCRB) in Moscow to the National Front. Senior FN officials from the party's political bureau informed Mediapart that this was the first instalment of a €40 million loan, although Marine Le Pen has disputed this. The Independent said the loans "take Moscow's attempt to influence the internal politics of the EU to a new level". Reinhard Bütikofer stated, "It's remarkable that a political party from the motherland of freedom can be funded by Putin's sphere—the largest European enemy of freedom". Marine Le Pen argued that it was not a donation from the Russian government but a loan from a private Russian bank because no other bank would give her a loan. This loan is meant to prepare future electoral campaigns and to be repaid progressively. Marine Le Pen has publicly disclosed all the rejection letters that French banks have sent to her concerning her loan requests. Since November 2014, she insists that if a French bank agrees to give her a loan, she would break her contract with the FCBR, but she has not received any other counter-propositions. Le Pen accused the banks of collusion with the government. In April 2015, a Russian hacker group published texts and emails between Timur Prokopenko, a member of Putin's administration, and Konstantin Rykov, a former Duma deputy with ties to France, discussing Russian financial support to the National Front in exchange for its support of Russia's annexation of Crimea, though this has not coalesced.

=== Payment of party officials with EU funds ===
In December 2023, 28 people, including Marine Le Pen and her father Jean Marie, were ordered to stand trial after they were charged with a scheme which involved paying National Rally party officials through EU funds which were earmarked for European Parliament assistants.

On 31 March 2025, 25 National Rally members (including Le Pen, 9 other former NR MEPs, and 12 assistants) were found guilty. The sentences for Le Pen and several former MEPs included bans from running for political office.

Le Pen has denied the allegations. Her appeal against both the verdict and sentence was heard at a Paris appeals court in early 2026. On July 7, the verdict was upheld, with a number of revisions and clarifications of the sentence, including the wearing of an ankle location monitor. The ruling would allow Le Pen to run for office.

== Organization ==
=== Leadership ===
The executive bureau features: Jordan Bardella (president), Steeve Briois (vice-president), Louis Aliot (vice-president), David Rachline (vice-president), Kévin Pfeffer (treasurer), Julien Sanchez (spokesperson), Gilles Pennelle (regional councilor), Edwige Diaz (deputy regional councilor), Hélène Laporte, Philippe Olivier, and Jean-Paul Garraud.

==== Presidents ====
No	President	Term start	Term end
1	Jean-Marie Le Pen	5 October 1972	15 January 2011
1	Jean-Marie Le Pen	Jean-Marie Le Pen founded the National Front for French Unity party in 1972 and contested the Presidency of France in 1974, 1988, 1995, 2002 and 2007. He served several terms as a deputy of the National Assembly of France and a Member of the European Parliament. He later served as the party's honorary president from January 2011 to August 2015. He died on 7 January 2025 at the age of 96.	
2	Marine Le Pen	15 January 2011	5 November 2022
2	Marine Le Pen	Marine Le Pen took over as the president of the party in 2011 and contested the 2012, 2017 and 2022 French presidential elections. She served as a Member of the European Parliament from 2004 to 2017 and has served as a deputy of the National Assembly of France since 2017. Under her leadership, the party was renamed National Rally in 2018.	
3	Jordan Bardella	5 November 2022; Acting since 13 September 2021	Incumbent
3	Jordan Bardella	Jordan Bardella became acting president of the party after Marine Le Pen launched her presidential campaign in September 2021. He was elected president in November 2022.	

==== Vice presidents ====
The party had five vice presidents between July 2012 and March 2018 (against three previously).

- Alain Jamet, first vice president (2011–2014)
- Louis Aliot, in charge of training and demonstrations (2011–2018)
- Marie-Christine Arnautu, in charge of social affairs (2011–2018)
- Jean-François Jalkh, in charge of elections and electoral litigations (2012–2018)
- Florian Philippot, in charge of strategy and communication (2012–2017)
- Steeve Briois, in charge of local executives and supervision (2014–2018)
- Jordan Bardella, (2019–2022)

In March 2018, the position of vice-president replaced that of General Secretary. It became a duo in June 2019:

- Louis Aliot
- David Rachline
- Steeve Briois (2018–2022)
- Hélène Laporte (2022–present)

==== General secretaries ====
The position of General Secretary was held between 1972 and 2018:

- Alain Robert (1972–1973)
- Dominique Chaboche (1973–1976)
- Victor Barthélemy (1976–1978)
- Alain Renault (1978–1980)
- Pierre Gérard (1980–1981)
- Jean-Pierre Stirbois (1981–1988)
- Carl Lang (1988–1995)
- Bruno Gollnisch (1995–2005)
- Louis Aliot (2005–2010)
- Jean-François Jalkh (2010–2011; interim period during the internal campaign)
- Steeve Briois (2011–2014)
- Nicolas Bay (2014–2017)
- Steeve Briois (2017–2018)

=== Elected representatives ===
As of February 2023, the National Rally has 88 MPs. They sit in the National Assembly as members of the National Rally group.

=== International affiliation and relations ===
==== 1980s–2000s ====
The FN has been part of several groups in the European Parliament. The first group it helped co-establish was the European Right after the 1984 election, which also consisted of the Italian Social Movement (MSI), its early inspiration, and the Greek National Political Union. Following the 1989 election, it teamed up with the German Republicans and the Belgian Vlaams Blok in a new European Right group, while the MSI left due to the Germans' arrival. As the MSI evolved into the National Alliance, it chose to distance itself from the FN.

From 1999 to 2001, the FN was a member of the Technical Group of Independents. In 2007, it was part of the short-lived Identity, Tradition, Sovereignty group. Between the mentioned groups, the party sat among the non-affiliated Non-Inscrits. It was part of the Identity and Democracy group.

It was formerly known as the Europe of Nations and Freedom group, during which time it also included the Polish Congress of the New Right, a former member of the UK Independence Party and a former member of Romania's Conservative Party. The RN has also been part of the Identity and Democracy Party (formerly the Movement for a Europe of Nations and Freedom) since 2014, which additionally includes Slovakia's We Are Family and the Bulgarian Volya Movement, which was later renamed Patriots.eu. After the 2024 European Parliament election, the National Rally joined the Patriots for Europe group with Fidesz, Vox, the Czech ANO 2011, the Portuguese Chega, the Greek Voice of Reason, Latvia First and most former ID members, with Bardella ultimately chairing the group.

During Jean-Marie Le Pen's presidency, the party has also been active in establishing extra-parliamentary confederations. During the FN's 1997 national congress, the FN established the loose Euronat group, which consisted of a variety of European right-wing parties. Having failed to cooperate in the European Parliament, Le Pen sought in the mid-1990s to initiate contacts with other far-right parties, including from non-EU countries. The FN drew most support in Central and Eastern Europe, and Le Pen visited the Turkish Welfare Party. The significant Freedom Party of Austria (FPÖ) refused to join the efforts, as Jörg Haider sought to distance himself from Le Pen, and later attempted to build a separate group. In 2009, the FN joined the Alliance of European National Movements; it left the alliance since. Along with some other European parties, the FN in 2010 visited Japan's Issuikai ("right-wing") movement and the Yasukuni Shrine.

==== 2010s ====
At a conference in 2011, the two new leaders of the FN and the FPÖ, Marine Le Pen and Heinz-Christian Strache, announced deeper cooperation between their parties. Pursuing her de-demonisation policy, in October 2011, Marine Le Pen, as new president of the National Front, joined the European Alliance for Freedom (EAF). The EAF is a pan-European sovereigntist platform founded late 2010 that is recognised by the European Parliament. The EAF has individual members linked to the Austrian Freedom Party of Heinz-Christian Strache, the UK Independence Party, and other movements such as the Sweden Democrats, Vlaams Belang (Belgian Flanders), Germany (Bürger in Wut), and Slovakia (Slovak National Party).

During her 2012 visit to the United States, Marine Le Pen met two Republican members of the U.S. House of Representatives associated with the Tea Party movement, Joe Walsh, who is known for his strong stance against Islam, which Domenic Powell argues, rises to Islamophobia and three-time presidential candidate Ron Paul, whom Le Pen complimented for his stance on the gold standard. In February 2017, two more conservative Republican Congressmen, Steve King and Dana Rohrabacher, also met with Le Pen in Paris.

The party also has ties to Steve Bannon, who served as White House Chief Strategist under President Donald Trump, and addressed an RN event in 2018.

The FN allied with the Dutch Party for Freedom (PVV) in November 2013, after years of the PVV rejecting collaboration with the FN. Similarly, in December 2013, the FN formed an alliance with Matteo Salvini, the new leader of the Lega Nord, which had previously eschewed cooperation with the FN when it was led by Umberto Bossi.

In 2014, UK Independence Party leader Nigel Farage was critical of the FN, claiming that the FN's association with "anti-Semitism and general prejudice" made it impossible for UKIP to join Le Pen's efforts for a united right-wing populist European Parliament group despite an invitation from PVV leader Wilders.

In 2017, Marine Le Pen met with and was interviewed for the British radio station LBC by Farage, who praised Le Pen and expressed support for her presidential bid. Prior to the 2019 European Parliament election, Farage's Brexit Party initially considered forming a joint group in the next European Parliament, but ultimately once again declined.

Though the FN had close contacts with Giorgia Meloni's Brothers of Italy (FdI) from 2013 onwards, the relationship between the RN and FdI became strained in 2022, after Meloni publicly declined to support Le Pen's 2022 presidential bid.

In 2023, Meloni complained to French President Emmanuel Macron after he compared her to Le Pen, while Le Pen criticised Meloni's illegal immigration policies.

However, in early 2024, Le Pen and Meloni made overtures to one another, declining to rule out future cooperation between their parties. In July 2024, Meloni praised Le Pen's alliance with Eric Ciotti and Marion Maréchal during the 2024 French legislative election, congratulated the RN on its success in the first round of the election, and expressed preference for the right-wing alliance in the second round of the election.

In addition, the party has had relations with Krasimir Karakachanov's IMRO – Bulgarian National Movement in 2014 and Nenad Popović's Serbian People's Party since 2021. The RN was critical of the decision to allow the Bulgarian Revival to join the ID Party in 2024.

Since 2018, the RN has had relations with Santiago Abascal's Vox in Spain. In 2024, Vox had Le Pen address its conference, despite Vox being a member of the European Conservatives and Reformists Group; after the election, Vox joined the RN in Patriots for Europe.

In 2019, RN MEPs participated in the first international delegation to visit India's Jammu and Kashmir following the decision by Narendra Modi's Bharatiya Janata Party government to revoke the special status of Jammu and Kashmir. The delegation was not sanctioned by the European Parliament, and consisted mostly of right-wing populist politicians including MEPs from Vox, AfD, the Northern League, Vlaams Belang, the British Brexit Party, and Poland's Law and Justice party.

==== 2020s ====
In October 2021, Le Pen met with Fidesz leader and Hungarian Prime Minister Viktor Orbán, Polish Prime Minister Mateusz Morawiecki from the Law and Justice (PiS) party, and Slovenian Democratic Party leader and Slovenian Prime Minister Janez Janša. Both PiS and Fidesz had previously rejected cooperation with Le Pen in 2019. Orbán subsequently supported Le Pen during the 2022 French presidential election. Morawiecki later expressed openness to the RN joining the European Conservatives and Reformists Group in February 2024.

Relations with the AfD deteriorated in early 2024, following Le Pen's disagreements with the AfD members' discussions over remigration and the AfD questioning French control of Mayotte. In May 2024, the RN announced it would end its alliance with the AfD in the next European Parliament term.

During the 2024 French legislative election, Israeli minister Amichai Chikli expressed support for Le Pen and the National Rally, and suggested that Likud leader and Israeli Prime Minister Benjamin Netanyahu shared his views, prompting a rebuke by President Macron. Chikli later described his relations with the RN, stating it was "natural that conservative leaders will have good relations with conservative leaders all across the globe".

During and after the 2024 United States presidential election, the National Rally distanced itself from Trump, banning its MPs from commenting on the election.

In 2024, Nigel Farage, in his capacity as the leader of Reform UK, distanced himself from the RN, describing its economic agenda as a "disaster" for France. However, in December 2025, Farage met Bardella, with Bardella advocating for a "patriotic alliance" with Reform UK and expressing support for Farage becoming the next British Prime Minister. Bardella later addressed the Reform UK conference in September 2026, where he signed a Memorandum of Understanding between the National Rally and Reform UK, pledging future cooperation on illegal migration.

After the 2026 French Senate election, National Rally won enough seats to form a group for the first time, called "National Union for Territories Group".

== Election results ==
The National Front was a marginal party in 1973, the first election it participated in, but the party made its breakthrough in the 1984 European Parliament election, where it won 11% of the vote and ten MEPs. Following this election, the party's support mostly ranged from around 10 to 15%, although it saw a drop to around 5% in some late 2000s elections. Since 2010, the party's support seems to have increased towards its former heights. The party managed to advance to the final round of the 2002 French presidential election, although it failed to attract much more support after the initial first round vote. In the late 2000s the party suffered decline in elections. Under Marine Le Pen's presidency the party has increased its vote share significantly. The National Front came first in a national election for the first time during the 2014 European elections, when it gained 24% of the vote. During the 2017 presidential election the party advanced to the second round of the election for the second time, and doubled the percentage it received in the 2002 presidential election, earning 34%. In the 2019 European elections the rebranded National Rally retained its spot as first party.

Le Pen reached the second round of the 2017 presidential election, receiving 33.9% of the votes in the run-off and losing to Emmanuel Macron. Again in the 2022 election, she lost to Macron in the run-off, receiving 41.45% of the votes. In the 2022 parliamentary elections, the National Rally achieved a significant increase in the number of its MPs in the National Assembly, from 7 to 89 seats. In June 2024, the party won the European Parliament elections in a landslide with 31.4% of the votes. This caused Macron to announce a snap election. Later that month, an RN-led right-wing coalition topped the first round of the snap French legislative election with a record 33.2% of the votes. On 7 July, the RN also won the popular vote (37.06%) in the second round of the snap election, but only won the third highest number of seats.

=== National Assembly ===
National Assembly
Election year	Leader	1st round votes	%	2nd round votes	%	Seats	+/–
1973	Jean-Marie Le Pen	108,616	0.5%	—	—	0 / 491	Steady
1978	Jean-Marie Le Pen	82,743	0.3%	—	—	0 / 491	Steady
1981	Jean-Marie Le Pen	44,414	0.2%	—	—	0 / 491	Steady
1986	Jean-Marie Le Pen	2,703,442	9.6%	—	—	35 / 573	▲35
1988	Jean-Marie Le Pen	2,359,528	9.6%	—	—	1 / 577	▼34
1993	Jean-Marie Le Pen	3,155,702	12.7%	1,168,143	5.8%	0 / 577	▼1
1997	Jean-Marie Le Pen	3,791,063	14.9%	1,435,186	5.7%	1 / 577	▲1
2002	Jean-Marie Le Pen	2,873,390	11.1%	393,205	1.9%	0 / 577	▼1
2007	Jean-Marie Le Pen	1,116,136	4.3%	17,107	0.1%	0 / 577	Steady
2012	Marine Le Pen	3,528,373	13.6%	842,684	3.7%	2 / 577	▲2
2017	Marine Le Pen	2,990,454	13.2%	1,590,858	8.8%	8 / 577	▲6
2022	Marine Le Pen	4,248,626	18.7%	3,589,465	17.3%	89 / 577	▲81
2024	Jordan Bardella	10,647,914	33.2%	10,110,079	37.1%	125 / 577	▲26

=== Presidential ===
Election year	Candidate	First round			Second round			Result
Election year	Candidate	Votes	%	Rank	Votes	%	Rank	Result
1974	Jean-Marie Le Pen	190,921	0.75	▲7th	—N/a			Lost
1981	did not participate							
1988	Jean-Marie Le Pen	4,375,894	14.39	▲4th	—N/a			Lost
1995	Jean-Marie Le Pen	4,570,838	15.00	4th	—N/a			Lost
2002	Jean-Marie Le Pen	4,804,713	16.86	▲2nd	5,525,032	17.70	▲2nd	Lost
2007	Jean-Marie Le Pen	3,834,530	10.44	▼4th	—N/a			Lost
2012	Marine Le Pen	6,421,426	17.90	▲3rd	—N/a			Lost
2017	Marine Le Pen	7,678,491	21.30	▲2nd	10,638,475	33.90	2nd	Lost
2022	Marine Le Pen	8,133,828	23.15	2nd	13,288,686	41.45	2nd	Lost

=== Regional councils ===
Regional councils
Election	Leader	1st round votes	%	2nd round votes	%	Seats	Regional presidencies	+/–	Winning party	Rank
1986	Jean-Marie Le Pen	2,654,390	9.7%	—	—	137 / 1,880	0 / 26	Steady	Union for French Democracy	4th
1992	Jean-Marie Le Pen	3,396,141	13.9%	—	—	239 / 1,880	0 / 26	▲	Rally for the Republic	3rd
1998	Jean-Marie Le Pen	3,270,118	15.3%	—	—	275 / 1,880	0 / 26	▲	Rally for the Republic	3rd
2004	Jean-Marie Le Pen	3,564,064	14.7%	3,200,194	12.4%	156 / 1,880	0 / 26	▼	Socialist Party	3rd
2010	Jean-Marie Le Pen	2,223,800	11.4%	1,943,307	9.2%	118 / 1,749	0 / 26	▼	Socialist Party	3rd
2015	Marine Le Pen	6,018,672	27.7%	6,820,147	27.1%	358 / 1,722	0 / 18	▲	The Republicans	3rd
2021	Marine Le Pen	2,743,497	18.7%	2,908,253	19.1%	252 / 1,926	0 / 18	▼	Leftist Union + Ecologists	3rd

=== European Parliament ===
European Parliament See also Elections to the European Parliament
Election	Leader	Votes	%	Seats	+/–	EP Group
1984	Jean-Marie Le Pen	2,210,334	10.95 (#4)	10 / 81	New	ER
1989	Jean-Marie Le Pen	2,129,668	11.73 (#3)	10 / 81	0	ER
1994	Jean-Marie Le Pen	2,050,086	10.52 (#5)	11 / 87	▲1	NI
1999	Jean-Marie Le Pen	1,005,113	5.70 (#8)	5 / 87	▼6	TGI
2004	Jean-Marie Le Pen	1,684,792	9.81 (#4)	7 / 78	▲2	NI
2009	Jean-Marie Le Pen	1,091,691	6.34 (#6)	3 / 74	▼4	NI
2014	Marine Le Pen	4,712,461	24.86 (#1)	24 / 74	▲21	ENF
2019	Jordan Bardella	5,286,939	23.34 (#1)	23 / 79	▼1	ID
2024 (Note: Run in a joint list with LAF.)	Jordan Bardella	7,765,936	31.50 (#1)	30 / 81	▲7	PfE

=== Congress of New Caledonia ===
Election	Votes	%	Seats
2004	6,135	6.85%	4 / 54
2009	2,591	2.68%	0 / 54
2014	2,706	2.57%	0 / 54
2019	2,707	2.46%	0 / 54

== See also ==
- Neo-nationalism
- The Radical Right in Western Europe
- Radical right (Europe)
- Republican Front (French Fifth Republic)

== Sources ==
- Camus, Jean-Yves; Lebourg, Nicolas (2017). Far-Right Politics in Europe. Harvard University Press. ISBN 9780674971530.
- Davies, Peter (2012). The National Front in France: Ideology, Discourse and Power. Routledge. ISBN 978-1-134-72530-4.
- DeClair, Edward G. (1999). Politics on the Fringe: The People, Policies, and Organization of the French National Front. Duke University. ISBN 978-0-8223-2139-2.
- Kitschelt, Herbert; McGann, Anthony J. (1997). "France: The National Front As Prototype of the New Radical Right". The Radical Right in Western Europe: A Comparative Analysis. University of Michigan. pp. 91–120. ISBN 978-0-472-08441-8.
- Shields, James (2007). The Extreme Right in France: From Pétain to Le Pen. Routledge. ISBN 978-0-415-37200-8.
