= Radicalization =

Social process by which people arrive at extreme views

Radicalization (or radicalisation) is the adoption of increasingly radical views by an individual or a group in opposition to the political, social, or religious status quo. The ideas of society at large shape the outcomes of radicalization. Radicalization can result in both violent and nonviolent action – academic literature focuses on radicalization into violent extremism (RVE) or radicalisation leading to acts of terrorism. Multiple separate pathways can promote the process of radicalization, which can be independent but are usually mutually reinforcing.

Radicalization that occurs across multiple reinforcing pathways greatly increases a group's resilience and lethality. Furthermore, by compromising a group's ability to blend in with non-radical society and to participate in a modern, national or international economy, radicalization serves as a kind of sociological trap that gives individuals no other place to go to satisfy their material and spiritual needs.

== Definitions ==
There is no universally accepted definition of radicalization. One of the difficulties with defining radicalization appears to be the importance of the context and political perspective to determine what is perceived as radicalization. A study found pinpointing the threshold for radicalization as difficult, except when involving illegal or violent behavior. Radicalization can mean different things to different people. Presented below is a list of definitions used by different governments.

=== European Union ===
The European Commission defined the term "radicalization" in the year 2005 as follows: "Violent radicalisation" is the phenomenon of people embracing opinions, views and ideas which could lead to acts of terrorism as defined in Article 1 of the Framework Decision on Combating Terrorism. The term "violent radicalisation" originated in EU policy circles and was coined after the Madrid bombing of 11 March 2004. It was not widely used in social science as a concept but it obviously refers to a process of socialisation leading to the use of violence. In an initiating report of the European Commission's Expert Group on Violent Radicalisation – based on four deepening studies – the research paradigm has been opened for further scientific research, also flanked by research grants and funding via different security research programs.

=== United Kingdom ===
The UK Home Office, MI5's parent agency, defines radicalisation as "The process by which people come to support terrorism and violent extremism and, in some cases, then join terrorist groups." The MI5 report closes by saying that no single measure will reduce radicalisation in the UK and that the only way to combat it is by targeting the at-risk vulnerable groups and trying to assimilate them into society. This may include helping young people find jobs, better integrating immigrant populations into the local culture, and effectively reintegrating ex-prisoners into society.

=== Canada ===
The Royal Canadian Mounted Police defines radicalization as "the process by which individuals—usually young people—are introduced to an overtly ideological message and belief system that encourages movement from moderate, mainstream beliefs towards extreme views." While radical thinking is by no means problematic in itself, it becomes a threat to national security when Canadian citizens or residents espouse or engage in violence or direct action as a means of promoting political, ideological or religious extremism. Sometimes referred to as "homegrown terrorism", this process of radicalization is more correctly referred to as domestic radicalization leading to terrorist violence.

=== Denmark ===
The Danish Security and Intelligence Service (PET) defines radicalization as "A process by which a person to an increasing extent accepts the use of undemocratic or violent means, including terrorism, in an attempt to reach a specific political/ideological objective."

=== UNESCO ===
In a UNESCO (United Nations Educational, Scientific and Cultural Organization) research report on the impact of the Internet and social media on youth and violent extremism, the difficulty of defining radicalization is discussed. A distinction is drawn "between a process of radicalization, a process of violent radicalization (legitimizing the adoption of violence), and acts of violence." For the purposes of the UNESCO report, radicalization is defined by these three points:

- "The individual person's search for fundamental meaning, origin and return to a root ideology;
- "The individual as part of a group's adoption of a violent form of expansion of root ideologies and related oppositionist objectives;
- "The polarization of the social space and the collective construction of a threatened ideal 'us' against 'them,' where the others are dehumanized by a process of scapegoating."

== Varieties and commonalities ==
Despite being composed of multifarious pathways that lead to different outcomes and sometimes diametrically opposed ideological purposes, radicalization can be traced to a common set of pathways that translate real or perceived grievances into increasingly extreme ideas and readiness to participate in political action beyond the status quo. Shira Fishman, a researcher at the National Consortium for the Study of Terrorism and Responses to Terrorism, wrote "Radicalization is a dynamic process that varies for each individual, but shares some underlying commonalities that can be explored." Though there are many end products of the process of radicalization, to include all manner of extremist groups both violent and nonviolent, a common series of dynamics have been consistently demonstrated in the course of academic inquiry.

=== Islamic ===
Jihadis have a "tried and tested model" of contact with different vulnerable, and extremist individuals through online messaging services or social media platforms, and then rapidly manipulating them towards participating in violent action in their name. It was reported that Raffia Hayat of the Ahmadiyya Muslim Association warned that jailed extremists attempt to recruit violent criminals into radical groups so they carry out attacks on the public once released. There have been several notable criticisms of radicalization theories for focusing disproportionately on Islam. There have been concerns that converts to Islam are more susceptible to violent radicalization than individuals born into the faith. Dr. Abdul Haqq Baker developed the Convert's Cognitive Development Framework that describes how new converts conceptualize Islam and the stages where they are most vulnerable to radicalization.

=== Right-wing ===
Radical right-wing terrorism is motivated by a variety of different right-wing/far-right ideologies, most prominently neo-fascism, neo-Nazism, white nationalism and to a lesser extent "Patriot"/Sovereign citizen beliefs and anti-abortion sentiment. Modern radical right-wing terrorism appeared in Western Europe, Central Europe and the United States in the 1970s, and Eastern Europe following the dissolution of the Soviet Union in 1991. Groups associated with right-wing radicals include white power skinhead gangs, right-wing/far-right hooligans, and sympathizers.

Examples of right-wing/far-right radical organizations and individuals include Aryan Nations, Aryan Republican Army (ARA), Atomwaffen Division (AWD), Army of God (AOG), Anders Behring Breivik, Alexandre Bissonnette, Brenton Harrison Tarrant, Cesar Sayoc, Cliven Bundy, Dylann Roof, David Koresh, David Lane, Eric Robert Rudolph, Frazier Glenn Miller, James Mason, James Alex Fields, John T. Earnest, Jim David Adkisson, Ku Klux Klan (KKK), National Action (NA), National Socialist Underground (NSU), Timothy McVeigh, Robert Bowers, Thomas Mair, The Order and Wade Michael Page. From 2008 to 2016, there were more right-wing terror attacks both attempted and accomplished in the US than Islamist and left-wing attacks combined.

Right-wing populism by those who support ethnocentrism (usually white nationalism) and oppose immigration creates a climate of "us versus them" leading to radicalization. The growth of white nationalism in a political climate of polarization has provided an opportunity for both on- and offline radicalization and recruitment as an alternative to increasingly distrusted traditional mainstream choices. In 2009, the United States Department of Homeland Security identified economic and political conditions as leading to a rise in right-wing radicalization and recruitment.

The Anti-Defamation League reports that white supremacist propaganda and recruitment efforts on and around college campuses have been increasing sharply, with 1,187 incidents in 2018 compared to 421 in 2017, far exceeding any previous year. Far-right terrorists rely on a variety of strategies such as leafleting, violent rituals, and house parties to recruit, targeting angry and marginalized youth looking for solutions to their problems. But their most effective recruitment tool is extremist music, which avoids monitoring by moderating parties such as parents and school authorities. Risk factors for recruitment include exposure to racism during childhood, dysfunctional families such as divorced parents, physical, emotional, and sexual abuse, neglect, and disillusionment.

In 2018, researchers from the Data & Society think tank identified the YouTube recommendation system as promoting a range of political positions from mainstream libertarianism and conservatism to overt white nationalism. Many other online discussion groups and forums are used for online right-wing radicalization. Facebook was found to be offering advertisements targeted to 168,000 users in a white genocide conspiracy theory category, which they removed shortly after being contacted by journalists in the wake of the 2018 Pittsburgh synagogue shooting. After the Christchurch mosque shootings on March 15, 2019, Facebook announced that they have banned white nationalist and white separatist content along with white supremacy.

=== Left-wing ===
Left-wing terrorism is terrorism committed with the aim of overthrowing current capitalist systems and replacing them with Marxist–Leninist or socialist societies. Left-wing terrorism can also occur within already socialist states as criminal action against the current ruling government. Most left-wing terrorist groups that had operated in the 1970s and 1980s disappeared by the mid-1990s. One exception was the Greek Revolutionary Organization 17 November (17N), which lasted until 2002. Since then, left-wing terrorism has been relatively minor in the Western world in comparison with other forms, and is now mostly carried out by insurgent groups in the developing world.

According to Sarah Brockhoff, Tim Krieger and Daniel Meierrieks, while left-wing terrorism is ideologically motivated, nationalist-separatist terrorism is ethnically motivated. They argue that the revolutionary goal of left-wing terrorism is non-negotiable whereas nationalist terrorists are willing to make concessions. They suggest that rigidity of the demands of left-wing terrorists may explain their lack of support relative to nationalist groups. Nevertheless, many on the revolutionary left have shown solidarity for national liberation groups employing terrorism, such as Irish nationalists, the Palestine Liberation Organization and the South American Tupamaros, seeing them as engaged in a global struggle against capitalism. Since the nationalist sentiment is fueled by socio-economic conditions, some separatist movements, including the Basque ETA, the Provisional Irish Republican Army and the Irish National Liberation Army, incorporated communist and socialist ideology into their policies.

=== Role of the Internet and social media ===
UNESCO explored the role of the Internet and social media on the development of radicalization among youth in a 2017 research report, Youth and violent extremism on social media: mapping the research. The report explores violent extremism in the countries within Europe, North America, Latin America, and the Caribbean; violent radicalization in the Arab world and Africa; and, violent radicalization in Asia. At this time, more research is available on this issue within Europe, North America, Latin America, and the Caribbean than is available in the Arab world, Africa, and Asia. The report expresses a need for continued research on this topic overall as there are multiple types of radicalization (political, religious, psychosocial) that can be explored in relation to youth and the role the Internet and social media play. Some theorists like Pariser (2011) suggest that with the rise of personalisation on the web through filters and algorithms, consumers are increasingly becoming isolated in ‘filter bubbles’ which limit and determine what we are exposed to online, meaning that familiarity in information is favoured and personal beliefs are reinforced. However, research is mixed on whether polarisation and filter bubbles cause radicalization, with one key conclusion of the UNESCO report suggesting that “social media constitutes a facilitating environment rather than a driving force for violent radicalization or the actual commission of violence."

As stated before the authors of the 2017 UNESCO report repeatedly call for the support of more research into the study of online violent radicalization. Especially as it relates to young people and women as available research has been gendered. Online radicalization of women towards misandry has been found. Gaps in research also apply to specific areas of the world. There is a notable absence of research on this topic when it comes to the Arab world, Africa, and Asia. So much so, that the authors of this report had difficulty developing specific conclusions about the connections between the Internet and social media, radicalization, and youth in these three areas of the world. The authors see these multiple gaps in research as opportunities for future studies, but also admit that there are specific challenges in carrying out research in this area successfully. They discuss empirical, methodological, and ethical challenges. For example, if youth and the influence of the Internet and social media on radicalizing them are to be studied, there are ethical concerns when it comes to the age of the youth being studied as well as the privacy and safety of these youth. The authors conclude their report with general recommendations as well as recommendations for government entities, the private sector, and civil society.

==== Algorithmic radicalization ====
Algorithmic radicalization is the concept that recommender algorithms on popular social media sites, such as YouTube and Facebook, drive users toward progressively more extreme content over time, leading to the development of radicalized extremist political views. Algorithms track user interactions, such as likes, dislikes, and watch time, to generate a continuous stream of content intended to maximize engagement. Echo chamber channels have been described as contributing to increased polarization largely through reinforcing media preferences and validating existing beliefs, though this effect is often discussed in general commentary rather than established through rigorous empirical research.

Algorithmic radicalization remains a controversial phenomenon as it is often not in the best interest of social media companies to remove echo chamber channels. To what extent recommender algorithms are actually responsible for radicalization remains disputed. Studies have found contradictory results regarding the promotion of extremist content by algorithms.

== Mutual aid ==
Eli Berman's 2009 book Radical, Religious, and Violent: the New Economics of Terrorism applies a rational choice model to the process of radicalization, demonstrating that the presence of mutual aid networks increase the resilience of radical groups. When those groups decide to use violence, they also enjoy a heightened level of lethality and are protected from defection and other forms of intervention by states and outside groups.

All organizations insofar as they include the possibility of free riders by extension experience defection constraints. Within the context of a violent extremist organization, defection means either defection to a counterintelligence or security apparatus, or defection to a non-radical criminal apparatus. Both of these outcomes spoil specific plans to exercise violence in the name of the group at large. The "defection constraint" is similar to a threshold price-point in that it denotes what rewards would justify the defection of any one individual within the context of an organization. Berman uses the example of a Taliban protection racket for convoys of consumer goods moving through Afghanistan: checkpoints are set up at several points along a trade route, and each checkpoint's team is given a small percentage of the convoy's total value if it arrives safely at its destination. The incentive for any one checkpoint's team deciding to simply hijack a convoy as it passes through, sell the goods off, and escape, increases as the value of the convoy increases. The same dynamic applies to attacks; while an individual in a terrorist group may not feel drawn by the reward of alerting the police to an impending low level crime, the reward for alerting the police to an impending high-profile attack, such as a mass bombing, becomes more attractive. While non-radicalized and criminal organizations can only rely on organizational cohesion through a calculus of greed, fear, and perhaps familial loyalty, Berman argues that religious radicalization greatly increases the defection constraints of radical terrorist organizations by requiring outsized demonstrations of commitment to the cause prior to recruiting operatives.

Mutual aid is the voluntary and reciprocal exchange of goods within an organization. Examples in various religious antecedents include Judaic Tzedakah, Islamic Zakat, and various Christian institutions of charity, as described in the Acts of the Apostles. Berman argues that religious organizations experience economic risks by extending mutual aid to all alleged believers—theological assent is cheap, action can be costly. By imposing a series of outwardly visible social rules, such as restrictions (or prescriptions) on dress, diet, language, and social interactions, groups impose a cost on entering into a mutual aid partnership, diminishing the occurrence of free riding.

These restrictions have a dual effect in radical groups. Not only do they ensure that an individual is committed to the cause, but they also diminish individual's access to consumption opportunities and social interaction that might persuade them to distance themselves from the cause. As individuals become more involved with radical activities, their social circles become more constrained, which diminishes contact with non-radicalized persons and further entrenches radicalized thinking. For example, when a young man spends several years in a Yeshiva in order to establish himself within a Haredi community, he foregoes future earnings that would be accessible should he choose a secular education. To quote Berman "As consumption opportunities are limited, work for pay becomes less appealing, freeing up even more time for community activities." This sunk cost figures into future calculations, and raises the defection constraint in a way that non-radicalized group dynamics cannot. Going back to the Taliban convoy example, not only have the two footsoldiers in question have been vetted by demonstrating commitment to the cause, they also have had their exterior options limited such that it would be difficult to blend into a new environment for lack of skills and cultural understanding. As such, the threshold price point to defect, as represented by the value of the convoy, increases to include both the price of losing their existing support network and non-quantifiable factors such as friends, family, safety, and other goods over the course of their lives.

== Leading theories ==
While the overall arch of radicalization usually involves multiple reinforcing processes, scholars have identified a series of individual pathways to radicalization.

=== McCauley and Mosalenko ===
Clark McCauley and Sofia Mosalenko's 2009 book Friction: How Radicalization Happens to Them and Us identifies 12 following sociological and psychodynamic pathways:

==== Individual-level factors ====
===== Personal grievance =====
This pathway emphasizes revenge for real or perceived harm inflicted upon oneself by an outside party. This initial offense triggers other psychodynamic mechanisms, such as thinking in more stark in-group and out-group terms, lowered inhibitions to violence, and lessened incentives to avoid violence. Chechen "Shahidka" also known as Black Widows, women who have lost husbands, children, or other close family members in conflict with Russian forces are a good example.

===== Group grievance =====
"Group grievance" radicalization dynamics are similar to those that are primed by personal grievances; the difference is that the subject perceives harm inflicted on a group that she belongs to or has sympathy for. This pathway accounts for the larger portion of political and ethnic radical violence, in which action is taken on behalf of the group at large rather than as an act of personal revenge. Radicalization out of sympathy for an outgroup is rarer, but can be observed in the Weather Underground's attempted alignment with the Black Panthers and Viet Cong. The tie between radicalization into violent extremism through group grievance and suicide bombing has also been quantifiably demonstrated: perceived threats to proximal identity such as the presence of foreign troops or invasion accounts for the majority of suicide bombings.

Some commentators believe that the anger and suspicion directed toward innocent Muslims living in Western countries after the September 11 attacks and the indignities inflicted upon them by security forces and the general public contributes to radicalization of new recruits. Such "us vs. them" hostility cited by commentators includes political positions such as the Trump travel ban which Donald Trump initially campaigned for as "a total and complete shutdown of Muslims entering the United States", or ironically Senator Ted Cruz's call to "patrol and secure Muslim neighborhoods before they become radicalized".

===== Slippery slope =====
The "Slippery slope" represents gradual radicalization through activities that incrementally narrow the individual's social circle, narrow their mindset, and in some cases desensitize them to violence. This has also been called the "True Believer" syndrome, as a product of which one becomes increasingly serious about their political, social, and religious beliefs as a product of "taking the next step". One can begin by participating in nonviolent activities such as mutual aid, wherein the best way to raise one's in-group social status is to demonstrate seriousness about the cause and increase the level of commitment in terms of beliefs and activities. As an individual commits act after act, sunk costs are developed. Even if activity is initially only ideological or only criminal, the process of radicalization equates the two such that criminal acts are justified for intellectually radical purposes, and radical purposes are invoked to justify what are ultimately criminal acts.

===== Love =====
Romantic and familial entanglement is often an overlooked factor in radicalization. Several violent extremist organizations, especially at their origin, owe their structure to a tight-knit group of friends who share religious, economic, social, and sexual bonds. While this example is evident in more extreme cases, such as those of Charles Manson's "Family" and other radical cults, it also applies to radicalization in secular and orthodox religious environments. Love can serve as a connection between influential figures, connecting their networks of followers through a combination of attraction and loyalty. This particular force was especially notable in New Left radical groups, such as the American Weather Underground and the German Red Army Faction. The connections between Bill Ayers and Bernardine Dohrn, or between Gudrun Ensslin and Andreas Baader served as the organizational and intellectual nucleus of these groups.

===== Risk and status =====
Within a radical group, high-risk behavior, if successful, offers a pathway to status insofar as it becomes re-construed as bravery and commitment to the cause. As such, violence or other radical activity provides a pathway to success, social acceptance, and physical rewards that might otherwise be out of reach.

Disproportionate involvement in risk taking and status seeking is particularly true of those young men who come from disadvantaged family backgrounds, have lower IQ levels, are of lower socioeconomic status, and who therefore have less opportunity to succeed in society along a traditional career path. These young men are more likely to be involved in gang activity, violent crime, and other high-risk behavior.

James Pugel conducted a study in which Liberian ex-combatants indicated that their radicalization was motivated by the opportunity to increase their economic and social status within their community. There was a belief that radicalized individuals lived better than non-radicalized individuals. Specifically, extremists groups offered compensatory employment, which provided the means for basic needs to be met such as food and housing. In addition, radicalization provided protection and safety from local violence (i.e. abductions) for their entire family. Other researchers such as Alpaslan Ozerdem and Sukanya Podder contend that radicalization "can become the only route to survival, offering protection from torture, abuse, and politically instigated killing." Furthermore, individuals that do not join radical groups may be subjected to an indefinite "insufferable social burden that included demeaning names and labels".

===== Unfreezing =====
Loss of social connection can open an individual to new ideas and a new identity that may include political radicalization. Isolated from friends, family, or other basic needs, individuals may begin to associate with unlike parties, to include political, religious, or cultural radicals. This is especially noted in prison radicalization, where individuals bind together over racial, religious, and gang identity to a greater degree than in the outside world and often bring their newfound radical identity beyond prison to connect with radical organizations in the populace at large.

==== Group-level factors ====
Insofar as a group is a dynamic system with a common goal or set of values it is possible that the group's mindset as a whole can affect individuals such that those individuals become more radical. An ideologically aligned milieu can encourage or constrain radicalization.

===== Polarization =====
Discussion, interaction, and experience within a radical group can result in an aggregate increase in commitment to the cause, and in some cases can contribute to the formation of divergent conceptions of the group's purpose and preferred tactics. Within a radical group, internal dynamics can contribute to the formation of different factions as a result of internal disillusionment (or, conversely, ambitions) with the group's activities as a whole, especially when it comes to a choice between violent terrorism and nonviolent activism. The Weather Underground's split with Students for a Democratic Society is one of many examples. The dynamics of group polarization imply that members of this larger group must either commit to one faction and demonstrate their loyalty through further radicalization, or leave the group entirely.

===== Isolation =====
Isolation reinforces the influence of radical thinking by allowing serious and or persuasive members of the group to disproportionately define the body's agenda. When an individual only has access to one in-group social environment, that group gains a totalizing influence over the individual—disapproval would be tantamount to social death, personal isolation, and often a lack of access to the basic services that mutual aid communities fulfill. As an isolated minority, Islamic groups in the West are especially vulnerable to this form of radicalization. Being cut off from society at large through language barriers, cultural difference, and occasionally discriminatory treatment, Muslim communities become more vulnerable to additional pathways of radicalization.

One such additional pathway of radicalization of individuals that feel isolated is the Internet. Utilizing data compiled by the Internet World Stats, Robin Thompson contends that the rate of Middle East and North African Internet usage is "above average" in comparison to other countries, yet in countries where Internet availability is more widespread, individuals are "more likely to be recruited and radicalized via the Internet." Hence, the Internet, specifically social media sites such as extremists' chat rooms and blogs, "lures its users with a promise of friendship, acceptance, or a sense of purpose."

===== Competition =====
Groups can become radicalized vis-a-vis other groups as they compete for legitimacy and prestige with the general populace. This pathway emphasizes increased radicalization in an effort to outdo other groups, whether that increase is in violence, time spent in religious ritual, economic and physical hardship endured, or all four. Religious movements and the terrorist elements that form in their name display this characteristic. While in some cases there may be doctrinal or ethnic differences that motivate this kind of competition, its greatest outward sign is an increased demand by the group for commitment to radical actions.

==== Mass radicalization ====
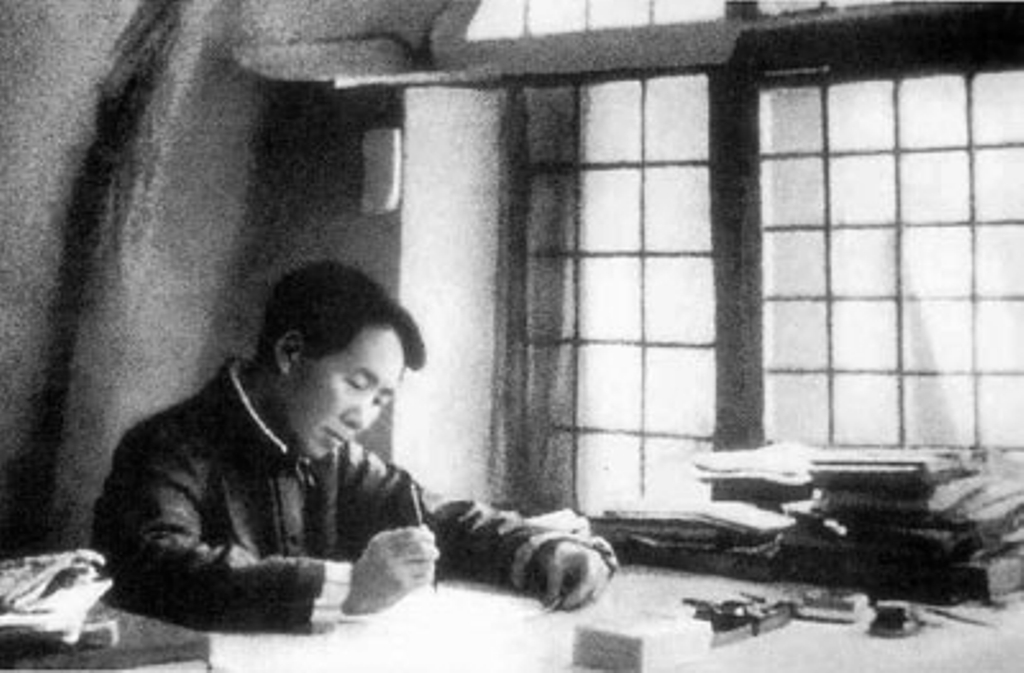
Chairman Mao Zedong writing On Protracted War in 1938

===== Jiujitsu politics =====
Also called "the logic of political violence", Jiujitsu politics is a form of asymmetrical political warfare in which radical groups act to provoke governments to crack down on the populace at large and produce domestic blowback that legitimates further violent action. The primary purpose of a radical group using this tactic is not to destroy the enemy outright, but to make the enemy strike at political and ideological moderates, such that the existing political order loses its claim on legitimacy while the radical group gains legitimacy. By destroying moderates, radical groups encourage a bifurcated society and use state's reactions to violence as a justification for further violence.

Al-Qaeda's strategy of luring the West, specifically the United States, into ground wars in Islamic states that polarize the Ummah against the West while avoiding engagements that would allow the American military to draw on its technical superiority is an example of jiujitsu politics. David Kilcullen, Counterinsurgency advisor to David Petraeus during the Iraq Surge, has called this the "accidental guerrilla syndrome". This tactic is also pillar of Maoist insurgency and serves both the purposes of tactical and ideological advantage.

===== Hatred =====
In protracted conflicts the enemy is increasingly seen as less human, such that their common humanity does not readily trigger natural inhibitions against violence. This involves "essentializing" both the self and enemies as respectively good and evil entities. The Islamist use of Takfirism, or (apostasy), to justify the murder of non-radical Muslims and nonbelievers (kafir: "pagans") is an example of this. Hannah Arendt, in The Origins of Totalitarianism outlines a similar dynamic that contributed to the ideologies of pan-slavism, Nazism, and antisemitism, where an in-group constructs an exalted self identity for political purposes and mobilizes against out-groups in order to solidify that identity. This dynamic of hatred is not unique to rightist groups. The Weather Underground Organization and Red Army Faction often characterized police officers and government officials as "pigs" worthy of death and subhuman treatment.

===== Martyrdom =====
Martyrdom implies that the person in question died for a cause or is willing to die for a cause. The symbolic impact of martyrdom varies across cultures, but within the field of radicalization the act or pursuit of martyrdom denotes the absolute value of a radical's way of life.

=== Barrett ===
Robert Barrett is one of the leading researchers in field research with Nigerian terrorist groups. Barrett contributes a unique perspective to this type of research because his studies are conducted with current, not former, members of insurgent groups. Barrett's 2008 field research study revealed unique typologies and motivations for radicalization as reported by insurgent groups. For instance, individuals that were radicalized expressed sentiments of volunteerism, yet extremist recruiters conveyed that their objective was to make "coercion feel like volunteerism." Barrett asserted that the motivations to become radicalized can be characterized as: ideologue, combatant, criminals, pragmatist, soldier, and follower.

==== Ideologues ====
Ideologues uphold a belief that ethnic supremacy is necessary and violence was the means to achieve this truth. Ideologues maintain a "readiness to die for the ethnic group if necessary; survival and preservation of the group or community is more important than survival or preservation of oneself".

==== Combatants ====
Combatants' express concerns that their basic survival depends on joining extremist groups. Hence, combatants are not motivated by ideologies and their primary objective is self-preservation.

==== Criminals ====
Criminals are predominantly motivated by their "freedom to carry out activities that would otherwise be deemed illegal". As such, criminals thrive on instant self-gratification of engaging in violent acts against their enemies. Criminals thrive on conflict and in a sense believe their actions are heroic.

==== Pragmatists ====
Pragmatists are interested in the benefits of economic and social status mobility. Their goals are in "preserving the structures and environment conducive to either continued success or to newfound success" in wealth, land ownership, and/or mining rights.

==== Soldiers ====
Soldiers believe "injustice and insecurity" are mitigating factors for radicalization. Prominent feelings that they have a duty to fight against injustices. Soldiers are motivated by a sense that they can instrumentally affect positive change. Followers desire a sense of group dependence and attachment to overcome feelings of being an outsider. They are overwhelmingly concerned with social perception. "Ensuring one's acceptance and preserving or enhancing one's social status within the community was the most important factor promoting membership".

== Misconceptions ==
=== Poverty ===
The association between radicalization and poverty is a myth. Many terrorists come from middle-class backgrounds and have university-level educations, particularly in the technical sciences and engineering. There is no statistical association between poverty and militant radicalization. As outlined above, poverty and disadvantage may incentivize joining a mutual aid organization with radical tendencies, but this does not mean that poverty proper is responsible for radicalization.

=== Mental illness ===
Though personal psychology does play a significant part in radicalization, mental illness is not a root cause of terrorism specifically or ideological radicalization broadly. Even in the case of suicide terrorism, psychological pathologies, such as depression and schizophrenia are largely absent. In the case of lone wolf terrorism rather than group terrorism, the case is less clear. Compared to the general population, lone wolf terrorists are significantly more likely to have been diagnosed with a mental illness, although it is not an accurate profiler. Studies have found that roughly a third of lone wolf terrorists have been diagnosed at some point in their life with a mental illness. This puts lone wolves as being 13.5 times more likely to suffer from a mental illness than a member of an organized terrorist group, such as al-Qaeda or ISIS.

== Prevention and de-radicalization ==
Deradicalization is the process of prevention and stigmatisation of utilizing violence.

== See also ==
- By any means necessary
- Clandestine cell system
- Cumulative radicalization
- Dehumanization
- Diversity of tactics
- Empowering Local Partners to Prevent Violent Extremism in the United States
- Flanderization
- International Centre for the Study of Radicalisation and Political Violence
- Islamic extremism in the United States
- Lone wolf terrorism
- Martyrdom video
- Memory erasure
- Moderation theory
- Nonviolent extremism
- Online youth radicalization
- Radical politics
- Ten stages of genocide
- Violent Radicalization and Homegrown Terrorism Prevention Act of 2007

== Sources ==
- This article incorporates text from a free content work. Licensed under CC BY-SA 3.0 IGO. Text taken from Youth and violent extremism on social media: mapping the research, 1–167, Alava, Séraphin, Divina Frau-Meigs, and Ghayada Hassan, UNESCO. UNESCO Digital Library.
