= Online youth radicalization =

Online youth radicalization is the action in which a young individual or a group of people come to adopt increasingly extreme political, social, or religious ideals and aspirations that reject, or undermine the status quo or undermine contemporary ideas and expressions of a state, which they may or may not reside in. Online youth radicalization can be both violent or non-violent.

The phenomenon, often referred to as "incitement to radicalization towards violent extremism" (or "violent radicalization") has grown in recent years, due to the Internet and social media in particular. In response to the increased attention on online "incitement to extremism and violence", attempts to prevent this phenomenon have created challenges for freedom of expression. These range from indiscriminate blocking, censorship over-reach (affecting both journalists and bloggers), and privacy intrusions—right through to the suppression or instrumentalization of media at the expense of independent credibility.

The article also explores how online radicalization can involve misogynistic and gender-based ideologies, particularly targeting young men through social media algorithms and influencers who promote harmful views under the guise of self-improvement. After terrorist attacks, political pressure is often put on social media companies to do more to prevent online radicalization of young people leading to violent extremism. UNESCO calls for "a policy that is constructed on the basis of facts and evidence, and not founded on hunches—or driven by panic and fearmongering."

Cyberspace is used to denote the Internet, as a network of networks, and social media as a social network that may combine various Internet platforms and applications to exchange and publish online: the online production of radical (political, social, religious) resources or content, the presence of terrorist or radicalized groups within the social networks, and the participation of young people in radical conversations.

== Definitions and approaches ==
Radicalization refers to the processes by which individuals or groups come to adopt beliefs that challenge or reject established political, social, or religious norms. In some cases, these beliefs may be used to justify participation in or support for acts of violence, often framed as necessary or morally justified actions in pursuit of ideological or political goals. Definitions of radicalization vary across academic, governmental, and policy contexts; however, most characterize it as a gradual or staged progression.

In the context of online radicalization, the term youth typically refers to individuals in adolescence or early adulthood. The exact age range for youth in this context varies depending on the source. The United Nations refers to youth as individuals between the ages of 15-24 years old, primarily for statistical purposes. Other sources, including academic research and governmental policies, may extend this age range up to 29 years old to account for ongoing social, cognitive and emotional developmental milestones. Youth radicalization is often considered a distinct category due to these developmental factors that may increase young people's vulnerability to radical ideologies and recruitment strategies, especially in the online environment.

== Algorithmic radicalization ==
Algorithmic radicalization is the concept that recommender algorithms on popular social media sites, such as YouTube and Facebook, drive users toward progressively more extreme content over time, leading to the development of radicalized extremist political views. Algorithms meticulously record user interactions, encompassing likes, dislikes and the duration of time watching content, with the objective of generating an endless stream of media designed to sustain user engagement. The phenomenon of echo chamber channels has been demonstrated to exacerbate the polarization of consumers, primarily through the reinforcement of media preferences and the validation of one's existing beliefs.

Algorithmic radicalization remains a controversial phenomenon as it is often not in the best interest of social media companies to remove echo chamber channels. To what extent recommender algorithms are actually responsible for radicalization remains disputed. Studies have found contradictory results regarding the promotion of extremist content by algorithms.

== Youth and violent extremism ==
=== Specificities of social media ===
The Internet has remained a medium for the spread of narratives. It has often been mistaken as a driver of violent extremism rather than the medium that it is. Unfortunately, social media has not only been used to bring people closer, to share thoughts and opinions, but also to spread false information. Additionally, the application of privacy rules has made it easier for closing the niche and advancing the targeting of vulnerable individuals. These privacy rules though welcomed, have made the process of analysis for prevention; challenging.

==== Chatrooms ====
Chatrooms can be embedded within most Internet-based media. Reports that have looked into the use of chatrooms by violent extremist groups describe these as the space where at-risk youth without previous exposure would be likely to come across radicalizing religious narratives. This falls in line with Sageman's emphasis on the role of chatrooms and forums, based on his distinction between websites as passive sources of news and chat rooms as active sources of interaction. According to Sageman, "networking is facilitated by discussion forums because they develop communication among followers of the same ideas (experiences, ideas, values), reinforce interpersonal relationships and provide information about actions (tactics, objectives, tutorials)". Chatrooms can also include spaces where extremist people share information such as photos, videos, guides, and manuals. Discussion forums such as Reddit, 4chan, and 8chan have become focal points on internet meme-based and other forms of radicalization.

==== Facebook ====
Many extremist groups are ideologically and strategically anti-Facebook, but a strong presence still exists on this platform either directly or through supporters. Facebook does not seem to be used for direct recruitment or planning, possibly because it has mechanisms of tracking and can link users with real places and specific times. Facebook appears to have been more often used by extremists as a decentralized center for the distribution of information and videos or a way to find like-minded supporters and show support rather than direct recruitment. This may be on the possibility that young sympathizers can share information and images and create Facebook groups in a decentralized way.

The terrorist perpetrator of the Christchurch mosque shootings live-streamed, on Facebook, a video of the attacks which resulted in the deaths of 51 people; this was then extensively shared on social media. In the wake of this tragedy, Facebook and Twitter became more active in banning extremists from their platforms. Facebook pages associated with Future Now Australia have been removed from the platform, including their main page, "Stop the Mosques and Save Australia." On March 28, Facebook announced that they have banned white nationalist and white separatist content along with white supremacy.

==== Twitter ====
Micro-blogging sites like Twitter present more advantages for extremist groups because traceability of the identity and the source of the tweets are harder to achieve, thus increasing the communication potential for recruiters. Analyses of Twitter feeds generated by Islamist violent extremist groups show that they are mostly used for engaging with the opposition and the authorities, in what appear to be tweetclashes that mobilize the two sides, and also used for provocation. Through Twitter, extremists can easily comment publicly on international events or personalities in several languages, enabling the activists to be vocal and timely when mounting campaigns.

==== YouTube and other video platforms ====
YouTube has the advantage of being difficult to trace the identity of people posting content, while offering the possibility for users to generate comments and share contents. Several researchers have conducted content analyses of YouTube and Facebook extremist discourses and video contents to identify the production features most used, including their modus operandi and intended effects. Studies that have focused on the rhetorical strategy of extremist groups show the multifaceted use of online resources by extremist groups—that is, they produce "hypermedia seduction" via the use of visual motifs that are familiar to young people online, and they provide content in several languages, mostly Arabic, English and French using subtitles or audio dubbing, to increase the recruitment capacity of youth across nations. These videos provide rich media messaging that combines nonverbal cues and vivid images of events that can evoke psychological and emotional responses as well as violent reactions. Terrorists capture their attacks on video and disseminate them though the Internet, communicating an image of effectiveness and success. Such videos in turn are used to mobilize and recruit members and sympathizers. Videos also serve as authentication and archive, as they preserve live footage of actual damage and they validate terrorist performance acts. In 2018, researchers from the Data & Society thinktank identified the YouTube recommendation system as promoting a range of political positions from mainstream libertarianism and conservatism to overt white nationalism.

==== Video games ====
Video games can be placed in a similar category as social media because they increasingly have their own forums, chatrooms and microblogging tools. Video games, widely used by young people, are under-researched in relation to extremism and violent radicalization. There is mostly anecdotal evidence that ISIS supporters have proposed the modification of some games to spread propaganda (e.g. Grand Theft Auto V), mods that allow players to act as terrorists attacking Westerners (Arma 3), and provide for hijacking of images and titles to allude to a notion of jihad (e.g. Call of Duty).

Selepak used qualitative textual analysis of hate-based video games found on right-wing religious supremacist groups’ websites to explore the extent to which they advocate violence. The results show that most hate groups were portrayed positively, and that video games promoted extreme violence towards people represented as Black or Jewish people. The games were often modified versions of classic video games in which the original enemies were replaced with religious, racial and/or ethnic minorities. Their main purpose is to indoctrinate players with white supremacist ideology and allow those who already hold racist ideologies to practice aggressive scripts toward minorities online, which may later be acted upon offline. Some experimental social psychologists show that cumulative violent video games can increase hostile expectations and aggressive behavior.

=== Uses of Internet and social media by extremist groups ===
The Internet and social media have numerous advantages for extremist groups using religion as part of a radicalization strategy. The advantages stem from the very nature of Internet and social media channels and the way they are used by extremist groups. These include communication channels that are not bound to national jurisdictions and are informal, large, cheap, decentralized, and anonymous. This allows terrorists to network across borders and to bypass time and space. Specifically, these channels provide networks of recruiters, working horizontally in all the countries they target due to the transborder nature of the Internet.

Weinmann describes extremist groups’ use of Internet and social media in eight process strategies: "psychological warfare, publicity and propaganda, data mining, fundraising, recruitment and mobilization, networking, information sharing and planning and coordination". Conway identifies five-core terrorist uses of the Internet and social media: "information provision, financing, networking, recruitment and information gathering". The ones most relevant to social media and radicalization of young people are information provision, such as profiles of leaders, manifestos, publicity and propaganda, and recruitment. Some studies show that social media enables people to isolate themselves in an ideological niche by seeking and consuming only information consistent with their views (confirmation bias), as well as simultaneously self-identifying with geographically distant international groups, which creates a sense of community that transcends geographic borders. This ability to communicate can promote membership and identity quests faster and in more efficient ways than in the "real" social world.

While recruitment is not an instantaneous process, it is seen in the literature as a phase of radicalization, taking the process to a new level of identification and possible action. Indoctrination is easier post-recruitment and often occurs in specific virtual spaces where the extremist rhetoric is characterized by a clear distinction between "them" (described negatively) and "us" (described positively), and where violent actions are legitimized according to the principle of "no other option available". These advantages of the Internet and social media open up prospects for extremist groups, by facilitating what used to be referred previously as block recruitment and by substituting group decision to individual decision-making.

=== Reception and influence on youth ===
Bouzar, Caupenne and Sulayman (2014) present the results of interviews with 160 French families with radicalized (though not violent) children aged mainly between 15 and 21. The vast majority of the youth interviewed claimed to have been radicalized through the Internet. This held true regardless of their family characteristics and dynamics. The vast majority of the families (80%) did not follow any specific religious beliefs or practices and only 16% belonged to the working class.

In a clinical study of 20 French adolescents referred for radical conduct between 2015 and 2021, all had accessed extremist material online and 15 had been in contact with members of a terrorist organization over the internet, while only 6 had met such contacts in person.

Wojcieszak analysed cross-sectional and textual data obtained from respondents in neo-Nazi online discussion forums. The author found that "extremism increases with increased online participation, probably as a result of the informational and normative influences within the online groups". In addition, exposure to different parties/views offline that are dissimilar to the extremist group's values has in some instances reinforced radical beliefs online.

Many authors hypothesize potential causation by associating online radicalization with external factors such as: search for identity and meaning, the growing inequalities in European and other societies, unemployment and fewer opportunities for development especially for minority youth, exclusion, discrimination and inequality that are massively used in extremist discourses. Studies of adolescents in Serbia and Sweden have linked such conditions to loneliness arising from family dysfunction and a harsh school environment, and to political distrust, powerlessness and dissatisfaction; the associations were stronger among boys.

=== Misogyny ===
Youth can come into contact with online content and individuals who radicalize them to adopt extremist views regarding women, masculinity, and gender roles. Research shows that misogynistic content online targets mostly young men (ages 13-25) who report feelings of social isolation or rejection. This content is often appears as inspirational and aspirational self-improvement content containing both covert and overt misogynistic views. This content might promote harmful gender ideologies, including the stigmatization of female sexuality, commonly referred to as "slut shaming" and the unrealistic masculine body ideals, such as the “gym bro” aesthetic, and targets the vulnerability or social rejection that attract young men towards this content in the first place.

This content is partially pushed by algorithms used on social media platforms that present users with content depending on what content the user has interacted with previously. Research on algorithms and online misogynistic content has found that young users, regardless of whether or not they actively engage with such content, are often exposed to it after spending some time on the platform.

Research has investigated how younger users encounter and engage with misogynistic content promoted by influencers associated with the manosphere, such as Andrew Tate. Tate’s content has been criticised for portraying violence and dominance as essential elements of masculinity, and for suggesting that men who do not conform to this model are weak. In his commentary on women, Tate describes women as subordinate to men and has made comments that objectify women. Much of Tate's content is framed within the context of self-improvement or aspirational content, which critics argue serves to obscure the underlying misogynistic ideology.

== Social media and violent radicalization ==
=== In the Arab World ===
The analysis of the profiles of researchers and publications on violent radicalization from the Arab world reveals the prominence of specialists on Islamist movements. They are, most often, humanities and social science researchers and some are specialists in media and public opinion, international relations, or even security. Another specificity of research on violent radicalization in the Arabic-speaking region is the involvement of religious researchers in this field. The main objective of this contribution is part of a state strategy to counter faith advocated by violent radical groups. In this logic, radicalization or jihadism are replaced by the term terrorist in referral to these groups. In other regions, experts use terms such as jihadist Salafism or jihadism or violent radicalization. There is a clear tendency among most Arabic-speaking researchers to avoid the use of the word Islam and its semantic field to denote violent radical groups. This is also why researchers from the region prefer to use the Arabic acronym Daesh or the State Organization instead of the ‘Islamic State.’ Most research published from the Arab world does not focus on the relation between violent radicalization and Internet or social media, nor does it evaluate the effect of prevention or intervention cyberinitiatives.

Arab youth are major consumers of social media networks and especially Facebook, which is one of the top ten most used sites by Arab Internet users, a tendency that quickly found its translation into the Arab political realm. According to a study by Mohamed Ibn Rachid Faculty for governance in the United Arab Emirates, the number of Facebook users in 22 Arab countries increased from 54.5 million in 2013 to 81.3 million in 2014 with a majority being young people. The study of literature in the region reveals the role played by social networks, especially Facebook and Twitter, as platforms for collective expression for Arab youth on current issues, conflicts and wars (e.g., Gaza situation in particular). In Iraq, for example, young Internet users and bloggers launched several campaigns on Facebook and Twitter at the beginning of military operations to free the major cities occupied by ISIS (Fallujah and Mosul). In Morocco, other initiatives with the same objective were launched such as the one by Hamzah al-Zabadi on Facebook ( مغاربة_ضد_داعش#; Moroccans against Daesh), which consisted of sharing all kinds of content (images, texts, etc.) to contradict and challenge ISIS's narratives. The involvement of civil society actors on the web in the fight against terrorism and violent radicalization in the Arab region remains modest for many reasons including the lack of media policies dedicated to this struggle.

=== In Asia ===
Researchers in Asia have developed a complex understanding of radicalization as being deeply connected to psychosocial and economic grievances such as poverty and unemployment, marginalization through illiteracy and lack of education, admiration for charismatic leaders, pursuit of social acceptability, and psychological trauma. These factors are considered by authors to facilitate online radicalization-oriented recruitment, especially among young people, who are more vulnerable and spend more time online.

A 2016 report by "We Are Social" revealed that East Asia, Southeast Asia, and North America were the first, second, and third largest social media markets worldwide respectively. According to the same report, Facebook and Facebook Messenger are the predominant social and communications tools, followed by Twitter, Line and Skype. China is the notable exception as Facebook Messenger is outpaced by far by Chinese social media tools. China presents a very different profile from most countries in its mainstream social media and networks. American platforms such as Google, Yahoo!, Facebook, Twitter and YouTube have very little market penetration due to state restrictions and the strong monopoly of homegrown search engines and Internet platforms in Chinese language.

There is rising interest among Chinese researchers in examining the relationship between social media and violent radicalization.

Indonesia has an estimated 76 million Indonesians who connect regularly on Facebook, establishing the nation as the fourth largest user of the world, after India, the United States and Brazil. Indonesia is also the fifth largest user of Twitter, after the United States, Brazil, Japan and the United Kingdom. The Institute for Policy Analysis of Conflict (IPAC) examines how Indonesian extremists use Facebook, Twitter and various mobile phone applications such as WhatsApp and Telegram. Social media use by extremists in Indonesia is increasing. They use social media, such as Facebook and Twitter, to communicate with young people, to train and to fundraise online. Recruitment is done through online games, propaganda videos on YouTube and calls to purchase weapons. The proliferation of ISIS propaganda via individual Twitter accounts has raised concerns about the possibility of "lone actor" attacks. That being said, the report points out that such attacks are extremely rare in Indonesia.

=== In Africa ===
There is little contemporary research on online radicalization in Sub-Saharan Africa. However, at its heart, Africa carries a powerful extremist group: "Boko Haram", whose real name is Jama’atu Ahlu-Sunna wal Jihad Adda’wa Li («Group of the People of Sunnah for Preaching and Jihad») since 2002 and has pledged allegiance to the Daesh. The network is less resourceful and financed compared to Daesh, but it seems to have entered in a new era of communication by the use of social media networks, more so since its allegiance to Daesh. To spread their principles this terrorist group uses the Internet and adapts Daesh communication strategies to the sub-Saharan African context to spread its propaganda (also in French and English) with more sophisticated videos. By its presence on the most used digital networks (Twitter, Instagram), Boko Haram breaks with traditional forms of communication in the region such as propaganda videos sent to agencies on flash drives or CD-ROM. Video content analyses has also shown a major shift from long monologues from the leader Abubakar Shekau, that had poor editing and translation, to messages and videos that have increased its attractiveness among sub-Saharan youth. Today, Boko-Haram owns a real communications agency called «al-Urwa Wuqta» (literally «the most trustworthy», «the most reliable way»). Moreover, the group multiplies its activities on Twitter especially via their smartphones, as well as through YouTube news channels. Most tweets and comments of the group's supporters denounce the Nigerian government and call for support for Boko Haram movement. The tweets are written in Arabic at first and then translated and passed on into English and French, which reflect the group's desire to place itself in the context of what it sees as global jihad. In a recent study conducted in 2015, researchers have shown how Boko Haram-related tweets include rejection of the movement by non-members of the organisation.

In Kenya, and by extension the Horn of Africa, online radicalization and recruitment processes are dependent on narrative formations and dissemination. However, other than one documented case of purely online radicalization and recruitment, evidence shows that the process is cyclic involving both an online-offline-online, process that advances depending on the level of socialization and resonance factors shared with the vulnerable populations. A recent study from Scofield Associates shows that narrative formation depends on three major attributes; having a believable story, actionable plans for those who encounter it, and the need for a religious cover. The third characteristic provides support to the persuasion process and adds to the global whole. The persuasion process plays out very well with an Online platform or audience.

=== In the United States ===
The Pew Research Center reports that 96% of U.S. teenagers (ages 13-17) use the Internet daily, and 46% say that they are online almost constantly. This high level on online engagement increases the likelihood of exposure to a wide range of online content, including ideological or extremist material.

The U.S. Department of Homeland Security has noted that extremist groups are increasingly using social media and networking platforms to disseminate ideological content and to recruit new members. In the United States, far-right groups such as the Proud Boys have used mainstream platforms for both propaganda and recruitment purposes. These groups often evade content moderation policies by using encoded language, euphemisms and symbolism to obscure their messaging. In recent years, some of these communities have migrated to platforms with less stringent content moderation policies, such as X (formerly Twitter) and Gab.

Social media platforms act as a medium through which extremist groups may target and radicalize younger users, usually through the use of memes and short-form videos that are easily shareable and culturally relevant. Some researchers have noted that extremist content is often packaged in ironic and humorous ways to appeal to younger audiences. In several mass shootings, such as the ones in Poway, Christchurch, El Paso, and Buffalo, investigations revealed that the perpetrators had been exposed to or engaged with online extremist content prior to committing acts of violence.

The U.S. Department of Homeland Security's Center for Prevention Programs and Partnerships (CP3) works with local organizations and agencies to prevent radicalization before it escalates into real-world violence. CP3 facilitates the Targeted Violence and Terrorism Prevention (TVTP) Grant Program and provides funding to governments, nonprofit organizations, and educational institutions to establish or enhance initiatives to prevent targeted violence and terrorism. CP3 also works with faith-based organizations to improve the safety of their facilities. However, federal layoffs by the Trump administration and the Department of Government Efficiency (DOGE) in March 2025, has led to a 20% reduction in CP3 staff.

== Online prevention initiatives ==
=== Alternative narratives ===
Van Eerten, Doosje, Konijn, De Graaf, and De Goede suggest that counter or alternative narratives could be a promising prevention strategy. Some researchers argue that a strong alternative narrative to violent jihadist groups is to convey the message that they mostly harm Muslims. During the last decade, the United States government has set up two online programs against radicalization designed to counter anti-American propaganda and misinformation from al-Qaeda or the Islamic state. These programs seek to win the "war of ideas" by countering self-styled jihadist rhetoric.

Private sector counter-initiatives involve the YouTube Creators for Change with young "ambassadors" mandated to "drive greater awareness and foster productive dialogue around social issues through content creation and speaking engagements"; the "redirectmethod.org" pilot initiative to use search queries in order to direct vulnerable young people to online videos of citizen testimonies, on-the-ground reports, and religious debates that debunk narratives used for violent recruitment. The initiative avoids "government-produced content and newly or custom created material, using only existing and compelling YouTube content".

Several governments are opting to invest in primary prevention through education of the public at large, and of young public in particular, via various "inoculatory" tactics that can be grouped under the broad label of Media and Information Literacy (MIL). Based on knowledge about the use of MIL in other domains, this initiative can be seen, interalia, as a long term comprehensive preventive strategy for reducing the appeal of violent radicalization.

=== Media and information literacy ===
MIL has a long tradition of dealing with harmful content and violent representations, including propaganda. In its early history, MIL was mostly put in place to fight misinformation (particularly in advertising) by developing critical skills about the media. By the 1980s, MIL also introduced cultural and creative skills to use the media in an empowering way, with active pedagogies. Since the year 2000, MIL has enlarged the media definition to incorporate the Internet and social media, adding issues related to ethical uses of online media to the traditional debates over harmful content and harmful behavior and aligning them more with the perspectives that consider issues of gratifications of media users.

Media and Social Media	Politics and Law	Academia and Think Tanks
News and entertainment media give disproportionate attention to social media as an explanation of violent radicalization, to the detriment of other explanations (religious strife, alienation, geopolitics of terror, racism and segregation, youth unemployment etc.).	States and social media platforms operate a series of counter-measures ranging from censorship to counter-narratives and education strategies.	Lack of capacity for researchers to engage with theory and empirical research
An alarmist representation of violent radicalization can lead to politics of fear and of fear-mongering by various interested parties, and create a chilling effect on dissent and critical expression.	There are questions about strategies like blocking of access and filtering content, because there is no clear evidence about the effectiveness of these steps. The impact of online surveillance on radicalization is complicated to research, and is barely covered in the literature.	Lack of interdisciplinary collaboration
The spread of stereotypes transforms the "other" into a potential enemy and can affect the way minorities are viewed and view themselves.	There seems to be a developing trend for online counter-speech that challenges extremist representations and hate speech. There is less evidence of alternative narratives that acknowledge feelings of powerlessness and alienation, and which propose non-violent ways to address perceived or real grievances. It is also rare to find references to the value of preserving the independence of civil society and media in regard to multi-stakeholder engagement in countering violent narratives.	Lack of research on the impact of censorship, surveillance, counter-speech and Media and Information Literacy
	Education-centered solutions show few initiatives that have been documented and assessed for their efficacy. Many Media and Information Literacy (MIL) resources designed to be used by teachers in a classroom setting are focused on critical thinking, on debunking plot theory, "fake news" and rumors, and on extolling fact-checking. Their impact in terms of reducing risks of online violent radicalization is still not clear.	

== International human rights standards ==
Key international human rights standards to serve as a benchmark for approaching violent extremism
The International Covenant of Civil and Political Rights (ICCPR)	Foregrounds the protection of freedom of expression in Article 19. The Covenant also recognizes that certain exceptional speech falls outside of free expression. Article 20 calls for prohibitions on "propaganda for war", and on "any advocacy of national, racial or religious hatred that constitutes incitement to discrimination, hostility or violence". In Article 19 of the ICCPR, certain expression may be limited by law—if necessary—for the purpose of protection of personal reputation, national security, public order, public health or public morals. All these provisions have a bearing on expression in relation to violent radicalization. General Comment No. 34 of the UN Human Rights Committee emphasizes that Article 20, on compulsory restrictions, has to be interpreted in the context of Article 19. Overall, it underlines that the norm is freedom, and that any restrictions should be exceptional and subject to necessity and proportionality.
The Rabat Plan of Action on the prohibition of advocacy of national, racial or religious hatred that constitutes incitement to discrimination, hostility or violence	The Rabat Plan was developed in 2012 by the UN's Office of the High Commissioner for Human Rights. It cautions us against illegitimate restrictions of speech based on purported implementation of ICCPR standards. The Rabat Plan proposes a nuanced approach to assessing expressions of hatred in terms of whether they really incite harm. This approach suggests that restriction should only be considered in terms of an assessment of (a) context of effect (the intent and likelihood), (b) the status of the speaker, (c) the specific content, (d) the reach of the expression, and (e) the actual imminent likelihood of resulting harm. This calls on us to use our heads, not our hearts, in reacting to the relationship of expression to the issue of violent radicalization.
The United Nations principles	There is recognition by regional and UN rapporteurs that speech can be "offensive, shocking and disturbing", without necessarily constituting a threat to national security, or hatred that incites harms, or propaganda for war. In October 2015, UNESCO's Executive Board adopted a decision on UNESCO's role in promoting education as a tool to prevent violent extremism.

== See also ==
- Deradicalization

== Sources ==
This article incorporates text from a free content work. Licensed under CC BY SA 3.0 IGO (license statement/permission). Text taken from Alava, Frau-Meigs & Hassan 2017

- Alava, Séraphin; Frau-Meigs, Divina; Hassan, Ghayda (2017). Youth and violent extremism on social media: mapping the research. UNESCO Publishing. ISBN 978-92-3-100245-8.
