= Empowering Local Partners to Prevent Violent Extremism in the United States =

The White House released the United States' first strategy to address "ideologically inspired" violence in August 2011. Entitled Empowering Local Partners to Prevent Violent Extremism in the United States (National Strategy for Empowering Local Partners), the eight-page document outlines "how the Federal Government will support and help empower American communities and their local partners in their grassroots efforts to prevent violent extremism." The strategy was followed in December 2011 by a more detailed Strategic Implementation Plan for Empowering Local Partners to Prevent Violent Extremism in the United States. The National Strategy for Empowering Local Partners and the strategic implementation plan (SIP) resulted from the identification of violent extremism and terrorism inspired by "al-Qaeda and its affiliates and adherents" as the "preeminent security threats" to the United States by the 2010 National Security Strategy and the 2011 National Strategy for Counterterrorism. Regardless of the priorization of the threat from al-Qaeda's ideology, both the strategy and SIP are geared towards all types of extremism without focus on a particular ideology.

== Development ==
The National Strategy for Empowering Local Partners, commonly referred to as the countering violent extremism (CVE) strategy, was over a year in the making and is the first such effort by the United States government. The National Security Staff (NSS) led the process of formulating the CVE strategy and implementation plan with an Interagency Policy Committee (IPC) on countering and preventing violent extremism in the U.S. established "to consider roles and responsibilities, potential activities, guiding principles, and how best to coordinate and synchronize [...] efforts". The IPC, along with sub-committees, drafted the CVE strategy which was approved by various government departments and agencies and signed by President Barack Obama. The development of the strategy involved multiple departments and agencies:

- Department of State
- Treasury Department
- Defense Department
- Justice Department
- Commerce Department
- Labor Department
- Health and Human Services Department
- Education Department
- Veterans Affairs
- Department of Homeland Security
- Federal Bureau of Investigation (FBI)
- National Counterterrorism Center (NCTC).

For the SIP, the NSS tasked NCTC "with coordinating the first comprehensive baseline of activities across the United States Government related to countering and preventing violent extremism in the United States". These activities are outlined in the SIP as "current activities and efforts" and were used to identify gaps and guide future efforts. Then Deputy National Security Council Advisor Denis McDonough, quoted in NPR, stated, "This strategy is not so much about how we're changing than having us lay down what we've been doing on a key issue.

== Countering violent extremism (CVE) strategy ==
The strategy defines violent extremists as "individuals who support or commit ideologically-motivated violence to further political goals". As the U.S. Constitution protects freedom of expression, the CVE plan is targeted towards people who take the step into violence or those who recruit or encourage others to violent action. By not focusing on a particular ideology, especially Islamic extremism, government officials hope "to skirt the problem of scapegoating or Islamophobia with what they call a 'more holistic approach.'" The stated goal of the CVE strategy "is to prevent violent extremists and their supporters from inspiring, radicalizing, financing, or recruiting individuals or groups in the United States to commit acts of violence."

As radicalization is an individual process occurring in local communities, the federal government wants to equip people, groups, and institutions at the state and city levels with the tools and resilience to counter violent extremism. Local partners "can more readily identify problems as they emerge and customize responses so that they are appropriate and effective".

The CVE strategy takes a "three-pronged approach that includes community engagement, better training, and counternarratives that make a case for why violent extremism is a dead end." The focus of the strategy is to build counter radicalization efforts into existing programs and structures, "while creating capacity to fill gaps" as needed. Towards this end, the strategy lists three models that might be leveraged for countering violent extremism: the Comprehensive Gang Model, Building Communities of Trust Initiative, and the Safe Schools/Healthy Students Initiative.

The United Kingdom has a longer history of addressing violent extremism than the U.S. and has an established strategy called PREVENT that served as an example for the United States. The PREVENT initiative is led by the law enforcement community and has been criticized for the possible conflict of interest of the same group being mandated to perform both community outreach and gather intelligence. The U.S. decided to place community leaders on the front line to avoid this pitfall. But a report by the Congressional Research Service questions if the U.S. government can avoid the conflict of officials mandated in various ways to prevent or prosecute crimes also being tasked with community outreach.

The strategy has drawn praise from American-Muslim organizations. The American-Arab Anti-Discrimination Committee approved the broad approach of the strategy, stating "extremism is not isolated to a single ideology or religion." On a similar note, the Council on American-Islamic Relations (CAIR) praised the CVE plan as "objective and holistic."

== Strategic implementation plan (SIP) ==
The Strategic Implementation Plan for Empowering Local Partners to Prevent Violent Extremism in the United States or SIP "provides a blueprint for how we [the U.S. government] will build community resilience against violent extremism." The plan "is not exhaustive, but it provides a better idea of what the [Obama] administration has in mind." A central concern of the implementation plan is to ensure compliance with the rule of law, particularly First Amendment rights.

The plan "envisions a fusion of local partners--school, community boards and leaders--with both local and federal law enforcement and other agencies" with some government partners involved that are new to national security, such as the Departments of Education and Health and Human Services. Quintan Wiktorowicz, a senior director of the National Security Council, observed the "challenge is going to be trying to put the violent extremism initiatives into existing programs."

The activities outlined in the plan "will be accomplished through existing funding and by prioritizing within the resources available to relevant departments and agencies." There are not specific metrics to gauge the success of the CVE strategy, "departments and agencies will be responsible for assessing their specific activities in pursuit of SIP objectives."

The SIP designates leaders and partners for specific objectives, but there is not one agency, department, or person leading the overall effort to counter violent extremism. A Congressional Research Service report suggests that Congress may want to consider legislation to designate a CVE lead.

=== Objectives ===
The SIP details three broad objectives and sub-objectives with the current activities and efforts that are occurring to meet these goals. To match the current activities, future efforts are listed to fill any gaps present in ongoing work.

The first objective of the SIP is "enhancing federal engagement with and support to local communities that may be targeted by violent extremists." With this broad goal are two sub-objectives:

- "Improve the depth, breadth, and frequency of federal government engagement with and among communities on the wide range of issues they care about".
- "Foster community-led partnerships and preventative programming to build resilience against violent extremist radicalization [...]"

The second objective is to build "government and law enforcement expertise for preventing violent extremism." The sub-objectives of the second aim:

- "Improve our understanding of violent extremism through increased research, analysis, and partnerships with foreign governments, academia, and nongovernmental organizations."
- "Increase federal government information sharing with state, local, and tribal governments and law enforcement on terrorist recruitment and radicalization."
- "Improve the development and use of standardized training with rigorous curricula [...] which conveys information about violent extremism; improves cultural competency; and imparts best practices and lessons for effective community engagement and partnerships."

Finally, the third objective is to counter "violent extremist propaganda while promoting our ideals" with the following sub-objectives:

- "Increase the capacity of communities to directly challenge violent extremist ideologies and narratives."
- "Improve and increase our communication to the American public about the threat posed by violent extremist groups, myths and misperceptions about violent extremist radicalization, and what we are doing to counter the threat."
- "Build a strategy to leverage new technologies and address online violent extremist radicalization."

== Criticism ==
As this is the first such strategy developed by the United States, there are questions and concerns from non-government organizations (NGOs), members of Congress, and the public.

The American-Arab Anti-Discrimination Committee opposes CVE, and raised concerns over targeting particular communities, how the guidelines will be implemented and what oversight will be used.

The American Civil Liberties Union (ACLU) worries about the potential for government censorship based on the CVE strategy's proposal for countering violent extremism propaganda.

Representative Peter T. King (R-NY) voiced concerns that the language of the CVE strategy "suggests some equivalency of threats between al-Qaeda and domestic extremists and also with the politically correct inference that legitimate criticism of certain radical organizations or elements of the Muslim-American community should be avoided."

Senators Joseph Lieberman (I-CT) and Susan Collins (R-ME) appreciate the CVE strategy and the SIP as an important aspect of homeland defense, but have many concerns. The senators are "disappointed by the Administration's refusal to identify violent Islamist extremism as our enemy", and further state "to understand this threat and counter it, we must not shy away from making a sharp distinction between the peaceful religion followed by millions of law-abiding Americans and a twisted corruption of that religion used to justify violence." Further, they question the oversight and leadership of the SIP, the timeframe for achieving the objectives, the resources necessary to meet the strategy's goals, and the measures of successes.

Frank Gaffney, Jr. from the Center for Security Policy views countering violent extremism as a "euphemism" that is used "in lieu of phrases that actually describe the nature of the principal enemy we face at the moment"--Islamic extremism. Using violent extremism creates a problem because it excludes non-violent ideological threats that are a threat to the American system. Also, by not focusing on a particular ideology, the implementation of the CVE strategy cannot concentrate on the current threat to U.S. national security and divides scarce resources.

== See also ==
- Islamic Extremism in the United States
- Homegrown terrorism
- Radicalization
