= Nonviolent extremism =

Nonviolent extremism is the expression of extremist ideas through nonviolent means, without the use of terrorism or political violence. It can be contrasted with violent extremism. Nonviolent extremism manifests from the same ideologies as violent extremism, including right wing extremism, left wing extremism, and religious extremism. Much of the study of nonviolent extremism focuses on its potential to produce or incite violent extremism.

== Definition ==
The primary distinction between violent and nonviolent extremism is the act of causing physical harm in the name of extremist beliefs. However, the line between violent and nonviolent extremism is not always clear. The spread of extremist ideas may be seen as contributing to and participating in violent extremism as an act of incitement, even if the speaker is not the one directly carrying out violent acts. Some scholars maintain that incitement to violence is an act of violent extremism, while others insist that a clear line should be drawn between discussion of violent acts and active participation in violent acts.

Violent extremists typically arise from nonviolent extremist groups, with the main disagreement being one of methodology rather than ideology. Nonviolent extremists may still engage in extremist activity, including sharing violent literature, sending hate mail, or providing financial support to violent extremists. Some extremist groups, such as Hizb ut-Tahrir, claim to be nonviolent while also justifying or endorsing acts of violence. Other groups, such as the Salafist Group for Preaching and Combat and the Moroccan Islamic Combatant Group, engage in acts of terrorism despite being nominally nonviolent.

Whether something constitutes nonviolent extremism may be contested. Some nonviolent groups, such as the Amish, meet many of the criteria associated with extremism, including a religiously motivated rejection of society, but are not typically referred to as extremist. The act of self-immolation is considered extreme, but it is an act of violence that does not target the innocent as violent extremism does.

== Concerns ==
While nonviolent extremism does not directly cause violence, there are concerns that it can inflict harm indirectly. The primary concern regarding nonviolent extremism is that it will foster violent extremism. Some nonviolent extremists may also offer some level of support to violent extremists, even if they do not themselves engage in violence. Daniel Chirot and Clark McCauley argue that the disgust response perpetuates extremism due to the mind's interpretation of contamination, establishing the foundation for both violent and nonviolent extremism from the same source.

Nonviolent right wing extremism has been found to "contribute to a climate of fear of and animosity towards minority groups". Left wing extremism is typically nonviolent, but the use of violent rhetoric by nonviolent left wing extremists has been linked to acts of physical violence and evasion of law enforcement. Due to the existence of violent extremism, nonviolent extremism can sometimes seem moderate in comparison due to the "positive radical flank effect", where the violent nature of some extremists groups lowers the bar of what behavior is tolerated from extremists.

== Prevention ==
Due to its negative implications, the countering of nonviolent extremism is seen as a major priority. However, the prevention of nonviolent extremism presents additional legal challenges for authorities that are not present in the prevention of violent extremism. While violent extremism involves illegal acts of violence, expression of nonviolent extremism is oftentimes protected by the right to freedom of speech in democratic countries, and the countering of nonviolent extremism has to be balanced with civil rights concerns.

In the United Kingdom, counterterrorism measures have controversially emphasized catching and preventing nonviolent extremism as part of the CONTEST program.

== See also ==
- Nonviolent resistance
- Radicalization
- Fundamentalism
- Religious fanaticism
- Online youth radicalization
- Nonviolent revolution
