= Post-fascism =

Ideological shift from fascism to more mainstream conservatism

Post-fascism is a label describing political parties and movements which have transitioned from a fascist political ideology toward a more moderate, mainstream form of conservatism. While they have largely abandoned totalitarian methods to participate fully in a liberal democratic system, they still retain several core, non-totalitarian characteristics of fascism. These typically include neo-nationalism, anti-communism, anti-liberalism, and an ongoing skepticism toward liberal democracy.

The term democratic fascism has also been used. Since the 21st century, several overtly fascist parties in Europe have pivoted toward this ideology to achieve electoral dominance. This strategic shift has allowed them to enter or lead coalition governments in multiple nations, most notably exemplified by Brothers of Italy following their victory in the 2022 Italian general election.

== Definition ==
Political philosopher Gáspár Miklós Tamás, who first defined post-fascism, stated in 2018:

"I have coined the term post-fascism to describe a cluster of policies, practices, routines and ideologies which can be observed everywhere in the contemporary world. Without ever resorting to a coup d'etat, these practices are threatening our communities. They find their niche easily in the new global capitalism, without upsetting the dominant political forms of electoral democracy and representative government. Except in Central Europe, they have little or nothing to do with the legacy of Nazism. They are not totalitarian; not at all revolutionary; not based on violent mass movements or irrationalist, voluntarist philosophies. Nor are they toying, even in jest, with anti-capitalism. I should define what I mean by the term "post-fascist". I take the term "fascism" to refer to a break with the enlightenment tradition of citizenship as a universal entitlement; that is to say, with its assimilation of the civic condition to the human condition. It is this concept of universal citizenship that underpinned the notion of progress shared by liberal, social democrat and all the other assorted progressive heirs of the Enlightenment. Once the Enlightenment equated citizenship with human dignity in this way, its extension to all classes, professions, both sexes, all races, creeds, and locations was only a matter of time. Universal franchise, the national service, and state education for all had to follow. National solidarity demanded, moreover, the relief of the estate of Man, a dignified material existence for all, and the eradication of the remnants of personal servitude."

Historian and journalist Isaac Stanley-Becker describes the differences between traditional fascism and Tamas' concept, particularly as in regards to Hungary and Victor Orban:

Post-fascism doesn't involve paramilitaries or do away with elections outright. It operates by stripping certain groups, such as immigrants and sexual minorities, of full citizenship. In place of theories of a master race, its rationale is based on perceived cultural incompatibility or civilizational defense. It is not utopian but cynical and bureaucratic.

Journalist Claudio Tito, taking the case of parties in Italy, also highlights that post-fascism seeks to establish a fascist state through democratic processes and institutions.

== Locations ==
Tamás writes that "post-fascism is not unique to Central Europe. Far from it", although its appearance in Germany, Austria, and Hungary "are important, for historical reasons."

=== Italy ===
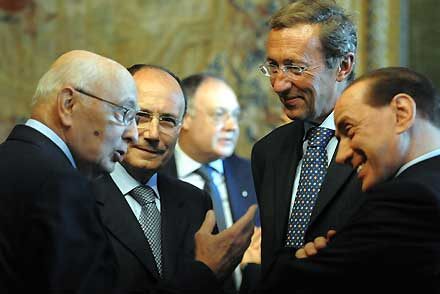
President of the Chamber of Deputies Gianfranco Fini of the Alleanza Nazionale, with president Giorgio Napolitano and prime minister Silvio Berlusconi, 2001.

The Italian Social Movement (Movimento Sociale Italiano, MSI) was a neo-fascist political party established in Italy in 1946 by former members of the National Fascist Party and the Republican Fascist Party. Despite being an explicitly fascist party, the MSI included a post-fascist faction headed by Arturo Michelini and Alfredo Covelli, who favoured political cooperation with moderate conservative parties, such as the Christian Democracy, the Monarchist National Party and the Italian Liberal Party.

In 1977, a moderate faction of the MSI led by Covelli split away and established National Democracy (Democrazia Nazionale, DN), the first real post-fascist party in Italy. Covelli attempted to create an alliance between DN and the Christian Democracy, but electoral results were very poor and DN was eventually disbanded in 1979.

The MSI eventually repudiated fascism in a party congress held in Fiuggi in 1995, where the party voted to disband itself and transform into National Alliance (Alleanza Nazionale, AN), a party which has been labeled by several scholars and journalists, including academic Roger Griffin, as a "post-fascist" party. A minority faction in the MSI, led by Pino Rauti, refused to abandon fascism and created a new party called Social Movement Tricolour Flame.

The right-wing party Brothers of Italy (Fratelli d'Italia, FdI), which was established in 2012 by several former members of AN and currently leads the government of Italy, has also been described as a post-fascist party by several media reports, and academics.

=== France ===
==== Marine Le Pen, National Rally ====
The National Rally (French: Rassemblement National, RN), political party of France was founded in 1972 by right-wing activist Jean-Marie Le Pen; former Nazi (Waffen-SS) members Pierre Bousquet and Léon Gaultier; neo-Nazi sympathizers such as François Duprat; among others. The original National Rally leader, Jean-Marie Le Pen, was known for Holocaust denial, street brawling, and disapproval ratings among the French public that ranged between 70 to 87% over the last 30 years of his life. The French political establishment reacted, starting in the early 2000s, by maintained an informal cordon sanitaire of tactical voting and cross-party alliances, known as the 'republican front', to prevent him and the National Front in general from taking power. When his daughter, Marine Le Pen, succeeded him as party leader in 2011, she sought to get around the political boycott by pursued a policy of "Dédiabolisation" (de-demonisation), changing the name from National Front to National Rally and maintaining the "new" party was neither on the right nor left. She went so far as to censure her father, who was suspended and then expelled from the party in 2015.

The RN opposes immigration, specifically calling for stricter control of illegal immigration, significant cuts to legal immigration, and protection of "French identity". Despite decades of French political parties from left to center-right refusing it any measure of electoral cooperation, the RN has been the single largest parliamentary opposition party in France's National Assembly since 2022. In the 2022 French presidential election, Marine Le Pen reached the 2nd round with 23.15% of the votes, though she was defeated by incumbent Emmanuel Macron, after receiving 41.45% of the votes in the run-off. Marine Le Pen received 13 million votes in the second round. The RN appears to have evolved into "a permanent force rather than a protest movement", and as of Spring 2026 to be in a strong position to defeat France's ruling centrists in the next election.

=== Hungary ===
==== Victor Orban, Fidesz ====
While Viktor Orbán, Hungary's longest-serving prime minister, describes his ideology as "illiberalism", at least two observers (Isaac Stanley-Becker and Hungarian poet Renátó Fehér) prefer the term post fascism. In 2014, after Orban announced his plans for what he called an "illiberal state," Tamás himself warned of Orban's danger, in an interview in which Tamás urged the public to read between the lines. Orban "told us that he will not be removed by elections," Tamás declared, and predicted that "those who are against him must be prepared for the grimmest struggle."

==== Jobbik ====
Founded in 2002 as a radical and nationalist, self-described "radically patriotic Christian party", devoted to and irredentism and the protection of "Hungarian values and interests", Jobbik was described by others as an "anti-Semitic organization" (The Independent), and as a "neo-Nazi party" (the president of the European Jewish Congress). In 2016, Jobbik's leadership pivoted to a strategy of dédiabolisation (de-demonization), aiming to transform its image into a more respectable voter-friendly moderate conservative people's party by abandoning parts of its original ideology and excluding certain extremist elements, hoping to present a credible opposition to the rightwing authoritarian government of Viktor Orbán. In the 2018 Hungarian parliamentary election, Jobbik polled 1,092,806 votes making it the second-largest party in Hungary's National Assembly, but by 2026 it had suffered a major loss of support.

=== Russia ===
==== Vladimir Putin ====
In a 2016 interview, Tamás compared Orbán and Vladimir Putin, stating that like Putin in Russia and Recep Tayyip Erdoğan in Turkey, Orbán had used financial carrots and sticks against opposition media, politicians, and their supporters, human rights groups, 'Soros-financed NGOs', etc. but had not arrested and assassinated his enemies.

=== Spain ===
==== People's Party ====
The People's Alliance, later People's Party, was founded in Spain in 1976 by seven former high level officials in the dictatorship of Francisco Franco — Manuel Fraga, Laureano López Rodó, Cruz Martínez Esteruelas, Federico Silva Muñoz, Gonzalo Fernández de la Mora, Licinio de la Fuente and Enrique Thomas de Carranza. In the ensuing decades the group became a mainstream conservative party, holding power nationally from 1996 through 2004 under José María Aznar and from 2011 to 2018 under Mariano Rajoy.

By 2020s the party or elements of its leadership, were described as "traditionally" close to the Roman Catholic Church, opposed to "woke and lefty culture,” to separatism, and in favor of cuts in spending, taxation and government debt.

=== Sweden ===
==== Jimmie Åkesson, Sweden Democrats ====
According to a white paper written on the history of the Sweden Democrats party (SD), the group began as a reorganization of Bevara Sverige Svenskt (BSS, "Keep Sweden Swedish"), a right-wing racist and extremist, "national revolutionary campaign organization". The paper, written by Tony Gustafsson, who had access to the party's archives, relates that members of the youth association, formed in 1992, greeted each other with "hell", a euphemism for the Nazis' "heil". In the early 1990s, the party sponsored music shows featuring white power music with songs about "dreams of racial war, hatred of homosexuality, and tributes to the Ku Klux Klan".

In 1995, the current party head, Jimmie Åkesson, joined the SD. At that time, Gustafsson states, SD

was a party with dual heads. On the one hand, it was "we are only critical of the immigration policy that has been pursued". But in reality, it is a party that is characterized by a heavy ideological heritage. A mixture of racial ideas, National Socialist ideas, anti-Semitism, and xenophobia, so to speak ....

Sweden Democrats were ostracised by Sweden's mainstream parties for many years. This included not only left and center, but right of centre parties such as the ruling Moderates who excluded the SD from their government despite depending on the SD votes in parliamentary to stay in power.

Åkesson took over SD in 2005 and around 2012 instituted a "zero-tolerance" policy against racism and extremism. As of 2026, the Moderate party has abandoned its boycott of SD, and agreed to allow SD in the government if the right parties win the election, (though at least one poll shows a lack of majority support among the Swedish public for such a government). As of 2026 the party's primary (public) issue continues to be immigration. Its chief ideologist, Mattias Karlsson, calls for a "complete abolition of multiculturalism," and the party calls for ban on traditional Islamic dress for women, the destruction of mosques that preach Islamic radicalism, an increase in the number of immigrants expelled from Sweden and larger financial incentives to encourage immigrants to leave voluntarily.

== See also ==
- Anocracy
- Crypto-fascism
- Hybrid regime
- Illiberal democracy
- Jobbik
- Moderation theory
- Dédiabolisation
- Para-fascism
- Post-communism
- People's Alliance
- Deradicalization
