= Dédiabolisation =

Term in French politics

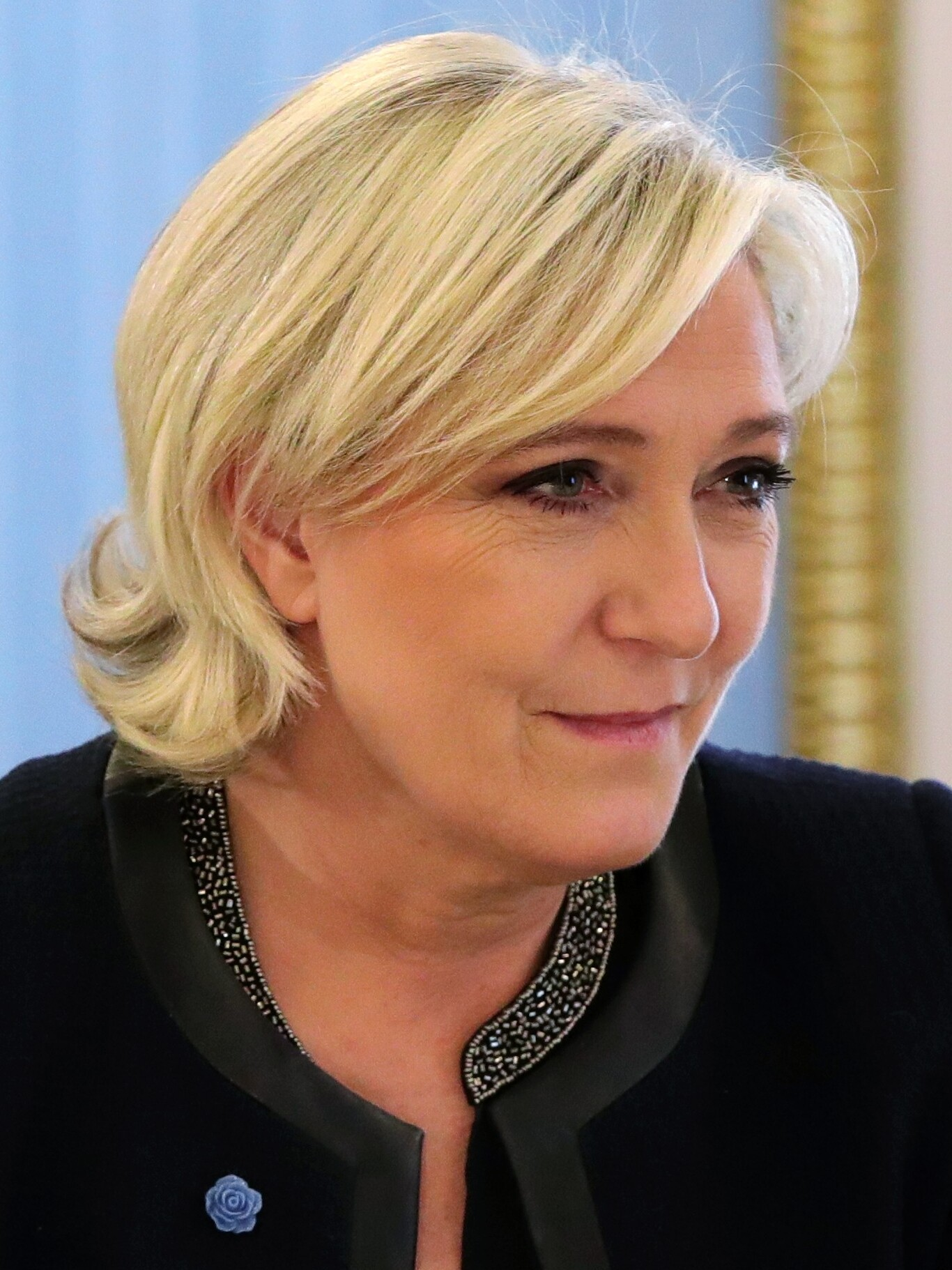
Marine Le Pen, the former National Rally leader, in 2017

Dédiabolisation (lit. 'de-demonisation') is a term used in French politics to describe the normalisation of the National Rally (RN), a far-right party formerly known as the National Front (FN), since the late 1980s.

== History ==
The term was coined by journalist Olivier Biffaud in a 1989 article in Le Monde, where he wrote that "the National Front has been 'demonised' [diabolisé] for several years. It is now undertaking its dédiabolisation. This, in essence, is the message that the leaders of the far-right movement have been trying to get across to their cadres since the start of the summer university they are holding in La Baule."

Upon assuming the FN leadership in 2011, Marine Le Pen made dédiabolisation a key plank of her leadership, particularly by expelling openly pro-Vichy France members from the party (including her father, Jean-Marie Le Pen) and by changing the party's name in 2018. The term was first entered into the Larousse Dictionary in 2015. Dédiabolisation has continued into the 2020s, as the RN began to compete for the largest party in French politics. This latest phase has included the election of 28-year-old Jordan Bardella as party president in 2022 and with Le Pen distancing herself from Éric Zemmour in the 2022 French presidential election.

== Reception ==
Historian Andrew Hussey said that dédiabolisation has "largely been a success" for the RN, adding that "a new generation has emerged... which doesn't care about the RN’s murky past – which is well beyond their lifetime anyway – and who will be very soon be shaping the future of France."

Robert Zaretsky of the University of Houston called the term "misleading", saying that it was "a public relations effort to change the public's view of the party" instead of a change in the party's values. Itay Lotem of the University of Westminster described the strategy as keeping the traditional FN "strategy of channelling nationalistic, anti-Muslim sentiment" but with a "polished, media savvy focus on eradicating any overt racism."

Safia Dahani of the Université Paris 1 Panthéon-Sorbonne stated that established political institutions and media have played key roles in dédiabolisation, pointing towards centre-right politicians who have defected to the RN, the election of RN MPs as vice-presidents of the National Assembly, and the frequency with which RN figures have been invited to participate in media programmes, while the media has at the same time softened its descriptions of the RN as far-right.

== See also ==
- Deradicalization
- Far-right politics in France
- Moderation theory
- Post-fascism
- Radical right (Europe)
