= Moderation theory =

Theory of group political de-radicalization

Moderation theory is a set of interrelated hypotheses that explain the process through which political groups eschew radical platforms in favour of more moderate policies and prefer electoral, compromising and non-confrontational strategies over non-electoral, exclusive, and confrontational strategies. Moderation can take place at both ideological and behavioural levels that mutually reinforce each other.

Moderation theory offers insights into the transformation of party politics in a great range of cultural and historical cases including socialist, Christian democratic, and far-right parties in Western Europe and more recently Islamic political groups. In particular, the evolution of Islamic political parties in Turkey since the early 1970s that culminated in the rise of the Justice and Development Party in the 2002 parliamentary elections exemplifies the dynamics highlighted by moderation theory.

The theory is composed of three causal mechanisms. First, once radical political groups are organized as vote-seeking parties, electoral considerations prevail and these groups abandon revolutionary agendas in favour of vote-maximizing strategies. This expectation is based on the median voter theorem. A second mechanism concerns the vulnerability of radical political groups participating in electoral contest to state repression. The logic of political survival necessitates that these groups avoid openly confronting state elites. The final mechanism involves the effects of organizational resources on group behaviour and suggests that the maintenance of electoral organization is prioritized over original political goals. Once radicals are organized as electoral parties, their original projects of revolutionizing the political system becomes unachievable simply because of the lack of organizational resources. While moderation of radicals is generally thought to be conducive to democratization, it can also hamper and even hinder democratic progress as radicals are co-opted into the ruling political system and lose their reformist characteristics.

In contemporary times, moderation theory is further developed and critically refined to understand the evolution of Islamic political parties in Muslim-majority countries as diverse as Egypt, Jordan, Indonesia, Iran, and Turkey. Egypt's Center Party (Hizb al-Wasat) is an example of a moderate Islamic organization that was not given license by the ruling regime. Moreover, Egypt's Muslim Brotherhood has transformed into an organization that is responsive to the logic of political competition and survival in an authoritarian regime at the cost of its original ideological commitments. Similarly, Jordan's Islamic Action Front shows that Islamists can be moderate as a result of participation in pluralistic political process as long as this participation can be justified in Islamic terms.

== See also ==
- Dédiabolisation
- Democratic socialism
- Deradicalization
- Iranian reformists
- Jobbik
- Overton window
- Post-fascism
- Radicalization
