= Religious fanaticism =

Fanaticism towards a religion

Religious fanaticism or religious extremism is a designation used to indicate uncritical zeal or obsessive enthusiasm that is related to one's own, or one's group's, devotion to a religion – a form of human fanaticism that could otherwise be expressed in one's other involvements and participation, including employment, role, and partisan affinities. In psychiatry, the term hyperreligiosity is used. Historically, the term was applied in Christian antiquity to denigrate non-Christian religions, and subsequently acquired its current usage with the Age of Enlightenment.

== Features ==
Lloyd Steffen cites several features associated with religious fanaticism or extremism:

- Spiritual needs: Human beings have a spiritual longing for understanding and meaning, and given the mystery of existence, that spiritual quest can only be fulfilled through some kind of relationship with ultimacy, whether or not that takes the form as a "transcendent other". Religion has power to meet this need for meaning and transcendent relationship.
- Attractiveness: It presents itself in such a way that those who find their way into it come to express themselves in ways consistent with the particular vision of ultimacy at the heart of this religious form.
- A 'live' option: It is present to the moral consciousness as a live option that addresses spiritual need and satisfies human longing for meaning, power, and belonging.

== Examples of religious fanaticism ==
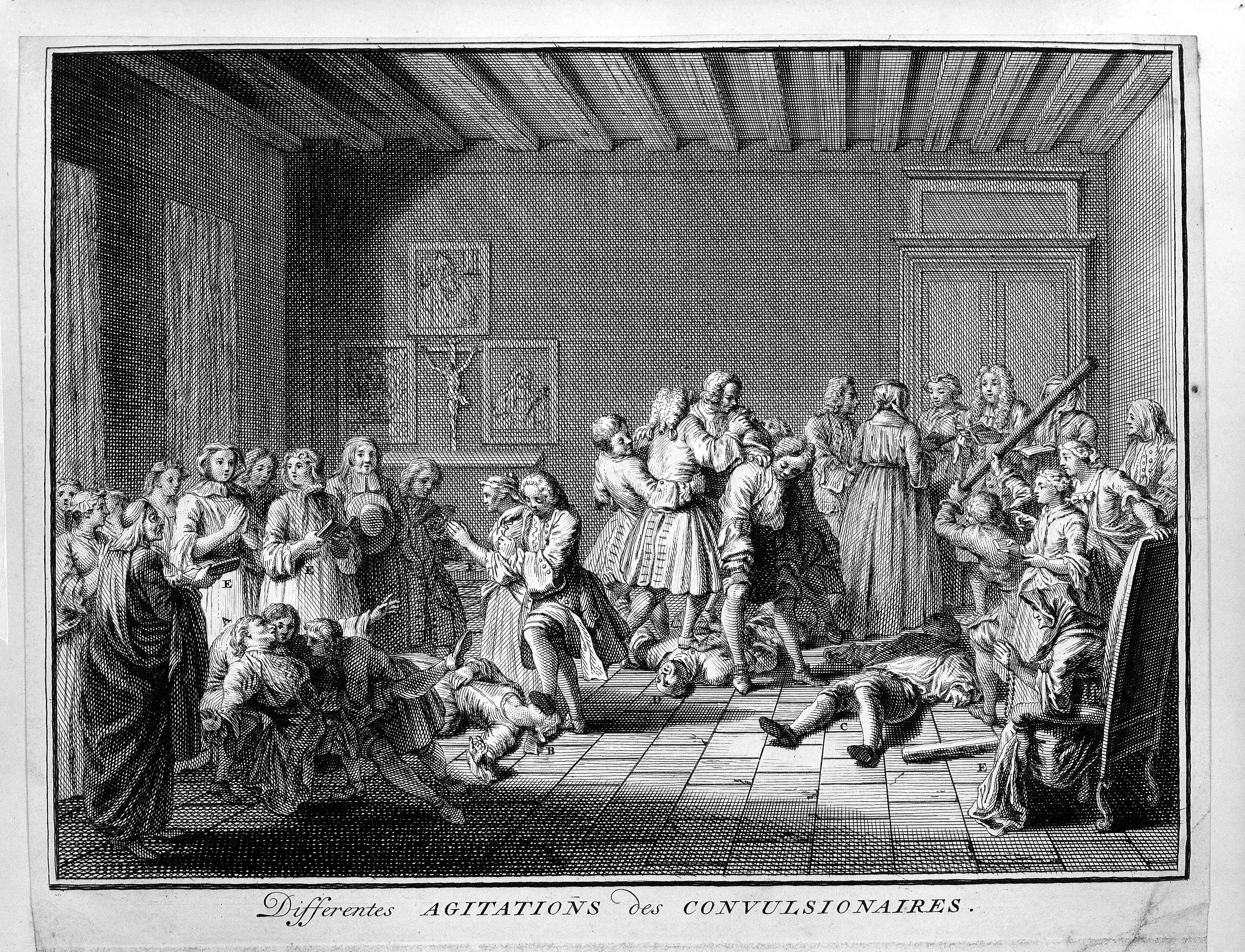
Members of the Jansenist sect having convulsions and spasms as a result of religious fanaticism. Engraving by Bernard Picart.

=== Christianity ===
Ever since Christianity was established, some of those in authority have sought to expand and control the church, often through the fanatical use of force. Grant Shafer says, "Jesus of Nazareth is best known as a preacher of nonviolence".

J. Harold Ellens states that the start of Christian fanatic rule came with the Roman Emperor Constantine I, saying,

"When Christianity came to power in the empire of Constantine, it proceeded to almost viciously repress all non-Christians and all Christians who did not line up with official Orthodox ideology, policy, and practice".

An example of Christians who didn't line up with Orthodox ideology is the Donatists, who "refused to accept repentant clergy who had formerly given way to apostasy when persecuted".

Fanatical Christian activity continued into the Middle Ages with the Crusades. These religious wars were attempts by the Catholics, sanctioned by the Pope, to conquer the Holy Land from the Muslims. However many Catholics see the crusades as a just war. Charles Selengut, in his book Sacred Fury: Understanding Religious Violence, said:

The Crusades were very much holy wars waged to maintain Christianity's theological and social control. On their way to conquering the Holy Land from the Muslims by force of arms, the crusaders destroyed dozens of Jewish communities and killed thousands because the Jews would not accept the Christian faith. Jews had to be killed in the religious campaign because their very existence challenged the sole truth espoused by the Christian Church.

Shafer adds that, "When the crusaders captured Jerusalem in 1099, they killed Muslims, Jews, and native Christians indiscriminately". Contrary to what Shafer alleges, however, no eyewitness source refers to Crusaders killing native Christians in Jerusalem, and early Eastern Christian sources (Matthew of Edessa, Anna Comnena, Michael the Syrian, etc.) make no such allegation about the Crusaders in Jerusalem. According to the Syriac Chronicle, all the Christians had already been expelled from Jerusalem before the Crusaders arrived. Presumably this would have been done by the Fatimid governor to prevent their possible collusion with the Crusaders.

Another prominent form of fanaticism according to some came a few centuries later with the Spanish Inquisition. The Inquisition was the monarchy's way of making sure their people stayed within Catholic Christianity. Selengut said, "The inquisitions were attempts at self-protection and targeted primarily "internal enemies" of the church". The driving force of the Inquisition was the Inquisitors, who were responsible for spreading the truth of Christianity. Selengut continues, saying:

The inquisitors generally saw themselves as educators helping people maintain correct beliefs by pointing out errors in knowledge and judgment... Punishment and death came only to those who refused to admit their errors ... during the Spanish Inquisitions of the fifteenth century, the clear distinction between confession and innocence and remaining in error became muddled.... The investigators had to invent all sorts of techniques, including torture, to ascertain whether ... new converts' beliefs were genuine.

During the Reformation Christian fanaticism increased between Catholics and the recently formed Protestants. Many Christians were killed for having rival viewpoints. The Reformation set off a chain of sectarian wars between the Catholics and the sectarian Protestants, culminating in the wars of religion.

=== Islam ===
Islamic extremism dates back to the early history of Islam with the emergence of the Kharijites in the 7th century CE. The original schism between Kharijites, Sunnīs, and Shīʿas among Muslims was disputed over the political and religious succession to the guidance of the Muslim community (Ummah) after the death of the Islamic prophet Muhammad. From their essentially political position, the Kharijites developed extreme doctrines that set them apart from both mainstream Sunnī and Shīʿa Muslims. Shīʿas believe ʿAlī ibn Abī Ṭālib is the true successor to Muhammad, while Sunnīs consider Abu Bakr to hold that position. The Kharijites broke away from both the Shīʿas and the Sunnīs during the First Fitna (the first Islamic Civil War); they were particularly noted for adopting a radical approach to takfīr (excommunication), whereby they declared both Sunnī and Shīʿa Muslims to be either infidels (kuffār) or false Muslims (munāfiḳūn), and therefore deemed them worthy of death for their perceived apostasy (ridda).

Sayyid Qutb, an Egyptian Islamist ideologue and prominent figurehead of the Muslim Brotherhood in Egypt, was influential in promoting the Pan-Islamist ideology in the 1960s. When he was executed by the Egyptian government under the regime of Gamal Abdel Nasser, Ayman al-Zawahiri formed the organization Egyptian Islamic Jihad to replace the government with an Islamic state that would reflect Qutb's ideas for the Islamic revival that he yearned for. The Qutbist ideology has been influential on jihadist movements and Islamic terrorists that seek to overthrow secular governments, most notably Osama bin Laden and Ayman al-Zawahiri of al-Qaeda, as well as the Salafi-jihadi terrorist group ISIL/ISIS/IS/Daesh. Moreover, Qutb's books have been frequently been cited by Osama bin Laden and Anwar al-Awlaki.

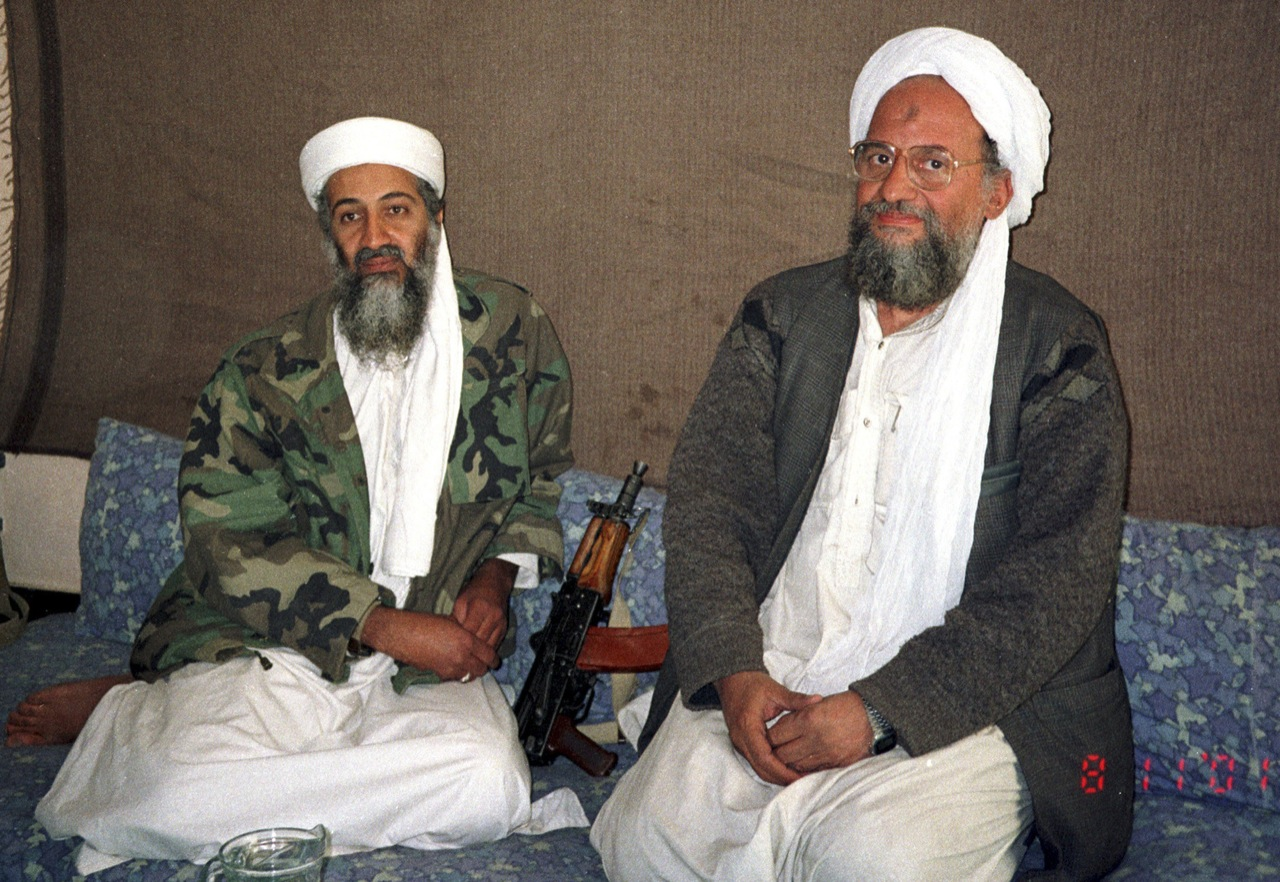
Religious extremists Osama bin Laden and Ayman al-Zawahiri of al-Qaeda promoted the overthrow of secular governments.

Since Osama bin Laden's fatwa in 1998, jihad has increasingly become an internationally recognized term. Bin Laden's concept, though, is very different from the actual meaning of the term. In the religious context, jihad most nearly means "working urgently for a certain godly objective, generally an imperialist one". The word jihad in Arabic means 'struggle'. The struggle can be a struggle of implementing the Islamic values in daily activities, a struggle with others to counter arguments against Islam, or self-defense when physically attacked because of belief in Islam. According to Steffen, there are portions of the Quran where military jihad is used. As Steffen says, though, "Jihad in these uses is always defensive. Not only does 'jihad' not endorse acts of military aggression, but 'jihad' is invoked in Qur'anic passages to indicate how uses of force are always subject to restraint and qualification". This kind of jihad differs greatly from the kind most commonly discussed today.

Thomas Farr, in an essay titled Islam's Way to Freedom, states that "Even though most Muslims reject violence, the extremists' use of sacred texts lends their actions authenticity and recruiting power". (Freedom 24) He goes on to say, "The radicals insist that their central claim – God's desire for Islam's triumph – requires no interpretation. According to them, true Muslims will pursue it by any means necessary, including dissimulation, civil coercion, and the killing of innocents". (Freedom 24)

According to certain observers this disregard for others and rampant use of violence is markedly different from the peaceful message that jihad is meant to employ. Although fanatic jihadists have committed many terroristic acts throughout the world, perhaps the best known is the September 11 attacks. According to Ellens, the al-Qaeda members who took part in the terrorist attacks did so out of their belief that, by doing it, they would "enact a devastating blow against the evil of secularized and non-Muslim America. They were cleansing this world, God's temple".

=== Hinduism ===
Violence based on communalistic-ideologies are quite predominant in the Indian subcontinent, especially since the British Raj, even resulting in the partition of British India based on religious lines by demand of Muslims to burn the subcontinent if not given separate land.

== See also ==
- Antitheism
- Brainwashing
- Cult suicide
- Extremism
- Hyperreligiosity
- Just war theory
- Mass suicide
- Nonviolent extremism
- Religious ecstasy
- Religious fundamentalism
- Religious obsessive-compulsive disorder
- Religious order
- Religious intolerance
- Religious supremacism
- Religious terrorism
- Religious violence
- Religious war
- Sectarian violence
- Violent extremism
- Hindu terrorism
  - Hindutva
  - Hindu nationalism
  - Violence against Muslims in independent India
  - Violence against Christians in India

== Bibliography ==
- Teaching in a World of Violent Extremism. N.p., Wipf & Stock Publishers, 2021.
