= Violent extremism =

Extremism perpetrated through violent means

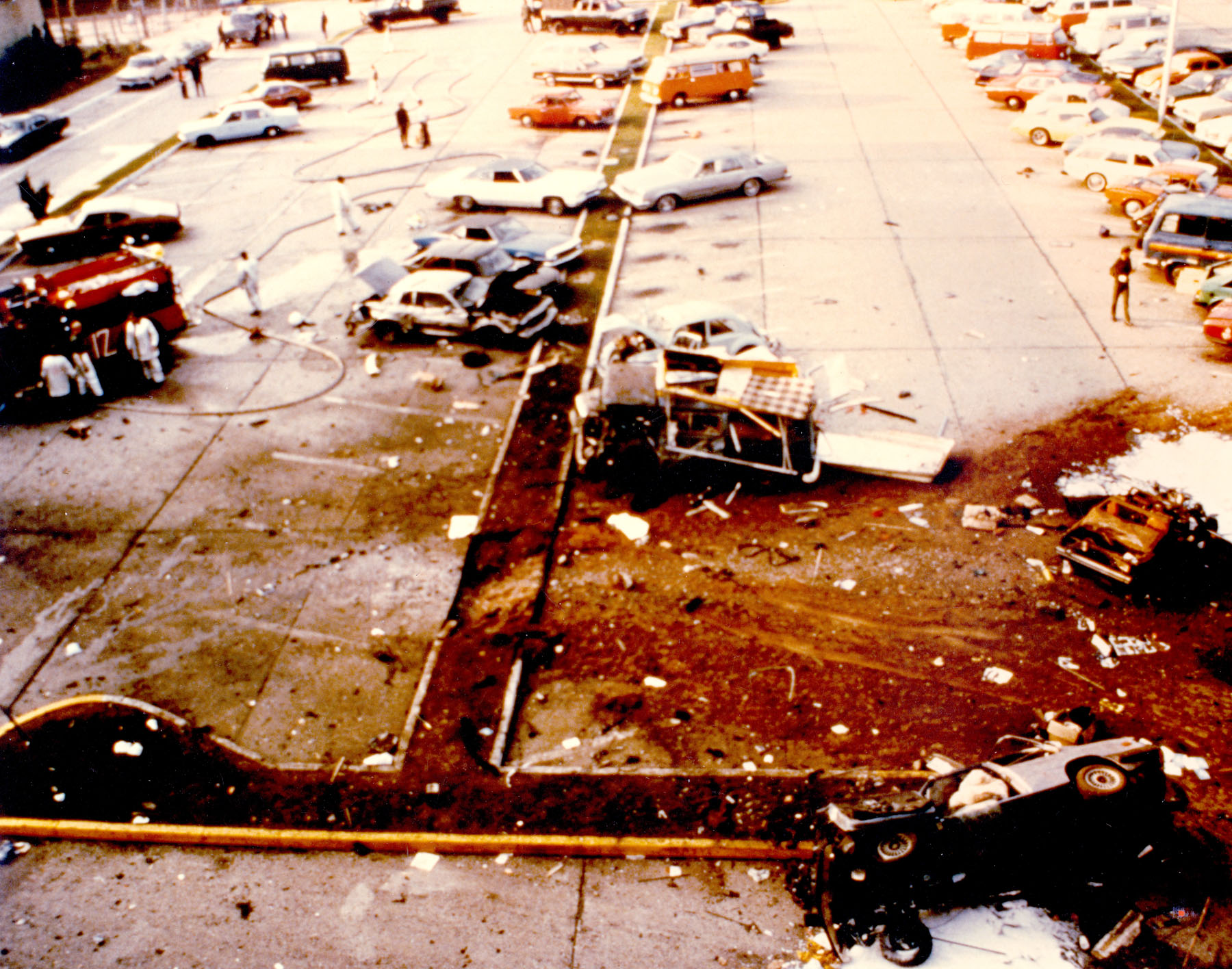
Aftermath of the Red Army Faction (RAF) bombing attack of the U.S. Air Forces Europe headquarters at Ramstein Air Base, West Germany (1981)

Violent extremism is a form of extremism that condones and enacts violence with ideological or deliberate intent, such as religious or political violence. Violent extremist views often conflate with religious and political violence, and can manifest in connection with a range of issues, including politics, religion, and gender relations.

Although "radicalization" is considered by some to be a contentious term, its general use has come to regard the process by which an individual or group adopts violence as a desirable and legitimate means of action. According to the RAND Corporation, extremism is a term used to characterize a variety of attitudes, beliefs, and behaviors that often are on the extreme end of the political, religious, or ideological spectrum within civil society.

In United States military jargon, the term violent extremist organizations (VEO) is defined as groups of "individuals who support or commit ideologically motivated violence to further political goals". This may include both international terrorist organizations (ITO) and homegrown violent extremists (HVE).

== Causes ==
There is no single profile or pathway for radicalization, or even speed at which it happens. Nor does the level of education seem to be a reliable predictor of vulnerability to radicalization. It is however established that there are socio-economic, psychological, and institutional factors that lead to violent extremism. Specialists group these factors into three main categories: push factors, pull factors, and contextual factors.

=== Push factors ===
"Push factors" are factors which drive individuals to violent extremism, such as: marginalization, social inequality, discrimination, persecution or the perception thereof; limited access to quality and relevant education; the denial of rights and civil liberties; and other environmental, historical, and socio-economic grievances.

=== Pull factors ===
"Pull factors" are factors which nurture the appeal of violent extremism; for example, the existence of well-organized violent extremist groups with compelling discourses and effective programs that are providing services, revenue and/or employment in exchange for membership. Groups can also lure new members by providing outlets for grievances and promise of adventure and freedom. Furthermore, these groups appear to offer spiritual comfort, "a place to belong" and a supportive social network.

==== Radicalization on the Internet ====
The Internet can be used as a "facilitator—even an accelerant—for terrorist and criminal activity." Radicalization of young people by foreign and homegrown terrorist groups frequently occurs on the Internet and social media platforms. According to a report on counter-terrorism from the Security, Conflict, and Cooperation in the Contemporary World (SCCCW) series published by Palgrave Macmillan (2022), "jihadist groups have exploited—and continue to exploit—the Internet to plan, recruit, train and execute terrorist attacks and spread their ideology online." The increase of online English-language extremist material in recent years is readily available with guidance to plan violent activity. "English-language web forums […] foster a sense of community and further indoctrinate new recruits". The Internet has "become a tool for spreading extremist propaganda, and for terrorist recruiting, training, and planning. It is a means of social networking for like-minded extremists... including those who are not yet radicalized, but who may become so through the anonymity of cyberspace."

Most studies fail to provide evidence on the drivers of interest in extremist sites, the engagement of social media in these issues, the reasons for the influence of its content, and the correlated external and internal factors, as well as the trajectories of youth who come to perpetuate violent acts. Some evidence suggests that the Internet and social media may play a role in the violent radicalization process, mainly through the dissemination of information and propaganda, as well as the reinforcement, identification and engagement of a (self)-selected audience that is interested in radical and violent messages. The synthesis of evidence shows, at its best, that social media is an environment that facilitates violent radicalization, rather than driving it.

=== Contextual factors ===
Contextual factors provide a favourable terrain to the emergence of violent extremist groups, such as: fragile states, the lack of rule of law, corruption, and criminality.

The following behaviors in combination have been identified as signs of potential radicalization:

- Sudden break with the family and long-standing friendships.
- Sudden drop-out of school and conflicts with the educational system.
- Change in behaviour relating to food, clothing, language, and/or finances.
- Changes in attitudes and behavior towards others: anti-social behaviour, rejection of authority, refusal to interact socially, signs of withdrawal and social isolation.
- Regular viewing of internet sites and participation in social media networks that condone radical or extremist views.
- Reference to apocalyptic beliefs and/or conspiracy theories.

== Prevention of radicalization and deradicalization ==
=== Education ===
Key dimensions of preventing violent extremism

The role of education in preventing violent extremism and deradicalizing young people has only recently gained global acceptance. An important step in this direction was the launch, in December 2015, of the UN Secretary-General’s Plan of Action to Prevent Violent Extremism which recognizes the importance of quality education to address the drivers of this phenomenon.

The United Nations Security Council also emphasized this point in its Resolutions 2178 and 2250, which notably highlights the need for “quality education for peace that equips youth with the ability to engage constructively in civic structures and inclusive political processes” and called on “all relevant actors to consider instituting mechanisms to promote a culture of peace, tolerance, intercultural and interreligious dialogue that involve youth and discourage their participation in acts of violence, terrorism, xenophobia, and all forms of discrimination.”

Education has been identified as preventing radicalization through:

- Developing the communication and interpersonal skills they need to dialogue, face disagreement and learn peaceful approaches to change.
- Developing critical thinking to investigate claims, verify rumors and question the legitimacy and appeal of extremist beliefs.
- Developing resilience to resist extremist narratives and acquire the social-emotional skills they need to overcome their doubts and engage constructively in society without having to resort to violence.
- Fostering critically informed citizens able to constructively engage in peaceful collective action.

UNESCO has emphasized Global Citizenship Education (GCED) as an emerging approach to education that focuses on developing learners’ knowledge, skills, values and attitudes in view of their active participation in the peaceful and sustainable development of their societies. GCED aims to instill respect for human rights, social justice, gender equality and environmental sustainability, which are fundamental values that help raise the defenses of peace against violent extremism. In line with the understanding of Global Citizenship Education, individual level impacts, which encompasses three domains of learning include: cognitive, social-emotional and behavioural. Cognitive impacts involves critical thinking skills, an understanding of violent extremism and radicalization. Social-emotional impacts relate to the development of a sense of belonging to a common humanity, sharing values and responsibilities, based on human rights. Behavioural impacts relate to encouraging participants to act effectively and responsibly at local, national and global levels for a more peaceful and sustainable world.

==== Media and Information Literacy (MIL) ====
UNESCO has also emphasized the need for Media and Information Literacy (MIL) as increasing terrorist attacks have called attention for more critical approaches to media via MIL and the issue of radicalization has been added to the MIL agenda. According to UNESCO, "MIL can effectively contribute to intercultural dialogue, mutual understanding, peace, promote human rights, freedom of expression, and counter hate, radicalization, and violent extremism." MIL has also been described as a strategy for "reducing demand for extremist content as a means to increase awareness of democracy, pluralism, and peaceful ideas for advancement."

Several formal and informal MIL initiatives have been implemented worldwide based on MIL as a pedagogical practice with a specific set of competences that can deflect narratives of anger and revenge and/or self-realization through violent extremism. These initiatives aim at creating digital counter-narratives that are authentic and reflect youth perceptions of self and others, especially in terms of injustice, felt experiences of discrimination, corruption and abuse by security forces.

=== Pakistan's Sabaoon Project ===
Sabaoon's deradicalization and rehabilitation model

The Sabaoon Project, initiated by the Pakistan Army and run by the Social Welfare Academics and Training organization (SWAaT) since 2009, has been implemented to deradicalize and rehabilitate former militant youth who were involved in violent extremist activities and apprehended by the army in Swat and the surrounding areas in Pakistan. Based on an individualized approach and intervention, the project follows a three-step model (see image).

=== Kenya’s initiatives to address radicalization of youth in educational institutions ===
To tackle the issue of violent extremism and radicalization in schools, the Ministry of Education, Science and Technology of Kenya launched a new national strategy targeting youth in 2014, entitled Initiatives to Address Radicalization of the Youth in Educational Institutions in the Republic of Kenya. The Strategy adopted measures that service the students’ interests and well-being. For example, it includes efforts to create child-friendly school environments and encourages students to participate in “talent academies” to pursue an area of their own interest.

The Strategy also includes the discontinuation of ranking schools based on academic performance. This was to lessen the overemphasis on examinations and to reduce student pressure, incorporating other indicators of student achievement, such as abilities in sport and artistic talent. The purpose is to reduce the stress of students’ lives at home and in school that may be vented through escape tactics, including joining outlawed groups. The Strategy also employs other effective means to prevent violent extremism, including the integration of Preventing of Violent Extremism through Education (PVE-E) in curricula and school programs; adopting a multi-sectoral and multi-stakeholder approach; encouraging student participation through student governance processes and peer-to-peer education; and the involvement of media as a stakeholder.

=== Kenya’s initiatives to address radicalization of community and law enforcement engagement ===
Other than the education project in Kenya, there are other initiatives that strive to respond to the challenge of violent extremism and terrorism. While responding to the drivers, one critical component includes the challenge of profiling and poor relationship between the community and the law enforcement agencies; who are at the forefront, when dealing with violent extremism. Over the years, programs have often assumed the linkage between good relationships between the community, and law enforcement agencies, as a means of preventing violent extremism.

In essence, local communities perceive policies as good or bad, depending on the methods of implementation and practice. Discussions about the challenges associated with the impact of violent extremism and terrorism, especially to those directly affected by attacks, are aware of the importance of security from government agencies including law enforcement. In most cases, however, the process of policy and strategy implementation does more harm than good. The actions from the government as administered by the law enforcement teams over time, serve as a pointer to the never-ending link between violent extremism and the grievance narrative that has fueled the revenge in the communities.

The model developed by Community Together Initiative provided an opportunity to show what works in P/CVE programs. The project stressed community relationships, accountability, reporting, and response; which formed part of the existing structures of conflict management at the community level. CTI-II project focused on the theory of change that; “building relationships with the policing units at the community level while dealing with trauma and unintended actions of both the police and communities, will reduce the susceptibility to radicalization and increase the response to address cases of injustice through conflict management and countering violent extremism while fostering tolerance”.

== Gender disparity ==
While it is being increasingly reported that women play an active role in violent extremist organizations and attacks as assailants and supporters, men are still more often the perpetrators of violent extremist acts and therefore the targets of recruitment campaigns.

Some research suggests, however, that "women are serious candidates for violent radicalization." Although there may be a gender-based distribution of tasks (e.g. especially where participation in combat is involved), this distinction does not apply when it comes to embracing the radical ideology of, or the legitimation of, violent attacks. Some reports reveal that women recognize the same truths and accept the same rules of compliance validated by doctrines as compared to their male counterparts. When they are radicalized, women may appear more indoctrinated than men and more prone to encourage political violence.

=== Online gender issues in religious violent radicalization ===
In spite of the growing presence of radicalized women online, the number of articles devoted to gender and radicalization on social media is very low. One possible explanation may stem from the fact that many women cloak their female identity online, because of a masculinist bias, making them impossible to identify.

Online recruitment functions differently at a distance and reshuffles the roles of men and women alike. One identified trend is a feminist claim of women coming forward to take their place in the fighting, which coincides with a structured use of communication processes by terrorist groups to recruit them. The Internet allows women to move out of relative invisibility, without crossing the limits drawn by their ideology.

== See also ==
=== Related topics ===
- Extremism
  - Deradicalization
  - Far-left extremism
  - Far-right extremism
  - Nonviolent extremism
  - Online youth radicalization
  - Radicalization
- Hate speech and hate groups
  - Online hate speech
- Integralism
- Martyrdom
- Political radicalism
- Political violence
- Religious fanaticism
- Religious nationalism
- Religious violence
- Terrorism
  - Domestic terrorism
  - Left-wing terrorism
  - List of designated terrorist groups
  - Right-wing terrorism
  - Religious terrorism
  - Terrorism financing

=== Specific forms ===
- Christianity and violence
  - Christian fascism
  - Christian fundamentalism
  - Christian terrorism
- Hindutva
  - Hindu terrorism
  - Violence against Christians in India
- Islam and violence
  - Al-Qaeda
  - Boko Haram
  - Hamas
  - Hezbollah
  - Islamic extremism
    - International propagation of Salafism and Wahhabism
  - Islamic fundamentalism
  - Islamic State
  - Islamic terrorism
  - Islamofascism
  - Jihadism
    - Salafi jihadism
  - Sectarian violence among Muslims
  - Taliban
- Judaism and violence
  - Jewish fundamentalism
  - Jewish religious terrorism
  - Kahanism
  - Zionist political violence
- Nihilistic violent extremism

== Sources ==
- This article incorporates text from a free content work. Licensed under CC BY-SA 3.0 IGO (license statement/permission). Text taken from A Teacher’s Guide on the Prevention of Violent Extremism, UNESCO, UNESCO. UNESCO.
- This article incorporates text from a free content work. Licensed under CC BY-SA 3.0 IGO (license statement/permission). Text taken from Preventing violent extremism through education: A guide for policy makers, UNESCO, UNESCO. UNESCO.
- This article incorporates text from a free content work. Licensed under CC BY-SA 3.0 IGO (license statement/permission). Text taken from Youth and violent extremism on social media: mapping the research, 1-167, Séraphin Alava, Divina Frau-Meigs, Ghayda Hassan, UNESCO. UNESCO.
- This article incorporates text from a free content work. Licensed under CC BY-SA 3.0 IGO. Text taken from Preventing violent extremism through education: effective activities and impact; policy brief, UNESCO, UNESCO. UNESCO.
