= Deradicalization =

Process to replace extreme views with moderate ones

Media and Information Literacy: Reinforcing Human Rights, Countering Radicalization and Extremism (Yearbook 2016), a training program on media literacy promoted by UNESCO, UNITWIN Cooperation Programme, UNAOC, and GAPMIL.

Deradicalization refers to a process of encouraging a person with extreme political, social or religious views to adopt more moderate positions on the issues. Deradicalization is commonly described as a process in which individuals or groups undergo a cognitive shift from radical, extremist, or criminal identities toward more moderate or law-abiding perspectives. Scholars distinguish this from disengagement, which refers specifically to changes in outward behavior, such as ceasing to participate in violent or criminal activities, without necessarily altering ideological commitments. This distinction means that a person may disengage from violence while still adhering to extremist beliefs, or conversely, may continue participating in a radical organization without holding strong ideological convictions.

The term deradicalization itself remains inconsistently defined across the academic literature. Researchers have noted parallels with criminological theories of desistance, which examine the processes by which offenders not only cease criminal activity but also adopt new self-understandings. In criminology, this is sometimes differentiated as primary desistance (ending offending behavior) and secondary desistance (taking on the identity of a reformed individual), with the latter involving measurable changes in self-identity and social role.

== Measures and projects ==
Google's think tank Jigsaw has been developing a new program − called the Redirect Method − in which Google's search advertising algorithms and YouTube's video platform are used to target aspiring ISIS recruits and ultimately dissuade them from joining the group.

Machine learning and scientific inquiry can be used to find the most effective contents (such as videos) for deradicalization, to learn why people leave terrorist movements and to identify aspiring violent radicals.

Humera Khan, executive director of the Islamic deradicalization group Muflehu, states that deradicalization also needs human interaction and a supportive community backing up the person's decision to turn away from extremism.

Renee Garfinkel also notes that personal relationships play a major role in the transformation of involvement in violence to non-violent activity, saying "change often hinges on a relationship with a mentor or friend who supports and affirms peaceful behavior".

Many nations and universities are engaging in deradicalization efforts.

== Programmes in Western Europe ==
Multiple Western Europe countries have implemented deradicalization programs in a variety of forms, specifically after September 11, 2001. In more recent years, some countries saw a drastic increases in the number of jihadists attacks, especially France. In September 2016, France opened its first deradicalization centre in Pontourny. The original plan was to have the Pontourny center the first of multiple in the country, however, the Pontourny centre turned out to be a failure. Less than a year after it opened, the deradicalization centre in Pontourny had no residents. Spain launched its prison deradicalization program for jihadists in 2016, and suspended it in 2022, as only four inmates had signed up for it.

== Criticism ==
Sociologist Gérald Bronner calls the notion of "deradicalization" flawed, saying "It means that you can take an idea or a belief out of the brain, and I think that’s just impossible" and instead suggests "not a kind of mental manipulation but the opposite — mind liberation, a strengthening of their intellectual immune systems".

One study found that Islamic State supporters responded to counter-radicalization efforts by censoring expression of pro-IS views and moving their activity from public social media to Telegram, a non publicly viewable medium.

== See also ==
- Global Community Engagement and Resilience Fund
- Targeted advertising
- Filter bubble
- Education in the Middle East and North Africa
- Moderation theory
- Dédiabolisation
- Post-fascism

== Bibliography ==
- Ramakrishna, Kumar. Extremist Islam: Recognition and Response in Southeast Asia. United States, Oxford University Press, 2022.
