= Zeal of the convert =

Fervent devotion to new religious beliefs

The zeal of the convert is a term describing particularly fervent devotion to new beliefs at variance to one's old beliefs.

For example, Paul the Apostle, formerly known as Saul of Tarsus, was a Jewish Pharisee who persecuted Christians until he had a life-changing vision on the road to Damascus and became a missionary who spent his life spreading the religion throughout the Roman Empire and was executed in Rome for his beliefs. As a more recent example, in the United Kingdom, less than 4% of Muslims are converts, while 12% of domestic jihadists are converts. 69% of converts claim that religion is vital to them, compared to 62% of non-converts. 51% of converts worship at least once a week, compared to 44% of non-converts. 82% of converts claim an absolute belief in God, compared to 77% non-converts.

== Use of term ==
The term "zeal of the convert" is commonly used in popular culture to express the view that converts to beliefs are likely to show more devotion than those born in them.

== See also ==
- Apostasy
- Proselytism
- Horseshoe theory
