= List of people with surname Cohen =

This is an alphabetical list of people with surname Cohen (or in a few cases, a double-barrelled surname that includes Cohen). For variant spellings of this name, see the pages for Cohn, Kohn, and Coen.

== A ==
- Aaron Cohen (disambiguation), several people
  - Aaron Cohen (Deputy NASA administrator) (1931–2010)
  - Aaron Cohen (counterterrorist) (born 1976), Israeli-American writer, director, actor and former counterterrorist
  - Aaron Cohen (judoka) (born 1981), American judoka
- Abba Cohen (born 1955–56), American Orthodox Jewish advocate
- Abby Joseph Cohen (born 1952), American economist and financial analyst
- Abe or Abraham Cohen (disambiguation), several people
  - Abe Cohen (1933–2001), American football player
  - Abraham Cohen de Herrera (c. 1570 – c. 1635), Sephardic Jewish philosopher and Kabbalist
  - Abraham Cohen Pimentel (died 1697), Orthodox rabbi (Amsterdam)
  - Abraham Cohen of Zante (1670–1729), physician, poet, rabbi (Venetian Republic)
  - Abraham Cohen Labatt (1802–1899), American pioneer of Reform Judaism
  - Abraham Cohen Bucureşteanu (1840–1877), Romanian poet
  - Abraham Burton Cohen (1882–1956), American civil engineer
  - Abraham Cohen (editor) (1887–1957), rabbinical editor of the Soncino Books of the Bible
  - Abram Cohen (1924–2016), American Olympic fencer
- Ada Cohen, American professor and historian
- Adam Cohen (journalist) (born c. 1962), American journalist at The New York Times
- Adam Cohen (musician) (born 1972), Canadian born musician, the son of Leonard Cohen
- Adam Cohen (scientist) (born 1979), associate professor of chemistry and chemical biology and of physics at Harvard University
- Adele Cohen (born 1942), American lawyer and politician
- Adva Cohen (אדוה כהן; born 1996), Israeli runner
- Aharon Cohen (1910–1980), Russian Empire-born, senior member of Mapam (Israeli political party)
- Al Cohen (1926–2020), American magic shop owner and practitioner
- Alan N. Cohen (1930–2004), American former co-owner of the Boston Celtics and the New Jersey Nets
- Alan Cohen (born 1954), American owner of the Florida Panthers
- Albert Cohen (disambiguation), several people
  - Albert Cohen (novelist) (1895–1981), Greek-born Romaniote Jewish Swiss novelist
  - Albert Cohen (actor) (1932–2025), Israeli actor, theatre director and singer
  - Albert D. Cohen (1914–2011), Canadian businessman
  - Albert J. Cohen (1903–1984), American film producer
  - Albert K. Cohen (1918–2014), American sociologist
  - Albert Cohen (producer), French producer of musicals and radio personality
- Alex Cohen, American radio dj, roller derby skater and author
- Alexis Cohen, American Idol contestant
- Alfred M. Cohen (1859–1949), American lawyer and politician
- Alice Cohen, American singer-songwriter and artist
- Allen Cohen (poet) (1940–2004), editor of the San Francisco Oracle
- Allen Cohen (composer) (born 1951), American composer
- Almog Cohen (footballer) (born 1988), Israeli international association footballer
- Alon Cohen (born 1962), Israeli communications executive
- Alroey Cohen (born 1989), Israeli international footballer
- Amnon Cohen (born 1960), Israeli politician
- Amy Cohen-Corwin, American mathematician
- Anat Cohen, Israeli jazz clarinetist, saxophonist and bandleader
- Andrew and Andy Cohen (disambiguation), several people
  - Andrew Cohen (colonial governor) (1909–1968), governor of Uganda
  - Andrew Cohen (journalist) (born 1955), Canadian journalist and author
  - Andrew Cohen (spiritual teacher) (1955–2025), American spiritual teacher and author
  - Andrew Cohen (politician) (born 1969), American politician in New York City
  - Andrew Cohen (poker player) (born c. 1969), American bartender and poker player
  - Andrew Cohen (footballer) (born 1981), Maltese international footballer
    - Andy Cohen (baseball) (1904–1988), New York Giant player
    - Andy Cohen (television personality) (born 1968), American television executive and pop culture blogger
- Anne Cohen (born 1941), Australian politician in New South Wales
- Annie Cohen-Solal, French academic and writer
- Anthony Cohen (born 1946), British social anthropologist
- Ari Cohen, Canadian actor
- Ariel Cohen (born 1959), Soviet-born American political scientist
- Arnaldo Cohen (born 1948), Brazilian pianist
- Arthur Cohen (disambiguation), several people
  - Arthur Cohen (politician) (1830–1914), English barrister and Liberal Party politician
  - Arthur Juda Cohen (1910–2000), leading member of the Dutch Underground resistance movement
  - Arthur A. Cohen (1928–1986), American Jewish scholar, theologian and author
  - Arthur G. Cohen (1930–2014), American businessman and philanthropist
- Asher Cohen, psychologist and President of the Hebrew University of Jerusalem
- Asi Cohen (born 1974), Israeli comedian
- Assaf Cohen (born 1972), American actor
- Audra Cohen (born 1986), American 2007 NCAA Women's Tennis Singles Champion
- Audrey Cohen (1931–1996), founding president of the Metropolitan College of New York
- Avi Cohen (1956–2010), Israeli international footballer
- Avi Cohen (footballer, born 1962) (born 1962), Israeli international footballer
- Avishai Cohen (bassist) (born 1970), Israeli jazz bassist, composer, and arranger
- Avishai Cohen (trumpeter) (born 1978), Israeli/American jazz trumpeter and composer
- Avishay Cohen (born 1995), Israeli footballer
- Avner Cohen, Israeli/American historian and author

== B ==
- B. J. Cohen (born 1975), American footballer
- Barry Cohen (1927–1985), birth name of Barry Crane, American television director and producer
- Barry Cohen (politician) (1935–2017), Australian cabinet level politician
- Barry Cohen (attorney) (1939–2018), American lawyer
- Barry Marc Cohen (born 1954), American art therapist
- Ben and Benjamin Cohen (disambiguation), several people
  - Ben Cohen (bridge) (1907–1971), British bridge player and writer
  - Ben Cohen (businessman) (born 1951), co-founder of Ben & Jerry's ice cream
  - Ben Cohen (rugby union) (born 1978), English rugby union international player
    - Sir Benjamin Cohen, 1st Baronet (1844–1909), British politician and Jewish communal leader, MP for Islington East, 1892–1906
    - Benjamin Victor Cohen (1894–1983), American political figure, member of President Franklin D. Roosevelt's Brain Trust
    - Benjamin Cohen (political economist) (born 1937), American professor of International Political Economy
    - Benjamin Cohen (born 1972), French musician known as Benjamin Diamond
    - Benjamin Cohen (journalist) (born 1982), British journalist and Channel 4 news correspondent
- Bennett Cohen (1890–1964), American screenwriter
- Benyamin Cohen (born 1975), American journalist and author
- Bern Cohen (born 1949), American actor
- Bernard Cohen (disambiguation), several people
  - Bernard Cohen (physicist) (1924–2012), American physics professor
  - Bernard Cecil Cohen (1926–2024), American political scientist and educator
  - Bernard Cohen (painter) (born 1933), British artist
  - Bernard S. Cohen (1934–2020), American politician in Virginia
  - Bernard Cohen (Australian author) (born 1963), Australian writer
- Betty Cohen, American businesswoman
- Bobby Cohen (born 1970), American film producer
- Bonnie R. Cohen, American public servant
- Boyd Cohen (born 1970), American urban and climate strategist
- Brad Cohen, American motivational speaker and author
- Bram Cohen (born 1975), American computer programmer
- Brian Cohen (boxer) (born 1976), American professional boxer (retired)
- Bruce M. Cohen (1945–2010), American rabbi and peace campaigner
- Bruce M. Cohen (1945–2010), American rabbi and peace campaigner
- Bruce Cohen (born 1961), American film producer
- Sir Brunel Cohen (1886–1965), British Conservative Party politician, Member of Parliament for Liverpool Fairfield 1918–1931
- Bryan Cohen (born 1989), American-Israeli basketball player
- Brian Tyler Cohen, American actor, blogger, podcaster and journalist

== C ==
- Carl Cohen (1931–2023), American philosopher
- Carl Cohen (1913–1986), American gambling executive and casino manager
- Carol Fishman Cohen, American CEO, author, speaker and consultant
- Carolyn Cohen (1929–2017), American biologist and biophysicist
- Cathy J. Cohen (born 1962), American author
- Chapman Cohen (1868–1954), English freethinker, secularist, atheist, writer, and lecturer
- Charles S. Cohen (born 1952), American real estate developer
- Charles Cohen, American free jazz musician and composer
- Chris Cohen (musician) (born 1975), American musician
- Chris Cohen (footballer) (born 1987), English footballer
- Claude Cohen-Tannoudji (1933–2026), French physicist
- Claudia Cohen (1950–2007), American gossip columnist and socialite
- Colby Cohen (born 1989), American ice hockey player
- Cora Cohen (1943–2023), American artist
- Craig Cohen (broadcaster) (born 1972), American radio broadcaster
- Craig Cohen (political scientist) (born 1974), American political scientist

== D ==
- Dan, Daniel and Danny Cohen (disambiguation), several people
  - Dan Cohen (politician) (born 1936), American author and politician
  - Dan Cohen (academic), American historian
    - Daniel Cohen (children's writer) (1936–2018), American writer
    - Daniel Cohen (economist) (born 1953), French economist
    - Daniel Cohen (conductor) (born 1984), Israeli Music director of Jersey Chamber Orchestra
    - Daniel I. A. Cohen (born 1946), American mathematician and computer scientist
    - Danielle Cohen-Levinas (born 1959), French musicologist and philosopher
      - Danny Cohen (television executive) (born 1974), director of BBC Television
      - Danny Cohen (cinematographer), British cinematographer
      - Danny Cohen (engineer), American computer scientist
- Dave and David Cohen (disambiguation), several people
  - Dave Cohen (sportscaster) (born 1951), American sportscaster and actor
  - Dave Cohen (American football) (born 1966), American college football coach
  - David Cohen (military) (1917–2020), American member of the US Army, a liberator of the Ohrdruf concentration camp, and a schoolteacher
  - Dave Cohen (writer), writer for television, radio and the Huffington Post
    - David Cohen Nassy (1612–1685), Portuguese converso and colonialist
    - David Jacob Cohen (c. 1883–1959), Indian politician
    - David Cohen (rabbi) (1887–1972), Rabbi, talmudist, philosopher, and kabbalist
    - David Cohen (politician) (1914–2005), American politician in Philadelphia
    - David B. Cohen (psychologist) (1941–2004), American psychology professor
    - David Bennett Cohen (born 1942), keyboardist
    - David William Cohen (born 1943), American professor of history and anthropology
    - David B. Cohen (mayor) (born 1947), American politician in Massachusetts
    - David Mark Cohen (1952–1997), playwriting professor at the University of Texas at Austin
    - David Elliot Cohen (born 1955), American editor and publisher
    - David Cohen (art critic) (born 1963), American art critic, art historian, curator and publisher
    - David X. Cohen (born 1966), American TV writer and producer
    - David Steven Cohen (1967–2025), American TV writer
    - David Cohen (entrepreneur) (born 1968), American entrepreneur
    - David Cohen (intelligence), New York City Police Department deputy commissioner, former CIA official
    - David Cohen (physicist), Canadian M.I.T. physicist
    - David L. Cohen, Pennsylvania politician
- Dick Cohen (born 1949), American politician in Minnesota
- Dolly Cohen, French jewellery designer
- Donald Atherton Cohen (1870–1943), American ornithologist
- Donald J. Cohen (1940–2001), American psychiatrist and psychoanalyst
- Douglas J. Cohen, American composer/lyricist
- Dror Cohen (basketball) (born 1974), Israeli basketball coach and former player

== E ==
- E.G.D. Cohen (1923–2017), Dutch/American physicist
- Ed Cohen, American sportscaster
- Edward Cohen (1822–1877), Australian merchant and Mayor of Melbourne
- Elaine Lustig Cohen (1927–2016), American graphic designer, artist and activist
- Eli Cohen (disambiguation), several people
  - Eli Cohen (1924–1965), Israeli spy executed by Syria
  - Eli Cohen (actor) (born 1940), Israeli film actor and director
  - Eli Cohen (politician born 1949), Israeli politician of the Likud party
  - Eli Cohen (footballer born 1951), Israeli football player and manager
  - Eli Cohen (footballer born 1961), Israeli football player and manager
  - Eli Cohen (politician born 1972), Israeli politician representing Kulanu
- Eliad Cohen (born 1988), Israeli model and actor
- Elie Aron Cohen (1909–1993), Dutch doctor, author and Auschwitz survivor
- Eliezer Cohen (born 1934), Israeli politician
- Eliot A. Cohen (born 1956), American professor of strategic studies
- Elizabeth D. A. Cohen (1820–1921), first female doctor in Louisiana
- Elizabeth Cohen, American TV journalist
- Ellen Naomi Cohen (1941–1974), American singer better known as "Mama" Cass or Cass Elliot
- Ellen Cohen (born 1940), American politician in Texas
- Elliot E. Cohen (1899–1959), American magazine editor
- Emil Cohen (1842–1905), German mineralogist
- Emil Cohen (comedian) (1911–2000), American comedian and singer
- Emma Cohen (1946–2016), Spanish actress, director, producer and screenwriter
- Emmet Cohen (born 1990), American jazz pianist
- Emory Cohen (born 1990), American actor
- Erin Cohen (born 1973), American actress whose stage name is Erin Daniels
- Erminie Cohen (1926–2019), Canadian senator for Saint John, New Brunswick
- Ernst Julius Cohen (1869–1944), Dutch chemist
- Esther Cohen (born 1949), Mexican writer and academic
- Etan Cohen (born 1974), American screenwriter and director
- Ethan Cohen (gallerist) (born 1961), American collector and art dealer
- Eugene D. Cohen (born 1946), American lawyer and writer
- Evan Montvel Cohen (born 1966), American businessman from Guam; founder of Air America Radio
- Evelyn M. Cohen, American art historian

== F ==
- Felix S. Cohen (1907–1953), American lawyer and legal scholar
- Floris Cohen (born 1946), Dutch science historian
- Flossie Cohen (1925–2004), Indian-born pediatric immunologist
- Frank Cohen (born 1943), British entrepreneur
- Fred Cohen (born 1956), American computer scientist
- Freddie Cohen (born 1957), British businessman and former Jersey politician
- Fritz Cohen (1904–1967), German composer

== G ==
- Gabriel Cohen (born 1991), Israeli footballer
- Gal Cohen (born 1982), Israeli footballer
- Gal Cohen Groumi (born 2002), Israeli Olympic swimmer
- Gary Cohen (born 1958), American sportscaster
- Gary Cohen (footballer) (born 1984), English footballer
- Gary G. Cohen, American theologian
- Gavriel Cohen (1928–2021), Israeli academic and politician
- George Cohen (artist) (1919–1999), American painter and art professor
- George Getzel Cohen (born 1927), South African physician and politician
- George Cohen (1939–2022), English football international and World Cup winner
- George H. Cohen, American director of the Federal Mediation and Conciliation Service
- Gerald Cohen (1941–2009), Canadian-born British professor of political theory
- Gerald Cohen (composer) (born 1960), American composer
- Gerry Cohen (director), American television director
- Geulah Cohen (1925–2019), Israeli politician and journalist
- Gezi Cohen (born 1938), Israeli Olympic weightlifter
- Gideon Cohen, Israeli football player and manager
- Gil Cohen (disambiguation), several people
- Gili Cohen (born 1991), Israeli Olympic judoka
- Glen Cohen, Jamaican-born British Olympic 400 m runner
- Graeme Cohen, Australian mathematician
- Greg Cohen (born 1953), American jazz bassist

== H ==
- H. Rodgin Cohen (born 1944), American lawyer
- Hannah Cohen (philanthropist) (1875–1946), English civil servant and philanthropist
- Hannah Cohen (singer) (born 1986), American singer and model
- Harlan Cohen (1934–2020), American volleyball coach
- Harlan G. Cohen, the Gabriel M. Wilner/UGA Foundation Professor in International Law at University of Georgia
- Harriet Cohen (1895–1967), British pianist
- Harold Cohen (politician) (1881–1946), Australian politician in Victoria, and brigadier
- Harold Cohen (artist) (1928–2016), British-born American-based artist
- Harry Cohen (born 1949), Labour Party politician in the United Kingdom
- Haskell Cohen (1914–2000), American sports writer and basketball official
- Haylynn Cohen (born 1980), American model
- Henri and Henry Cohen (disambiguation). several people
  - Henri Cohen (composer) (1808–1880), French music theorist and composer
  - Henri Cohen (water polo) (died 1930), Belgian water polo athlete
  - Henri Cohen (number theorist) (born 1947), French mathematician
    - Henry Cohen (numismatist) (1806–1880), French numismatist, bibliographer and composer
    - Henry Cohen (rabbi) (1863–1952), rabbi in Galveston, Texas, 1888–1952
    - Henry Cohen, 1st Baron Cohen of Birkenhead (1900–1977), British physician, doctor and lecturer
    - Henry Cohen (civil servant) (1922–1999), director of Föhrenwald
- Herb and Herbert Cohen (disambiguation), several people
  - Herb Cohen (1932–2010), American personal manager, record company executive and music publisher
  - Herb Cohen (negotiator), American negotiation expert
  - Herbert B. Cohen (1900–1970), American judge and politician in Pennsylvania
  - Herbert Cohen (fencer) (born 1940), American 2x Olympic foil fencer
- Herman and Hermann Cohen (disambiguation), several people
  - Herman Cohen (1925–2002), American movie producer
  - Herman Jay Cohen (born 1932), American diplomat
    - Hermann Cohen (Carmelite) (1820–1871), Jewish pianist and Carmelite priest
    - Hermann Cohen (1842–1918), German philosopher
- Hillel Cohen (born 1961), Israeli scholar and author on Arab-Jewish relations
- Horace Cohen (born 1971), Dutch actor and comedian
- Howard Cohen, birth name of Howard Cosell, American sportscaster
- Hy Cohen (1931–2021), American baseball player

== I ==
- I. Bernard Cohen (1914–2003), American historian of science
- I. Glenn Cohen (born 1978), Canadian professor of law
- Ian Cohen (born 1951), Australian politician in New South Wales
- Ilana Cohen (born 1943), Israeli politician
- Ira Cohen (1935–2011), American filmmaker, poet, and photographer
- Irvin S. Cohen (1917–1955), American mathematician
- Irun Cohen (born 1937), American-born Israeli immunologist
- Irwin Cohen (1952–2012), American Olympic judoka
- Irwin Cohen (developer), American real estate developer
- Israel Cohen (footballer) (born 1971), Israeli footballer and amateur basketball player
- Itzik Cohen (footballer, born 1983), Israeli football international
- Itzik Cohen (footballer born 1990), Israeli footballer
- Izhar Cohen (born 1951), Israeli singer

== J ==
- J. J. Cohen (born 1965), American actor
- J. M. Cohen (1903–1989), British writer and translator of European literature
- Jack Cohen (disambiguation), several people
  - Jack Cohen (businessman) (1898–1979), British businessman
  - Jack Cohen (rabbi) (1919–2012), American Reconstructionist rabbi
  - Jack Cohen (scientist) (1933–2019), British biologist and special effects consultant
- Jacob Cohen (disambiguation), several people
  - Jacob Raphael Cohen (1738–1811), Jewish minister in England, Canada, and the United States
  - Jacob I. Cohen Jr. (1789–1869), Baltimore banker and Jewish-rights activist
  - Jack Cohen (businessman) (1898–1979), supermarket founder born Jacob Kohen
  - Jacob Cohen (1921–2004), birth name of American comedian Rodney Dangerfield
  - Jacob Cohen (statistician) (1923–1998), U.S. statistician and psychologist
  - Jacob Cohen (footballer) (born 1956), Israeli international footballer
  - Jacob Cohen (scientist), American scientist at NASA Ames Research Centre
- Jacques Cohen (embryologist) (born 1951), Dutch embryologist
- Jacques Cohen (computer science), American computer scientist
- Jake Cohen (born 1990), American/Israeli professional basketball player
- James Cohen (1906–1958), English Olympic athlete
- Janet Neel Cohen, Baroness Cohen of Pimlico (born 1940), British lawyer and crime fiction author
- Jared Cohen (born 1981), American political advisor and Google director
- Jason Cohen, filmmaker
- Javion Cohen (born 2002), American football player
- Jay M. Cohen (born 1945), U.S. government official
- Jay S. Cohen (born 1968), American internet gambling executive
- Jean Cohen (1941–2004), French virologist
- Jean L. Cohen (born 1946), American political scientist
- Jean-Louis Cohen (born 1949), French architect
- Jean-Michel Cohen (born 1959), French nutritionist and author
- Jeff and Jeffrey Cohen (disambiguation), several people
  - Jeff Cohen (basketball) (1939–1978), American professional basketball player
  - Jeff Cohen (songwriter) (born 1966), American songwriter, producer and publisher
  - Jeff Cohen (actor) (born 1974), American attorney and former child actor
  - Jeff Cohen (media critic), American founder of Fairness & Accuracy In Reporting
  - Jeff Cohen (playwright and theater director), American theater director, playwright and producer
    - Jeffrey A. Cohen (born 1954), American neurologist
    - Jeffrey H. Cohen (born 1962), American anthropologist
- Jem Cohen (born 1962), American filmmaker
- Jennifer Cohen (athletic director), American athletics administrator
- Jennifer Cohen (fitness) (born 1975), American fitness instructor and TV personality
- Jerome A. Cohen (1930–2025), American professor of law and Chinese human rights advocate
- Jim Cohen (baseball) (1918–2002), American baseball player
- Jim Cohen (born 1942), American human rights and environmental activist
- Joanna Cohen, American TV soap opera writer
- Joanna Waley-Cohen (born 1952), American professor of history
- Job Cohen (born 1947), Dutch politician
- Jody Cohen (born 1954), American rabbi
- Joe Cohen (born 1984), US American and Canadian football player
- Joel Cohen (disambiguation), several people
  - Joel Cohen (musician) (born 1942), American musician specializing in early music repertoires
  - Joel Ephraim Cohen (born 1944), American mathematical biologist
  - Joel Cohen (writer), American screenwriter
  - Joel H. Cohen, Canadian TV writer for The Simpsons
- John Cohen (disambiguation), several people
  - John Cohen (Australian politician) (1859–1939), Australian politician and judge
  - John S. Cohen (1870–1935), U.S. Senator from Georgia
  - John Cohen (musician) (1932–2019), American folk musician and photographer/filmmaker
  - John Cohen (baseball) (born 1966), American college baseball coach
- Jon and Jonathan Cohen (disambiguation), several people
  - Jon Cohen (entrepreneur) (born 1968), American music and media executive
  - Jon Cohen (physician), American physician
  - Jon Cohen (writer), American novelist and screenwriter
    - Jonathan Cohen (conductor) (born 1977), British conductor and cellist
    - Jonathan Cohen (musician), British musician, well known from children's television programmes
    - Jonathan Cohen (television executive), American television executive
    - Jonathan Cohen (actor), French actor
- Jordan Cohen (born 1997), American-Israeli basketball player in the Israel Basketball Premier League
- Joseph Cohen (1891–1973), Canadian lawyer, academic and politician in Quebec
- Josh and Joshua Cohen (disambiguation), several people
  - Josh Cohen (tennis), American tennis coach
    - Joshua Lionel Cohen (1877–1965), birth name of Joshua Lionel Cowen, toy train magnate
    - Joshua Cohen (philosopher) (born 1951), American philosopher
    - Joshua J. Cohen (born 1973), mayor of Annapolis, Maryland
    - Joshua Cohen (writer) (born 1980), American writer
- Joyce Cohen (politician) (born 1937), American politician in Oregon
- Judith Solomon Cohen (1766–1837), matriarch of Baltimore family
- Judy Kay Cohen (born 1952), American singer known as Juice Newton
- Julia Cohen (born 1989), American tennis player
- Julie E. Cohen, American legal scholar in intellectual property and Internet law
- Julius B. Cohen (1859–1935), English chemist
- June Cohen, American executive producer for TED Media

== K ==
- Kalman J. Cohen (c. 1932–2010), American economist
- Kay Cohen (born 1952), Australian fashion designer
- Kerry Cohen (born 1970), American author
- Kip Cohen, American arts and entertainment executive

== L ==
- Landon Cohen (born 1986), American football defensive tackle
- Larry, Laurence and Lawrence Cohen (disambiguation), several people
  - Larry Cohen (1941–2019), American film producer, director, and screenwriter
  - Larry T. Cohen (1943–2016), American bridge player
  - Larry Cohen (bridge) (born 1959), American bridge player and writer
  - Larry Cohen (union leader), American union leader
  - Larry Cohen (soccer) (born 1987), South African footballer
    - Laurence Jonathan Cohen (1923–2006), British philosopher
      - Lawrence D. Cohen (politician) (1933–2016), American politician
      - Lawrence D. Cohen, American screenwriter
- Laura Jane Cohen, American politician
- Lea Cohen (born 1942), Bulgarian author and diplomat
- Leah Hager Cohen, American author
- Leon Cohen (1910–1989), Greek-born author and Auschwitz survivor
- Leonard Cohen (1934–2016), Canadian singer-songwriter and author
- Léonce Cohen (1829–1901), French composer
- Lesley Cohen (politician) (born 1970), American lawyer and politician in Nevada
- Lester Cohen (1901–1963), American author
- Lewis Cohen (cardmaker) (1800–1868), English-born American: major player in the playing card business
- Lewis Cohen (mayor) (1849–1933), South Australian politician and several times mayor of Adelaide
- Lewis Cohen, Baron Cohen of Brighton (1897–1966), British politician
- Liat Cohen, Franco-Israeli classical guitarist
- Liepmann Cohen (c. 1630–1714, also known as Leffmann Behrends), German financial agent of the dukes and princes of Hanover
- Lionel Louis Cohen (1832–1887), English financier, politician, and communal worker
- Lionel Cohen, Baron Cohen (1888–1973), British law lord
- Liran Cohen (born 1983), Israeli footballer
- Lisa R. Cohen, Canadian-born American news magazine producer
- Liskula Cohen (born 1972), Canadian-born New York-based model
- Lita Indzel Cohen (born 1940), American politician in Pennsylvania
- Liz Cohen (born 1973), American performance artist
- Lizabeth Cohen, American historian
- Lona Cohen (1913–1992), American-born spy for the U.S.S.R
- Lorenzo Cohen (born 1964), Italian-born cancer specialist in the U.S.
- Louis Cohen (conductor) (c. 1893–1956), English violinist and conductor
- Louis Cohen (1904–1939), American gangster
- Lucy Kramer Cohen (1907–2007), American anthropologist
- Lynn Cohen (1933–2020), American actress
- Lynne Cohen (1944–2014), American-Canadian photographer
- Lyor Cohen (born 1959), American music industry executive

== M ==
- Malia Cohen (born 1977), American elected official in San Francisco, California
- Mandy Cohen, American physician and Director of the U.S. Centers for Disease Control and Prevention
- Marc Cohn (born 1959), American singer-songwriter
- Mark B. Cohen (born 1949), Pennsylvania state legislator
- Martin Cohen (soccer) (born 1952), South African footballer
- Marvin L. Cohen (born 1935), American physicist
- Mary Ann Cohen, birth name of Mary Ann Magnin (1850–1943), co-founder of I. Magnin clothing store
- Mary M. Cohen (1854–1911; pen name, Coralie), American social economist, writer
- Matt Cohen (actor) (born 1982), American film and television actor
- Matt Cohen (writer) (1942–1999), Canadian writer under the pseudonym Teddy Jam
- Maurice Cohen (1927–2006), Israeli post office manager
- Maury M. Cohen (1913–1979), American filmmaker
- Melissa Batya Cohen, South African-American activist and filmmaker
- Mendes Cohen (1796–1879), American politician, traveler and businessman
- Michael Cohen (disambiguation), several people
- Michal Lamdani Cohen (born 1944), Israeli Olympic high jumper
- Mickey Cohen (1913–1976), American gangster in 1940s and 1950s
- Morris Cohen (disambiguation), several people
  - Morris Cohen (adventurer) (1887–1970), British-born adventurer and bodyguard for Sun Yat-sen
  - Morris Cohen (American metallurgist) (1911–2005), American metallurgist
  - Morris Cohen (Soviet spy) (1910–1995), Soviet spy
  - Morris Raphael Cohen (1880–1947), American Jewish philosopher
- Moses Cohen (15th century), German Jewish writer
- Myra Cohen (disambiguation), several people
- Myron Cohen (1902–1986), American comedian and raconteur

== N ==
- Naomi Goldstein Cohen (1930-2022), scholar of Jewish thought and feminist
- Natalie Cohen (born 1989), birth name of Madame Mayhem, American singer/songwriter
- Nathan Cohen (rower) (born 1986), New Zealand rower
- Nick Cohen, British journalist and author
- Nick Cohen (filmmaker), British film director, producer, actor and screenwriter
- Nina Cohen (1907–1991), Canadian philanthropist
- Noa Cohen (born 2002), Israeli actress and model
- Nudie Cohn (1902–1984), Ukrainian-American tailor and designer

== O ==
- Octavus Roy Cohen (1891–1959), American writer and author
- Ohad Cohen, Israeli footballer
- Osher Cohen (born 1998), Israeli musician

== P ==
- Paul Cohen (disambiguation), several people
  - Paul Cohen (mathematician) (1934–2007), American mathematician
  - Paul Cohen (saxophonist), American saxophonist
- Pierre Cohen, French politician
- Sir Philip Cohen (b. 1945), British biochemist
- Philip P. Cohen, American chemist and researcher

== R ==
- Ralph Louis Cohen (born 1952), American mathematician
- Rafi Cohen (born 1965), Israeli soccer player and coach
- Ran Cohen, Israeli politician
- Randy Cohen, American writer and humorist
- Raphael H. Cohen (born 1953), Swiss professor of economics and author
- Raymond Cohen (1919–2011), British violinist
- H. Reuben Cohen (1921–2014), Canadian businessman, educator, and lawyer
- Richard Cohen (disambiguation), several people
  - Richard A. Cohen (born 1952), American lecturer on conversion therapy
  - Richard I. Cohen, Israeli professor of Jewish history
  - Richard Cohen (columnist), American syndicated columnist for the Washington Post
  - Richard E. Cohen, American magazine correspondent
  - Richard M. Cohen (1948–2024), American journalist, television producer, and author
- Rob Cohen, American film director, producer and writer
- Robert Cohen (boxer) (1930–2022), French and Algerian boxer
- Robert Cohen (cellist), British cellist
- Robert Cohen (writer), Canadian comedy writer
- Robert Donald Cohen (1933–2014), British physician
- Roger Cohen (born 1955), British-born journalist and author
- Ronald A. Cohen (born 1955), American neuropsychologist
- Ronni Cohen, birth name of Ronni Chasen (1946–2010), American publicist
- Ryosuke Cohen (born 1948), Japanese mail artist

== S ==
- Sacha Baron Cohen (born 1971), English actor and comedian
- Samuel Cohen (disambiguation), several people
- Sandy Cohen (born 1995), American-Israeli basketball player in the Israeli Basketball Premier League
- Sarah Jacob Cohen (1923–2019), Cochin Jewish hand embroidery artist
- Sasha Cohen (born 1984), American figure skater
- Saul B. Cohen, American human geographer
- Scott Cohen (actor), American actor
- Shaughnessy Cohen, Canadian politician
- She'ar Yashuv Cohen (1927-2016) Chief Ashkenazi Rabbi of Haifa, Israel
- Sheldon S. Cohen (1927–2018), American lawyer
- Sherm Cohen, American storyboard artist, and television writer and director best known for his work on SpongeBob SquarePants and Fish Hooks
- Sidney Cohen (1910–1987), American psychiatrist and medical school professor
- Sidney M. Cohen, Canadian television director and program creator
- Sharon Cohen, Israeli singer better known under the stage name Dana International
- Shimon Cohen, Israeli footballer
- Simcha Bunim Cohen, Orthodox rabbi and author
- Simon Baron-Cohen, British psychologist
- Spenser Cohen, American screenwriter
- Stanley Cohen (disambiguation), several people
- Stéphanie Cohen-Aloro (born 1983), French tennis player
- Steve Cohen (judoka) (born 1955), American Olympic judoka
- Steven A. Cohen, American hedge fund investor
- Stephen F. Cohen, American scholar of Russian studies
- Stephen M. Cohen, American convicted for internet-related frauds
- Steve Cohen, member of the US House of Representatives for Tennessee
- Steven Cohen (footballer), French-Israeli professional association footballer
- Stuart David Cohen (1941–1982), American singer-songwriter known as David Blue
- Syd Cohen, American Major League Baseball pitcher

== T ==
- Taika David Cohen (Born 1975), New Zealand filmmaker, actor and comedian
- Tamir Cohen (born 1984), Israeli soccer midfielder (Bolton Wanderers & Israeli national team)
- Tanhum Cohen-Mintz (1939–2014), Latvian-born Israeli basketball player
- Tanner Cohen, American actor and singer
- Tarik Cohen, American football player
- Tiffany Cohen (born 1966), American swimmer
- Tim Cohen, American musician
- Treyc Cohen, X Factor finalist

== U ==
- Uri Cohen-Mintz (born 1973), Israeli basketball player

== V ==
- Victor Cohen Hadria (born 1949), French Writer

== W ==
- Warren I. Cohen (1934 or 1935–2025), American historian
- William Cohen, politician and former U.S. Secretary of Defense
- William N. Cohen (1857–1938), American lawyer and judge

== Y ==
- Ya'akov Cohen (born 1953), Israeli rabbi and politician
- Ya'akov Cohen (writer) (1881–1960), Israeli writer
- Yael Cohen (born 1986), Canadian Activist
- Yehoshua Cohen (1922–1986), Israeli militant and assassin
- Yoav Cohen (born 1999), Israeli Olympic windsurfer
- Yohanan Cohen (1917–2013), Israeli politician and diplomat
- Yonatan Cohen, Israeli football player
- Yoseph Bar-Cohen, physicist
- Yousef Hamadani Cohen, spiritual leader and chief rabbi for the Jewish community in Iran

== Z ==
- Zion Cohen, Israeli footballer

== Fictional characters ==
- Baruch Cohen, original name of fictional character Billy Joe Cobra from Dude, That's My Ghost!
- Brian Cohen, fictional character from Monty Python's Life of Brian
- Cohen the Barbarian, fictional character in Terry Pratchett's Discworld novels
- Kirsten Cohen, fictional character on the FOX television series The O.C.
- Mark Cohen (Rent), fictional character in the rock opera Rent
- Max Cohen, fictional character in Darren Aronofsky's film Pi
- Sander Cohen, fictional musician in the video game BioShock
- Sandy Cohen, fictional character on the FOX television series The O.C.
- Seth Cohen, fictional character on the TV show The O.C.
- Tina Cohen-Chang, fictional character on the FOX television series Glee

== See also ==
- Baron-Cohen
- George Cohen, Sons and Company, a scrap metal merchant in London
- Harold Cohen Library, University of Liverpool's library
