= Abraham Cohen =

Abraham Cohen may refer to:

- Abraham Cohen de Herrera (c. 1570–c. 1635), religious philosopher and Kabbalist (Amsterdam)
- Abraham Cohen Pimentel (died 1697), Orthodox rabbi (Amsterdam)
- Abraham Cohen of Zante (1670–1729), physician, poet, rabbi (Venetian Republic)
- Abraham ben Samuel Cohen of Lask (died 1799), Jewish ascetic
- Abraham Cohen Labatt (1802–1899), American pioneer of Reform Judaism
- Abraham Cohen Bucureșteanu (1840–1877), Romanian poet
- Abraham Burton Cohen (1882–1956), American civil engineer
- Abraham Cohen (editor) (1887–1957), rabbinical editor of the Soncino Books of the Bible
- Abe Cohen (Abraham Cohen, 1933–2001), American football player

== See also ==
- Abraham Cohn (1832–1897), American Civil War soldier and Medal of Honor recipient
- Abraham Kohn (1807–1848), Chief Reform Rabbi of Lemberg (now Lviv)
