= P. Cohen =

P. Cohen may refer to:

- Patrick Cohen, actor featured in the webseries, We Need Girlfriends
- Patrick Cohen, pianist featured in performances with Austrian string quartet Quatuor Mosaïques
- Paul Cohen (disambiguation)
- Peter Cohen (disambiguation)
  - Peter Cohen (director)
- Philip Cohen (disambiguation)
- Pierre Cohen, French politician
