= Michael D. Cohen =

Michael D. Cohen may refer to:

- Michael D. Cohen (academic) (1945–2013), professor of complex systems, information and public policy at the University of Michigan
- Michael D. Cohen (actor) (born 1975), Canadian actor
- Michael Cohen (lawyer) (Michael Dean Cohen), American lawyer, known for being a "fixer" for U.S. president Donald Trump

== See also ==
- Michael Cohen (disambiguation)
