= Donald Cohen =

Donald Cohen may refer to:

- Donald J. Cohen (1940–2001), American psychiatrist and psychoanalyst
- Donald Atherton Cohen (1870–1943), Californian ornithologist and bird conservationist
