= Herman Cohen (disambiguation) =

Herman Cohen (1925–2002) was an American film producer.

Herman or Hermann Cohen may also refer to:

- Herman Jay Cohen (born 1932), American diplomat
- Hermann Cohen (1842–1918), German-Jewish philosopher
- Hermann Cohen (Carmelite) (1820–1871), Jewish pianist and Carmelite priest
