= Arthur Cohen =

Arthur Cohen may refer to:

- Arthur Cohen (politician) (1830–1914), English barrister and Liberal Party politician
- Arthur Juda Cohen (1910–2000), leading member of the Dutch Underground resistance movement
- Arthur A. Cohen (1928–1986), American Jewish scholar, theologian and author
- Arthur G. Cohen (1930–2014), American businessman and philanthropist
