= Michael Cohen =

Michael Cohen or Mike Cohen may refer to:

== Arts and entertainment ==
- Michael D. Cohen (actor) (born 1975), Canadian actor
- Michael Cohen (American musician) (1951–1997), 1970s singer-songwriter
- Michaël Cohen (born 1970), French actor
- Michael Cohen (Israeli musician) (born 1986), Israeli rapper and record producer

== Education ==
- Michael A. Cohen, director of the graduate program in International Affairs at The New School
- Michael D. Cohen (academic) (1945–2013), professor of complex systems, information and public policy at the University of Michigan
- Michael Cohen, regent of the University of California

== Law ==
- Michael Cohen (lawyer) (born 1966), American former attorney who was U.S. president Donald Trump's personal lawyer
- Michael H. Cohen, American attorney, professor, and author

== Science and technology ==
- Michael Cohen (doctor) (1937–2018), doctor of dental medicine who first identified Proteus syndrome
- Michael Cohen (pharmacist), president of the Institute for Safe Medication Practices
- Michael Cohen (physicist), American condensed matter physicist and professor
- Michael F. Cohen, American computer graphics researcher
- Martin A. Couney, American obstetrician that pioneered incubator technology for premature infants

== Others ==
- Michael Cohen (cricketer) (born 1998), South African cricketer
- Michael Cohen (politician), former member of the New York State Assembly
- Mike Cohen (screenwriter), American screenwriter

== See also ==
- List of people with surname Cohen
- Mickey Cohen (1913–1976), American gangster
- Michel Cohen, art dealer
