= Alfred Andrew Cohen =

American railroad financier, lawyer and entrepreneur (1829–1887)

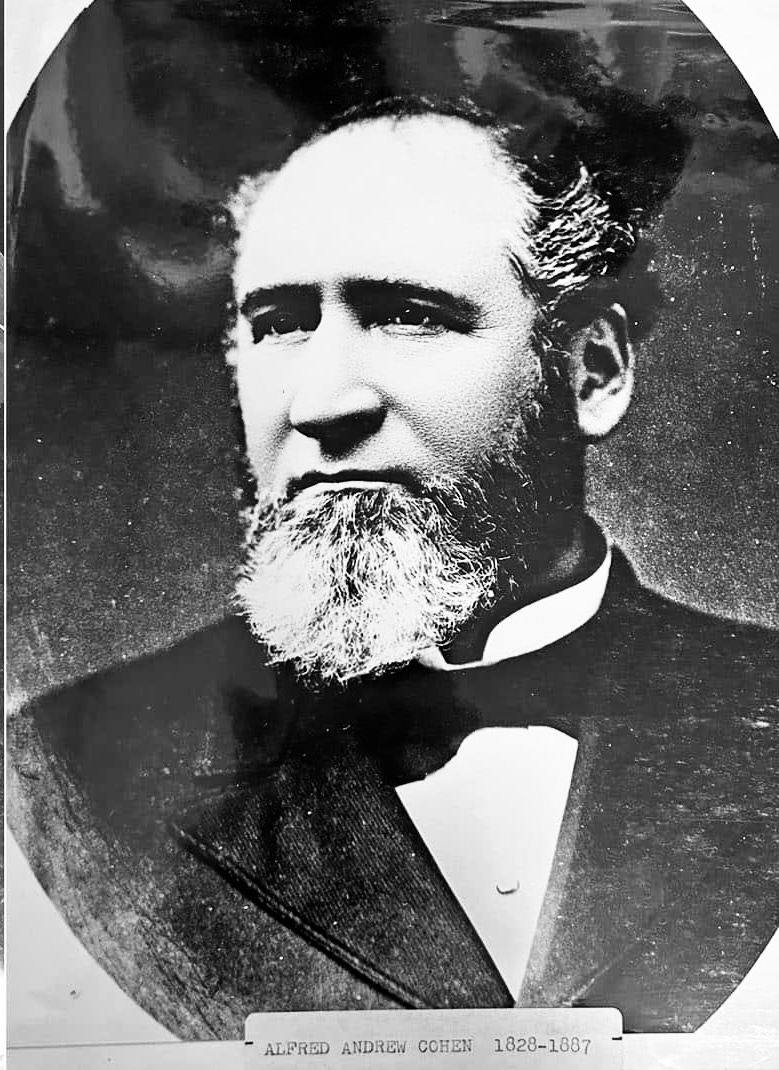
Cohen, c. 1887

Alfred Andrew Cohen (July 17, 1829 – November 16, 1887) was an American railroad financier, lawyer, and entrepreneur. He founded the San Francisco and Oakland Railroad.

== Life and work ==
Cohen's family had roots in Amsterdam, an ancestor Yehuda Cohen was born in Fuerth (1688), and had moved to Amsterdam in 1740. Their son Moses Cohen moved to England and later to Jamaica where they had several generations were born and some moved back to London and set up the business of "Hyman & Judah Cohen, Merchants". The 1833 emancipation act that freed the slaves and a failed Bank of Scotland led to losses in their Jamaica business. Alfred's father Andrew moved to London and married Hannah Oppenheim where Alfred Andrew Cohen was their seventh of twelve children. In 1847, Alfred went to Kingston, Jamaica, to work with his brother Morris A. Cohen but when he heard about the gold rush in California, he moved to Sacramento in 1850. In 1852, he established a brokerage in San Francisco dealing with grain and farm goods. In 1854, he married Emilie, the daughter of Henry Gibbons, a physician from a well-known Quaker family. In 1855, Cohen who was chosen as one of three receivers by the bank Adams & Co. that was on the verge of bankruptcy. Rumours of illegal practices by Cohen were spread by a James King of William and Cohen challenged King to a duel. Cohen was however implicated in court and he was arrested and in jail he studied law. After six month in jail he was acquitted. He then passed the legal exams and began practice at the Supreme Court of California in 1857.

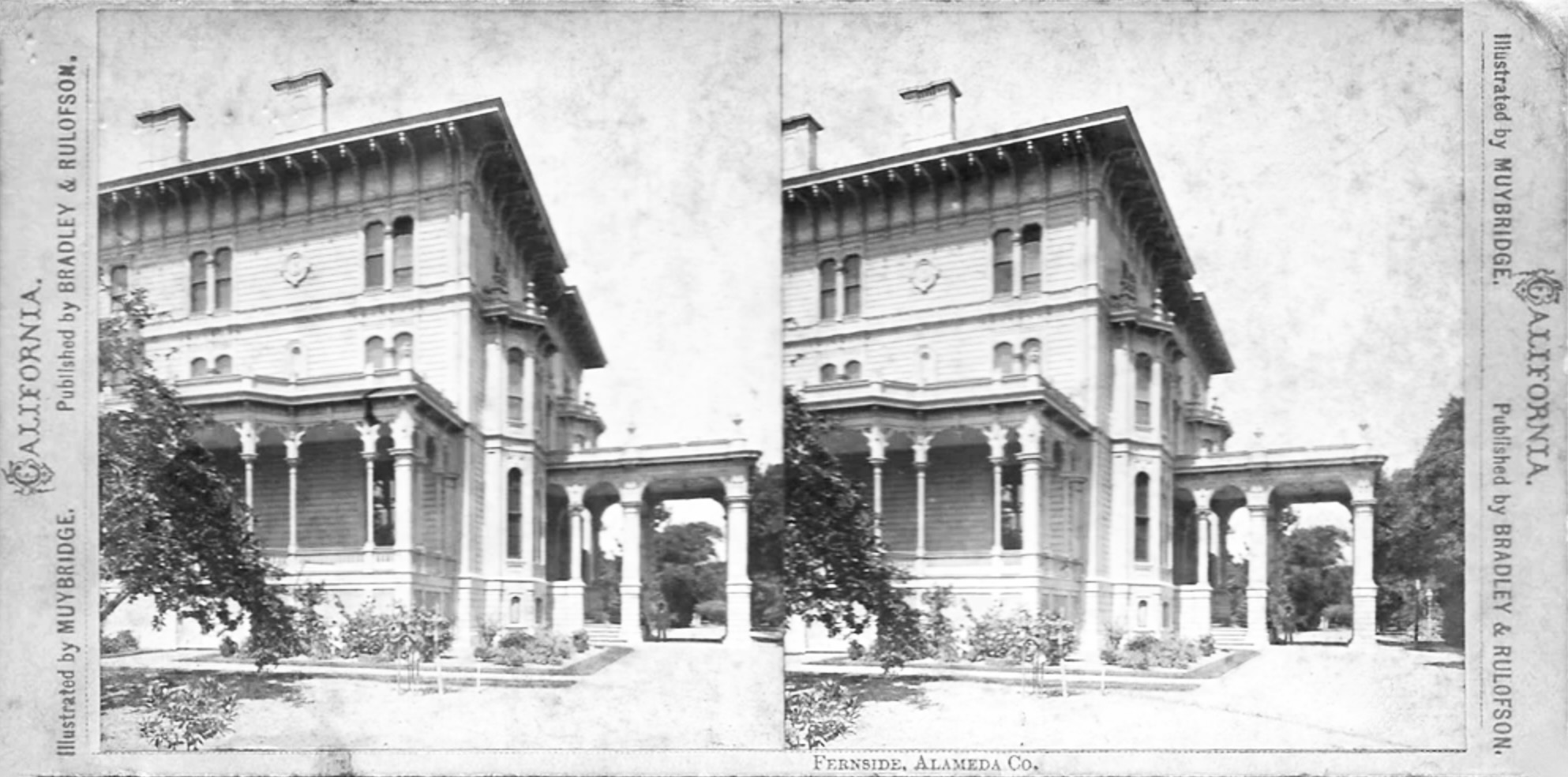
Fernside manor which burned down in 1897

He established a manor called Fernside in 1856 in Alameda on land that he came to acquire through his financial businesses. He called himself a 'gentleman farmer' and received various awards for agriculture. His law practice was much reduced from 1862 with other business interests growing such as in the construction of railroads and wharves. In 1863, he established a corporation to build and operate a railroad and ferry from San Francisco to Niles. He resigned in 1876 from legal practice in protest against railroad policies.

Jules Verne met him on the Great Eastern in 1867 and included him and his wife as characters in his novel A Floating City (1871). Cohen's son Donald Atherton became an ornithologist and farmer while son Edgar took to photography.
