= Larry Cohen (disambiguation) =

Larry Cohen (died 2019) was an American film producer, director, and screenwriter.

Larry Cohen or Lawrence Cohen may also refer to:

- Larry Cohen (bridge) (born 1959, Larry Neil), American bridge player and writer, known for the idea of "The Law of Total Tricks"
- Larry T. Cohen (1943–2016), American bridge player, accused in 1977 of cheating during a trial match for international selection
- Larry Cohen (union leader), president of the Communication Workers of America
- Larry Cohen (soccer) (born 1987), South African professional footballer
- Larry Cohen (musician), American newgrass bass player in Skyline and composer
- L. Jonathan Cohen (1923–2006), British philosopher
- Lawrence D. Cohen, American screenwriter, best known for writing Brian De Palma's Carrie (1976)
- Lawrence D. Cohen (politician) (1933–2016), American politician
- Lawrence J. Cohen, psychologist and author
