= Morris Cohen =

Morris Cohen may refer to:

- Morris Cohen (Canadian chemist) (1915–?), Canadian chemist and corrosion researcher; winner of the 1983 Olin Palladium Award
- Morris Cohen (American metallurgist) (1911–2005), American metallurgist who was affiliated with the Massachusetts Institute of Technology
- Morris Cohen (spy) (1910–1995), American convicted of espionage for the Soviet Union
- Morris L. Cohen (1927–2010), American attorney, law librarian and professor of law
- Morris Raphael Cohen (1880–1947), American philosopher, lawyer and legal scholar
- Morris U. Cohen (1910?–1989?), American teacher accused of Soviet espionage
- Two-Gun Cohen (Morris Abraham Cohen, 1887–1970), British-Canadian adventurer, major-general in the Chinese National Revolutionary Army

== See also ==
- Maurice Abraham Cohen (1851–1923), linguist and pioneer of Jewish education
- Maurice Alfred Cohen (1905–1968), birth name of British and Irish popular music composer and lyricist Michael Carr
- Maurice Cohen (1927–2006), manager of a post office branch in Israel, who attended to incoming telegrams of the Mossad
