= Abraham Kohn =

Czech rabbi

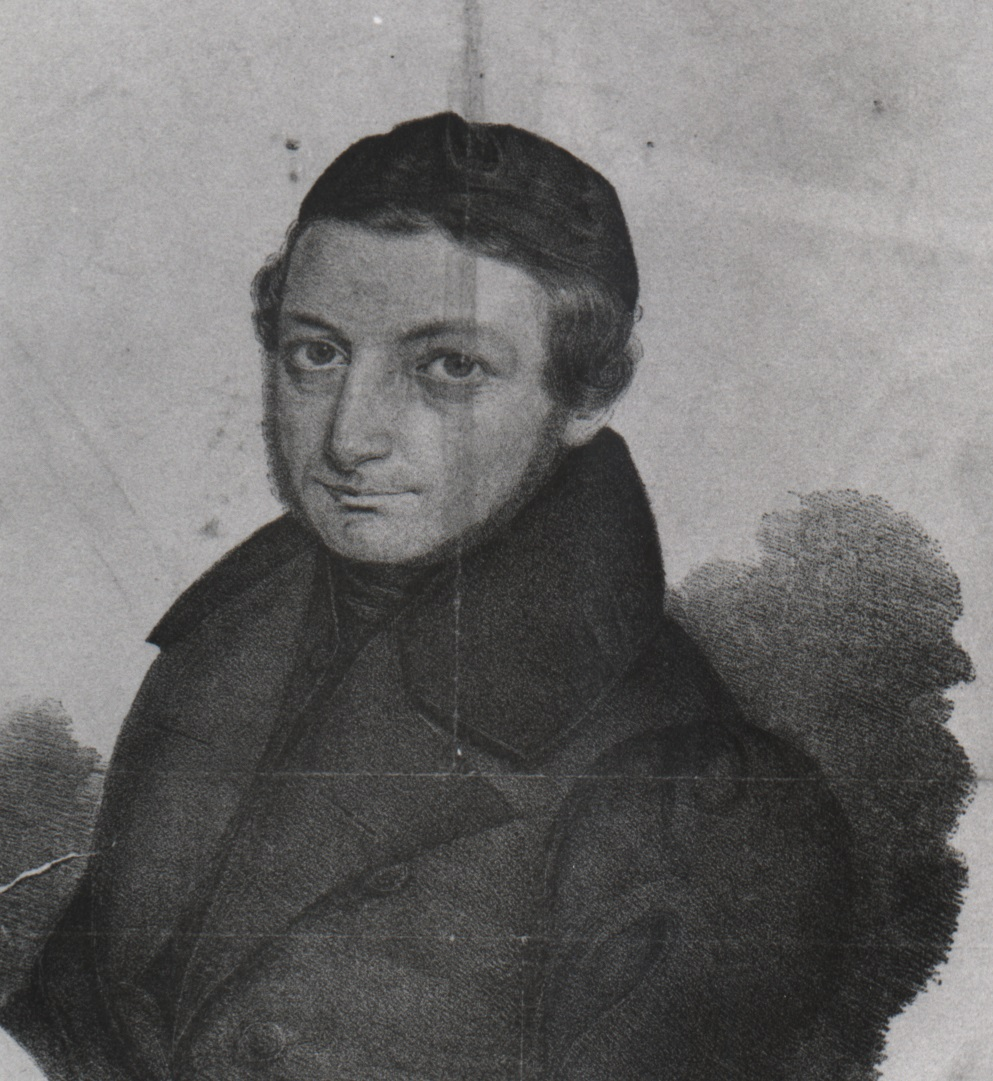
Painting of Rabbi A. Kohn, 1834

Abraham Kohn (June 13, 1806 in Zalužany, Bohemia – September 7, 1848 at Lemberg, Galicia) was the liberal Chief Rabbi of Lemberg, and was poisoned to death.

In 1828, he entered the University of Prague, where he applied himself to philosophy, while devoting his spare time to rabbinical studies. In July, 1833, he was appointed rabbi of Hohenems, Vorarlberg, where he remained for eleven years. Besides organizing various charitable societies, he greatly improved the educational facilities for the young, and introduced many reforms into the public service. In May, 1844, he accepted the rabbinate of Lemberg. Here in a comparatively short time he opened a well-equipped "Normalschule" of which he was the superintendent, dedicated a new reform temple, abolished many old abuses, and did not rest until the degrading tax on kosher meat and Sabbath candles, imposed upon the Jewish community by the government, was removed.

In 1902 the Lviv/Lemberg Jewish community commissioned a portrait of Abraham Kohn. The posthumous portrait was painted by a Lviv-based Jewish painter Wilhelm Wachtel (1875-1952). Presently this portrait is in the collection of the Voznytsky Lviv National Gallery in Lviv, Ukraine.

== Death ==
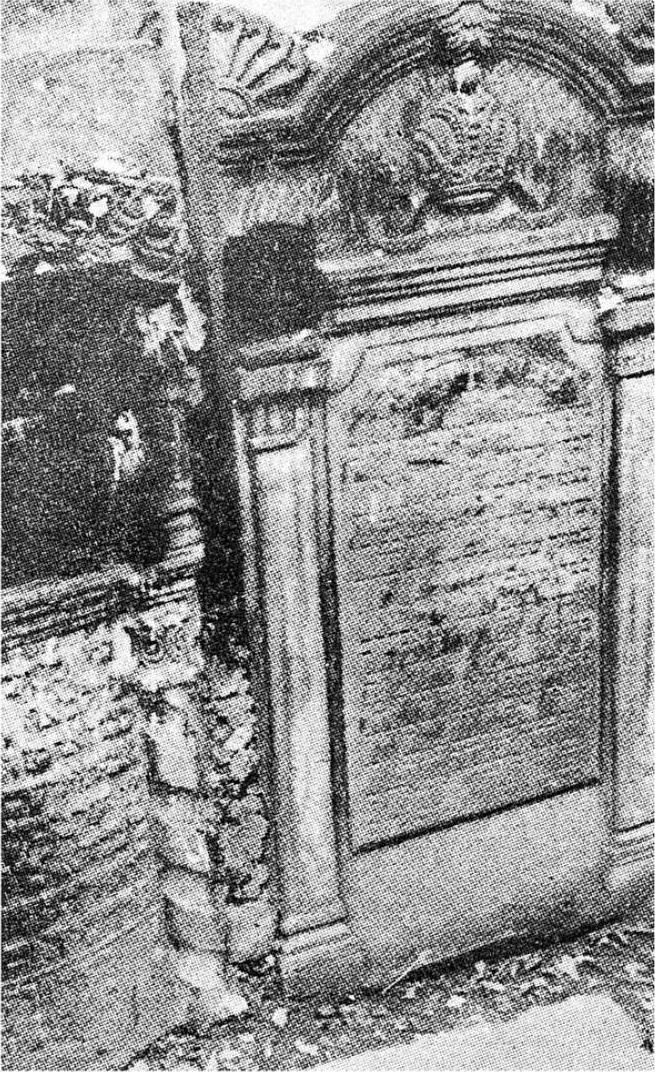
Grave of Kohn at the Old Jewish cemetery in Lviv

While the less traditional element rallied about him, the traditionalists of the community bitterly protested changes to their religion. On September 6, 1848, Abraham Ber Pilpel, said to be hired by a fanatical clique, entered Kohn's kitchen and poisoned the family's dinner with arsenic. While the other members of his family recovered, Kohn and his youngest daughter (cf. "Reformed Judaism and its Pioneers" by E. Schreiber, where he writes that the only victim of the murder was Rabbi Kohn himself and the rest of the family recovered), died the following day. After Kohn died Pilpel stood trial for his murder and was convicted. However, on appeal this was overturned. After the verdict was overturned, it was again reviewed by the highest court and the appellate court's judgment was upheld.

== Sources and references ==
- Michael Stanislawski, A Murder in Lemberg: Politics, Religion, and Violence in Modern Jewish History (Princeton University Press, 2007)
- the Seforim blog, Tuesday, April 17, 2007 Review of Stanislawski's book
- Jonatan Meir, 'Review of Michael Stanislawski, A Murder in Lemberg: Politics, Religion, and Violence in Modern Jewish History, Jerusalem 2010', GAL-ED 24 (2015), pp. 173–176
