= Jeff Cohen =

Jeff or Jeffrey Cohen may refer to:

- Jeff Cohen (basketball) (1939–1978), American professional basketball player
- Jeff Cohen (actor) (born 1974), American attorney and former child actor (The Goonies)
- Jeff Cohen (media critic), founder of Fairness & Accuracy in Reporting, a media watchdog group in the United States
- Jeff Cohen (playwright and theater director), American theater director, playwright and producer
- Jeff Cohen (sports executive), American sports executive
- Jeff Cohen (songwriter) (born 1966), American songwriter, producer and publisher
- Jeff Cohen (pianist), American pianist, accompanist of baritone Tassis Christoyannis
- Geoffrey Cohen, a pseudonym used by representatives of the activist group Jewdas
- Jeffrey A. Cohen (born 1954), American neurologist
- Jeffrey E. Cohen (active from 1971), American R&B, soul and funk songwriter and record producer
- Jeffrey H. Cohen (born 1962), American anthropologist
- J. J. Cohen (born 1965), American actor
