= Albert Cohn =

Albert Cohn may refer to:

- Albert Cohn (scholar) (1814–1877), French Jewish philanthropist and scholar
- Albert C. Cohn (1885–1959), father of Roy Cohn

== See also ==
- Albert Cohen (disambiguation)
