= Philip Cohen =

Philip, Phillip, or Phil Cohen may refer to:

- Phil Cohen (cultural theorist) (1943–2024), British cultural theorist, ethnographer, writer and activist
- Sir Philip Cohen (British biochemist) (born 1945), British researcher and academic
- Philip F. Cohen (born 1950), Canadian nuclear medicine physician and biomedical scientist
- Philip P. Cohen (1908–1993), American biochemist
- Philip N. Cohen (born 1967), American sociologist
- Philip M. Cohen, inventor of several chess variants
- Philip J. Cohen (born 1953), American former United Nations advisor and writer
- Phillip Ean Cohen, Australian investor
- Philip "Little Farvel" Cohen (1906/07–1949), Murder, Inc. criminal
- The fictional Hardy Boys character Phil Cohen
