= Aaron Cohen =

Aaron Cohen may refer to:

- Aaron Cohen (actor) (born 1976) American-Canadian actor and pundit
- Aaron Cohen (Deputy NASA administrator) (1931–2010), deputy administrator of NASA
- Aaron Cohen (judoka) (born 1981), American judoka
- Aaron Cohen (rapper), American rapper

== See also ==
- Aaron ben David Cohen of Ragusa (c. 1580–?), rabbi in the Republic of Ragusa
- Aaron Cohen's Debt, a 1999 Israeli film
