= Jean Cohen =

French virologist (1941–2004)

- Born: 1941; Tunisia
- Died: 2004 (aged 62–63); Paris
- Known for: Rotavirus
- Scientific career
- Fields: Virologist
- Workplaces: INRA

Jean Cohen (1941 – 2004 in Paris) was a French scientist, known for his studies on rotaviruses.

== Publications ==
- Cohen, J; Laporte, J; Charpilienne, A; Scherrer, R (1979). "Activation of rotavirus RNA polymerase by calcium chelation". Archives of Virology. 60 (3–4): 177–86. doi:10.1007/BF01317489. PMID 41504. S2CID 34598600.
- Cohen, J; Dobos, P (1979). "Cell free transcription and translation of rotavirus RNA". Biochemical and Biophysical Research Communications. 88 (3): 791–6. doi:10.1016/0006-291X(79)91477-3. PMID 88940.
- Roseto, A; Escaig, J; Delain, E; Cohen, J; Scherrer, R (1979). "Structure of rotaviruses as studied by the freeze-drying technique". Virology. 98 (2): 471–5. doi:10.1016/0042-6822(79)90571-3. PMID 228484.
- Corthier, G; Cohen, J; Scherrer, R (1980). "Isolation of pig rotavirus in France. Identification and experimental infections". Annales de Recherches Vétérinaires. 11 (1): 45–8. PMID 6254431.
- La Bonnardière, C; Cohen, J; Contrepois, M (1981). "Interferon activity in rotavirus infected newborn calves". Annales de Recherches Vétérinaires. 12 (1): 85–91. PMID 6177275.
- Roseto, A; Guillemin, MC; Cohen, J; Scherrer, R; Périés, J (1982). "Production of monoclonal antibodies against bovine rotavirus". Comptes Rendus de l'Académie des Sciences, Série III. 294 (4): 211–4. PMID 6282403.
