= Eugene D. Cohen =

American lawyer

Eugene Donald Cohen (born August 5, 1946 in Abington, Pennsylvania) is a lawyer, writer, and philanthropist.

He married and then divorced Janet Susan Seder. He is now married to Anne Thompson.

Cohen received his B.A. degree from the University of Pennsylvania in 1968, M.S. in sociology from the University of Wisconsin–Madison in 1972, and J.D. from the University of New Mexico School of Law in 1976. He served in the Peace Corps in el Salvador from 1968-1970.

His early research into the ability of threats to act as a deterrent was the first experimental validation of Coleman's theory of social exchange, a part of rational choice theory.

Cohen joined the law firm of Brown and Bain (now Perkins, Coie, Brown, and Bain) in Phoenix, Arizona in 1976, then moved to the United States Department of Justice, Antitrust Division in 1992.

His prominent cases included Apple v. Franklin, which established that operating systems are subject to copyright laws, and the 1994 U.S. v Microsoft EOM licensing case, in which he deposed Bill Gates. (Not to be confused with the 1998 deposition of Bill Gates released as a video.)

In 2006-2007, Cohen wrote for the Arizona Republic Plugged-In about politics affecting Central Phoenix residents.

He currently lives in Phoenix, Arizona and serves as the Executive Director of the Jessica Jennifer Cohen Foundation. Cohen founded the Jessica Jennifer Cohen Foundation in 2000. Since then, the foundation has funded thirty community service projects by young people, including recording the stories of women moving out of poverty in Boston, documenting orphans in Ethiopia, giving voice to disadvantaged youth in Kenya, supporting sustainable shade grown coffee

Cohen also teaches legal writing seminars for law firms, law schools, and government agencies.

== Works ==
- "Effects of punishment magnitude in the bilateral threat situation: Evidence for the deterrence hypothesis." Journal of Personality and Social Psychology, Vol 26(3), Jun, 1973. pp. 427–438. (with H. Andrew Michener and Aage B. Sorenson)
- "Social exchange: Predicting interpersonal outcomes in four-event, three-person systems." Journal of Personality and Social Psychology, Vol 32(2), Aug, 1975. pp. 283–293 (with H. Andrew Michener)
- "Social exchange: Predicting transactional outcomes in five-event, four-person systems." American Sociological Review, Vol 42(3), Jun, 1977. pp. 522–535. (with H. Andrew Michener and Aage B. Sorenson)
- Cohen has published over six letters to the editor of The New York Times, over nine letters to the editor of the Financial Times, over nineteen letters to the editor of the Arizona Republic, as well as letters in the Arizona Star and The Wall Street Journal.
