= Myra Cohen =

Myra Cohen may refer to:

- Myra Cohen (dental assistant) (1892–1959), early New Zealander
- Myra B. Cohen, American software engineer educated in New Zealand
- Myra Cohen, writer for 1970s US children's television show That's Cat
- Myra Cohen, second wife of British businessman Eric Miller (businessman) (1926–1977)
- Myra Cohen, wife of Argentinian-American interfaith advocate León Klenicki (1930–2009)
- Myra Cohen, councilwoman in Newington, Connecticut, namesake of access road for Cedar Street station
- Myra Cohen, fictional character played by Debra Mooney in television series Chance
