= Andrew Cohen =

Andrew or Andy Cohen may refer to:

== Media ==
- Andy Cohen (born 1968), American television executive and pop culture blogger
- Andrew J. Cohen, American screenwriter and film director
- Andrew Cohen (filmmaker) (born 1965), American independent filmmaker and journalist

== Politics ==
- Andrew Cohen (colonial administrator) (1909–1968), former governor of Uganda
- Andrew Cohen (politician) (born 1969), American politician in New York City

== Sports ==
- Andy Cohen (baseball) (1904–1988), Major League second baseman
- Andrew Cohen (footballer) (born 1981), Maltese former footballer

== Other ==
- Andrew Cohen (journalist) (born 1955), Canadian
- Andrew Cohen (spiritual teacher) (1955–2025), American
- Andrew Cohen (poker player) (born c. 1969), American
- Andrew Cohen (businessman) (born 1977), Australian entrepreneur
- Andy Cohen (architect), American Co-CEO of Gensler
- Andy Cohen, guitarist for the band Silkworm

== See also ==
- Andrew (disambiguation)
- Andy (disambiguation)
- Cohen (disambiguation)
