= Zalužany =

- Municipality
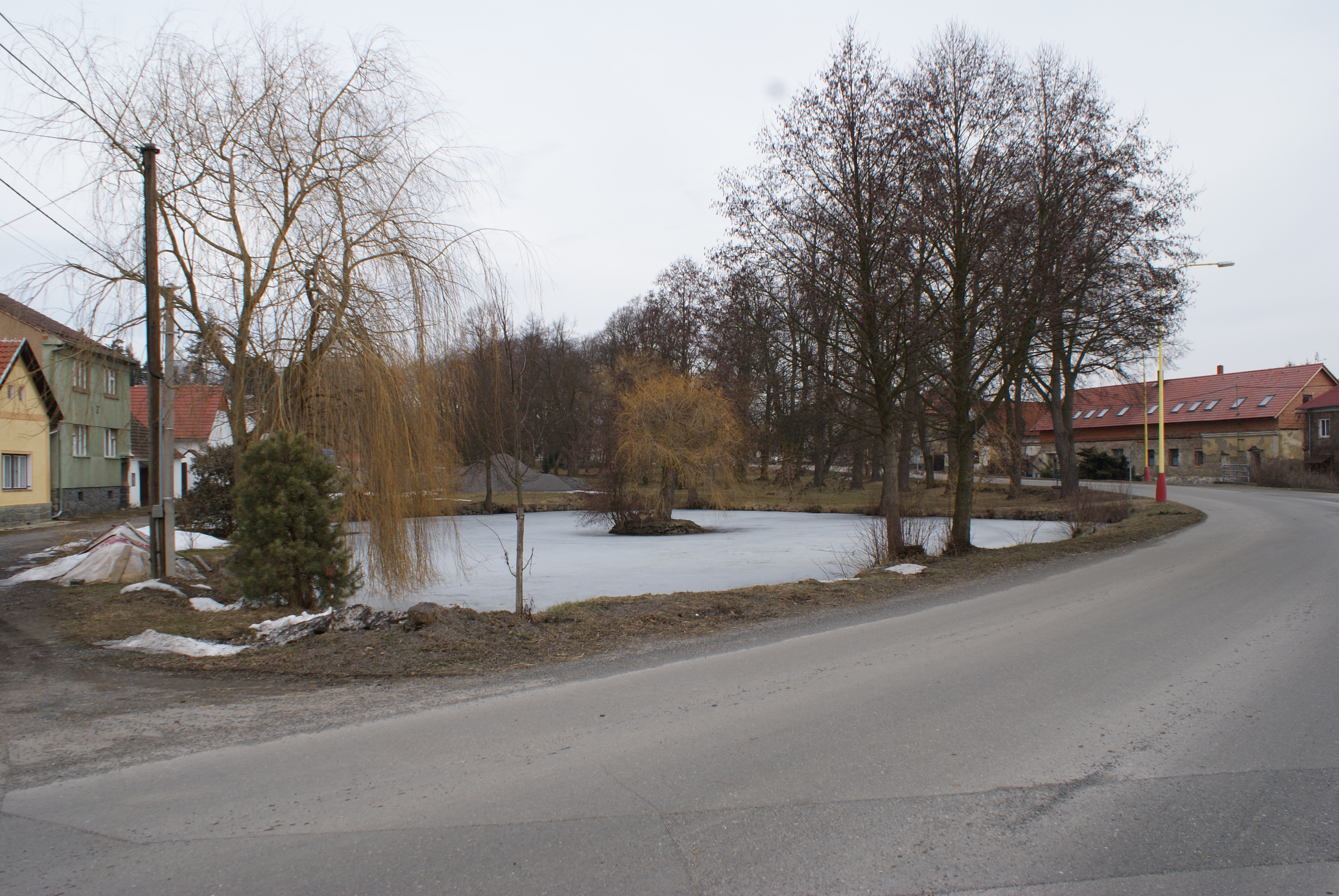
- Centre of Zalužany

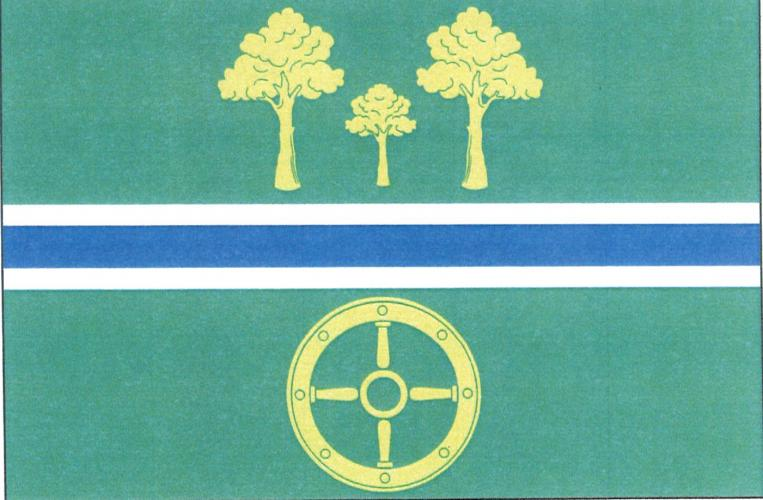
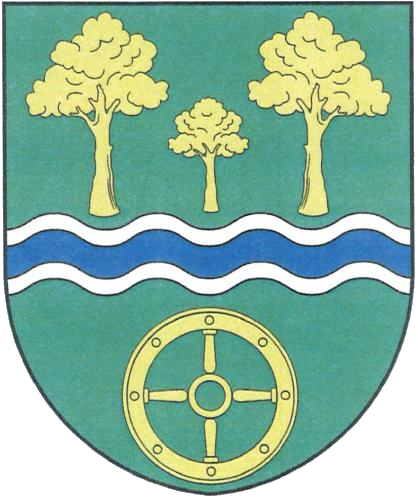
- Flag Coat of arms

- Location in the Czech Republic
- Coordinates: 49°32′32″N 14°5′9″E
- Country: Czech Republic
- Region: Central Bohemian
- District: Příbram
- First mentioned: 1291

Area
  - Total: 9.56 km^{2} (3.69 sq mi)
- Elevation: 466 m (1,529 ft)

Population (2026-01-01)
  - Total: 325
  - Density: 34.0/km^{2} (88.0/sq mi)
- Time zone: UTC+1 (CET)
  - Summer (DST): UTC+2 (CEST)
- Postal code: 262 84
- Website: www.obeczaluzany.cz

Zalužany (German: Saluschan) is a municipality and village in Příbram District in the Central Bohemian Region of the Czech Republic. It has about 300 inhabitants.

== Etymology ==
The name is derived from za luhem or za luží, i.e. 'behind a riparian forest'. It referred to its location.

== Geography ==
Zalužany is located about 16 kilometres (10 mi) southeast of Příbram and 57 km (35 mi) southwest of Prague. It lies in the Benešov Uplands. The highest point is at 533 m (1,749 ft) above sea level. There are several small fishponds in the municipal territory.

== History ==
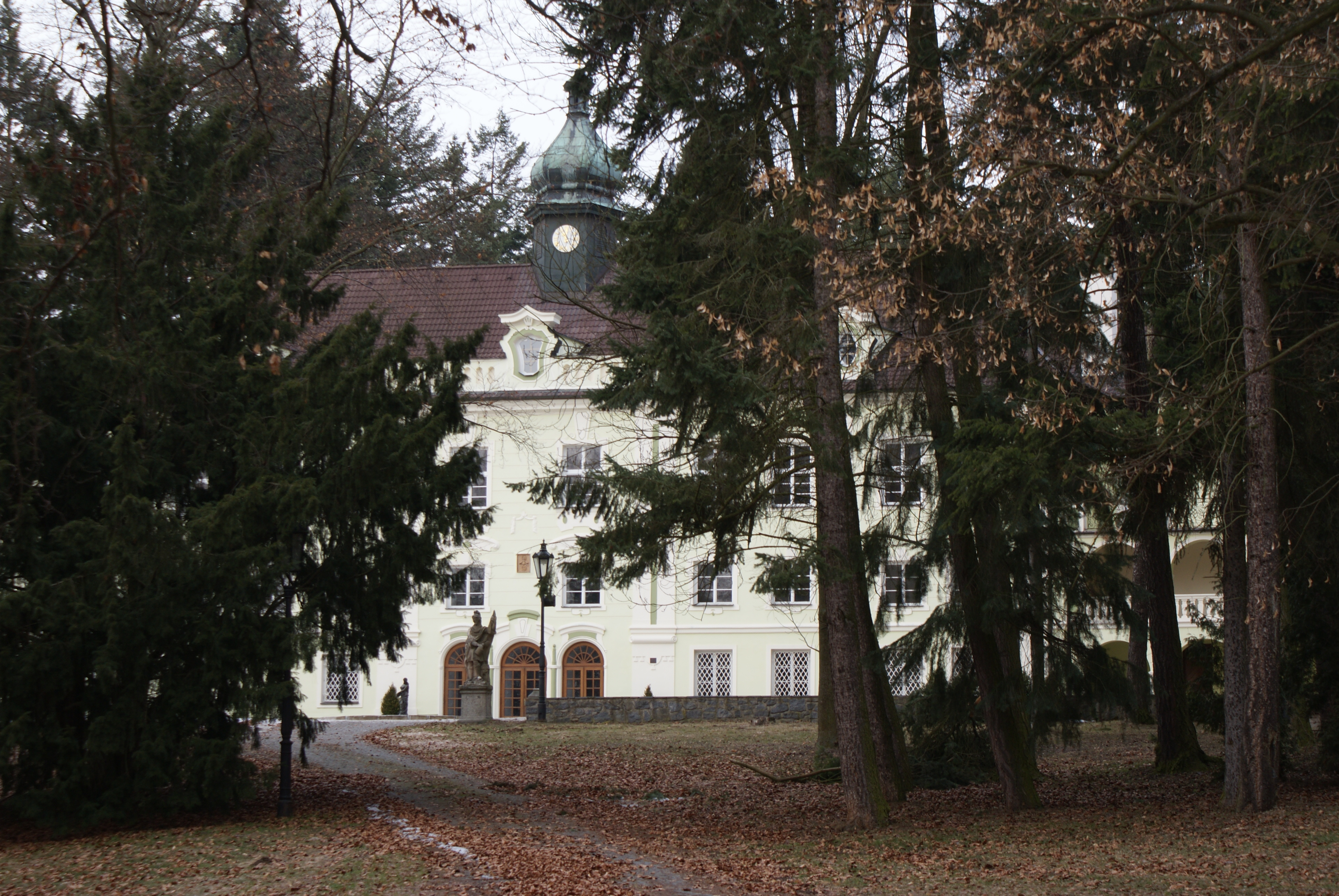
Zalužany Castle

A Slavic settlement was founded in the area of today's Zalužany between the 8th and 10th centuries. In the 13th century, the village belonged under the administration of the royal castle of Kamýk nad Vltavou. The first written mention of Zalužany is from 1291 when King Wenceslaus II donated it to the Ostrov monastery in Davle.

In the 14th century, the village had been divided in two parts. The smaller one belonged under the administration of the royal Orlík Castle and the larger one was consecutively owned by a line of noble families. This state continued in the following centuries.

== Demographics ==
Historical population

| Year | Pop. | ±% |
|---|---|---|
| 1869 | 837 | — |
| 1880 | 872 | +4.2% |
| 1890 | 822 | −5.7% |
| 1900 | 801 | −2.6% |
| 1910 | 804 | +0.4% |

| Year | Pop. | ±% |
|---|---|---|
| 1921 | 758 | −5.7% |
| 1930 | 722 | −4.7% |
| 1950 | 509 | −29.5% |
| 1961 | 529 | +3.9% |
| 1970 | 473 | −10.6% |

| Year | Pop. | ±% |
|---|---|---|
| 1980 | 407 | −14.0% |
| 1991 | 387 | −4.9% |
| 2001 | 335 | −13.4% |
| 2011 | 331 | −1.2% |
| 2021 | 301 | −9.1% |

Source: Censuses

== Transport ==
The D4 motorway from Prague to Písek runs through the municipality.

== Sights ==
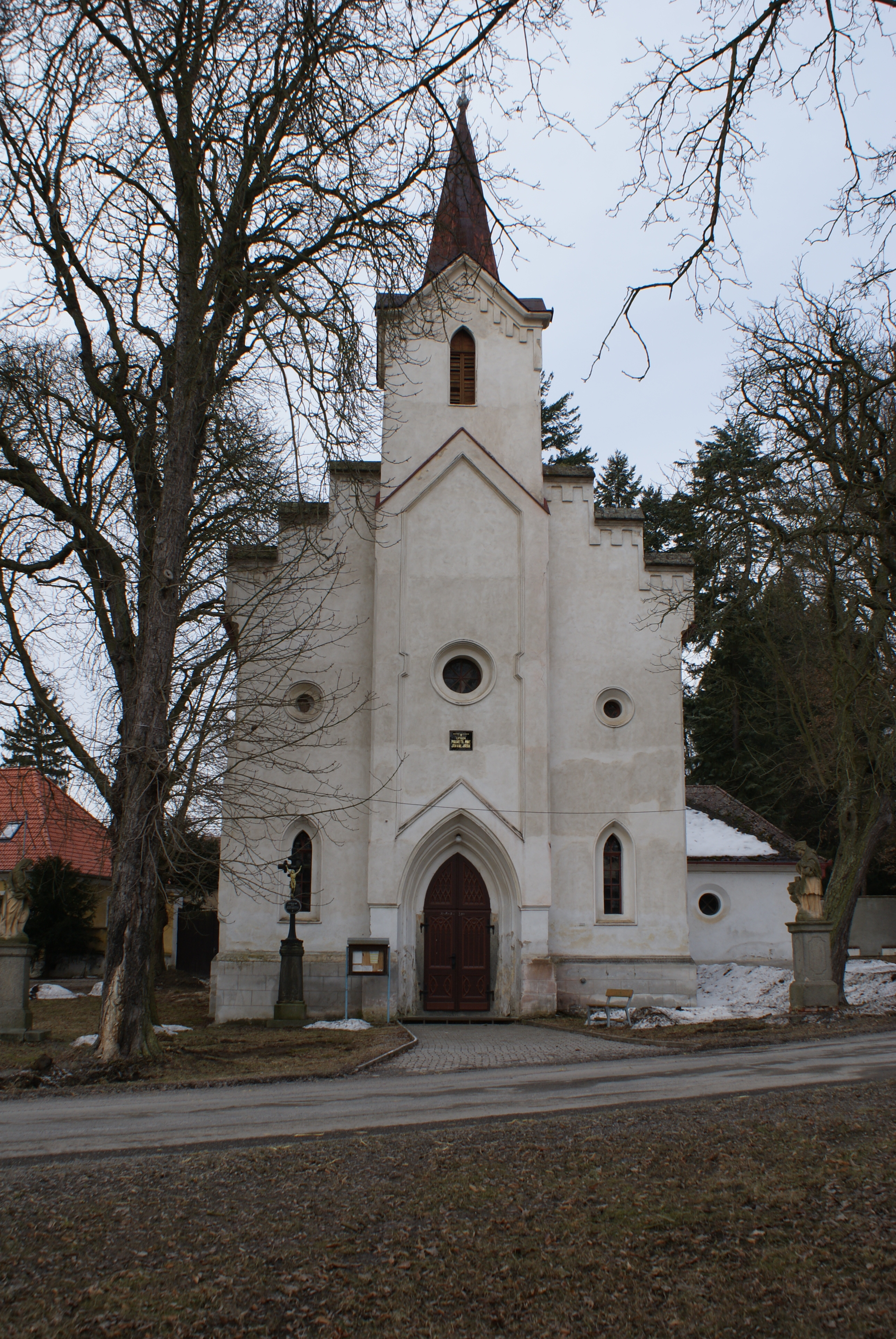
Church of Saint Charles Borromeo

The most valuable part of Zalužany is the historical centre with the Zalužany Castle. A fortress from the 15th century was rebuilt into the Renaissance castle the mid-17th century. Today, the castle houses several exhibitions.

A Jewish cemetery, protected as a cultural monument, is located next to the castle.

The pseudo-Gothic Church of Saint Charles Borromeo was built in 1872–1874.
