= Joel Cohen =

Joel Cohen is the name of:

- Joel Cohen (musician) (1942–2026), American musician specializing in early music repertoires
- Joel Cohen (writer) (born 1963), American screenwriter
- Joel H. Cohen, Canadian television writer for The Simpsons
- Joel Ephraim Cohen (born 1944), American mathematical biologist

== See also ==
- Joel Coen (born 1954), of the Coen brothers
- Joel-Cohen incision, a popular technique for performing caesarean section
