= Kerry Cohen =

American author

- Born: September 15, 1970 (age 56); Cleveland, Ohio, U.S.
- Education: University of Oregon (MFA); Pacific University (MA); California Southern University (PsyD)
- Occupation: Author
- Writing career
- Pen name: Kerry Cohen Hoffmann
- Website: www.kerry-cohen.com

Kerry Cohen (born September 15, 1970, in Cleveland, Ohio) is an American author. She also writes as Kerry Cohen Hoffmann.

Cohen grew up in suburban New Jersey. She received an MFA in creative writing from the University of Oregon, a MA in counseling psychology from Pacific University, and a Doctor of Psychology (PsyD) from California Southern University. A counselor (LPC Intern) and writing instructor, she lives with her children and boyfriend in Portland, Oregon. She is the author of Loose Girl: A Memoir of Promiscuity, based on her own promiscuity during her teens. In 2006, she published Easy, a young adult novel.”Lush” 2018

She teaches creative writing for Gotham Writers Workshop in New York City, the Red Earth low-residency MFA at Oklahoma City University, and the low-residency MFA at Goddard College.

== Bibliography ==
- The Truth of Memoir: How To Write About Yourself and Others with Honesty, Emotion, and Integrity (Writer's Digest Books, 2014)
- Easy (Simon & Schuster, 2006)
  - 2006 ALA Quick Pick for Young Adults and 2006 Oregon Book Award finalist
- Loose Girl: A Memoir of Promiscuity (Hyperion, 2008)
- The Good Girl (Delacorte, 2008)
- It's Not You, It's Me (Delacorte, 2009)
  - 2010 Oregon Book Award finalist
- Seeing Ezra (Seal Press, 2011)
- Dirty Little Secrets (Sourcebooks, 2011)
- Spent (Seal Press, 2014)
- . “Lush” (Sourcebooks, 2018)
- Crazy For You: Breaking the Spell of Sex and Love Addiction (Balance, 2021)
