= Gabriel Cohen =

Israeli footballer

Gabriel Cohen גבריאל כהן
Personal information
- Full name: Gabriel Cohen
- Date of birth: April 10, 1991 (age 35)
- Place of birth: Haifa, Israel
- Position: Goalkeeper

Team information
- Current team: Ironi Tiberias

Youth career
- Hapoel Haifa

Senior career*
Years	Team	Apps	(Gls)
2010–2011	Maccabi Ironi Kiryat Ata	1	(0)
2011–2012	Hapoel Hedera	4	(0)
2012–2013	Maccabi Netanya	0	(0)
2013–2014	Maccabi Tzur Shalom	14	(0)
2014–2015	Maccabi Sektzia Ma'alot-Tarshiha	12	(0)
2015–2016	Beitar Nahariya	6	(0)
2016–2017	Ironi Tiberias	6	(0)
2017–2018	Hapoel Beit She'an	14	(0)
2018	Hapoel Shefa'-Amr	3	(0)
2018–2019	Hapoel Kfar Shalem	1	(0)
2019–2020	Hapoel Iksal	0	(0)
2021–2022	Ironi Tiberias	0	(0)
2022–2023	Robi Shapira Haifa	17	(0)
2023–	F.C. Haifa	1	(0)
- * Club domestic league appearances and goals as of 1 July 2023

Gabriel Cohen (Hebrew: גבריאל כהן; born April 10, 1991) is an Israeli footballer.
