= Joshua Cohen =

Joshua Cohen may refer to:

- Joshua Lionel Cowen (1877–1965), born Cohen, American inventor
- Yehoshua Cohen (1922–1986), Israeli assassin
- Joshua Cohen (philosopher) (born 1951), American philosopher
- Joshua J. Cohen (born 1973), mayor of Annapolis, Maryland
- Joshua Cohen (writer) (born 1980), American writer
- Josh Cohen (basketball) (born 2001), American basketball player
- Josh Cohen (tennis) (born 1984), American tennis player, head coach of Philadelphia Freedoms
- Josh Cohen (soccer) (born 1992), American soccer player
