= Peter Cohen =

Peter Cohen or Peter Cohn may refer to:

- Peter A. Cohen, former chairman and CEO of Shearson Lehman Brothers and current chairman and CEO of Cowen Group
- Peter-Adrian Cohen, American writer
- Peter Cohen (director) (born 1946), Swedish film director, writer, editor and producer
- Peter Cohn (director), American film director, writer, and producer
