= Graeme Cohen =

Australian historian of mathematics

- Education: University of Sydney (BSc, MSc); University of New South Wales (PhD); University of Technology Sydney (MA)
- Known for: Counting Australia In; Lower bounds for odd perfect numbers Infinitary divisors
- Awards: Honorary member (2006) and fellow, Australian Mathematical Society; Fellow, Royal Society of New South Wales (2020)
- Scientific career
- Fields: Number theory History of mathematics
- Workplaces: University of Technology Sydney
- Thesis: Generalised quasiperfect numbers (1982)

Graeme Laurence Cohen is an Australian mathematician and historian of mathematics. He was an associate professor at the University of Technology Sydney, and much of his research concerned odd perfect numbers.

Cohen's undergraduate textbook A Course in Modern Analysis and its Applications was published in 2003. Three years later he published Counting Australia In, a history of the people and institutions of Australian mathematics, and in 2007 Figuring Sport, written with Neville de Mestre. His novel The Possibly True Story of Martin Gardiner followed in 2022. He is an honorary member and fellow of the Australian Mathematical Society, and was elected a fellow of the Royal Society of New South Wales in 2020.

== Education and career ==
Cohen took a Bachelor of Science with honours and a Master of Science at the University of Sydney, and later a Master of Arts at the University of Technology Sydney. He completed a doctorate at the University of New South Wales in 1982, with a thesis titled Generalised quasiperfect numbers.

He taught at the University of Technology Sydney for thirty-six years, retiring in 2002 as an associate professor in the School of Mathematical Sciences. Cohen was one of the founders of Shalom College at the University of New South Wales in 1968, and became part-time Hillel director in Sydney in 1971. He was a member of the Klein Design Team, formed for the Klein Project, an initiative of the International Mathematical Union and the International Commission on Mathematical Instruction. He edited the Australian Mathematical Society's Gazette in the 1980s. He was joint editor of the Society's Bulletin for one issue in 2011 and then its sole editor until 2014, and later edited the Society's history of mathematics resource.

== Research ==
Most of Cohen's research concerned odd perfect numbers. In 1978 he showed that the sum of the reciprocals of the prime divisors of such a number is less than log 2. His 1982 doctoral thesis gave a substantial lower bound on the number of prime factors an odd perfect number must have, counted with multiplicity. With Richard Brent and Herman te Riele he showed in 1991 that any odd perfect number would have to run to at least 300 digits, and with Peter Hagis he proved in 1998 that every one has a prime factor greater than a million.

Cohen also defined the infinitary divisors of an integer, and with te Riele the (m, k)-perfect numbers. With Ronald Sorli he introduced the harmonic seed, and with Hagis he worked on quasiperfect numbers and on a conjecture of Lehmer about the Euler totient function.

== Books ==
Cohen's undergraduate textbook was published in 2003 by Cambridge University Press, as the seventeenth title in the Australian Mathematical Society Lecture Series. It was reprinted in 2021 in association with the Harbin Institute of Technology Press for distribution in mainland China. Rod Nillsen, in the Gazette of the Australian Mathematical Society, found it a coherent work for a wide readership, well written and largely self-contained. He thought its applications rather than its treatment of standard material made it distinctive, but found the application to quantum mechanics underdeveloped.

Cohen wrote Figuring Sport with Neville de Mestre. It was published in 2007 and covers the mathematics of tennis, cricket, golf, rowing, weightlifting, football, billiards and athletics, along with the design of tournaments and the selection of teams. Jagannath Mazumdar reviewed the book for the Gazette of the Australian Mathematical Society and wrote that it is a friendly monograph that assumes little beyond elementary calculus and probability. However, he pointed out that no solutions are given for the exercises.

Cohen's book Counting Australia In: The People, Organisations and Institutions of Australian Mathematics was published in 2006. Ian Sloan reviewed it in The Mathematical Intelligencer, calling it a fine book deserving a wide readership. He found it enjoyable, and wrote that it does not avoid the discipline's internal quarrels. However, he found the detail sometimes overwhelming.

=== The Possibly True Story of Martin Gardiner ===
Cohen's novel The Possibly True Story of Martin Gardiner was published in 2022. It is a historical account of Martin Gardiner, an Irish-Australian mathematician born in Dublin around 1833 who came to Melbourne in 1856. Gardiner published more than a dozen research papers but never got the academic post he wanted.

Clifford Gilmore, in the Irish Mathematical Society Bulletin found the book an entertaining and at times shocking portrait. Reviewing the book in the Australian Journal of Biography and History, Kiera Lindsey wrote that the unlikability of its subject made the novel compelling and added that Cohen's approach "raises rich questions regarding the relationship between history and literature". She questioned whether a subject as well documented as Gardiner justified speculative methods at all. Jeffrey Cohen, in the Gazette of the Australian Mathematical Society, called it a "page-turner".

== Honours ==
- 2006 - Honorary Membership and Fellowship, Australian Mathematical Society
- 2020 - Fellowship, Royal Society of New South Wales
