= Carol Fishman Cohen =

American businesswoman, author, consultant

Carol Fishman Cohen is the CEO and co-founder of iRelaunch, an author, a speaker and a consultant to employers, universities, non-profits and individuals on the subject of career re-entry.

== Background and early career ==
Cohen earned a B.A. in Economics at Pomona College in Claremont, California and an MBA at Harvard Business School. Upon graduation from Harvard Business School, she worked for manufacturing subcontractor Flextronics. In 1987, Cohen joined the Boston Corporate Finance Group of Drexel Burnham Lambert, where she worked until the firm was forced into bankruptcy in February 1990.

In 2001, after 11 years out of the full time workforce, raising four children, Cohen relaunched her career in a financial analysis role with Sankaty Advisors, a division of Bain Capital. Subsequently, in 2003, Harvard Business School professors published a case study titled "Carol Fishman Cohen: Professional Career Reentry,” documenting her return to work after 11 years out of the full-time workforce.

== Return-to-work initiatives ==
Cohen began assisting other women with the perceived challenge of returning to work after time out of the workforce. With Vivian Steir Rabin, Cohen co-authored Back on the Career Track on the subject. A review from Booklist described the book as 'helpful' to Cohen's intended audience. To research the book, Cohen and Rabin interviewed more than 100 women who had returned to work after a career break. They also interviewed Supreme Court Justice Sandra Day O'Connor in person about returning to work after five years at home raising her sons and talked with employers, academics, work-life experts, recruiters, and family members of those making the return to work.

In 2007, Cohen and Rabin co-founded iRelaunch as a career reentry programming company. The following year, Cohen began studying the subject globally. By 2010 she saw internships as a means of returning to work, and as a result of this study wrote 'The 40-Year-Old Intern' for Harvard Business Review. Cohen became an advocate for formal career re-entry programs in the form of internships.

== Speaking and appearances ==
Cohen gained attention as a career reentry advocate when the TED platform posted her TEDxBeaconStreet talk called "How to get back to work after a career break" which has garnered more than 3.5 million views and has been translated into 30 languages.
