= Albert Cohen =

Albert Cohen may refer to:

- Albert Cohen (novelist) (1895–1981), Greek-born Swiss novelist
- Albert D. Cohen (1914–2011), Canadian businessman
- Albert J. Cohen (1903–1984), American screenwriter and film producer
- Albert K. Cohen (1918–2014), American criminologist
- Albert Cohen (producer), French film, television and musical producer, and radio personality
- Albert Cohen (actor) (1932–2025), Israeli actor and singer
- Albert Cohen (mathematician) (born 1965), French mathematician

== See also ==
- Albert Cohn (disambiguation)
- Bert Coan (1940–2022), American football player
