= Evelyn M. Cohen =

American art historian

Evelyn M. Cohen is an American art historian.

== Career ==
Cohen is an expert in the art of medieval Jewish manuscripts.

Cohen was responsible for reuniting the two halves of the oldest dated Jewish manuscript from the German lands. While working in an archive, she recognized that the partial manuscript of a Jewish holiday prayer book that she was examining was the other half of a prayer book that she had examined in another archive. The manuscript was the personal prayer book of Qalonimos ben Yehuda dated 28 Tevet, 5050 (January 12, 1290), Esslingen am Neckar.

Cohen is noted particularly for her work on the role of Jewish women in commissioning, owning and using books in the medieval period and Renaissance. She has recovered and describes several prayer books written in the feminine voice, including some that feature, among the blessings that begin the morning prayer, the blessing " "Blessed are you God, master of the universe, that You have made me a woman and not a man."

Other manuscripts that Cohen has studied feature women in the illuminations.

Cohen received the 1985 National Jewish Book Award in the Visual Arts category for her book on the Rothschild Maḥzor of 1492 co-authored with Menachem Schmelzer.

Cohen is the daughter of Haskell Cohen, the former Publicity Director of the NBA.

== Books ==
- A Journey through Jewish Worlds: Highlights from the Braginsky Collection of Hebrew Manuscripts and Printed Books, by Evelyn M. Cohen, Emile Schrijver, and Sharon Mintz, Waanders, 2010
- Pen and Parchment: Drawing in the Middle Ages, Metropolitan Museum of Art Publications, co-author, 2007
- The Rothschild Mahzor, - Florence, 1492, 1983
- Chosen: Philadelphia's great Hebraica, Rosenbach Museum and Library, co-author with David Stern, 2007
- Omnia in Eo: Studies on Jewish Books and Libraries in Honour of Adri Offenberg Celebrating the 125th Anniversary of the Bibliotheca Rosenthaliana in Amsterdam, Peeters Publishers, co-author, 2006.
- "Hebrew Manuscript Illumination in Italy," in Gardens and ghettos: the art of Jewish life in Italy, University of California Press, co-author, 1989.
