= Martin Cohen (soccer) =

South African soccer player

Personal information
- Full name: Martin Cohen
- Date of birth: 3 February 1952 (age 74)
- Place of birth: Johannesburg, South Africa
- Position: Midfielder

Senior career*
Years	Team	Apps	(Gls)
1970–1977	Highlands Park		
1977	Los Angeles Aztecs	21	(0)
1978–1979	Highlands Park		
1979	California Surf	23	(0)
1980–1982	Highlands Park		
1983–1984	Wits University		
- * Club domestic league appearances and goals

Martin Cohen (born 3 February 1952) is a South African former professional association footballer who played for the Los Angeles Aztecs.

== Playing career ==
Cohen was born in Johannesburg, South Africa, and is Jewish. He was a starter for Highlands Park during the apartheid era of soccer in South Africa. He had trained with this club since the age of 10. On 20 April 1974, Cohen was part of the White XI that played their black counterparts in a racially charged match at Rand Stadium. After initially going down 1-0 to the black side (the goal was called off-side by referee Wally Turner), Cohen scored a crucial goal before Neil Roberts put the game away.

In 1975, Cohen won the South Africa's player of the year.

In December 1976 he signed with the Los Angeles Aztecs. He scored his first two goals in the first leg of the second round of the NASL playoffs against the Dallas Tornado as the Aztecs won 3-1. He played with the California Surf in 1979.

His son, Larry Cohen, is also a footballer.

== See also ==
- List of select Jewish football (association; soccer) players
