= Paul Cohen (disambiguation) =

Paul Cohen (1934–2007) was an American mathematician, winner of the Fields Medal.

Paul Cohen may also refer to:

- Paul Cohen (record producer) (1908–1970), American country music producer
- Paul Cohen (historian) (1934–2025), American historian of China
- Paul Cohen (designer) (born 1962), Australian industrial designer
- Paul Robert Cohen (born c. 1949), appellant in the 1971 U.S. Supreme Court case Cohen v. California
- Paul Cohen (saxophonist) (born c. 1950), American saxophonist and music teacher
- Paul Cohen (ice hockey) (born 1965), Canadian former professional ice hockey goaltender
- Paul Cohen (lawyer) (born 1967), British lawyer, author and arbitration counsellor
- Paul S. Cohen (born 1941), American linguist

== See also ==
- Paul Cohn (1924–2006), German-born professor of mathematics at University College, London
