= Moses Cohen =

15th-century Jewish writer

Moses ben Eliezer Cohen (Hebrew: משה בן אליעזר כהן) was a Jewish writer and moralist who lived in Germany, probably at Coblenz, in the second half of the 15th century.

== Work ==
Cohen was the author of an ethical work entitled "Sefer Ḥasidim" (Book of the Pious) written in 1473 and published by Schriftsetzer in Warsaw, 1866. This book, known also under the titles "Sefer haMaskil" (Book of the Wise) or "Sefer Ḥasidim Tinyana" (Second Book of the Pious), gives a brief description of Jewish piety as understood at that time, and contains some valuable contributions to the history of Jewish culture. The author often quotes the "Ḥayye 'Olam" of Isaac Ḥasid and the works of Judah haḤasid.
