= Aaron ben David Cohen of Ragusa =

Aaron ben David Cohen of Ragusa (born about 1580), was a Rabbi in the Republic of Ragusa who came from Lunela.

His maternal grandfather was Solomon Oheb, also a rabbi in the same city. Aaron studied in his native city and later in Venice, whence he returned to occupy a pulpit in Ragusa. In 1623 he was imprisoned as a supposed accomplice of Isaac Jeshurun, who had been falsely accused of ritual murder.

Rabbi Aaron's sermons, Zeḳan Aharon (Aaron's Beard), together with his grandfather's sermons, Shemen ha-Ṭob (The Good Oil), and the history of Isaac Jeshurun's martyrdom, were published at Venice in 1657, after his death.

Aaron's account of the alleged ritual murder, together with documents from the Ragusa archives, were published in 1882.
