= Richard Cohen =

Richard Cohen may refer to:

- Richard Cohen (columnist) (born 1941), syndicated columnist for the Washington Post
- Richard Cohen (fencer) (born 1947), British Olympic fencer and author of Chasing the Sun
- Richard Cohen (novelist) (born 1952), American novelist
- Richard A. Cohen (born 1952), advocate of conversion therapy
- Richard B. Cohen (born 1952), billionaire and owner of C&S Wholesale Grocers
- Richard E. Cohen, congressional correspondent for National Journal
- Richard I. Cohen (born 1946), professor of Jewish History at Hebrew University of Jerusalem
- Richard M. Cohen (1948–2024), journalist, television news producer, husband of Meredith Vieira
- Richard S. Cohen (1937–1998), American lawyer and Maine Attorney General
- Rich Cohen (born 1968), author of Tough Jews, The Avengers, Lake Effect, and Sweet and Low
- J. Richard Cohen, former president of the Southern Poverty Law Center
- Richard Cohen, New York City real estate developer and former husband of Paula Zahn
- Dick Cohen (born 1949), Minnesota state senator
