= Paul Cohen (designer) =

- Born: 4 June 1962 (age 64)
- Education: 1981–1985 South Australian College of Advanced Education. Degree – Bachelor of design–Industrial Design Top Student of the year 1979–1981 South Australia Certificate of arts and crafts 1984–1985 TAFE South Australia Certificate–CAD/CAM 1970–1979 St Peters College South Australia Matriculation
- Occupation: industrial designer
- Website: http://www.cube.net.au/ http://www.cubechina.net/

Paul Cohen (born 4 June 1962) is an industrial designer. Paul has won design awards, including becoming an Overall Winner of an Australian Design Award, Good Design Award USA, and Red Dot Germany.

== Career ==
After graduation, Paul joined a leading product design consultancy in Sydney. His training included working for several years under master Sony designer Masahiro Takahashi. In 2000, he jointly began Cube Sydney, and in 2004 expanded into Cube Design China. Cube is now a global business with an international client base.

In 2003, Paul created several unique designs for EcoSmart Fire, one of which has featured by Bang and Olufsen in Paris. Working with Breville in 2004, Paul helped to create a range of electric home appliances, including working on the Breville Ikon kettle and Breville variable temp kettle, both of which are now the largest selling kettles in the world (in excess of 1.5 million).

Many of his designs have been showcased on the covers of and within the pages of magazines, including Belle, Vogue and Wallpaper.

Paul has also worked with Midea and Breo.

In 2008, Paul began a new direction in his new career, expanding business into Shenzhen China. There, he was the guest of the Red Dot in China. Paul is also active in a variety of exhibitions, such as the International Creative Design Expo(Shenzhen). He currently divides his time between Australia and China.

=== Design ===
Besides the EcoSmart Fire system, one of Paul's most famous designs is the Breville IKON home appliance range. The Ikon kettle has sold over 1.5 million kettles per year. Other designs he has created for everyday use includes a Vodafone mobile phone, the Energizer 3-in1 flashlight, Johnson & Johnson tooth flosser, Midea air conditioners and many other consumer goods. He has stated that his aim it to develop more mass-produced products which embrace environmental factors.

=== Professional experience ===
Paul is the CEO of Cube Design China Limited. He now works in conjunction with large multinational Chinese companies, with a goal of helping to raise design standards in that country. His client list includes Midea, Joyoung, Shenzhen Breo, Top Electric Appliances, Saab Appliances, Fromone Homewares and many more.

In Sydney, he is the Co-Owner and a Director of Cube Industrial Design, where the clients include Breville, Blueye Eyewear, Johnson and Johnson, Hydro Surfing Products, Greentech products, Vodafone, Bang and Olufsen, Tupperware and Phillips.

Paul was also the managing director of Think Product Design until 2007, as well as Senior Designer at Design Recourse International, where his projects included working with clients such as AGL, Eveready, Black and Decker, Netcomm, IBM Australia and Sun Moon Star.

=== Additional professional activities ===
Paul has spoken at worldwide forums, served on judging panels and has lectured in industrial design.

- 2016 Guest Speaker of Istanbul Design Week
- 2016 Guest Speaker and Judge of Gold Panda Cultural Creativity and Design Award in Chengdu China
- 2015 Judge of CF Award
- 2015 IF Design Award Judge
- 2014 IF Design Award Judge
- 2012 Guest Speaker of IF Design Exhibition in Hainan China
- Honoured Guest speaker IODFCN design fair Conference China 2008
- Guest Speaker SOFA design forum 2008
- Guest Speaker ICIF forum 2006
- 2006 Standards Australia Design Awards Judge
- 2002 Standards Australia Design Awards Judge
- 2002 Expert Design witness April – June
- 2001 Newcastle University Judge
- 1994 – 2006 University of Technology Sydney Professor – Industrial Design course (teaching Industrial design projects and Illustration to years 1- 4)
- 1999 University of New South Wales, External Judge and Guest speaker
- 1999 University of Technology Sydney, Guest speaker
- 1995 University of New South Wales, lecturer – Industrial Design Masters course, Teaching Industrial Illustration

== Awards and honors ==
2010

- Joint Winner Red Dot Design awards Germany (espresso machine)

2008

- Winner Australian international design awards

2007

- Joint Winner Bronze at the IDEA, (International Design Excellence Awards USA) consumer products 2007. (Breville blender)
- Winner Home beautiful awards 2007, & 2006 ( smart fire )

2006

- Winner Home beautiful awards 2007, & 2006 ( smart fire )

2005
