= Michael Cohen (pharmacist) =

American pharmacist

- Education: Temple University
- Spouse: Hedy Cohen
- Awards: MacArthur Fellow
- Scientific career
- Fields: Pharmacy
- Workplaces: Institute for Safe Medication Practices

Michael Cohen is an American pharmacist, and president of the Institute for Safe Medication Practices (ISMP). He was a 2005 MacArthur Fellow.

== Life ==
He graduated from Temple University with a BS (1968) and MS (1984) in pharmacy. He has also been awarded honorary Doctor of Science degrees from Thomas Jefferson University, the University of the Sciences in Philadelphia and Long Island University, and an honorary Doctor of Public Service degree from the University of Maryland. He wrote a column for the journal Hospital Pharmacy. He writes a column for The Philadelphia Inquirer.

== Family ==
He was married to the late Hedy Goffman Cohen. Hedy was a registered nurse who worked with her husband at ISMP. They have two children, Rachel Cohen and Jennifer Gold.

== Works ==
- Medication errors (2 ed.). American Pharmacist Association. 2007. ISBN 978-1-58212-092-8.
