= Stanley Cohen =

Stan or Stanley Cohen may refer to:

- Stan Cohen (politician) (1927–2004), British Labour politician
- Stanley Cohen (attorney) (born 1953), attorney and human rights advocate
- Stanley Cohen (biochemist) (1922–2020), American Nobel Prize Laureate in Physiology and Medicine
- Stanley Cohen (physicist) (1927–2017), founder and president of Speakeasy Computing Corporation
- Stanley Cohen (sociologist) (1942–2013), Martin White Professor of Sociology at the London School of Economics
- Stanley G. Cohen (1928–2022), American music educator
- Stanley Norman Cohen (born 1935), American geneticist
