= Samuel Cohen =

Samuel Cohen may refer to:

- Sam Cohen (Australian politician) (1918–1969), Australian Senator
- Samuel Cohen (New South Wales politician) (1812–1861), member of the New South Wales Legislative Assembly
- Shmuel Cohen or Samuel, composer of the Israeli national anthem "Hatikvah"
- Sam Bohne (Samuel Arthur Cohen, 1896–1977), American Major League Baseball player
- Samuel "Mouli" Cohen (born 1958), Israeli-born American businessman
- Samuel T. Cohen (1921–2010), American physicist
- Sam Cohen (musician) (born 1979), American rock singer, songwriter and guitarist
- Sammy Cahn (1913–1993), American lyricist and musician, born Samuel Cohen

== See also ==
- Sam Waley-Cohen (born 1982), English amateur jockey and businessman
