= Harlan G. Cohen =

Harlan Grant Cohen is Professor of Law at Fordham University Law School in New York. Previously, he served as the Gabriel M. Wilner/UGA Foundation Professor in International Law at University of Georgia, where he taught courses on international law, U.S. foreign relations law, global governance, and international trade. Cohen also taught the international law colloquium, international human rights law, international business transactions, and international criminal law.

Cohen's scholarship focuses on international legal theory, global governance, international trade, and U.S. foreign relations law. Strands of his work focus on sources, authority, and fragmentation in international law, international law's communities of practice, the function of international courts and tribunals, the role of history in both international and foreign relations law, and the U.S. Supreme Court's approaches to foreign relations law questions. More recently, his work has focused on the future of trade and security policy in a shifting world order.

Cohen is Co-Editor-in-Chief of the American Journal of International Law, together with Neha Jain. He has previously served as a member of the Journal's Board of Editors and as vice president of the American Society of International Law. Cohen is also a member of the American Law Institute and Board of Editors of the Journal of International Economic Law.

Cohen talks about his views on international legal theory on Episode 9 of Borderline Jurisprudence: The Philosophy of International Law Podcast.

Cohen graduated from Yale University with a BA in History and International Studies, and returned for an MA in History. He attended law school at NYU and is admitted to practice in the state of New York.
