= Philip P. Cohen =

American chemist and medical researcher

Philip Pacy Cohen (September 28, 1908 – October 25, 1993) was an American chemist and a medical researcher, department head at the University of Wisconsin Medical School, "a pioneer in the study of human metabolism", a member of the National Academy of Sciences. He was also the Chairman of the National Research Council Committee on Growth, as well as Fellow of American Association for the Advancement of Science. The National Academies Press called him "a pioneer in studies of transamination reactions and in the investigation of urea production."

== Awards, distinctions and memberships ==
Cohen was an honorary member of the Chiba Medical Society of Japan, the Harvey Society, the Medical School Faculty of the University of Chile, the National Academy of Medicine of Mexico and the Japanese Biochemical Society.

== Life and career ==
Philip Pacy Cohen was born in Derry, New Hampshire. Cohen graduated from Tufts in 1930 with a B.S. degree. He received his Ph.D. in Physiological Chemistry from the University of Wisconsin in 1937. He then received an M.D. degree in 1938. Cohen died in Portland, Oregon.
