= Maurice Cohen =

Tunisian Mossad worker in Israel (1927–2006)

Maurice Cohen (Hebrew: מוריס כהן; 1927—2006) was a manager of a post office branch in Israel, who attended to incoming telegrams of the Mossad. A common confusion is that Maurice was a cryptographer for Mossad. His older brother was the celebrated Israeli spy Eli Cohen. He stated that he discovered his brother's identity through his decryption work.

Born in Tunisia, Maurice spent his life commemorating his brother's legacy and appealing to bring back Eli Cohen's bones to burial in Israel, which Syria refuses to do. He died in December 2006.
