= Abe Cohen =

American gridiron football player (1933–2001)

No. 62, 63
- Position: Guard

Personal information
- Born: March 23, 1933; Plymouth, Pennsylvania, U.S.
- Died: March 8, 2001 (aged 67); California, U.S.
- Listed height: 6 ft 0 in (1.83 m)
- Listed weight: 230 lb (104 kg)

Career information
- College: Chattanooga
- NFL draft: 1955: 26th round, 308th overall pick

Career history
- Hamilton Tiger-Cats (1958–1959); Boston Patriots (1960); Boston Sweepers (1963–1964)

Career AFL statistics
- Games played: 14
- Games started: 2
- Stats at Pro Football Reference

Abraham Cohen (March 23, 1933 – March 8, 2001) was an American professional football guard who played one season with the Boston Patriots of the American Football League (AFL). He was selected by the New York Giants in the 26th round of the 1955 NFL draft. He played college football at the University of Tennessee at Chattanooga. Cohen was also a member of the Hamilton Tiger-Cats of the Canadian Football League (CFL).

== College career ==
Cohen played for the Chattanooga Moccasins from 1954 to 1955. He also wrestled for the Moccasins. He won the Southern Intercollegiate Wrestling Association (SIWA) championship in the 190 pound weight class in 1954. Cohen then won the SIWA heavyweight championship in 1955 and 1956. He was inducted into the UTC Athletics Hall of Fame in 1990.

== Professional career ==
Cohen was selected by the New York Giants of the National Football League (NFL) in the 26th round with the 308th overall pick in the 1955 NFL draft. He later played for Fort Hood in the Shrimp Bowl in 1957. He was a member of the Hamilton Tiger-Cats of the CFL from 1958 to 1959. Cohen signed with the Boston Patriots of the AFL in June 1960 and played in fourteen games for the team during the 1960 season.
