= Larry Cohen (soccer) =

South African soccer player

Personal information
- Full name: Larry Jason Cohen
- Date of birth: 7 November 1987 (age 38)
- Place of birth: Johannesburg, South Africa
- Positions: Central defender; defensive midfielder

Youth career
- Highlands Park
- Balfour Park
- Corinthians F.C. (South Africa)

Senior career*
| Years | Team | Apps | (Gls) |
| 2007–2010 | Jomo Cosmos | 48 | (2) |
| 2010–2011 | Wits University | | |
| 2012 | Witbank Spurs | 25 | (2) |
| 2012 | Mpumalanga Black Aces | 0 | (0) |
| 2012–2013 | Chippa United | 22 | (2) |
| 2013–2015 | Moroka Swallows | 57 | (3) |
| 2015–2016 | Ajax Cape Town | 0 | (0) |
| Total | | 152 | (9) |
- * Club domestic league appearances and goals as of 3 June 2012 ‡ National team caps and goals as of 12 March 2015

Larry Cohen (born 7 November 1987) is a former South African professional soccer player of Lithuanian descent who last played for Ajax Cape Town.

== Personal ==
Larry Cohen was born to Martin Cohen, one of South Africa's prominent footballers in the 1970s.

On 21 November 2014, Cohen's application of the reinstation of the Lithuanian nationality was approved and he became a Lithuanian citizen. He received his first call up for the Lithuanian national football team for the UEFA Euro 2016 qualifying match against England, but FIFA did not allow Cohen to play for Lithuania.

== Playing career ==
After four seasons with Ezenkosi, Cohen signed with Wits in 2010.
