= Abraham Cohen (editor) =

Jewish-British scholar (1887–1957)

Rabbi Abraham Cohen

Abraham Cohen (1887 in Reading, Berkshire – 1957) was a Jewish-British scholar. Cohen was the editor of the Soncino Books of the Bible and participated in the Soncino translation of the Talmud and Midrash.

Abraham Cohen attended the University of London and Cambridge. In 1933, he became the minister of Birmingham Hebrew Congregation. He was an active participant in the World Jewish Congress and the Zionist movement. He was President of the Board of Deputies of British Jews from 1949 to 1955.

== Published works ==
- Ancient Jewish Proverbs (1911)
- The Babylonian Talmud: Tractate Berakot (1921)
- Everyman's Talmud: The Major Teachings of the Rabbinic Sages (1932)
- The Parting of the Ways: Judaism and the Rise of Christianity (1954)
- Introduction and commentary, The Psalms (1950)
- The Five Megilloth: With Hebrew Text, English Translation, and Commentary (1952)
