= Hermann Cohen (Carmelite) =

German Jewish pianist and Carmelite priest

Servant of God Augustine Mary of the Blessed Sacrament OCD
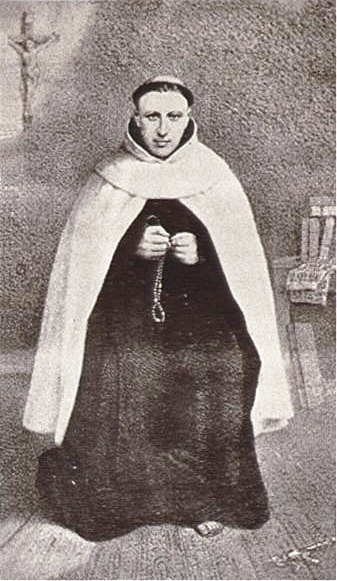
- Born: 10 November 1820; Hamburg, German Confederation
- Died: 20 January 1871 (aged 50); Berlin, Kingdom of Prussia, German Empire

Hermann Cohen, religious name Augustine Mary of the Blessed Sacrament, French: Augustin-Marie du Très Saint-Sacrement; 10 November 1820 – 20 January 1871) was a noted German Jewish pianist, who was baptised in to the Roman Catholic Church.

He became a Discalced Carmelite priest involved in re-establishing the order in both France and England. He was a popular preacher throughout Europe, and was instrumental in introducing the widespread practice of nocturnal adoration of the Blessed Sacrament. The Archbishop of Bordeaux, Jean-Pierre Ricard, opened Augustin Maria Cohen's beatification process in April 2016.

== Life ==
=== Early life and musical career ===
Cohen was born in Hamburg, one of the four children of David Abraham Cohen and Rosalie Benjamin, part of a large and prosperous Jewish banking family. Although not pious, his parents were members of the Reform Judaism movement there and taught their son Hebrew and the basics of the Jewish faith.

A gifted student, at the age of 4 he began to study the piano, at which he soon became accomplished. Praised by his teacher, who had arranged successful concerts for him at the age of 7 in Altona and Frankfurt, he became the spoiled focus of the family's attention. From his teacher, he also acquired a serious gambling habit, which was to plague him for many years. At the age of 12, his mother resolved to take him to Paris to advance his musical training, against the wishes of her husband, who was experiencing financial difficulties. Undeterred, she approached the Grand Dukes George of Mecklenburg-Strelitz and Francis I of Mecklenburg-Schwerin, in order to obtain their financial support for her son. Successful in her quest, she took her children and moved to Paris. The family arrived there in July 1834, only to learn that, as a foreigner, Hermann was denied admission to the famed Paris Conservatory.

==== Franz Liszt ====
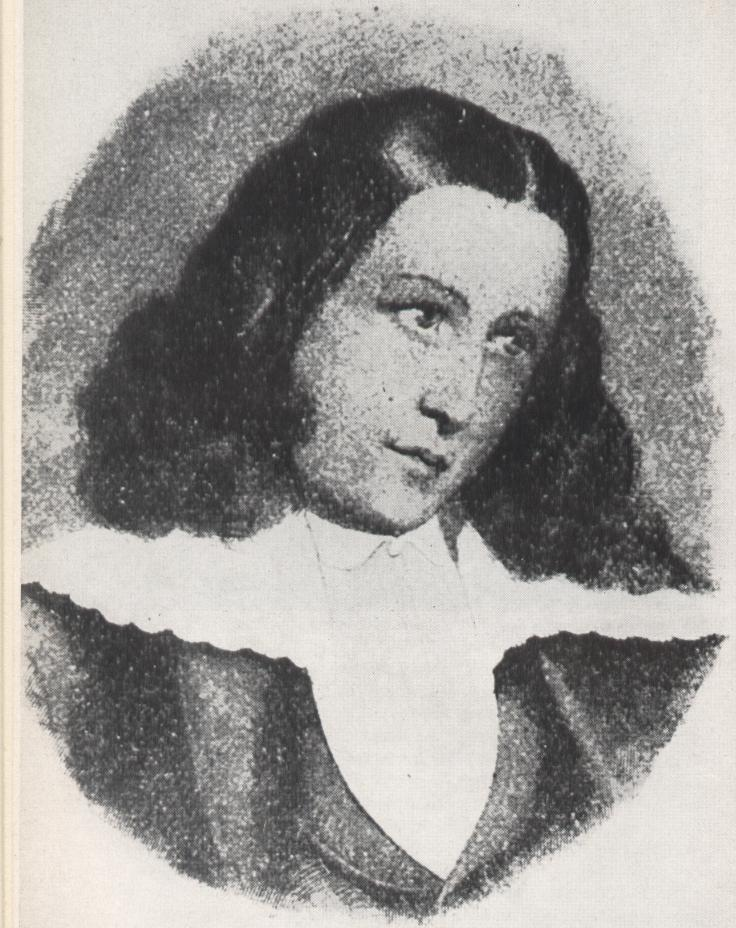
Youth image of Hermann Cohen (1835)

This rejection led to a significant direction in Cohen's life. Rosalie Cohen was able to persuade the renowned pianist Franz Liszt to take her son on as a pupil. Despite his early reluctance, after hearing him play and taken by his good looks, Liszt accepted him as a pupil. Cohen soon became his favorite student. As Liszt himself had been nicknamed Putzig (German for "little cute guy") by his own teacher, Carl Czerny, he began to call Cohen Puzzi, a diminutive form of the word. Liszt accepted Cohen into his social circle, introducing him to his friends, the author George Sand and the Abbé de Lamennais, who both also became charmed by the boy. Sand began to dote on the boy and called him Le Mélancolique Puzzi. Lamennais gave the young Jewish boy an autographed copy of his work, Paroles d'un croyant — for which the priest had just been excommunicated by Pope Gregory XVI — with the inscription: Souvenirs offerts à mon cher petit Puzzi.

The following June, Liszt left Paris without warning with his new lover, the Countess Marie d'Agoult, and moved to Geneva, where he began to teach at the recently founded Geneva Conservatory of Music. Devastated by the sudden loss of his mentor, Cohen persisted in begging Liszt to allow him to join him there, to which Liszt eventually relented. Cohen's arrival in the Liszt circle in Geneva soon earned him the long-held enmity of the countess. His abilities continued to grow under Liszt's watchful eye. On 1 October 1835 Cohen played in a concert sponsored by the Princess Cristina Trivulzio Belgiojoso. Together with Liszt and two other pianists, he played in a four-piano Brilliant Potpourri on folk airs by Czerny. That same month Liszt entrusted the boy with 10 students of his own. At age 13, Cohen's career appeared headed for greatness.

By then Cohen had become Liszt's constant companion, accompanying him and the countess on their holiday trips through the Swiss countryside. He was with them and Sand on a notorious trip to Chamonix. He later wrote, Circumstances led me into the interior of a family unsanctified by the marriage ties. As dissolute as the circle appeared to the world, Liszt felt himself responsible for the boy's moral as well as his professional development and Cohen was touched when Liszt gave him a Bible. Cohen felt a deep religious experience in the course of one trip, when Liszt played an improvisation of the Dies Irae from Mozart's Requiem on the Grand Organ of the Fribourg Cathedral.

In 1837 Liszt and his circle returned to Paris, where the princess had arranged for a famed competition between him and his greatest rival of the period, Sigismond Thalberg. She came to know Cohen at that time and became a friend and patron. When his increasing debts threatened to drown him, she arranged for a concert, which was to prove unsuccessful, apparently due to his lack of training from the idle lifestyle of gambling and dissolution he had adopted. The shock of this failure led Cohen to return to Hamburg, where he sought help from his father. Alone and in financial straits himself, the elder Cohen had no interest in helping his son. Cohen then turned to a former patron, Grand Duke George of Mecklenburg-Strelitz, who sponsored several concerts for him to raise funds. They were successful enough to allow him to return to Paris. There he met a popular Italian singer named Mario, with whom he formed a partnership. The duo traveled to London, where Cohen improved his skills and experienced a number of successes with their concerts.

Again saddled with debts, by 1839 Cohen began to be estranged from his mentors, both Liszt and the princess, as a result of his lifestyle. The Countess d'Agoult used an affair he had with a married woman in her campaign in an attempt to discredit him in Liszt's eyes, who nonetheless kept Cohen as his companion for his concert tours around Europe until the end of 1840. His ties to Liszt were not without their own consequences. Friedrich Wieck, father of the future Clara Schumann, began to criticize publicly both Liszt and Cohen in the newspapers in Leipzig. He was furious at Liszt for supporting Robert Schumann in his own lawsuit against Wieck: "To show cause why his twenty-year-old daughter Clara should not marry Schumann". Liszt shrugged off the charges but Cohen did not and took Wieck to court, where he won his case.

The year 1841 saw a final rupture between Cohen and Liszt, when the teenager was accused of embezzling funds from some concerts Liszt had given in Dresden. He was unable to persuade Liszt of his innocence. He felt his life had been wrecked, later calling this experience the result of "a plot hatched in hell". He spent the next five years traveling around Europe with his mother and his sister Henriette, playing concerts and composing works for the piano.

=== Conversion ===
Cohen settled in Paris in October 1846, where he shared an apartment with an artist friend. The following spring he met and fell in love with a popular circus rider, Celeste Mogadar, with whom he shared a deep love of music. The relationship soon ended, however, when he broke it off abruptly, indicating that he felt called to place his life in the hands of God. Cohen had the strong feeling that his previous life seem questionable and pointless and began to seek spiritual guidance.

One day he substituted a choir director at a Catholic service. In May 1847, while leading the choir at an Eucharistic exposition and benediction at the Church of Sainte-Valérie, Cohen became overwhelmed by an intense experience of being touched by divine grace. He later wrote: "During the ceremony, nothing affected me much, but at the moment of benediction, though I was not kneeling like the rest of the congregation, I felt something deep within me as if I had found myself. It was like the prodigal son facing himself … When I returned the following Friday, the same thing happened; and I thought of becoming a Catholic." After a journey to Ems he resolved to do so.

Cohen was introduced to Marie Theodor Ratisbonne, a fellow Jewish convert, who, in turn introduced him to the Abbé Legrande. Under his instruction, Cohen became to know the Catholic faith and was baptized as Marie-Augustin Henri on 28 August, the feast day of his patron saint Augustine of Hippo. The baptism took place in the Chapel of Our Lady of Zion, in the presence of Ratisbonne, its founder, and many Jewish Catholics. At his baptism, he experienced an apparition of Christ, the Blessed Virgin Mary, and a multitude of saints, all bathed in a brilliant light, as well as an overwhelming experience of love.

Cohen received the sacrament of confirmation on 3 December 1847 from the Archbishop of Paris, Denis Auguste Affre. With the support of Jean-Baptiste de Bouillé, the Archbishop of Poitiers, out of his own experience, he immediately began efforts to popularize the practice of the nocturnal adoration of the Blessed Sacrament by the general faithful.

Cohen soon felt called to be a priest. He first approached the Benedictines of the Solesmes Abbey, who were known for their studies for the revival of Gregorian chant. They declined his application. Next he turned to Jean-Baptiste Henri Lacordaire, OP, who was in the process of re-establishing the Order of Preachers in France, after its destruction during the French Revolution. Lacordaire counseled Cohen to find an order whose ideals were more eremitic than that the Dominicans. Cohen then turned to the more austere branch of the Carmelites, the Discalced, who follow the reforms of the Spanish mystics, Teresa of Ávila and John of the Cross. Cohen felt called to this order originated on Mount Carmel under the prophet Elijah. Being a recent convert was a barrier to his admission, however, due to Church law, which required a personal visit to Rome to obtain a dispensation.

=== Discalced Carmelite ===
Cohen gave a farewell concert which cleared his debts, required before he could be admitted to enter the Carmel, in the days before the Revolution of 1848. Instead of joining the fight in the streets, he was at his favorite devotion, spending the night in adoration before the exposed Blessed Sacrament. He entered the novitiate of the Discalced Carmelites at Le Broussey, in Rions, France, on 19 July of that year and received the religious habit on 6 October 1849, being given the religious name Augustine Mary of the Blessed Sacrament. He made his first vows on 7 October 1850. He then began to study theology. In this he faced a major challenge, as his formal education had stopped at the age of ten. Having been granted an exemption from some of the required courses, he was ordained a priest on 19 April 1851.

Once ordained, Cohen launched himself into a ministry of preaching, which was to lead him to all the capitals of Europe. He preached to thousands in Geneva, Bordeaux, Lyon, and in Paris before huge crowds in prominent churches, such as Saint-Sulpice and Sainte-Clotilde. The poet, Charles Baudelaire, wrote that he found Cohen's sermons fascinating. His fiery eloquence and the interest caused by his conversion made him a popular preacher, despite his limited studies. He became a main figure in the restoration of the Carmelites in France, taking an active role in the founding of several priories of friars in the south of France: Bagnères-de-Bigorre (1853), Lyon (1857) and a hermitage in Tarasteix, near Lourdes (1857).

==== Reconciliation ====
By 1852, Cohen and Liszt, who was known for his generosity of spirit, had renewed their association through correspondence. Cohen invited his former mentor to visit him in France, which Liszt, by then living in Weimar, was unable to do. Several years later, Liszt's daughter with the countess reported to her father that her mother had undergone a change of heart and had come to admire Cohen. Liszt returned the offer in 1857, pleading illness for not being able to travel.

In June 1862, both Cohen and Liszt happened to be in Rome. By this time, Liszt was himself a cleric, being in minor orders and a Franciscan tertiary. They met for the first time in years, spending three weeks together, playing music and walking in the Colosseum. By that time, his mother, Maria Anna Liszt, had ceased to view Cohen with the antisemitism she had exhibited all her life prior to that.

==== Mission to England ====
Cohen's fame as a preacher led to an invitation by Cardinal Wiseman to come to England to re-establish the Carmelite order, after its suppression in the Dissolution of the monasteries in the 16th century, for which he received a papal blessing from Pius IX. Cohen arrived in London in 1862, having £7 to support his work. He opened the new priory with a public religious procession, the first held by English Catholics since the time of the Tudors. He gained further public attention to his ministry in 1864, when he faced a jeering crowd while administering the Last Rites to six Catholic sailors about to be hanged on the gallows of Newgate Prison. He was lauded for his bravery by The Times of London.

=== Final days ===
In 1867 Cohen retired to the hermitage he had founded in Tarasteix, France. During this period, his eyesight began to fail and he was diagnosed with glaucoma. Spurning the surgery prescribed by his doctors, he chose to make a pilgrimage to the Shrine of Our Lady of Lourdes. Bathing his eyes there from the miraculous spring attributed to the shrine, his sight was immediately restored. He then returned to his life of solitude in France fully cured, living there in peace for the next few years.

Cohen's life was uprooted, however, by the outbreak of the Franco-Prussian War in 1870, when all German nationals were expelled from France. Even though he was exempted by the French government, and his surviving immediate family were living in France, he chose to go into exile in Geneva, Switzerland that following October. He soon heard of the large numbers of French prisoners being held in Spandau Prison, just outside Berlin at that time. Despite his failing health, he volunteered to minister to them, and moved to Berlin in November. He found a facility crammed with over 5,000 prisoners living in squalid conditions, of whom some ten percent were suffering from serious infectious diseases, including smallpox.

As the prison chaplain, Cohen worked tirelessly to alleviate the needs of the French prisoners, distributing relief supplies in addition to his spiritual services. He said daily Mass, regularly drawing 500 attendees, and heard frequent confessions. He administered the Last rites to two prisoners with his own hands instead of the prescribed spatula. Within two months, he began to exhibit the symptoms of smallpox himself, dying on 19 January 1871.

== Veneration ==
Augustine Mary of the Blessed Sacrament's remains were buried in the crypt of St. Hedwig's Cathedral in Berlin. After the destruction of the church during World War II his remains were transferred to the cathedral cemetery. In 2008, Cohen's relics were elevated and transferred to the priory in Le Broussey where he had been novice master. In 2016, his beatification process was opened.

== Works of Augustin-Marie ==
- Le Catholicisme en Angleterre, a speech delivered at Mechlin, also in English (Paris, 1864)
- Gloire à Marie (1849)
- Amour à Jésus (1851)
- His musical setting for the Holy Mass (1856)
- Fleurs du Carmel (1870)
- Couronnement de la Madonne (1870)
- Thabor (1870), five collections of sacred songs with accompaniment
