= Arthur Juda Cohen =

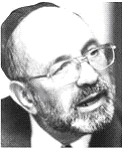
- Arthur Juda Cohen
- Born: 19 January 1910; Hamburg, Germany
- Died: 22 December 2000 (aged 90); Amsterdam, Netherlands
- Occupation(s): Dutch Resistance Fighter, Day School Founder
- Spouse: Rosette Jacobsen
- Children: Mirjam Chana Tikva, Jitschak Jeroecham, Wim, Chaja Sarah, Awraham Arje, Jonathan Nissim, Hitzele Ayeleth, Hadassa

Arthur Juda (Adje Cohen, Uri Yehuda Cohen, Aart Gerardus Lekskes) Cohen (19 January 1910 – 22 December 2000) was a member of the Dutch Underground resistance movement, and after World War II he was instrumental in the re-establishment of the Jewish community in Rotterdam; as late as the mid-1970s, when already in his 60s, he established a school for strictly orthodox boys and girls in Amsterdam, known as the "Cheider". Adje Cohen was also responsible for the rescue of Iranian-Jewish refugees to the Netherlands. Between 1987 and 1997 he brought over 3000 Iranian Jews from Pakistan to safer places. In 1991 he set up an airlift for Jewish children from the radio-active Chernobyl area to Israel.

== Early years ==
Adje Cohen was born in Hamburg, Germany on 19 January 1910. His father was Avrohom Arye Cohen, a Jewish Dutch citizen. His mother was Hitzel Kohn, a Jewish German citizen. Adje attended the Breuer-yeshiva in Frankfurt aM. The fact that his father was a Dutch citizen allowed the Cohens' entry back into the Netherlands in 1933 as Hitler rose to power.

== Dutch Resistance ==
The Dutch resistance used various methods to incapacitate the Germans during World War II. One method would include blowing up German fighter planes on Gilze Rijen airbase, another was by having the good looking girls give German soldiers poisonous chocolates while on dates. Additionally the Resistance helped Jews escape often by hiding them beneath the passenger of a motorcycle sidecar. After the liberation, Adje was among a group honored by Queen Wilhelmina for their efforts during the war. He refused the Resistance Cross, because as a Jew he did not feel comfortable wearing a cross.

== Cheider ==
In 1974 Adje Cohen began Jewish classes with five children in his home. This grew into an Orthodox Jewish school that provides education for children from kindergarten to high school. Many Orthodox families would have left the Netherlands if not for the existence of the Cheider: in the Cheider, boys and girls learn separately, and ultra-religious families would without separate schools move to other countries. By 1993 the Cheider had grown to over 230 pupils and 60 staff members. The Cheider moved to its current building at Zeelandstraat in Amsterdam's Buitenveldert. Many prominent Dutch figures attended the opening, most noteworthy of which was Princess Margriet who opened the new building.

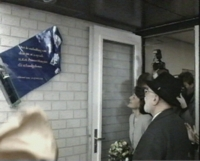
Princess Margriet opening the Cheider with Arthur Juda Cohen

== Iranian Jewish Refugees ==
Adje Cohen was responsible for the rescue of Iranian-Jewish refugees to the Netherlands. Between 1987 and 1997 he brought over 3000 Iranian Jews from Turkey and Pakistan to safer places.

== Chernobyl disaster ==
The nuclear disaster of 1986 left many people in the Chernobyl with a variety of diseases. In 1991 Adje set up an airlift from Minsk, Byelorussia to Israel for affected children.
