= Donald Atherton Cohen =

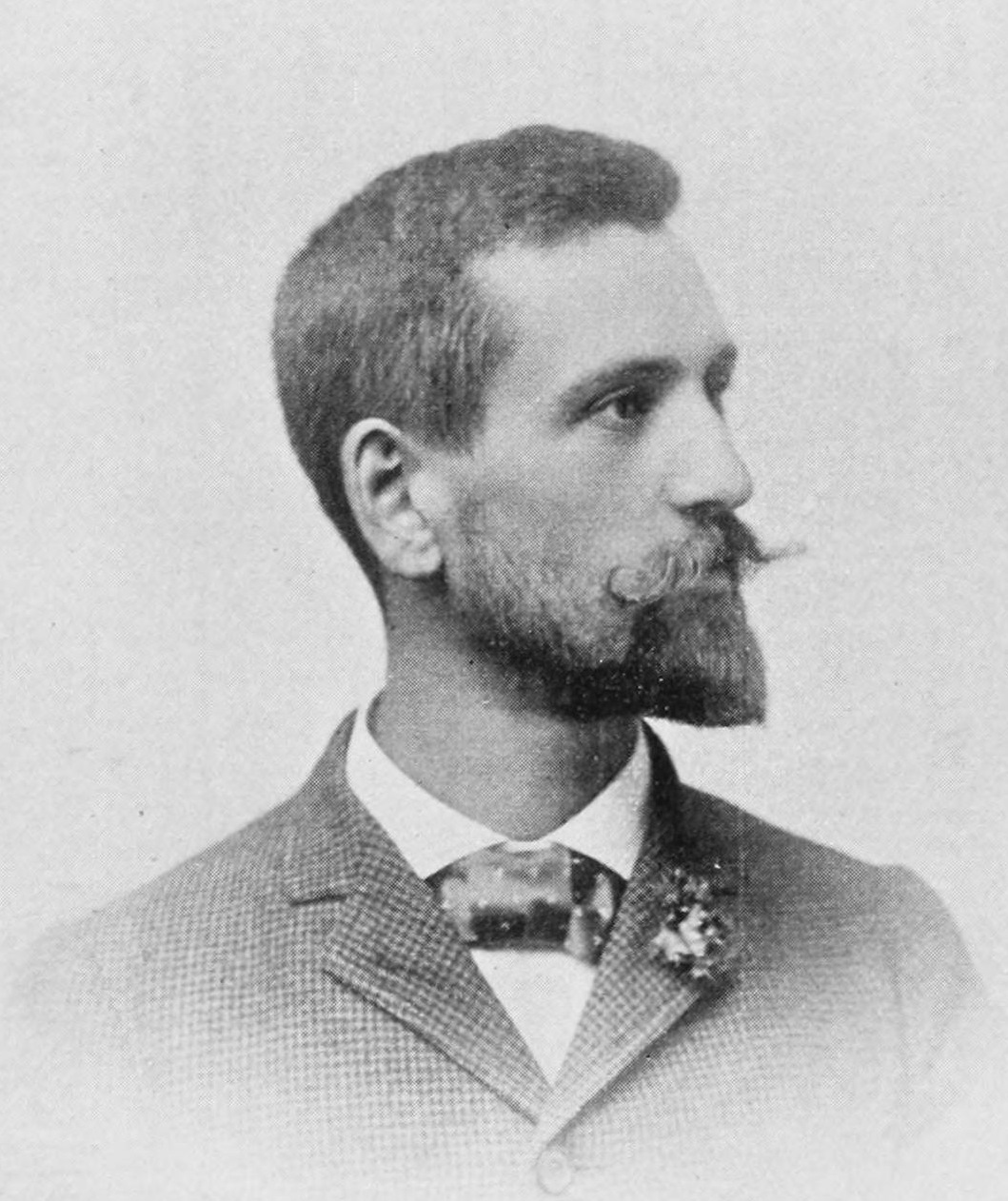

Donald Atherton Cohen (17 April 1870 – 18 August 1943) was a Californian ornithologist and bird conservationist. He was a member of the Cooper Ornithological Club and a manager of its "northern division" from 1899 to 1901.

== Life and work ==
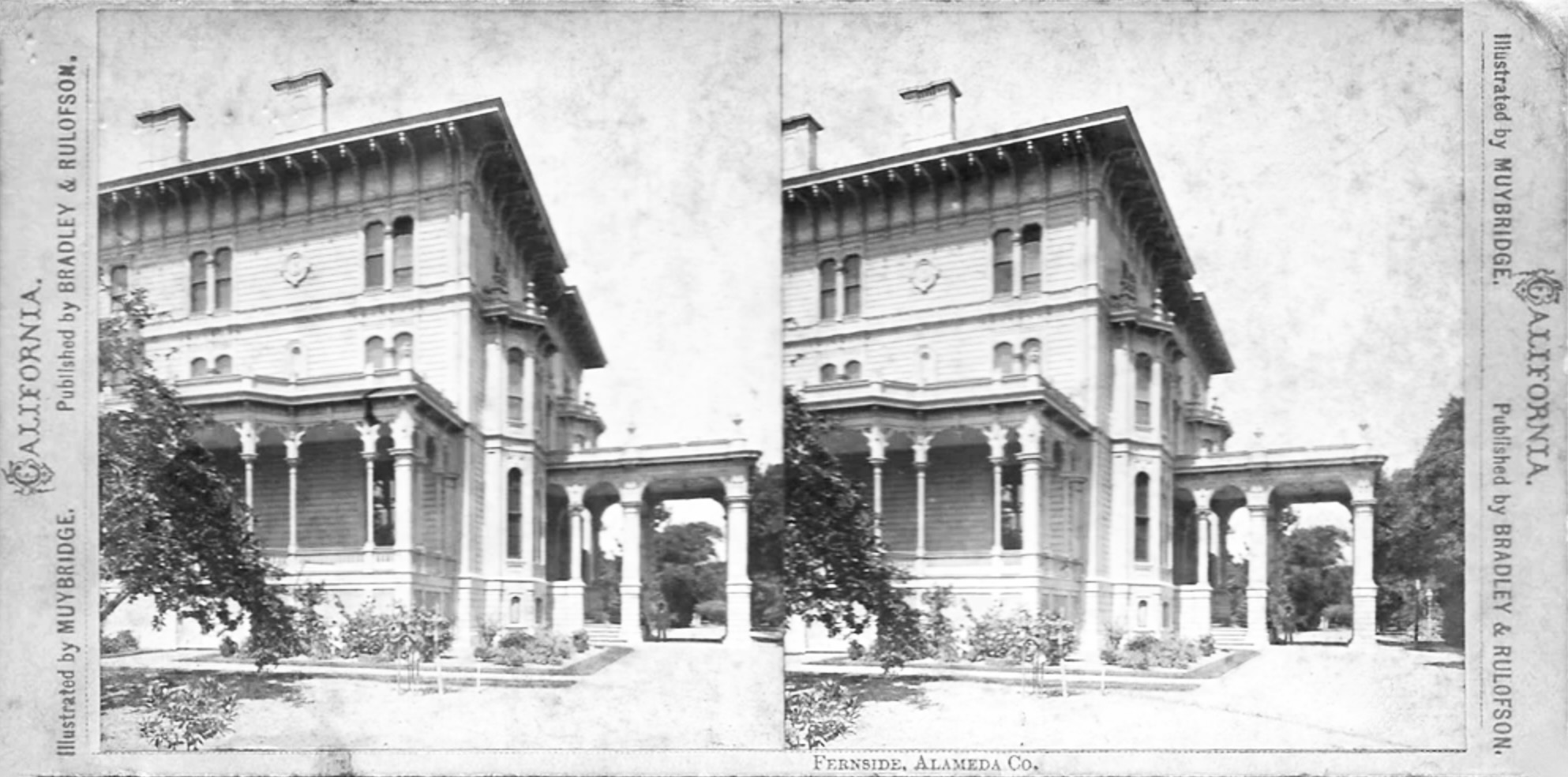
Fernside Manor (stereophotograph by Eadward Muybridge) burned down in 1897

Cohen was born at Fernside Park, Alameda, to attorney and railroad financier Alfred Andrew (1829–1887) and Emilie née Gibbons. His maternal grandfather Henry Gibbons (1808-1884) was a noted physician and professor of medicine at Cooper Medical College in San Francisco, belonging to an influential Quaker family and a founding member of the California Academy of Sciences. The family had a fifty-room mansion. He was educated in New York and Europe before returned to work. He purchased a farm in 1926 outside Hayward and spent his spare time setting up a collection of birds. In the 1890's he was a keen bird observer and collector and edited the California section of the magazine "The Osprey". The magazine later gave little space to the Cooper Club which led to the creation of the Bulletin of the Cooper Ornithological Club. The northern division of the club often met at his home. He sought protection of the "California clapper rail" (Ridgway's rail) which was being threatened in the swamps of Alameda by hunting. The egg collections made by Donald and his brother Edgar are now held at the Alameda Museum.
