= Abraham Cohen de Herrera =

Jewish religious philosopher and cabbalist

Abraham Cohen de Herrera (Hebrew: רבי אברהם כהן בן דוד דה-הירירה), also known as Alonso Nunez de Herrera or Abraham Irira (c. 1570 – c. 1635), was a religious philosopher and cabbalist (a student of Israel Sarug, who was one of Isaac Luria's disciples). He is supposed by the historian Heinrich Graetz to have been born in 1570. He is widely supposed to have been descended from a Marrano family: place of birth is unknown but may (according to Barbosa Machado the biographer) have been Lisbon, Portugal. Other sources link him to Italy, specifically Livorno, Tuscany, and as the son of the last Chief Rabbi of Córdoba in Spain.

He is known to have married a Sara de Herrera in Amsterdam in 1600; however, it is unlikely that this is the wife's original surname. It is also reasonably certain that he had an uncle, Juan de Marchena, who worked as a factor for the Sultan of Morocco Moulay, Ahmad al-Mansur.

While in Cádiz on the Sultan's business, Herrera is supposed to have been captured by the English, was released again after an exchange of diplomatic correspondence between the Sultan and Queen Elizabeth I, and travelled thereafter to Amsterdam, where he returned to Judaism. His date of death is between 1635 and 1639: Wiener believes it was 1635. According to Rodriguez de Castro he may have died in Vienna. He wrote several works, originally in Spanish but later (in accordance with his will) translated to Hebrew.

== Works ==
- The following works by Herrera, in Spanish, are known: (1) Puerta del Cielo, expounding kabbalistic doctrine about God and the cosmos. (2) Casa de Dios, which deals mainly with theories about angels and pneumatology. Both works remained unpublished in the original for centuries (manuscripts are to be found in the library Eẓ Ḥayyim at Amsterdam and in the Royal Library of Holland), but were translated into Hebrew by Isaac Aboab da Fonseca and published under the title Sha'ar ha-Shamayim (Amsterdam, 1655), and Beit Elohim (Amsterdam, 1655), and reprinted many times.
- Puerta Del Cielo, a discourse on kabbalah and religious themes of Judaism, Christianity, and Islam, in relation to Occidentalism and Platonic philosophy. Among few texts of the Kabbalah written and directed toward common readership; criticized as such. Translated into English by Kenneth Krabbenhoft, ISBN 978-90-04-12253-6.
- Epistle on Shiur Qomah, an attempted reconciliation between kabbalah and philosophy. However, as Alexander Altmann, writes "Herrera was too much of a genuine philosopher to believe in the possibility of a fusion of the two realms, and he was too much of a genuine kabbalist to wish for it."
- Abraham Cohen Herrera, Epitome y Compendio de la Logica o Dialectica, reprinted and edited by Giuseppa Saccaro Del Buffa, with a critical introduction in English, CLUEB, Bologna, 2002.

== Sources ==
- Jewish Encyclopedia (1906) entry on "HERRERA, ALONZO DE (known also as Abraham Cohen de Herrera)" by Kaufmann Kohler and Meyer Kayserling
- Encyclopaedia Judaica (2007) entry on "Herrera, Abraham Kohen De" by Jacob Gordin
- Bartleby.com, German Jewish Encyclopaedia, independent genealogical research.
