= Abraham Cohen Pimentel =

17th century Amsterdam rabbi

Abraham Cohen Pimentel (died March 21, 1697) was a rabbi of Amsterdam. He was a student of Saul Levi Morteira, and he also served as hakham of the synagogue in Hamburg and was initially a signator to a letter of approbation for Sabbatai Zevi. He was the author of the Minchat Kohen, published in 1668.
