= Abraham Cohen Bucureșteanu =

- Born: 1840; Bucharest, Wallachia
- Died: January 24, 1877 (aged 36–37); Bucharest, Principality of Romania
- Resting place: Bucharest Sephardic Jewish Cemetery
- Spouse: Luțica Căhănescu

Abraham Cohen Bucureșteanu (1840 – January 24, 1877) was a Romanian poet, songwriter, and publicist. He is credited as the first Jew to write verse in the Romanian language.

== Biography ==
Abraham Cohen Bucureșteanu was born into a Sephardic Jewish family in Bucharest in 1840. His father, Moise Elias Cohen, was a wealthy banker. Bucureșteanu initially pursued a career in theatre and obtained some success as an actor, but at the urging of his family he shifted his focus to commerce.

Between 1860 and 1874, Bucureșteanu wrote numerous satirical poems, epigrams, love songs, theatrical sketches, and anecdotes that were well received by the public across social classes. While his songs were included in numerous popular collections, he himself only published two works during his lifetime: Urdubelea și Norocul (Bucharest, 1873) and Buchetul, Culegere de Anecdote (Bucharest, 1874).

Alongside Benjamin F. Peixotto and others, Bucureșteanu was in 1872 a founder of the Infratirea Zion Jewish fraternal association, and served as its first president. The organization later affiliated with the Order of B'nai B'rith as the Zion Grand Lodge.

Bucureșteanu led a turbulent personal life, which ultimately contributed to his physical decline and premature death from tuberculosis in 1877.
