= Jeffrey A. Cohen =

American neurologist

- Born: October 14, 1954 (age 70)
- Scientific career
- Institutions: Cleveland Clinic (Staff Neurologist)

Jeffrey Alan Cohen (born October 14, 1954) is an American neurologist specializing in multiple sclerosis and Director of Experimental Neurotherapeutics at the Cleveland Clinic Mellen Center for Multiple Sclerosis.

== Education ==
B.A. - Connecticut College, New London, Connecticut M.D. - University of Chicago Pritzker School of Medicine Chicago, Illinois Postdoctoral training - Neurology - University of Pennsylvania

== Notable contributions ==
- Global Principal Investigator of the ACT (Avonex Combination Trial) clinical trial
- Global Principal Investigator of the TRANSFORMS Phase III trial of Fingolimod, a novel oral agent for use in treating Multiple Sclerosis, the primary results of which were presented at the American Academy of Neurology Annual Meeting in May 2009.
- Global Principal Investigator of the IMPACT trial, the first study to use the MS Functional Composite as the primary outcome measure in a clinical trial.
- Co-Editor of the textbook "Multiple Sclerosis Therapeutics", ISBN 1841845256
- Fellowship Director of the Mellen Center for MS National Multiple Sclerosis Society-supported Fellowship
