= Repatriation =

Return of a thing or person to their country

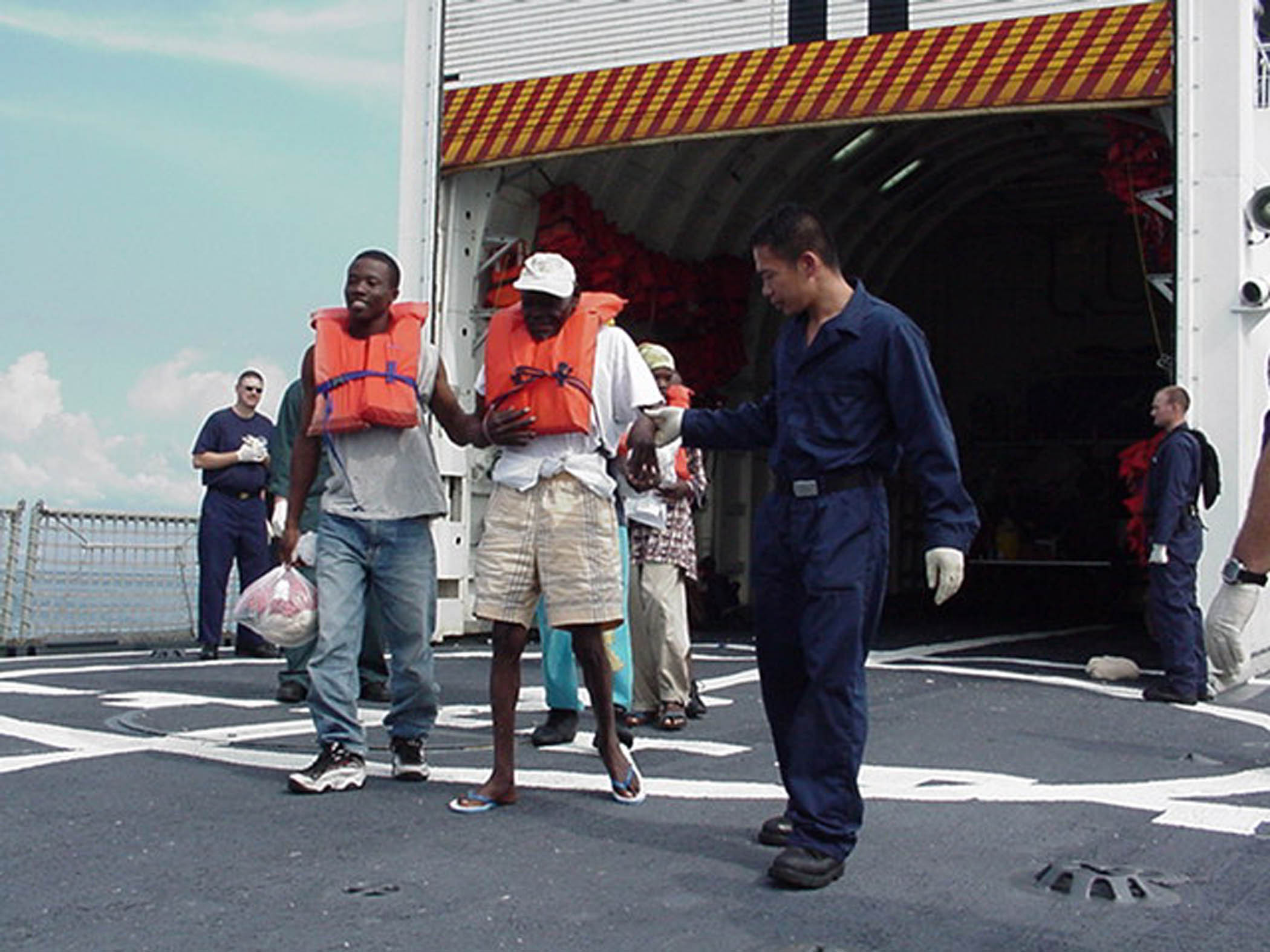
Haitian migrants are escorted off the Coast Guard Cutter Tampa's fantail to an awaiting Haitian Coast Guard vessel during repatriation.

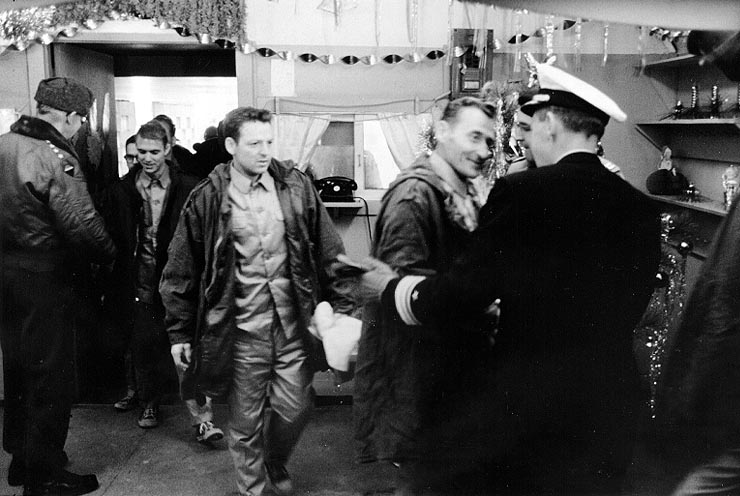
The crew of USS Pueblo as it arrives at the U.N. Advance Camp, Korean Demilitarized Zone, on 23 December 1968, following their release by the North Korean government

Repatriation is the return of a thing or person to its or their country of origin. The term may refer to non-human entities, such as converting a foreign currency into the currency of one's own country, as well as the return of military personnel to their place of origin following a war. It also applies to diplomatic envoys, international officials as well as expatriates and migrants in time of international crisis. For refugees, asylum seekers and illegal migrants, repatriation can mean either voluntary return or deportation.

== Repatriation of humans ==
=== Voluntary vs. forced return ===
Voluntary return is the return of eligible persons, such as refugees, to their country of origin or citizenship based on freely expressed willingness to such return. Voluntary return, unlike expulsion and deportation, which are actions of sovereign states, is defined as a personal right under specific conditions described in various international instruments, such as the OAU Convention, along with customary international law.

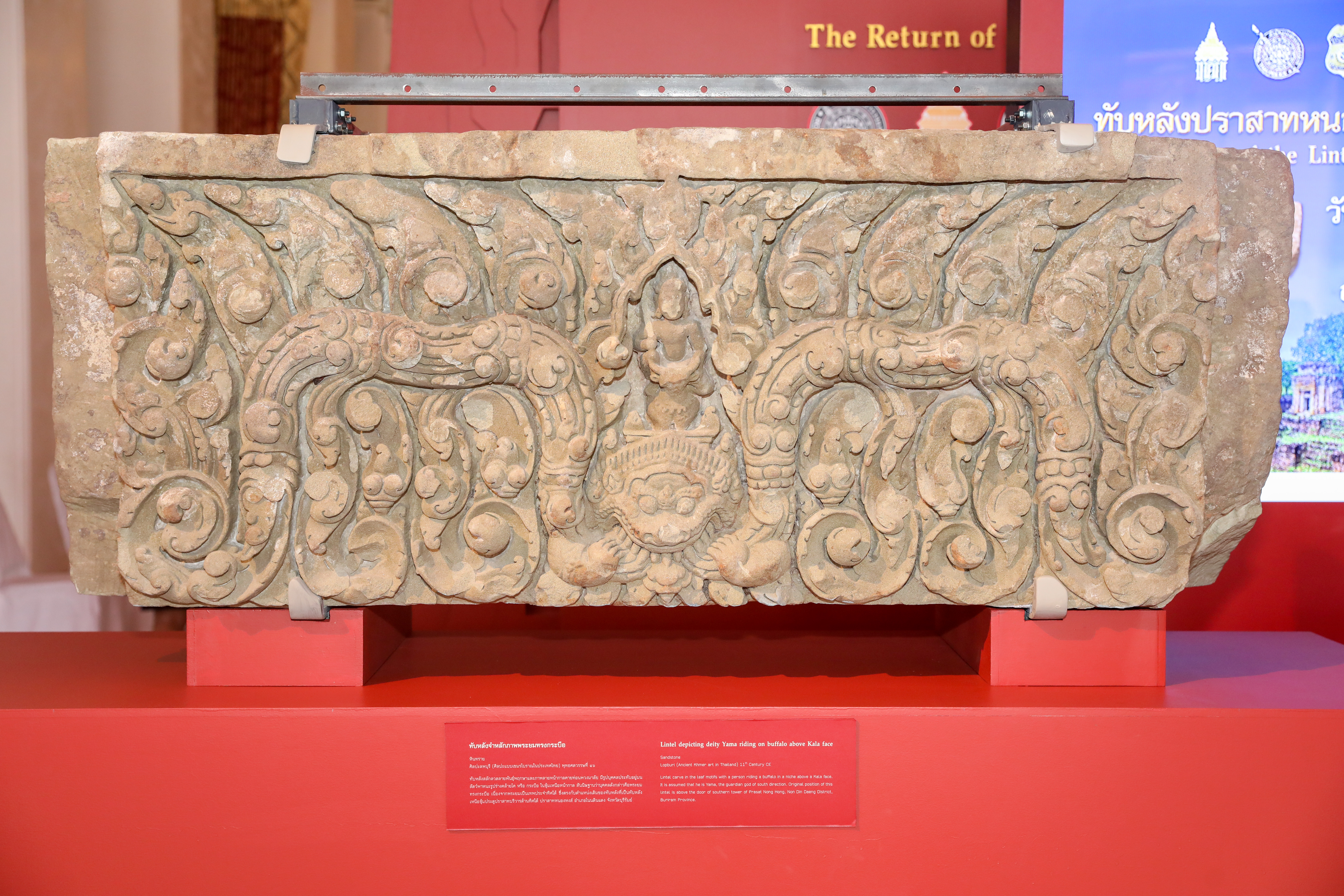
The U.S. government returns two 11th century stone lintels to Thailand, marking the end of a four-year effort on behalf of Thailand to bring these items home.

Examples of contemporary repatriation include Germany repatriating around 320,000 Bosnian refugees starting 1997, German readmission agreements with Romania and Bulgaria in 1993, expulsion of 21,000 Albanians in 1996 from Italy. Sweden and Italy applied in some cases detention prior to expulsion, which was described as deterrence. Certain countries offer financial support to refugees and immigrants to facilitate the process of starting a new life in their country of origin. Examples of 21st-century voluntary return include the Danish government, which in 2009 began offering £12,000 each to immigrants to return, Switzerland offering approximately 6,500 Francs, targeted for business startups upon returning home, as well as Ireland. In 2016, Germany allocated €150 million over three years for migrants willing to return, and the Swedish government began offering £3,500 each. 544 Nigerians returned home from Switzerland in 2013. This financial support may also be considered as residency buyouts.

Two countries may have a re-admission agreement, which establishes procedures, on a reciprocal basis, for one state to return irregular non-nationals to their country of origin or a country through which they have transited. Illegal immigrants are frequently repatriated as a matter of government policy. Repatriation measures of voluntary return, with financial assistance, as well as measures of deportation are used in many countries.

As repatriation can be voluntary or forced, the term is also used as a euphemism for deportation. Involuntary or forced repatriation is the return of refugees, prisoners of war, or civil detainees to their country of origin under circumstances that leave no other viable alternatives. According to Universal Declaration of Human Rights refugees under political persecution should be given political asylum. The forced return of people to any country where "life or freedom would be threatened" due to "race, religion, nationality, membership of a particular social group or political opinion" is against Protocol Relating to the Status of Refugees according to non-refoulement.

=== Repatriation vs. return ===
While repatriation necessarily brings an individual to their territory of origin or citizenship, a return potentially includes bringing the person back to the point of departure. This could be to a third country, including a country of transit, which is a country the person has traveled through to get to the country of destination. A return could also be within the territorial boundaries of a country, as in the case of returning internally displaced persons and demobilized combatants. The distinction between repatriation and return, voluntary or involuntary, is not always clear.

=== Medical repatriation ===
Repatriation is linked with health care due to the costs and resources associated with providing medical treatment to travelers and immigrants pursuing citizenship. For example, if a foreign national is in the United States with a visa and becomes ill, the insurance that the visa holder has in their native country may not apply in the United States, especially if it is a country with universal health care coverage. This scenario forces hospitals to choose one of three options:

- Limit their services to emergency care only (as per the Emergency Medical Treatment and Active Labor Act)
- Offer charity care free of charge or at a reduced rate
- Repatriate the patient back to their native country where he or she will be covered according to that country's policy

Determining which option is the most ethical is often very challenging for hospital administrators.

In some cases, a traveler's personal insurance company may repatriate the patient back to their home country for medical treatment due to the cost of medical expenses in the current country. The method of repatriation could be via regular flight, by ground, or by air ambulance which ever is deemed necessary subjected to the medical condition of patient and cost in mind. Medical repatriation is different from the act of medical evacuation.

=== Repatriation of foreign nationals abroad during wars ===
Countries have repatriated their nationals who are abroad during the outbreak of a war. For example when World War II begun in 1939, the United States launched a repatriation effort to repatriate Americans who were either living or visiting Europe with 75,000 Americans being repatriated by early November 1939. At the beginning of the Korean War, the United States repatriated its civilians from Korea sending them to Japan with a total of 1,655 persons being repatriated.

==== Post–World War II ====
In the 20th century, several repatriation commissions were created to supervise the return of war refugees, displaced persons, and prisoners of war to their country of origin. Repatriation hospitals were established in some countries to care for the ongoing medical and health requirements of returned military personnel.

The Allies of World War II initiated a mandatory repatriation of Soviet citizens following the Yalta Conference. These included 4.2 million Soviet prisoners of war, Ostarbeiters, and collaboratorss. While roughly 80 percent returned voluntarily, Western Allies initially used force to transfer those who resisted. Notable instances of forced transfers included the British handover of collaborationist Cossack formations in May and June 1945 and Operation Keelhaul in 1946 to 1947, which targeted remaining military collaborator.

Declassified archives disprove claims of universal, immediate persecution for the returnees. 58 percent of returnees were cleared and able to return home. Officials mobilized 33.5 percent, primarily former POWs, into the Red Army or construction battalions for forced labor, and transferred 6.5 percent to NKVD special camps. Rank-and-file military collaborators received six-year terms in special settlements, and the state prosecuted officers and civilian collaborators in positions of authority sentencing them to the Gulag. Returning civilians and former POWs faced extortion, heavy labor, and social stigma that forced many to hide their pasts.

Decolonization resulted in repatriations. After the fall of the Iron Curtain and end of Bosnian War increased repatriation, deportation and readmission agreements were observed in Europe.

=== Repatriation of mortal remains ===
In modern society where everything has become interconnected, it is not uncommon for diasporas to be found living abroad. When someone passes away overseas, a next of kin usually has to physically fly over to verify the body before the body gets repatriated back home by a funeral home.

==== Battlefield casualties ====
The Korean War marked the first time that the United States or any nation began returning the bodies of battlefield casualties as soon as possible. During Operation Glory, which followed the Korean Armistice Agreement, thousands of remains were exchanged by both sides. The practice of immediately recovering casualties continued for United States during the Vietnam War.

=== Repatriation laws ===
Repatriation laws give non-citizen foreigners who are part of the titular majority group the opportunity to immigrate and receive citizenship. Repatriation of their titular diaspora is practiced by most ethnic nation states. Repatriation laws have been created in many countries to enable diasporas to immigrate ("return") to their "kin-state". This is sometimes known as the exercise of the right of return. Repatriation laws give members of the diaspora the right to immigrate to their kin-state and they serve to maintain close ties between the state and its diaspora and gives preferential treatment to diaspora immigrants.

Most countries in central and eastern Europe as well as Armenia, Finland, France, Germany, Greece, Ireland, Israel, Italy, Japan, Kazakhstan, the Philippines, Spain, South Korea, Taiwan, and Turkey have longstanding repatriation legislation. China, Japan, Norway and Serbia also have repatriation laws for their diaspora populations. The number of countries with repatriation laws has mushroomed since the end of Soviet communism and most independent nations that were once part of the communist domain in Europe have since legislated repatriation laws. Many other countries such as Jordan and Sweden have (or have had) generous immigration policies with regard to the nation's diaspora without having formally enacted repatriation laws. Such states can be described as practicing common law repatriation.

In comparison, one of the central tenets of the Rastafari movement is the desirability of the repatriation of black people from the Americas and elsewhere back to Africa. While Ethiopia specifically has land available in Shashamane to encourage this project, black people who are citizens of countries outside Africa do not have the right of return to Africa, although as individuals they are free to try to emigrate.

=== Psychological aspects ===
Repatriation is often the "forgotten" phase of the expatriation cycle; the emphasis for support is mostly on the actual period abroad. However, many repatriates report experiencing difficulties on return: one is no longer special, practical problems arise, new knowledge gained is no longer useful, etc. These difficulties are highly influenced by a number of factors including self-management, spouse's adjustment, time spent abroad and skill utilisation. What is crucial is that every individual perceives these factors in a different way. Reintegration is a process of re-inclusion or re-incorporation of a person into a group or a process, and may contribute to overcoming repatriation.

Direct managers and HR staff often notice the difficulties a repatriate experiences, but they are not always able to act on it. Budget shortcomings and time constraints are frequently cited as reasons why it fails to be an agenda priority. Solutions for repatriation difficulties do not have to be expensive and can lead to great benefits for the company. Basic support can consist, for example, of good communication in advance, during and after the international assignment, or a mentoring program to assist the repatriate. The expatriate and their family should feel understood by their company. Support can increase job satisfaction, thereby protecting the investment made by the company.

Pope Leo XIV includes "rejected migrants" as an example of the broadly defined "poor" of the world in need of support.

== Repatriation of non-human entities ==
=== Repatriation of human remains under NAGPRA ===
Return of human remains to their nation or people of origin. In the United States, Native Americans' human remains are uncovered and removed from their burial sites in the construction/land development process or as part of archaeological excavations. The Native American Graves Protection and Repatriation Act (NAGPRA) of 1990 established the process whereby federally recognized Indian tribes and Native Hawaiian organizations can request that federal agencies and institutions receiving federal funds return culturally affiliated human remains. The NAGPRA also sets forth provisions that allow for the disposition of Native American human remains found on federal lands to the affiliated Indian tribe or Native Hawaiian organization. NAGPRA does not apply to the Smithsonian Institution, which is covered under the repatriation provisions of the National Museum of the American Indian Act (NMAI Act) of 1989.

=== International repatriation ===
International repatriation is the practice of repatriating human remains from one country to another. In previous eras, it was common for British colonial authorities to collect heads and other body parts of indigenous peoples such as Indigenous Australians and Māori for display in British museums. The repatriation of these body parts is currently ongoing. For an example of a successful body part repatriation, see Yagan. Another example can be seen through the dedicated work of the Karanga Aotearoa Repatriation Programme, established in partnership between Māori and the New Zealand government in 2003. This programme is administered by the Museum of New Zealand Te Papa Tongarewa (Te Papa), and since 2003 has repatriated over 350 Māori and Moriori ancestral remains to Aotearoa New Zealand. Article 12 of the United Nations Declaration on the Rights of Indigenous Peoples affirms that indigenous peoples have the right to repatriate their human remains. The declaration was passed in September 2007 with the support of 143 countries. The four opposing countries—Australia, New Zealand, Canada, and the United States—subsequently endorsed the declaration.

This also applies to the return of mummified human remains. An example of this kind of repatriation would be the Coffin of Nedjemankh being returned to Egypt after its illegal purchase by the Metropolitan Museum of Art.

=== Cultural artifacts ===
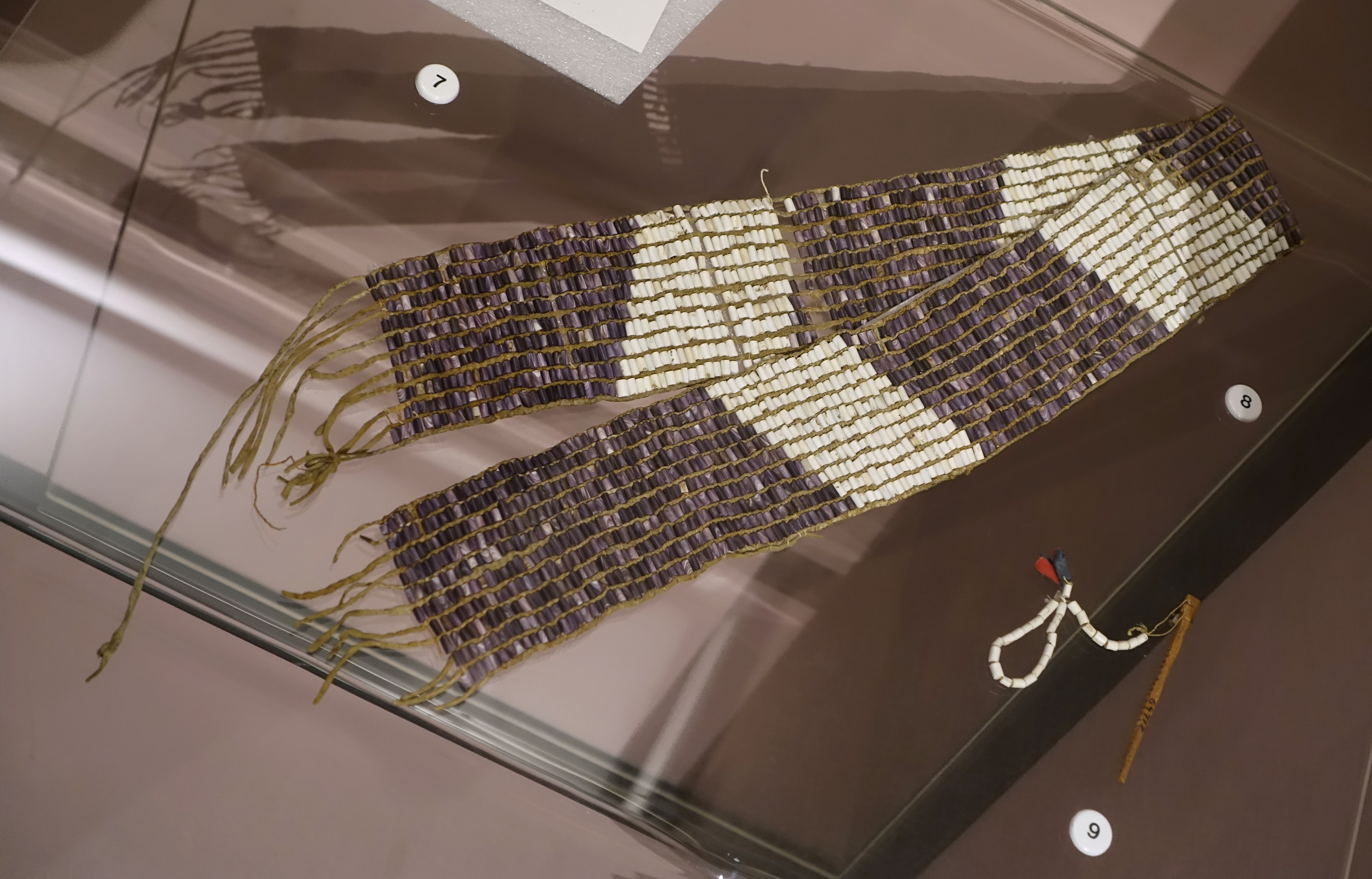
Iroquois Wampum belt that belonged to Algonquin Mohawk Chief, currently housed within the Hall of the North American Indian exhibit at the Peabody Museum of Archaeology and Ethnology at Harvard University.

Cultural or art repatriation is the return of cultural objects or works of art to their country of origin (usually referring to ancient art), or (for looted material) its former owners (or their heirs). Repatriation of cultural artifacts also includes items that fall under the purview of NAGPRA and the NMAI Act such as Native American sacred items, funerary objects, and items of cultural patrimony. The Iroquois Wampum belts are an example of objects of cultural patrimony subject to repatriation under NAGPRA. The "Utimut Process" of returning cultural objects from Denmark to Greenland between 1982 and 2001, was an early example of repatriation. The no:Bååstede project saw the transfer of over 1600 cultural objects from museums in Oslo to institutions under Sámi management between 2012 and 2019.

=== Economic repatriation ===
Economic repatriation refers to the process of a company getting its profits back into their own country. There are four main methods of repatriation: Dividends and Profits, Royalties, Management Service Fees and Intercompany Loans.

=== Repatriation of currency ===
Repatriation of currency is when foreign currency is converted back to the currency of the home country. An example would be an American converting British pounds back to U.S. dollars. Repatriation also refers to the payment of a dividend by a foreign corporation to a U.S. corporation. This happens often where the foreign corporation is considered a "controlled foreign corporation" (CFC), which means that more than 50% of the foreign corporation is owned by U.S. shareholders. Generally, foreign direct investment in CFC's are not taxed until a dividend is paid to the controlling U.S. parent company, and is thus repatriated. The foreign direct investment income of the CFC is taxed only by the country where it is incorporated until repatriation. At that time, income is subject to the (typically higher) U.S. tax rate minus the Foreign Tax Credits. (FN: See IRC 951–965) There are currently hundreds of billions of dollars of Foreign direct investment in CFC's because of the disincentive to repatriate those earnings. (See Bureau of Economic Analysis, National Economic Accounts, Integrated Macroeconomic Accounts for the United States, available at the Bureau of Economic Analysis.)

== See also ==
- Buffer Theory
- Cambodian American Repatriation
- Deportation
- European Convention on the Repatriation of Minors
- Extraordinary repatriation
- Forced migration
- Jus sanguinis
- Native American Graves Protection and Repatriation Act (NAGPRA) of 1990
- Population transfer
- Mexican Repatriation
- Repatriation in Canada
- Repatriation of Poles (1955–59)
- Repatriation of Poles (1944–1946)
- Repatriation of indentured Indians from Fiji
- Swedish extradition of Baltic soldiers
