= Jeffrey H. Cohen =

American anthropologist

Jeffrey H. Cohen (born 1962) is an American anthropologist.

== Career ==
Since the late 1980s, Cohen has worked in Oaxaca's central valleys region, specifically in the community of Santa Ana del Valle. This research is documented in his book, Cooperation and Community, published in 1999 by the University of Texas Press.

In 2004 he published the Culture of Migration, also with the University of Texas Press. This book documents a long-term study of migration in 13 villages, all located in Oaxaca's central valleys. The book argues that a "culture of migration" defines movement and frames migration as one of the many strategic moves Oaxacans participate in to organize their lives. Cohen notes the importance of domestic migration, the rise of international and transnational movers and the role that remittances play in the lives of Oaxaquenos in their home communities.

He has also worked on Dominican migration to the United States where he was part of an interdisciplinary investigation of why Dominicans are traveling to Reading, Pennsylvania. He conducts collaborative and comparative research with Ibrahim Sirkeci on Kurdish and Mexican immigration issues.

In 2007 he began an analysis of the impact of political and civil unrest in Oaxaca on migration patterns and compared Oaxacan and Chiapaneco migration patterns. He also studies food and nutrition among immigrants and the role traditional foods, such as chapulines (grasshoppers) play for Oaxacans.

He is co-editor of Migration Letters, an academic journal, as well as of the journal Remittances Review. He is also a member of the Editorial Advisory Board for the book series Research in Economic Anthropology.

== Works ==
- Cohen, Jeffrey H. (1999). Cooperation and Community: Economy and Society in Oaxaca. Austin: University of Texas Press. ISBN 0-292-71220-0. OCLC 40996161.
- Cohen, Jeffrey H.; Dannhaeuser, Norbert, eds. (2002). Economic Development: An Anthropological Approach. AltaMira Press.
- Cohen, Jeffrey H. (2004). The Culture of Migration in Southern Mexico. Austin: University of Texas Press. ISBN 0-292-70570-0. OCLC 54066190.
- Cohen, Jeffrey H.; Sirkeci, Ibrahim (2011). Cultures of Migration: The Global Nature of Contemporary Mobility. University of Texas Press.
- Cohen, Jeffrey H. (2015). Eating Soup without a Spoon: Anthropological Theory and Method in the Real World. Austin: University of Texas Press. ISBN 978-1-4773-0783-0. OCLC 922325779.
