= Human migration =

Movement of people for their benefit

Annual net migration rate for 2015–2020. Source: UN 2019

Human migration is the movement of people from one place to another, with intentions of settling, permanently or temporarily, at a new location (geographic region). The movement often occurs over long distances and from one country to another (external migration), but internal migration (within a single country) is the dominant form of human migration globally.

Migration is often associated with better human capital at both individual and household level, and with better access to migration networks, facilitating a possible second move. It has a high potential to improve human development, and some studies confirm that migration is the most direct route out of poverty. Age is also important for both work and non-work migration. People may migrate as individuals, in family units or in large groups. There are four major forms of migration: invasion, conquest, colonization and emigration/immigration.

People moving from their home due to forced displacement (such as a natural disaster or civil disturbance) may be described as displaced persons or, if remaining in the home country, internally-displaced persons. People who flee to a different country due to political, religious, or other types of persecution in their home country can formally request shelter in the host country. These people are commonly referred to as asylum seekers. If the application is approved, their legal classification changes to that of refugees.

== Definitions ==
One can subdivide migrants can be divided into three categories depending on the goals and reasons for relocation: migrants, refugees, and asylum seekers. Each category is defined broadly as the combination of circumstances that motivate people to change their location.

- Migrants are traditionally described as persons who change the country of residence for general reasons. These purposes may include better job opportunities or healthcare needs. This term is the most widely understood, as anyone changing their geographical location permanently becomes a migrant.
- In contrast, the UNHCR defines refugees as "persons forced to flee their country because of violence or persecution". The reasons for the refugees' migration usually involve war actions within the source country or other forms of oppression, coming either from government or non-governmental sources. "Refugees" are usually people who must unwillingly relocate as fast as possible; hence, such migrants may relocate without documentation.
- Asylum seekers are persons who also leave their country unwillingly, yet, who also do not do so under oppressing circumstances such as war or death-threats. The motivation to leave the country for asylum seekers might involve an unstable economic or political situation or high rates of crime. Thus, asylum seekers relocate predominantly to escape the degradation of the quality of their lives.

Differential migration involves selective migration or migration involving parts of a population group. This contrasts with the large-scale migration exemplified by various peoples in (for example) the Migration Period (German: Völkerwanderung) of late antiquity, when some entire ethnic groups shifted their residence.

Nomadic movements usually are not regarded as migrations, as such movement is generally seasonal; there is no intention to settle permanently in the new place. Only a few people have retained this form of lifestyle in modern times. Temporary movement for travel, tourism, pilgrimages, or commuting is also not regarded as migration, in the absence of an intention to live and settle in the visited places.

== Migration patterns and related numbers ==
In recent decades, migration to nearly every Western country has risen sharply. The areas of the columns show the total foreign-born population, and the slopes show the rate of increase of foreigners living in the respective countries.

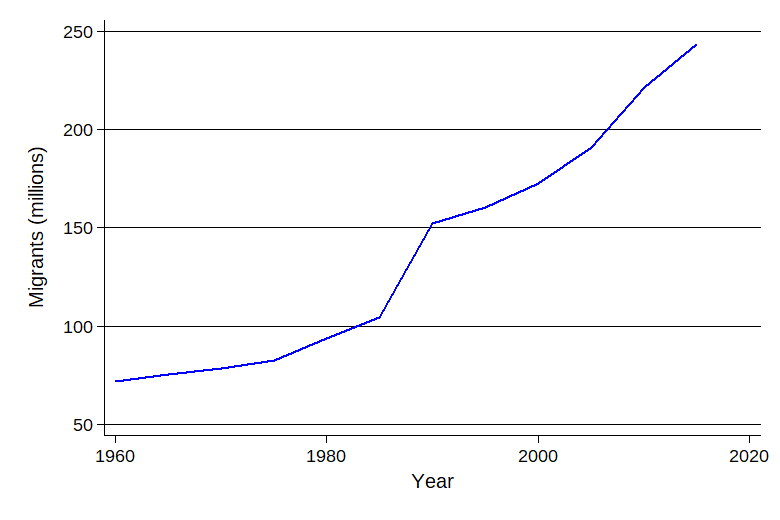
The number of migrants in the world, 1960–2015

There exist many statistical estimates of worldwide migration patterns. The World Bank has published three editions of its Migration and Remittances Factbook, beginning in 2008, with a second edition appearing in 2011 and a third in 2016. The International Organization for Migration (IOM) has published ten editions of the World Migration Report since 1999. The United Nations Statistics Division also keeps a database on worldwide migration. Recent advances in research on migration via the Internet promise better understanding of migration patterns and migration motives.

Structurally, there is substantial South–South and North–North migration; in 2013, 38% of all migrants had migrated from developing countries to other developing countries, while 23% had migrated from high-income OECD countries to other high-income countries. The United Nations Population Fund says that "while the North has experienced a higher absolute increase in the migrant stock since 2000 (32 million) compared to the South (25 million), the South recorded a higher growth rate. Between 2000 and 2013, the average annual rate of change of the migrant population in developing regions (2.3%) slightly exceeded that of the developed regions (2.1%)."

Substantial internal migration can also take place within a country, either seasonal human migration (mainly related to agriculture and tourism to urban places), or shifts of the population into cities (urbanisation) or out of cities (suburbanisation). However, studies of worldwide migration patterns tend to limit their scope to international migration.

International migrants, 1970–2015
Year	Number of migrants	Migrants as a % of the world's population
1970	84,460,125	2.3%
1975	90,368,010	2.2%
1980	101,983,149	2.3%
1985	113,206,691	2.3%
1990	152,563,212	2.9%
1995	160,801,752	2.8%
2000	172,703,309	2.8%
2005	191,269,100	2.9%
2010	221,714,243	3.2%
2015	243,700,236	3.3%
2020	280 598 105	3.6%

Almost half of these migrants are women, one of the most significant migrant-pattern changes in the last half-century. Women migrate alone or with their family members and community. Even though female migration is largely viewed as an association rather than independent migration, emerging studies argue complex and manifold reasons for this.

As of 2024, the top ten immigration destinations for international migrants were:

- United States
- Germany
- Saudi Arabia
- Russian Federation
- United Kingdom
- United Arab Emirates
- France
- Canada
- Australia
- Spain

In the same year, the top countries of origin were:

- India
- Mexico
- Russian Federation
- China
- Syrian Arab Republic
- Bangladesh
- Pakistan
- Ukraine
- Philippines
- Afghanistan

Besides these rankings, according to absolute numbers of migrants, the Migration and Remittances Factbook also gives statistics for top immigration destination countries and top emigration origin countries according to percentage of the population; the countries that appear at the top of those rankings are entirely different from the ones in the above rankings and tend to be much smaller countries.

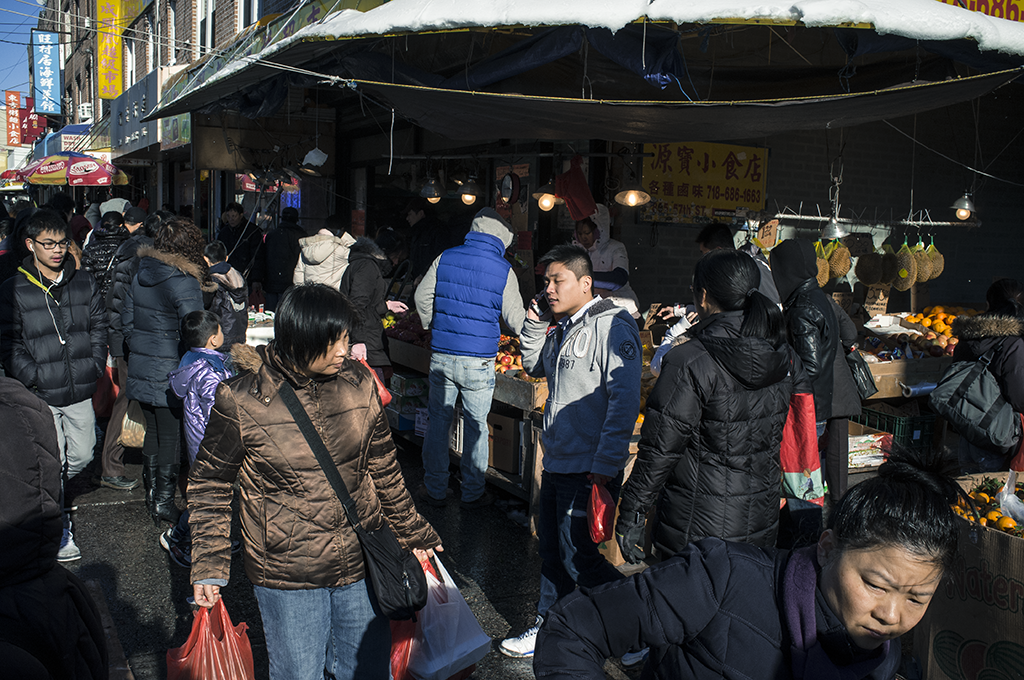
Typical grocery store on 8th Avenue in one of the Brooklyn Chinatowns on Long Island, New York.

New York City's multiple Chinatowns in Queens, Manhattan, and Brooklyn are thriving as traditionally urban enclaves, as large-scale Chinese immigration continues into New York, with the largest metropolitan Chinese population outside Asia, The New York metropolitan area contains the largest ethnic Chinese population outside of Asia, comprising an estimated 893,697 uniracial individuals as of 2017.

As of 2013, the top 15 migration corridors (accounting for at least two million migrants each) were:

1. Mexico–United States
2. Russian Federation–Ukraine
3. Bangladesh–India
4. Ukraine–Russian Federation
5. Kazakhstan–Russian Federation
6. China–United States
7. Russian Federation–Kazakhstan
8. Afghanistan–Pakistan
9. Afghanistan–Iran
10. China–Hong Kong
11. India–United Arab Emirates
12. West Bank and Gaza–Jordan
13. India–United States
14. India–Saudi Arabia
15. Philippines–United States

== Economic impacts ==
Joseph Henrich theorises that immigration can boost the relative growth of economically successful human groups.

=== World economy ===
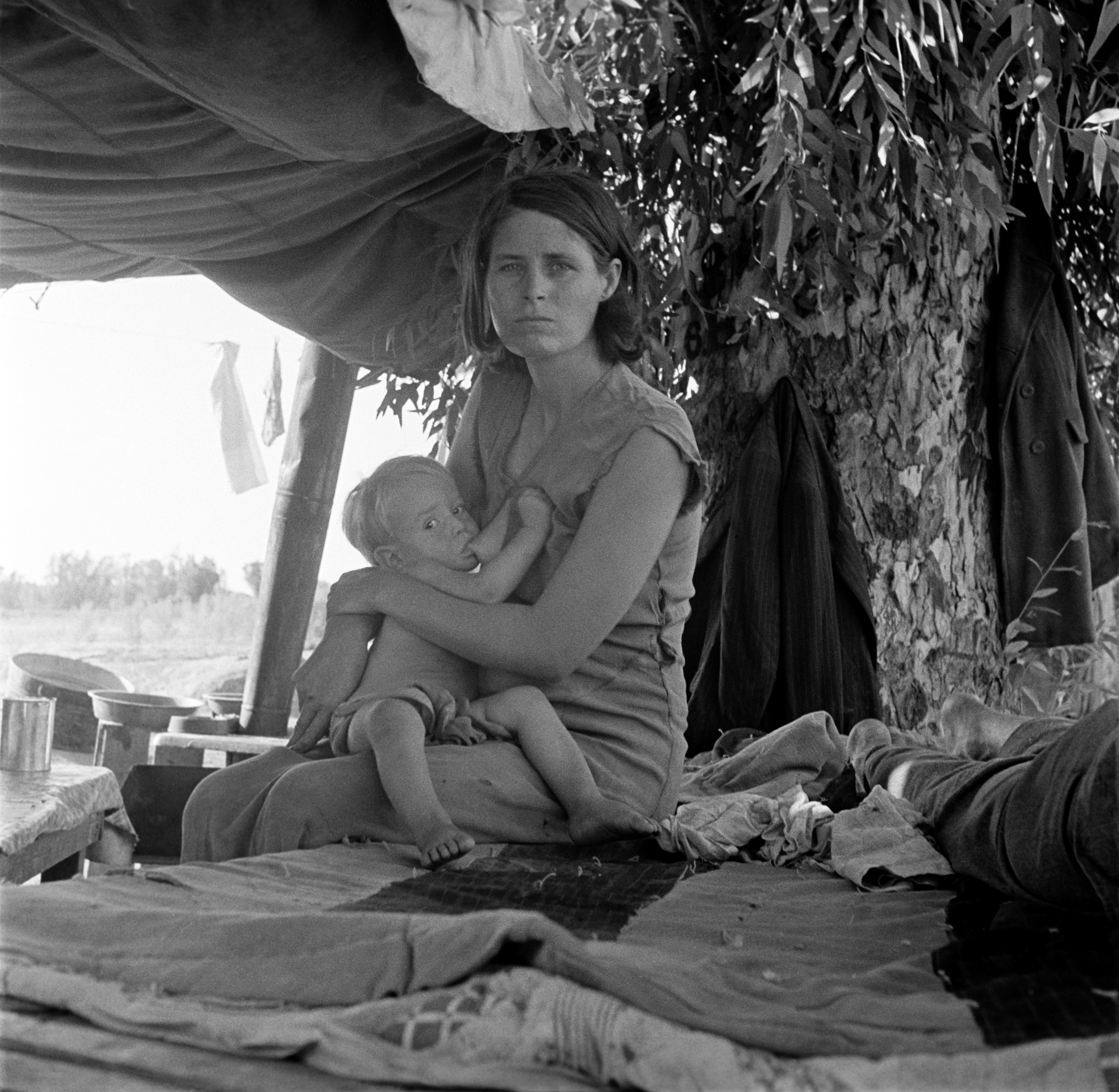
Dorothea Lange, Drought refugees from Oklahoma camping by the roadside, Blythe, California, 1936

The impacts of human migration on the world economy have been largely positive. In 2015, migrants, who constituted 3.3% of the world population, contributed 9.4% of global GDP. At a microeconomic level, firms largely recognize the value of human mobility. A 2021 survey by the Boston Consulting Group found that 72% of 850+ executives across several countries and industries believed that migration benefited their countries, and 45% considered globally-diverse employees a strategic advantage. According to the Centre for Global Development, opening all borders could add $78 trillion to the world GDP.

=== Remittances ===
Remittances (funds transferred by migrant workers to their home countries) form a substantial part of the economy of some countries. The top ten remittance recipients As of 2018:

Rank	Country	Remittance (in billions of US dollars)	Percent of GDP
1	India	80	2.80
2	China	67	0.50
3	Philippines	34	9.14
4	Mexico	34	1.54
5	France	25	0.96
6	Nigeria	22	5.84
7	Egypt	20	8.43
8	Pakistan	20	6.57
9	Bangladesh	18	5.73
10	Vietnam	14	6.35

In addition to economic impacts, migrants also make substantial contributions in sociocultural and civic-political life. Sociocultural contributions occur in the following areas of societies: food/cuisine, sport, music, art/culture, ideas and beliefs; civic-political contributions relate to participation in civic duties in the context of accepted authority of the state. In recognition of the importance of these remittances the United Nations Sustainable Development Goal 10 proposes substantially reducing the transaction costs of migrants' remittances to less than 3% by 2030.

== Voluntary and forced migration ==
Migration is usually divided into voluntary migration and forced migration. The distinction between involuntary (fleeing political conflict or natural disaster) and voluntary migration (economic or labour migration) is difficult to make and partially subjective, as the motivators for migration are often correlated. The World Bank estimated that, as of 2010, 16.3 million or 7.6% of migrants qualified as refugees. This number grew to 19.5 million by 2014 (comprising approximately 7.9% of the total number of migrants, based on the figure recorded in 2013). At levels of roughly 3 percent the share of migrants among the world population has remained remarkably constant over the last 5 decades.

=== Voluntary migration ===
Voluntary migration is based on the initiative and the free will of the person and is influenced by a combination of factors: economic, political and social: either in the migrants' country of origin (determinant factors or "push factors") or in the country of destination (attraction factors or "pull factors"). "Push-pull factors" are the reasons that push or attract people to a particular place. "Push" factors are the negative aspects(for example wars) of the country of origin, often decisive in people's choice to emigrate. The "pull" factors are the positive aspects of a different country that encourages people to emigrate to seek a better life. For example, the government of Armenia periodically gives incentives to people who will migrate to live in villages close to the border with Azerbaijan. This is an implementation of a push strategy, and the reason people do not want to live near the border is security concerns given tensions and hostility because of Azerbaijan.

Although the push-pull factors are opposed, both are sides of the same coin, being equally important. Although specific to forced migration, any other harmful factor can be considered a "push factor" or determinant/trigger factor, such examples being: poor quality of life, lack of jobs, excessive pollution, hunger, drought or natural disasters. Such conditions represent decisive reasons for voluntary migration, the population preferring to migrate in order to prevent financially unfavorable situations or even emotional and physical suffering.

=== Forced migration ===
There are contested definitions of forced migration. However, the editors of a leading scientific journal on the subject, the Forced Migration Review, offer the following definition: Forced migration refers to the movements of refugees and internally displaced people (displaced by conflict) as well as people displaced by natural or environmental disasters, chemical or nuclear disasters, famine, or development projects. These different causes of migration leave people with one choice, to move to a new environment. Immigrants leave their beloved homes to seek a life in camps, spontaneous settlement, and countries of asylum.

By the end of 2018, there were an estimated 67.2 million forced migrants globally – 25.9 million refugees displaced from their countries, and 41.3 million internally displaced persons that had been displaced within their countries for different reasons. In 2022, 6 million Ukrainian people fled their country; meanwhile, 3 million Syrian people fled in 3 years.

=== Rejected migrants ===
Where migrants' entry or continued residence within their intended host country is refused, they are liable to be returned or repatriated, usually against their will.

== Transit migration ==
Transit migration is a highly debated term with no official definition. The common understanding is that it describes immigrants who are in the process of moving to an end goal country. The term was coined by the UN in 1990 to describe immigrants who were traveling through countries surrounding Europe to end up in a European Union state. Another example of transit migrants is Central Americans who travel through Mexico in order to live in the United States.

The term "transit migration" has generated a lot of debate among migration scholars and immigration institutions. Some criticize it as a Eurocentric term that was coined to place responsibility of migrants on states outside the European Union; and also to pressure those states to prevent migration onward to the European Union. Scholars note that EU countries also have identical migrant flows and therefore it is not clear (illogical or biased) why it is only migrants in non-EU countries that are labeled as transit migrants. It is also argued that the term "transit" glosses over the complexity and difficulty of migrant journeys: migrants face many types of violence while in transit; migrants often have no set end destination and must adjust their plan as they move (migrant journeys can take years and go through several stages).

In November 2025, more than a dozen NGO rescue ships operating in the Mediterranean suspended all communication with the Libyan coast guard, citing an escalation in violent interceptions of asylum seekers at sea and their transfer to camps where torture, rape, and forced labor are rampant. The 13 search and rescue organizations described their decision as a rejection of the increasing pressure exerted by the EU.

== Contemporary labor migration theories ==
=== Overview ===
Numerous causes impel migrants to move to another country. For instance, globalization has increased the demand for workers in order to sustain national economies. Thus one category of economic migrants – generally from impoverished developing countries – migrates to obtain sufficient income for survival. Such migrants often send some of their income homes to family members in the form of economic remittances, which have become an economic staple in a number of developing countries. People may also move or are forced to move as a result of conflict, of human-rights violations, of violence, or to escape persecution. In 2014, the UN Refugee agency estimated that around 59.5 million people fell into this category. Other reasons people may move include to gain access to opportunities and services or to escape extreme weather. This type of movement, usually from rural to urban areas, may be classed as internal migration. Sociology-cultural and ego-historical factors also play a major role. In North Africa, for example, emigrating to Europe counts as a sign of social prestige. Moreover, many countries were former colonies. This means that many have relatives who live legally in the (former) colonial metro pole and who often provide important help for immigrants arriving in that metropole.

Relatives may help with job research and with accommodation. The geographical proximity of Africa to Europe and the long historical ties between Northern and Southern Mediterranean countries also prompt many to migrate. Whether a person decides to move to another country depends on the relative skill premier of the source and host countries. One is speaking of positive selection when the host country shows a higher skill premium than the source country. On the other hand, negative selection occurs when the source country displays a lower skill premium. The relative skill premia define migrants selectivity. Age heaping techniques display one method to measure the relative skill premium of a country. A number of theories attempt to explain the international flow of capital and people from one country to another.

=== Research contributions ===
Recent academic output on migration comprises mainly journal articles. The long-term trend shows a gradual increase in academic publishing on migration, which is likely to be related to the general expansion of academic literature production, and the increased prominence of migration research. Migration and its research have further changed with the revolution in information and communication technologies.

=== Neoclassical economic theory ===
This migration theory states that the main reason for labour migration is wage difference between two geographic locations. These wage differences are usually linked to geographic labour demand and supply. It can be said that areas with a shortage of labour but an excess of capital have a high relative wage while areas with a high labour supply and a dearth of capital have a low relative wage. Labour tends to flow from low-wage areas to high-wage areas. Often, with this flow of labour comes changes in the sending and the receiving country. Neoclassical economic theory best describes transnational migration because it is not confined by international immigration laws and similar governmental regulations.

=== Dual labor market theory ===
Dual labour market theory states that pull factors in more developed countries mainly cause migration. This theory assumes that the labour markets in these developed countries consist of two segments: the primary market, which requires high-skilled labour, and the secondary market, which is very labour-intensive, requiring low-skilled workers. This theory assumes that migration from less developed countries into more developed countries results from a pull created by a need for labour in the developed countries in their secondary market. Migrant workers are needed to fill the lowest rung of the labour market because the native labourers do not want to do these jobs as they present a lack of mobility. This creates a need for migrant workers. Furthermore, the initial dearth in available labour pushes wages up, making migration even more enticing.

=== New economics of labor migration ===
This theory states that migration flows and patterns cannot be explained solely at the level of individual workers and their economic incentives but that wider social entities must also be considered. One such social entity is the household. Migration can be viewed as a result of risk aversion from a household that has insufficient income. In this case, the household needs extra capital that can be achieved through remittances sent back by family members who participate in migrant labour abroad. These remittances can also have a broader effect on the economy of the sending country as a whole as they bring in capital. Recent research has examined a decline in US interstate migration from 1991 to 2011, theorising that the reduced interstate migration is due to a decline in the geographic specificity of occupations and an increase in workers' ability to learn about other locations before moving there, through both information technology and inexpensive travel. Other researchers find that the location-specific nature of housing is more important than moving costs in determining labour reallocation.

=== Relative deprivation theory ===
Relative deprivation theory states that awareness of the income difference between neighbours or other households in the migrant-sending community is essential in migration. The incentive to migrate is a lot higher in areas with a high level of economic inequality. In the short run, remittances may increase inequality, but in the long run, they may decrease it. There are two stages of migration for workers: first, they invest in human capital formation, and then they try to capitalise on their investments. In this way, successful migrants may use their new capital to provide better schooling for their children and better homes for their families. Successful high-skilled emigrants may serve as an example for neighbours and potential migrants who hope to achieve that level of success.

=== World systems theory ===
World-systems theory looks at migration from a global perspective. It explains that interaction between different societies can be an important factor in social change. Trade with one country, which causes an economic decline in another, may create incentive to migrate to a country with a more vibrant economy. It can be argued that even after decolonisation, the economic dependence of former colonies remains on mother countries. However, this view of international trade is controversial, and some argue that free trade can reduce migration between developing and developed countries. It can be argued that the developed countries import labour-intensive goods, which causes an increase in the employment of unskilled workers in the less developed countries, decreasing the outflow of migrant workers. Exporting capital-intensive goods from rich countries to developing countries also equalises income and employment conditions, thus slowing migration. In either direction, this theory can be used to explain migration between countries that are geographically far apart.

=== Osmosis theory ===
Based on the history of human migration osmosis theory studies the evolution of its natural determinants. In this theory migration is divided into two main types: simple and complicated. The simple migration is divided, in its turn, into diffusion, stabilisation and concentration periods. During these periods, water availability, adequate climate, security and population density represent the natural determinants of human migration. The complicated migration is characterised by the speedy evolution and the emergence of new sub-determinants, notably earning, unemployment, networks, and migration policies. Osmosis theory explains analogically human migration by the biophysical phenomenon of osmosis. In this respect, the countries are represented by animal cells, the borders by the semipermeable membranes and the humans by ions of water. According to the theory, according to the osmosis phenomenon, humans migrate from countries with less migration pressure to countries with high migration pressure. To measure the latter, the natural determinants of human migration replace the variables of the second principle of thermodynamics used to measure the osmotic pressure.

== Social-scientific theories ==
=== Sociology ===
A number of social scientists have examined immigration from a sociological perspective, paying particular attention to how immigration affects and is affected by, matters of race and ethnicity, as well as social structure. They have produced three main sociological perspectives:

- symbolic interactionism, which aims to understand migration via face-to-face interactions on a micro-level
- social conflict theory, which examines migration through the prism of competition for power and resources
- structural functionalism (based on the ideas of Émile Durkheim), which examines the role of migration in fulfilling certain functions within each society, such as the decrease of despair and aimlessness and the consolidation of social networks

In the 21st century, as attention has shifted away from countries of destination, sociologists have attempted to understand how transnationalism allows us to understand the interplay between migrants, their countries of destination, and their countries of origins. In this framework, work on social remittances by Peggy Levitt and others has led to a stronger conceptualisation of how migrants affect socio-political processes in their countries of origin. Much work also takes place in the field of integration of migrants into destination-societies.

=== Political science ===
Political scientists have put forth a number of theoretical frameworks relating to migration, offering different perspectives on processes of security, citizenship, and international relations.The political importance of diasporas has also become in the 21st century a growing field of interest, as scholars examine questions of diaspora activism, state-diaspora relations, out-of-country voting processes, and states' soft power strategies. In this field, the majority of work has focused on immigration politics, viewing migration from the perspective of the country of destination. With regard to emigration processes, political scientists have expanded on Albert Hirschman's framework on '"voice" vs. "exit" to discuss how emigration affects the politics within countries of origin.

== Historical theories ==
=== Ravenstein ===
Certain laws of social science have been proposed to describe human migration. The following was a standard list after Ernst Georg Ravenstein's proposal in the 1880s:

1. every migration flow generates a return or counter migration.
2. the majority of migrants move a short distance.
3. migrants who move longer distances tend to choose big-city destinations.
4. urban residents are often less migratory than inhabitants of rural areas.
5. families are less likely to make international moves than young adults.
6. most migrants are adults.
7. large towns grow by migration rather than natural increase.
8. migration stage by stage (step migration).
9. urban, rural difference.
10. migration and technology.
11. economic condition.

=== Push and pull ===
Demographer Everett S. Lee's model divides factors causing migrations into two groups of factors: push and pull. Push factors are things that are unfavourable about the home area that one lives in, and pull factors are things that attract one to another host area.

Push factors:

- Not enough jobs
- Few opportunities
- Conscription (draft young men into army)
- Famine or drought
- Political fear of persecution
- Poor medical care
- Loss of wealth
- Natural disasters
- Death threats
- Desire for more political or religious freedom
- Pollution
- Poor housing
- Discrimination
- Poor chances of marrying
- War or threat of invasion
- Disease

Pull factors:

- Job opportunities
- Better living conditions
- The feeling of having more political or religious freedom
- Enjoyment
- Education
- Better medical care
- Attractive climates
- Security
- Family links
- Industry
- Better chances of marrying

=== Climate cycles ===
The modern field of climate history suggests that the successive waves of Eurasian nomadic movement throughout history have had their origins in climatic cycles, which have expanded or contracted pastureland in Central Asia, especially Mongolia and to its west the Altai Mountains. People were displaced from their home ground by other tribes trying to find land that essential flocks could graze, each group pushing the next further to the south and west, into the highlands of Anatolia, the Pannonian Plain, into Mesopotamia, or southwards, into the rich pastures of China. Bogumil Terminski uses the term "migratory domino effect" to describe this process in the context of Sea People invasion.

=== Food, sex, and security ===
The theory is that migration occurs because individuals search for food, sex and security outside their usual habitation; Idyorough (2008) believes that towns and cities are a creation of the human struggle to obtain food, sex and security. To produce food, security and reproduction, human beings must, out of necessity, move out of their usual habitation and enter into indispensable social relationships that are cooperative or antagonistic.

Human beings also develop the tools and equipment to interact with nature to produce the desired food and security. The improved relationship (cooperative relationships) among human beings and improved technology further conditioned by the push and pull factors all interact together to cause or bring about migration and higher concentration of individuals into towns and cities. The higher the technology of production of food and security and the higher the cooperative relationship among human beings in the production of food and security and the reproduction of the human species, the higher would be the push and pull factors in the migration and concentration of human beings in towns and cities. Countryside, towns and cities do not just exist, but they do so to meet the basic human needs of food, security and the reproduction of the human species. Therefore, migration occurs because individuals search for food, sex and security outside their usual habitation. Social services in the towns and cities are provided to meet these basic needs for human survival and pleasure.

=== Other models ===
- Zipf's inverse distance law (1956)
- Gravity model of migration and the friction of distance
- Radiation law for human mobility
- Buffer theory
- Stouffer's theory of intervening opportunities (1940)
- Zelinsky's Mobility Transition Model (1971)
- Bauder's regulation of labour markets (2006): "suggests that the international migration of workers is necessary for the survival of industrialised economies...[It] turns the conventional view of international migration on its head: it investigates how migration regulates labour markets, rather than labour markets shaping migration flows."

== Migration governance ==
By their very nature, international migration and displacement are transnational issues concerning the origin and destination States and States through which migrants may travel (often referred to as "transit" States) or in which they are hosted following displacement across national borders. And yet, somewhat paradoxically, the majority of migration governance has historically remained with individual states.

Their policies and regulations on migration are typically made at the national level. For the most part, migration governance has been closely associated with State sovereignty. States retain the power of deciding on the entry and stay of non-nationals because migration directly affects some of the defining elements of a State. Comparative surveys reveal varying degrees of openness to migrants across countries, considering policies such as visa availability, employment prerequisites, and paths to residency.

Bilateral and multilateral arrangements are features of migration governance at an international level. There are several global arrangements in the form of international treaties in which States have reached an agreement on the application of human rights and the related responsibilities of States in specific areas. The 1966 International Covenant on Civil and Political Rights and the 1951 Convention Relating to the Status of Refugees (Refugee Convention) are two significant examples notable for being widely ratified. Other migration conventions have not been so broadly accepted, such as the International Convention on the Protection of the Rights of All Migrant Workers and Members of Their Families, which still has no traditional countries of destination among its States parties. Beyond this, there have been numerous multilateral and global initiatives, dialogues and processes on migration over several decades.

The Global Compact for Safe, Orderly and Regular Migration (Global Compact for Migration) is another milestone, as the first internationally negotiated statement of objectives for migration governance striking a balance between migrants' rights and the principle of States' sovereignty over their territory. Although it is not legally binding, the Global Compact for Migration was adopted by consensus in December 2018 at a United Nations conference in which more than 150 United Nations Member States participated and, later that same month, in the United Nations General Assembly (UNGA), by a vote among the Member States of 152 to 5 (with 12 abstentions).

=== Migration programs ===
Colonialism and colonization opens up distant territories and their people to migration, having dominated what is identified as modern migration. Colonialism globalized systems of migration and established ties effective until today.

While classic modern colonialism relied on the subjugation and rule of local indigenous peoples by small groups of conquering metropolitan people, soon forced migration, through slavery or indentured servitude supplanted the subjugated local indigenous peoples. Settler colonialism later continued or established the rule of the colonizers through migration, particularly settlement. Settler colonies relied on the attraction of metropolitan migrants with the promise of settlement and increasingly outnumbering, displacing or killing indigenous peoples.

Only in the late stage of colonialism migration flows oriented towards the metropole instead of out or outside of it. After decolonization migration ties between former colonies to former metropoles have been continuing. Today's independent countries have developed selective or targeted foreign worker policies or programs, with the aim of boosting economies with skilled or relatively cheap new local labour, while discrimination and exploitation are often fed by ethnic nationalist opposition to such policies.

== See also ==
- Immigration lawyer
- Demographics of the world
- Early human migrations
- El Inmigrante – 2005 film
- Environmental migrant
- Existential migration
- Expatriate
- Feminisation of migration
- Genographic Project
- Human Capital Flight
- Humanitarian crisis
- International migration
- Illegal immigration
- Linguistic Diversity in Space and Time
- Immigration to Europe
- List of diasporas
  - Jewish diaspora
- Migrant literature
- Migration in China
- Most recent common ancestor
- Offshoring
- Political demography
- Queer migration
- Refugee roulette
- Religion and human migration
- Replacement migration
- Return migration
- Separation barrier
- Snowbird (person)
- Space colonization
- Timeline of maritime migration and exploration
- Cultural bereavement

== Sources and further reading ==
- Anderson, Vivienne. and Johnson, Henry. (eds) Migration, Education and Translation: Cross-Disciplinary Perspectives on Human Mobility and Cultural Encounters in Education Settings. New York: Routledge, 2020.
- Behdad, Ali. A Forgetful Nation: On Immigration and Cultural Density in the United States, Duke UP, 2005.
- Brettell, Caroline B.; Hollifield, James F. Migration Theory (Routledge, 2000) [Migration Theory online]
- Chaichian, Mohammad. Empires and Walls: Globalisation, Migration, and Colonial Control, Leiden: Brill, 2014.
- Jared Diamond, Guns, germs and steel. A short history of everybody for the last 13'000 years, 1997.
- De La Torre, Miguel A., Trails of Terror: Testimonies on the Current Immigration Debate, Orbis Books, 2009.
- Fell, Peter and Hayes, Debra. What are they doing here? A critical guide to asylum and immigration, Birmingham (UK): Venture Press, 2007.
- Hanlon, Bernadette and Vicino, Thomas J. Global Migration: The Basics, New York and London: Routledge, 2014.
- de Haas, Hein. How Migration Really Works, Penguin, 2023.
- Harzig, Christiane, and Dirk Hoerder. What is migration history? (John Wiley & Sons, 2013) online.
- Hoerder, Dirk. Cultures in Contact. World Migrations in the Second Millennium, Duke University Press, 2002.
- Idyorough, Alamveabee E. "Sociological Analysis of Social Change in Contemporary Africa", Makurdi: Aboki Publishers, 2015.
- IOM World Migration Report, see World Migration Report International Organization for Migration
- Kleiner-Liebau, Désirée. Migration and the Construction of National Identity in Spain, Madrid / Frankfurt, Iberoamericana / Vervuert, Ediciones de Iberoamericana, 2009. ISBN 978-8484894766.
- Knörr, Jacqueline. Women and Migration. Anthropological Perspectives, Frankfurt & New York: Campus Verlag & St. Martin's Press, 2000.
- Knörr, Jacqueline. Childhood and Migration. From Experience to Agency, Bielefeld: Transcript, 2005.
- Manning, Patrick. Migration in World History, New York and London: Routledge, 2005.
- Miller, Mark & Castles, Stephen (1993). The Age of Migration: International Population Movements in the Modern World. Guilford Press.
- Migration for Employment, Paris: OECD Publications, 2004.
- OECD International Migration Outlook 2007, Paris: OECD Publications, 2007.
- Pécoud, Antoine and Paul de Guchteneire (Eds): Migration without Borders, Essays on the Free Movements of People (Berghahn Books, 2007).
- Purohit, A. K. (ed.) The Philosophy of Evolution, Yash Publishing House, Bikaner, 2010. ISBN 8186882359.
- Rubel, Alexander (2024a). Migration in der Antike. Von der Odyssee bis Mohammed [Migration in Antiquity. From the Odyssey to Muhammad]. Freiburg: wbg Academic, ISBN 978-3-534-61013-6.
- Rubel, Alexander (2024b). Migration. Eine Kulturgeschichte der Menschheit [Migration. A cultural history of mankind]. Stuttgart: Kohlhammer, ISBN 978-3-17-044528-4.
- Abdelmalek Sayad. The Suffering of the Immigrant, Preface by Pierre Bourdieu, Polity Press, 2004.
- Reich, David (2018). Who We Are And How We Got Here – Ancient DNA and the New Science of the Human Past. Pantheon Books. ISBN 978-1-101-87032-7.
  - Diamond, Jared (20 April 2018). "A Brand-New Version of Our Origin Story". The New York Times.
- Stalker, Peter. No-Nonsense Guide to International Migration, New Internationalist, 2nd ed., 2008.
- White, Micheal (Ed.) (2016). International Handbook of Migration and Population Distribution. Springer.

=== Journals ===
- International Migration Review
- Migration Letters
- International Migration ISSN 1468-2435
- Journal of Ethnic and Migration Studies
- Review of Economics of the Household
