= Migrant literature =

Migrant literature, sometimes written by migrants themselves, tells stories of immigration.

== Settings ==
Although any experience of migration would qualify an author to be classed under migrant literature, the main focus of recent research has been on the principal channels of mass-migration in the twentieth century. These include: European migration to North America or Australia; Arab migration to America after the collapse of the Ottoman empire; African and Asian migration from former colonies into Europe; situations of ethnic cleansing; guest worker programs; and exile situations such as that of German dissidents during the Nazi period.

Migrant literature and postcolonial literature show some considerable overlap.

== Themes ==
Migrant literature focuses on the social contexts in the migrants' country of origin which prompt them to leave, on the experience of migration itself, on the mixed reception which they may receive in the country of arrival, on experiences of racism and hostility, and on the sense of rootlessness and the search for identity which can result from displacement and cultural diversity.

== Relationship to post-colonial literature ==
Colonialism often creates a setting which results in the migration of large numbers of people, either within the colonies or from them to the "imperial centre" (Britain, Turkey, France, Japan, Italy, etc.). However, not all migration takes place in a colonial setting, and not all postcolonial literature deals with migration. A question of current debate is the extent to which postcolonial theory also speaks to migration literature of non-colonial settings. The presence in central Europe of Gastarbeiter communities, for example, is not a result of colonialism.

== Categories ==
A number of categories have been developed for discussing migrant literature. Some of these are the standard categories of post-colonial theory, while others have been worked out precisely to cope with non-colonial settings.

=== Displacement ===
Displacement is a key term in post-colonial theory which applies to all migrant situations. It refers both to physical displacement and a sense of being socially or culturally "out of place".

=== Renaissance ===
As worded by David Levinson and Melvin Ember, "the drive to sustain some Arab cultural identity among the immigrant communities in North America" was reinforced from the beginning when educated immigrants launched Arabic-language newspapers and literary societies in both the New York and Boston areas to encourage poetry and writing, with the aim of keeping alive and enriching the Arabic cultural heritage." The Mahjar was started by Arabic-speaking writers who had emigrated to the Americas from Ottoman-ruled Lebanon, Syria and Palestine at the turn of the 20th century. Writing in 1942, Pietro Sfair wrote about "Emigration and Love of Country in the Poetry of the Lebanese Dialect." Writers of the Mahjar movement were stimulated by their personal encounter with the Western world and participated in the renewal of Arabic literature. Lebanese-American writer Kahlil Gibran is considered to have been the most influential of the "Mahjari poets".

=== Guest and host communities ===
Picking up on the term Gastarbeiter and using it affirmatively, Rafik Schami and Franco Biondi used the terminology of guest and host to express some of the dynamics of migrant situations. The term describes the frustrations from many migrant authors about the lack of acceptance, poor working conditions, racism and difficulties with integration.

=== Emigrant versus immigrant perspectives ===
It is possible to distinguish the "emigrant perspective" of the migrant whose main focus is backwards to the country of origin from the "immigrant perspective" of the migrant who is reconciled with the prospect of permanent residence in the country of arrival.

=== Primary and secondary migration ===
In relation to work migration, it is common for one member of a family, typically the father, to travel in search of work, the rest of the family following later. In the context of migration and family ties, "secondary migration" refers to the emigration of relatives to join the primary migrant.

=== First and second generation migrants ===
First generation migrants are those who, as adults, themselves made the move from one country to another. Second generation migrants are the children of migrants, who were either very young at the time of migration or were born in the country of arrival. The perspectives across generations can differ enormously.

=== Between cultures ===
In literature of second generation migrants, a location "between" two cultures, sometimes called an "interstitial" space, is often mentioned as a way of expressing a sense of belonging in neither the guest nor the host community. Those whose experience has been more positive may reject the notion of "between" and feel that they live, rather, in the cultural overlap, not a void but a place of relatable richness.

=== Hybridity ===
Hybridity in post-colonial theory refers to the migrant's culturally mixed identity as the contrasting force of assimilation and the search for roots forces a middle way.

=== Bilingual theory ===
Bilingualism is an essential component of hybridity. Results of socio-linguistic research are therefore of importance to work on migrant literature.

== See also ==
- Creolization
- Migration Letters
- Return migration
