= World Migration Report =

World Migration Report 2026
- Author: International Organization for Migration
- Language: English, Spanish, French, Chinese, Arabic, and Russian
- Published: Published biannually since 2000
- No. of books: 13
- Website: https://worldmigrationreport.iom.int/

The flagship publication series of the International Organization for Migration, the World Migration Report presents data and information on human migration together with analysis of complex and emerging migration issues.

Released biennially, the World Migration Report 2026 is the thirteenth edition in the series.

== History ==
The World Migration Report was first published by IOM in 2000 with the aim of promoting "a better understanding of the main migratory movements that are occurring across the globe." The first edition sought to achieve this aim by providing "an authoritative account of contemporary trends, issues, and problems in the field of international migration," presenting together a "review of trends in international migration in each major region of the world" with "a discussion of some of the main migration policy issues facing the international community."

The subsequent seven editions, published between 2003 and 2015, were published with specific thematic interests. The 2018 edition of the World Migration Report, the first published by IOM as the United Nations Migration Agency, restructured the report into two parts. The first part provides "key information on migration and migrants" through an exploration of the statistical data available on migration. The second part features several chapters that each provide a "balanced, evidence-based analysis of complex and emerging migration issues."

== Editions ==
=== World Migration Report 2026 ===
The World Migration Report 2026, the thirteenth in the series, follows the same structure as previous editions, and has been produced to contribute to increased of migration and mobility globally. The first part of the report consists of three chapters, which presents key data and information on migration at the global and regional levels, while the second part includes thematic chapters on highly topical migration issue:

- Migration and development: a strategic global asset at risk
- Rethinking regular migration pathways: myths, realities and opportunities
- Addressing climate mobility: the role of local and community action
- Internal displacement: trends, responses and solutions
- Disability and migration: trends, issues and responses

=== World Migration Report 2024 ===
The World Migration Report 2024, the twelfth in the series, maintains the same structure as earlier editions, and has been produced "to contribute to increased understanding of migration and mobility throughout the world.

The first part of the report consists of three chapters, which presents key data and information on migration at the global and regional levels, while the second part includes thematic chapters on highly topical migration issue:

- Growing migration inequality: What do the global data actually show?
- Migration and human security: Unpacking myths and examining new realities and responses
- Migration as a stepladder for opportunity
- Gender and migration: Trends, gaps and urgent action
- Climate change, food insecurity and human mobility: Interlinkages, evidence and action
- Towards a global governance of migration? From the 2005 Global Commission on International Migration to the 2022 International Migration Review Forum and beyond
- A post-pandemic rebound? Migration and mobility globally after COVID-19

=== World Migration Report 2022 ===
The World Migration Report 2022, the eleventh in the series, retains the same structure as its predecessors, and has the aim "to set out in clear and accurate terms the changes occurring in migration and mobility globally." The first part of the report consists of four chapters, which provide updated migration statistics at the global and regional levels, while the second part considers the following thematic migration issues different to those in previous reports:

- COVID-19's impact on migration and mobility
- Peace, security and migration
- Migration as a stepladder for opportunity
- Disinformation about migration
- Migration and the slow-onset impacts of climate change
- Human trafficking in migration pathways
- Artificial intelligence, migration and mobility
- Migrants' contributions to societies

=== World Migration Report 2020 ===
The World Migration Report 2020, the tenth in the series, similarly has the aim of contributing to increased understanding of migration throughout the world. The first four chapters are the same as in the 2018 edition, which provide updated migration statistics at the global and regional levels, while the second part considers a range of different migration issues:

- Migrants' contributions to societies
- Migration, inclusion and social cohesion
- Migration and health
- Children and unsafe migration
- Migration and adaptation to environmental change
- Migrants caught in crises
- Recent developments in global migration governance

=== World Migration Report 2018 ===
Unlike the seven preceding reports which centered around a specific theme, the World Migration Report 2018 seeks to provide "both overview information that helps to explain migration patterns and processes, as well as insights and recommendations on major issues that policymakers are or will soon be grappling with".

The first part of the report consists of four chapters produced institutionally by IOM. It draws primarily upon analyses by IOM experts, practitioners and officials around the world, and compiles a wealth of data, information, and analysis with the aim of increasing the understanding of migration at both the global and regional levels. Conversely, the second part is authored by applied and academic researchers working on migration and mobility, and presents balanced, evidence-based analyses of complex and emerging migration issues. Specifically, the second section comprises the following chapters:

- Global migration governance frameworks: Existing architecture and recent developments
- Mobility, migration and transnational connectivity
- Understanding migration journeys from migrants' perspectives
- Media reporting of migrants and migration
- Migration, violent extremism and social exclusion
- Migrants and cities: Stepping beyond World Migration Report 2015

=== Thematic editions ===
The seven editions of the World Migration Report released between 2003 and 2015 are organised around a core theme:

- World Migration Report 2015: Migrants and Cities, New Partnerships to Manage Mobility.
- World Migration Report 2013: High-level Dialogue on International Migration and Development.
- World Migration Report 2011: Communicating Effectively about Migration.
- World Migration Report 2010: The Future of Migration: Building Capacities for Change.
- World Migration Report 2008: Managing Labour Mobility in the Evolving Global Economy.
- World Migration Report 2005: Costs and Benefits of International Migration.
- World Migration Report 2003: Challenges and Responses for People on the Move.

=== World Migration Report 2000 ===
Like the most recent editions of the World Migration Report, the 2000 edition is divided into two parts.

The first examines the scale of migration and characteristics of international migrants, including: the types of movements underway; the factors which contribute to migration; and the policy issues associated with these trends. In nine separate chapters, the second part reviews migration trends and recent policy developments in the major migration regions of the world. Alongside this discussion is an analysis of the integration of migrants, the consequences of irregular migration, and the extent of interregional cooperation between states.

== Uses of the report ==
=== World Migration Report 2026 ===
The World Migration Report 2024 has been referenced in several media outlets, including InfoMigrants, DownToEarth, Morocco World News, the Times of India, among others.

=== World Migration Report 2024 ===
The World Migration Report 2024 has been referenced in several media outlets, including CNN, the Guardian, Euronews, Inter Press Service, El Universal, the Times of India, among others.

As previous editions, the World Migration Report 2024 has been cited by several journals, including the International Journal of Environmental Research and Public Health, the Journal of Ethnic and Migration Studies and the Environmental Science & Policy.

=== World Migration Report 2022 ===
The World Migration Report 2022 has been mentioned it in several media outlets across the world such as the East African, France 24, La Nación, Associated Press (AP), the Independent, among others.

The report has been cited in prestigious journals, including the Journal of Asian and African Studies, the International Journal of Disaster Risk Reduction, the Comparative Migration Studies Journal and the Cambridge University Press, among others.

This edition was also used in publications issued by international organizations, such as the World Bank, the World Health Organization, the World Economic Forum, and by think tanks such as the Migration Policy Institute, the Center for American Progress, and the Mixed Migration Centre, among others.

=== World Migration Report 2020 ===
Media outlets such as CNN Español, the World Economic Forum and Reuters have published articles that utilize the World Migration Report 2020 as a resource to discuss contemporary migration trends.

The academia has also used the 2020 report in articles published by Oxford University Press, the IZA Institute of Labor Economics, the Journal of Ethnic and Migration Studies, the International Migration Review, to mention a couple of examples.

Several international organizations cited the report, including the UN Economic Commission for Latin America and the Caribbean, the United Nations Development Programme, the African Union, among others.

=== World Migration Report 2018 ===
The World Migration Report 2018 has been referenced in a wide range of peer-reviewed research outputs. The report has featured in articles released in the academic journal The Lancet on five occasions, as well as books released by Cambridge University Press and Oxford University Press. It has also been attributed as a source in reports produced by the Finnish government and Save the Children, The SAGE Handbook of International Migration, the United Nations' 2018 World Happiness Report and an Oxford Research Encyclopedia focusing on migrants and refugees in Africa.

In their guide "Immigration Data Matters," the Migration Policy Institute recommended the report as a source of "current and historical estimates of international migrants by destination and/or origin."

The 2018 Report was employed as a fact-checking resource against xenophobic claims on social media.

== World Migration Report 2026 ==
The World Migration Report 2026 is the thirteenth edition of the IOM's flagship World Migration Report publication series. It explores recent developments in migration and mobility globally and was launched during the International Migration Review Forum (IMRF) week in New York.

=== Chapters of the report ===
The World Migration Report 2026 has 8 chapters, the first of which presents an overview of the report and discusses how migration continues to be part of the solution for many economies, societies and families around the world. The other 7 chapters aim to inform current and future policy deliberations and discussions by providing key data, a clear identification of the key issues, a critical overview of relevant research and analysis and a discussion of the implications for future research and policymaking.

Chapter 2 draws upon global sources of data to provide an overview of key figures and trends regarding the stocks and flows of international migrants, as well as remittances. After an initial review of overall migrant stocks and flows, the chapter looks at these trends for specific migrant groups, including migrant workers, international students, refugees, asylum seekers and internally displaced persons.

Chapter 3 focuses on key regional dimensions of, and developments in, migration in six world regions: Africa, Asia, Europe, Latin America and the Caribbean, Northern America, and Oceania. An overview and brief discussion of key population-related statistics is provided for each of these regions.

Chapters 4–8 of the World Migration Report 2026 examine complex and emerging migration issues, including migration’s contribution to development, regular migration pathways, climate mobility, internal displacement, and disability and migration.

=== Collaboration ===
The report is a highly collaborative venture, drawing on expertise of IOM staff specialising in migration programme delivery, policy development and migration research and analysis, as well as leading migration researchers from around the world. The report was peer-reviewed by IOM experts and senior migration academics, including:

- S. Irudaya Rajan, International Institute for Migration and Development
- Gibril Faal, Director, GK Partners and London School of Economics and Political Science
- Simon McMahon, Independent consultant
- Luciana Gandini, National Autonomous University of Mexico
- Daouda Diallo, University of the Witwatersrand.
- Alina Narusova-Schmitz, Independent consultant
- Nikki Herwanger, Independent consultant
- Carolina Moreno, Universidad de los Andes
- Naziye Dirikgil, Sakarya University
- Celine Bauloz, Independent consultant
- Nicola Burns, University of Glasgow
- Nara Khamkhom, Mahidol University.

== See also ==
- International Organization for Migration
- Human migration
