= Migration Letters =

- Discipline: social sciences
- Language: English
- Edited by: Ibrahim Sirkeci, Jeffrey H. Cohen, Elli Heikkila

Publication details
- History: 2004-present
- Publisher: Transnational Press London (United Kingdom)
- Frequency: biannually
- Open access: hybrid

Standard abbreviations
- ISO 4: Migr. Lett.

Indexing
- ISSN: 1741-8984 (print); 1741-8992 (web)

Links
- Journal homepage

Migration Letters is an international triannual (Jan.-May-Sep.) peer-reviewed academic journal of migration studies published by Transnational Press London since 2004. Topics covered range from internal migration to transnational mobility and from voluntary to forced migration. Migration Letters is indexed and abstracted by the International Bibliography of the Social Sciences. The current co-editors are Ibrahim Sirkeci, Jeffrey Cohen, Elli Heikkilä, and Carla De Tona. Notable contributors to the journal include Ron J. Johnston (Victoria Medal in Geography, 1990), Caroline Brettell, Gordon F. De Jong, Philip L. Martin and Thomas Faist.
