= Religion and human migration =

Religion and human migration have been intertwined throughout history. Religious demography changes are often the consequences, and sometimes the goals, resulting from mass migration to other territories. Often, political migration aims to establish a territory and governments biased towards and welcoming of sect members. Religious beliefs and practices have served as significant motivations for migration, with people seeking religious freedom or fleeing religious persecution. This interaction of religion and migration has led to the spread and diversity of religions around the world, as well as the emergence of new religious practices and beliefs as people adapt to new environments and interact with different cultures.

== Examples ==
=== Buddhist migration ===
Main article: Buddhism

Buddhism as a religion first originated in the Indian subcontinent, and spread throughout the continent of Asia. According to the University of Washington, the religion spread to the regions of southeast and central Asia along with China. Buddhism would primarily spread along the silk road, and would later on find itself in pockets around the globe, with around 8.5 million Buddhists still residing within India, now a religious minority in the country of its own creation.

=== Aliyah to Israel ===
Multiple waves of Jewish immigrants in the Jewish diaspora arrived in portions of Ottoman Palestine and British Palestine, in what is now the state of Israel. Each wave is known as an Aliyah. The first wave, or First Aliyah, began in 1881, with many Jews arriving in subsequent waves via both legal and illegal immigration until Israel was founded in 1948. Some of this immigration came about due to religious beliefs, some due to cultural or economic factors, and some immigrants were Jewish refugees fleeing antisemitic persecution.

=== Plymouth Colony ===
The Plymouth Colony was established in 1620 by a sect of English Dissenters. They fled first to the Netherlands following persecution by the English monarchy before moving to North America by boat. The migration, settlement and interaction with the Native peoples of Massachusetts would be celebrated in the present-day United States as Thanksgiving and a watershed moment for religious liberty on the continent.

=== Massachusetts Bay Colony ===
The Massachusetts Bay Colony was established eight years after the Plymouth Colony by Puritans. One leader of the movement, John Winthrop, sought to establish a "city upon a hill" as an example for other colonies to follow, and Puritanism was enforced, at the expense of other religious movements, as the favored religion of the colony for the majority of its history until its merger with Plymouth and other nearby settlements in 1691 into the Province of Massachusetts Bay.

=== Mormon migration to Utah ===
Members of the Church of Jesus Christ of Latter-day Saints were motivated to migrate from Nauvoo, Illinois to Utah due to both violent persecutions directed against the sect by Protestant citizens and government officials as well as a desire by Brigham Young to establish a Mormon majority territory that would be governed according to Mormon sensibilities and divine law. The Mormon population migrated to Utah in the late 19th century and established settlements, eventually drawing the ire of the United States government for some time, before the territory (also referred to colloquially as "Deseret") was integrated into the Territory of Utah.

=== Pakistan-India ===
In 1947, upon the Partition of India, large populations moved from India to Pakistan and vice versa, depending on their religious beliefs. The partition was promulgated in the Indian Independence Act 1947 as a result of the dissolution of the British Indian Empire. The partition displaced up to 12.5 million people in the former British Indian Empire, with estimates of loss of life varying from several hundred thousand to a million. Muslim residents of the former British India migrated to Pakistan (including East Pakistan which is now Bangladesh), whilst Hindu and Sikh residents of Pakistan and Hindu residents of East Pakistan (now Bangladesh) moved in the opposite direction.

In modern India, estimates based on industry sectors mainly employing migrants suggest that there are around 100 million circular migrants in India. Caste, social networks and historical precedents play a powerful role in shaping patterns of migration. Migration for the poor is mainly circular, as despite moving temporarily to urban areas, they lack the social security which might keep them there more permanently. They are also keen to maintain a foothold in home areas during the agricultural season.

Research by the Overseas Development Institute identifies a rapid movement of labour from slower- to faster-growing parts of the economy. Migrants can often find themselves excluded by urban housing policies, and migrant support initiatives are needed to give workers improved access to market information, certification of identity, housing and education.
