= Rafik Schami =

Syrian-German author, storyteller and critic

- رفيق شامي
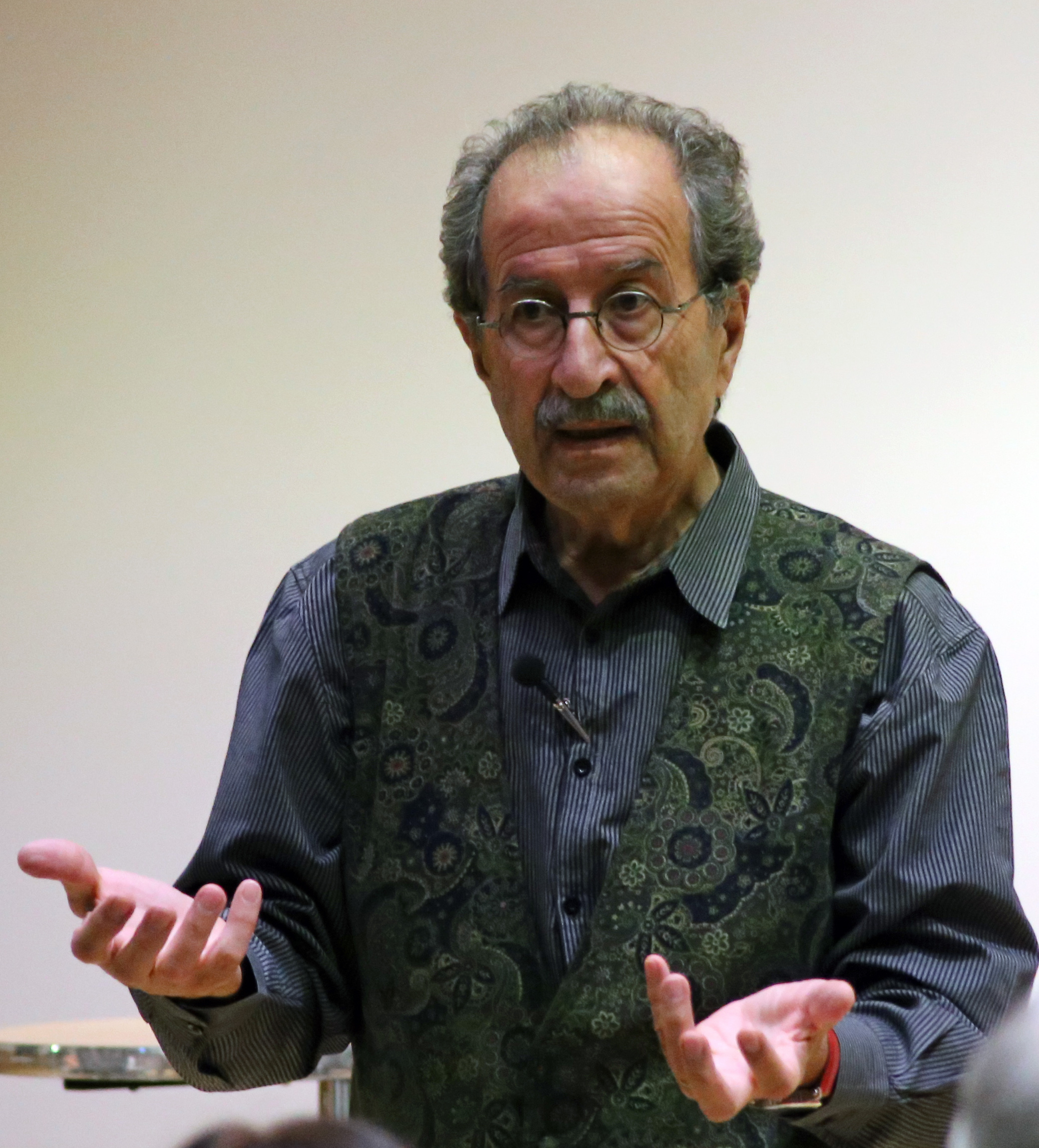
- Rafik Schami
- Born: 23 June 1946 (age 80); Damascus, Syria
- Known for: Author, storyteller and critic
- Website: rafik-schami.de

Rafik Schami (Arabic: رفيق شامي), born Suheil Fadel (سهيل فاضل) 23 June 1946) is a Syrian-German author, storyteller and critic.

== Biography ==
Born in Syria in 1946, Schami is the son of a baker from a Christian Aramean (Syriac) family. His family originated from the town of Maaloula. After attending a monastery boarding school in Lebanon, he studied chemistry, mathematics, and physics in Damascus. In 1970, he left Syria for Lebanon to evade censorship and the military draft; the following year, he moved to Germany. There, Schami continued his studies in chemistry while working odd jobs, obtaining a doctorate in 1979.

From 1965, Schami began writing stories in Arabic. From 1964 to 1970, he was the co-founder and editor of the wall news-sheet Al-Muntalak (The Starting-Point) in the old quarter of Damascus. Later in Germany, in his spare time, he co-founded the literary group Südwind in 1980 and was part of the PoLiKunst movement. Schami became a full-time author in 1982. He currently lives in the city of Kirchheimbolanden with his Bavarian wife and son and holds dual citizenship. Schami's books have been translated into 29 languages.

== Assessment ==
Syrian-born Rafik Schami rates as one of the leading figures of German migrant literature. "Guest-workers", mainly from Turkey, began to arrive in Germany in 1960, and by 1968 they numbered over 150,000. A distinctive migrant literature began to emerge significantly as a result of both Schami's own writing and his role as a facilitator for other writers. In 1980 he co-founded the literary groups Südwind (South Wind) and PoLiKunst (Polynationaler Literatur- und Kunstverein; Polynational Literary and Art Society), which encouraged all forms of migrant cultural production.

Typical themes of migrant literature are conditions in the homeland and life as an alien in Germany. Both of these are to be found in Schami's works, but unlike many migrant writings in German, they never degenerate into a lament on the difficulties of the foreign worker or an exposé of German xenophobia. Rather, a sympathy and tolerance for cultural diversity. Mostly they are set in Damascus, occasionally in Maaloula, the village the author's family originates from. They describe life in the Arab world for the benefit of the western reader, providing factual information and offering insights into aspects of daily life. In the process, they quietly undermine all kinds of prejudice.

The short novel Eine Hand voller Sterne (1987; A Hand Full of Stars), which contains many autobiographical elements, is a good example of this. It takes the form of the diary of a Damascene youth, following his progress through school, work, and family life, and featuring the themes of friendship and first love in a difficult situation of social conflict. Without ever appearing didactic, it educates the reader to an awareness of the richness of life in a foreign culture. Important here is the differentiating presentation of the Arab world which militates against the homogeneity of western perceptions. Like the author, the diary-writer stands in the Christian tradition: not all Arabs are Muslims. Cultural and religious diversity in Syria is a key theme in the book, for example in the riddle of the "madman", which can only be solved by the co-operation of all the communities in Damascus. The story "Nuh, mein Freund" ("My Friend Nuh") in the collection Der Fliegenmelker (1985; The Fly Milker) deals with the young man's discovery of an affection for the Kurdish minority.

If the fiction set in Syria presents a positive view of Arab family and social structures, it frequently contains critical comment on Damascene politics, on corruption, censorship, issues of civil and human rights. It was because of these problems that Schami himself left Syria and was unable to return. A Hand Full of Stars is again a good example, charting as it does the growing political awareness of the boy as he discovers journalism as a form of civil resistance. The story "Als der Angstmacher Angst bekam" ("When the Fear-maker became Afraid") in Der Fliegenmelker takes a malicious delight in the downfall of a government informer, a stock figure in Schami's Damascene fiction. Other texts speak of the fear of police brutality, skepticism vis à vis government propaganda and disillusionment as a series of coups fail to bring political change.

By contrast, Schami has a generally positive view of Germany. In interviews and speeches he warns against undercurrents of intolerance but speaks optimistically of the Germans as a people well-placed precisely because of their history to embrace foreign elements. Some stories dealing generally with intolerance and injustice could certainly be read in the context of migrant workers in Germany. One commentator interprets the title story of Das Letzte Wort der Wanderratte (1984; The Itinerant Rat's Last Word) in this way: rats = guest-workers, humans = Germans, massacre of Hamelin rats = Holocaust; the interpretation is possible but not necessary. Similarly the title story of Das Schaf im Wolfspelz (1982; Sheep in Wolf's Clothing) and many others which very obviously contain a social moral could certainly be taken to address the situation in Germany but could be equally applicable in Syria or elsewhere. The story "Vampire lieben Knoblauch" ("Vampires Love Garlic") in Das Letzte Wort der Wanderratte tells how Günter with his crucifix and Ali with his crescent are equally helpless victims of the predator, Dracula; it is a mistake to seek anti-German polemic in Schami's writing.

His sharpest criticism is directed against the principle of assimilation, with its implication that outsiders settling in Germany should abandon their own cultural identity. In the story "Als der Meister auftrat" ("When the Master Entered") in Das Letzte Wort der Wanderratte, the migrant worker Hassan has himself transformed into a Siegfried, only to discover that the deception is untenable. The magician who sells him his German skin is named Gnussapna – an inversion of Anpassung, assimilation. As an alternative the story speaks of bridge-building, the disarming of prejudices in both communities. Against the pressure for ethnic minorities to become invisible, Schami champions the concept of a boldly multicultural society, which indeed was the basic ideal of the PoLiKunst movement. A fine expression of the importance of co-existence is the parable "Der Wald und das Streichholz" ("The Forest and the Matchstick") in Der Fliegenmelker: if the pines and the olives each hope the match will burn the others, it will burn them all.

The overriding characteristic of Schami's style is its affinity to the oral tradition of Arabic story-telling: one could speak of an integration of Arabic and German narrative traditions. Most of his books are collections of stories, while the novels abound in echoes of the Arabian Nights, even in the titles of Erzähler der Nacht (1989; Damascus Nights) or Der ehrliche Lügner (1992; The Honest Liar), is subtitled: Roman von tausendundeiner Lüge (Novel of 1001 Lies). Both are structured as a series of inserted stories presented orally by protagonists within a narrative framework. Damascus Nights in particular is a story about story-telling. Vom Zauber der Zunge (1991; On the Magic of the Tongue) gives an account of the background to it. Schami began as a child telling stories to his friends on the streets of Damascus, and his promotional appearances are less public readings than free retellings of his works. Story-tellers are favorite protagonists.

One consequence of this is that the target audience is extremely fluid: while some of his works are clearly published as children's literature (picture books, cassettes), the distinction between youth, young adult and adult literature is not easily made; traditional story-telling addresses the entire community at once. The interplay of truth and fiction, always difficult concepts, is a recurring theme in Schami's writings. Der ehrliche Lügner opens with the words: "My name is Sadik, but not even that is certain." Elsewhere we are told that the important thing is not whether stories are true, but rather how we live with them (A Hand Full of Stars). Although elements from fairy-tale worlds may appear in these stories, they are always rooted in daily life. Schami has made a distinction between Illusion and Phantasie (illusion and vision). Illusion is an unachievable dream, distorting the world to something impossible, whereas vision is the imaginative construction of achievable goals; rooted in reality it indicates something which can be striven for, but this reality means also accepting the other possibility, that there may not be a happy ending. Asked by a radio interviewer whether literature is an escape from reality, Schami answers, yes: but one which enables the reader to return to reality better equipped.

== Literary prizes ==
- Adelbert-von-Chamisso-Förderpreis 1985;
- Thaddäus-Troll-Preis des Förderkreises deutscher Schriftsteller in Baden-Württemberg 1986; *ZDF-Leseratten-Preis 1987;
- Zürcher Kinder- und Jugendbuchpreis "La vache qui lit" 1987;
- Die blaue Brillenschlange 1987;
- Jenny-Smelik-Kiggen Preis 1989;
- Österreicher Staatspreis (Austrian State Prize) Ehrenliste 1989;
- Rattenfänger-Preis der Stadt Hameln 1990;
- Phantastikpreis der Stadt Wetzlar 1990;
- Mildred L. Batchelder Award, for the English translation A Hand Full of Stars, 1991
- Adelbert-von-Chamisso-Preis 1993;
- Hermann-Hesse-Literaturpreis 1994;
- Hans-Erich-Nossack-Preis der deutschen Wirtschaft 1997;
- Nelly Sachs Prize 2006.
- Hermann-Sinsheimer-Preis
- Carl Zuckmayer Medal 2022

== Works of fiction ==
- Andere Märchen, 1978
- Das Schaf im Wolfspelz: Märchen und Fabeln, 1982
- Luki: die Abenteuer eines kleinen Vogels, 1983
- Das letzte Wort der Wanderratte: Märchen, Fabeln und phantastische Geschichten, 1984
- Der Fliegenmelker: Geschichten aus Damaskus, 1985
- Weshalb darf Babs wieder lachen?, 1985
- Der erste Ritt durchs Nadelöhr: noch mehr Märchen, Fabeln und phantastische Geschichten, 1985
- Bobo und Susu: Als der Elefant sich in eine Maus verliebte, 1986
- Der Kameltreiber von Heidelberg (radio play) 1986
- Eine Hand voller Sterne, 1987; (A Hand Full of Stars, translateted by Rika Lesser, 1990)
- Malula: Märchen und Märchenhaftes aus meinem Dorf, 1987
- Als die Puppen aus der Reihe tanzten (play) 1987
- Die Sehnsucht fährt schwarz: Geschichten aus der Fremde, 1988
- Erzähler der Nacht, 1989 (Damascus Nights, translated by Philip Böhm, 1993?)
- Der Löwe Benilo, 1989
- Der Wunderkasten, 1990
- Der fliegende Baum: Die schönsten Märchen, Fabeln und phantastischen Geschichten, 1991
- Der ehrliche Lügner, 1992
- Das ist kein Papagei, 1994
- Reise zwischen Nacht und Morgen, 1995
- Der Schnabelsteher, 1995 (The Crow Who Stood on His Beak, translated by Anthea Bell 1996)
- Fatima und der Traumdieb, 1995 (Fatima and the Dream Thief, translated by Anthea Bell 1996)
- Loblied und andere Olivenkerne, 1996
- Milad: von einem, der auszog, um einundzwanzig Tage satt zu werden, 1997
- Gesammelte Olivenkerne, 1997
- Vom Zauber der Zunge, Reden gegen das Verstummen, 1998
- Die dunkle Seite der Liebe, 2004 (The Dark Side of Love, translated by Anthea Bell 2009)
- Was ich schaffe, überdauert die Zeit, 2008
- Das Geheimnis des Kalligraphen, 2008 (The Calligrapher's Secret, translated by Anthea Bell 2011)
- Die geheime Mission des Kardinals, 2019

== Published speeches and interviews ==
- Vom Zauber der Zunge: Reden gegen das Verstummen, 1991
- Der brennende Eisberg: Eine Rede, ihre Geschichte und noch mehr, 1994
- Zeiten des Erzählens, edited by Erich Jooß, 1994
- Damals dort und heute hier, edited by Erich Jooß, 1998

== Sources ==
This article is taken (with permission) from: Dunphy, Graeme (2000). "Rafik Schami". In Konzett, Matthias (ed.). Encyclopedia of German Literature. Chicago: Fitzroy Dearborn Publishers. pp. 849–851. ISBN 1-57958-138-2.

== See also ==
- Migrant literature
- German literature
