= Gastarbeiterroute =

German slang term for a defunct European road

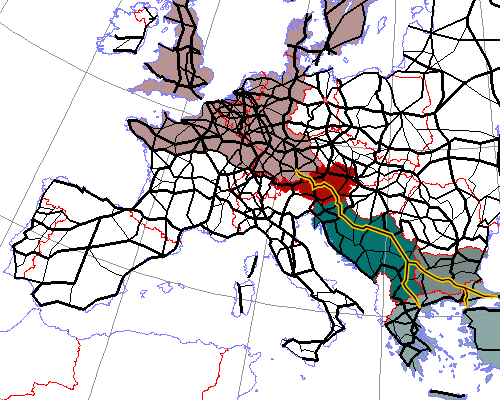
Gastarbeiterroute overlaid on the present E-road network

Gastarbeiterroute is a German language slang term originating in the 1970s. It referred to the former European route 5, which started in Munich and terminated in either Istanbul or Thessaloniki. In summer, as well as for Christmas and Easter, so-called gastarbeiters working in West Germany, Austria and Western Europe would drive their automobiles south on the gastarbeiterroute through Austria and Yugoslavia to their countries of origin. It was notoriously dangerous for drivers and passengers who traveled on congested roads not suited to such heavy traffic.

The route ran from Munich on the German Bundesautobahn 8 to Salzburg and further southwards on the Austrian Tauern Autobahn, which then ended at Golling at the northern rim of the Alps. Drivers had to take the highway (Bundesstraße) to Bischofshofen, Radstadt, and through the Enns valley to Liezen, Leoben, Bruck an der Mur, and Graz. The route passed the Austrian–Yugoslav border at Spielfeld and ran further south to Maribor, Varaždin, and Zagreb. From Zagreb, the notorious Brotherhood and Unity Highway (Autoput) led to Belgrad and Niš, where the route forked: one branch led via Skopje and Evzoni to Thessaloniki, the other branch ran southeastwards along the ancient Via Militaris through Bulgaria to Istanbul.

== See also ==
- Gastarbeiter
