= Theory of intervening opportunities =

Theory of intervening opportunities attempts to describe the likelihood of migration. Its hypothesis is that this likelihood is influenced most by the opportunities to settle at the destination, less by distance or population pressure at the starting point.

Stouffer's law of intervening opportunities states, "The number of persons going a given distance is directly proportional to the number of opportunities at that distance and inversely proportional to the number of intervening opportunities."

Stouffer theorises that the amount of migration over a given distance is directly proportional to the number of opportunities at the place of destination, and inversely proportional to the number of opportunities between the place of departure and the place of destination. These intervening opportunities may persuade a migrant to settle in a place in the route rather than proceeding to the originally planned destination. Stouffer argued that the volume of migration had less to do with distance and population totals than with the opportunities in each location. This is in contrast to Zipf's Inverse distance law.

There are links with Ravenstein's laws of migration 2, 3 and 4.
