= Buffer theory =

Late 1950s migration policy

In the late 1950s a number of European countries (most notably West Germany and France) decided on a migration policy known as the buffer theory.

Owing to rapid economic recovery in the post-World War II period (aided by the American Marshall plan) there were many more job vacancies than people who were available or becoming available in the workforce to fill them. To resolve this situation the countries decided to "import" workers from the southern Mediterranean basin (including North Africa) in a temporary capacity to fill this labour shortfall.

These workers were invitees of the governments and came to Europe initially on the understanding that they could at any point in time in the future be repatriated if and when economic circumstances changed. These Gastarbeiter as they became known in Germany were mainly young unskilled males who very often left their families behind in their country of origin and migrated alone as 'economic migrants'. They worked predominantly in certain areas of the economy where working conditions were poorer than those of indigenous Germans and where the rates of pay were considerably lower. Ultimately they came to predominate in low-paid service-rated employment. The situation remained unchanged until the 1970s economic recession.

Jobs were being lost in manufacturing and industry in particular but not necessarily in the occupational types in which the migrants worked. In 1974 the then West German government imposed a ban restricting any future economic migrants and offered the possibility of returning to their country of origin to many others; few migrants took up the offer and they stayed at their jobs or began to receive unemployment assistance from the state. This led to increased tensions and feelings of resentment from many German people.

== Second wave of migration ==
Throughout the 1970s and into the 1980s family reunification took place between Turkish migrants workers and their families. This reunification however took place in Germany rather than in Turkey. In a difficult economic climate after the 1973 oil crisis it was generally believed by most Turks already in Germany that their economic circumstances would be measurably better there than back in Turkey at such a difficult time. The welfare state offered considerable financial support to all people within Germany including immigrants communities. The number of foreign residents therefore increased in absolute terms during this time period.

The German government's offer to repatriate people back to their home country was not very successful. This created a difficult situation for the German government which became increasingly worse as the number of immigrants swelled to their highest levels ever. Any resentment, hostility and bitterness already present between indigenous Germans and the Turkish community became progressively worse. This often culminated in physical attacks on immigrants, arson and overt racial discrimination. There was a feeling amongst Germans that "they have taken our jobs", but this situation only arose because of Germans themselves losing their jobs in industry and manufacturing in particular in the difficult economic situation post 1973. (NB This 'family reunification' corresponds with the second wave on the Everett S. Lee model of migration).

== Third wave of migration ==
Dates to the period from 1989 onwards with the collapse of the Iron Curtain and the communist regimes in Eastern Europe. East Germans flooded into West Germany along with many ethnic Germans from central and eastern Europe. Germany accepted them as they were political refugees and very often asylum seekers.

== Other migration models ==
- Zipf's inverse distance law (1946)
- Gravity model of migration and the friction of distance
- Stouffer's theory of intervening opportunities (1940)
- Lee's push-pull theory (1966)

== See also ==
- Berber people
- Ethnic cleansing
- Foreign worker
- Gastarbeiter
- Immigration policy
- Pied-noir
- Racial integration
