= Repatriation in Canada =

Repatriation is the practice of returning a cultural artifact to its place of origin. Within the context of Canada, this is often associated with institution and collectors returning cultural artifacts to their original Indigenous community. Cultural artifacts may have been appropriated, stolen, sold, or taken from their place of origin. Many of the early collectors of Canadian indigenous cultural items did so with the assumption that the culture was on the brink of destruction. Many scholars considered it imperative to obtain and collect these items before they were destroyed under the guise of salvage ethnography. This was supported by racist ideologies suggesting that indigenous cultures were primitive and therefore inferior to the culture of dominant colonial society.

Repatriation is seen as part of the Truth and Reconciliation movement in Canada. As part of this many Canadian museums now have policies in regard to how indigenous cultural materials are obtained. In addition, many indigenous groups seek to negotiate with museums and other institutions to have important indigenous items, as well as human remains, returned to the group of origin.

== The Spirit Sings Controversy and aftermath ==
A major shift in the history of repatriation in Canada arose surrounding an exhibition called The Spirit Sings. This exhibition was created by the Glenbow Museum and included over 600 examples of Indigenous artwork sourced from several international museums. The exhibit was hosted by the Glenbow Museum from January to May 1988 before moving to the Canadian Museum of History (formerly the Canadian Museum of Civilization) in Ottawa.

Three years into the planning of this exhibit in 1986, controversy and a boycott were called for. This was largely based on the announcement that Shell was a major sponsor. The Lubicon Lake Cree First Nation criticized the hypocrisy of Shell sponsoring an exhibit to celebrate indigenous art while their ongoing land claims with the company had stalled. Others criticized this exhibit as well as several other controversial museum exhibits from the 1980s for their display of sacred items.

Despite criticism, the exhibition opened to the public but issues continued to be raised. On opening day the Kahnawake Mohawk were granted a temporary injunction to stop the display of ga:goh:sah or false face masks on the basis that displaying them was a desecration of sacred items. This request was later overturned by a judge on the basis that the masks had been previously displayed to the public. When the exhibit moved to Ottawa the masks were replaced with replicas. This may have been influenced by requests made by the Onk-wehonwe in the 1970s for the Canadian Museum of History not to display similar masks. Similar issues were raised with other items included in the exhibit such as Blackfoot medicine bundles.

The controversy over the Spirit Sings exhibition led to responses from several large organizations and institutions. The International Committee for Museum Ethnography (ICME) held a conference to discuss the issues raised by the exhibit. This conference agreed that a National Task Force should be created to support partnerships between Museums and First Peoples. The Museum Task Force Report of 1992, created by the National Task Force of Museums and First Peoples had several recommendations related to repatriation. The recommendation is made to increase the involvement of Indigenous peoples in making decisions regarding repatriation. NAGPRA (Native American Graves Protection and Repatriation Act) was considered when making recommendations but the report suggests that case-by-case negotiations based on ethical and moral standards would be preferred over a legal approach. The act recommends the return of all human remains to their families, community, or First Nation. For other objects, the report recommends consultation by First Nations groups as equal partners to museums. The report recommends solutions such as returning the object to the indigenous community of origin, loans, shared custody agreements, or replication of objects. The report also calls on institutions to promote the repatriation of human remains and artifacts located internationally. Museums and similar institutions are encouraged to create specific policies for indigenous cultural materials and to increase access to information about indigenous items within collections.

== Issues with repatriation ==
Several arguments have been made against repatriation. Repatriation has been resisted over concerns of the original group being unable to house the items in line with best conservation practices. Concerns are also raised as to if these materials belong to the general public rather than a specific group. During the creation of the Museum of Vancouver’s repatriation policy, board members raised concerns over the return of items. This line of concern ignores the unequal circumstances that allowed for the possession of these items. During the Spirit Sings controversy, there was pushback to the boycott on the basis that the protesters were limiting the freedom of academics to research and publish. The response to this was that any academic research and publications on indigenous issues should be made in consultation with appropriate groups.

Even in cases where repatriation is fully supported, many problems may cause repatriation to be interrupted. Paperwork reporting the accession of items may be scant or entirely lacking. This can make it difficult to determine the group of origin that remains or cultural materials should be returned to. Alternatively, several groups or individuals may approach an institution with conflicting repatriation requests. Claimants must also have sufficient evidence that they have a historical claim to the items. There is also the possibility that the culture of origin has not survived to the modern day or that the group does not wish to have these items repatriated. Indigenous groups on the Canada-US border may also face restrictions due to the laws related to international borders. Repatriation can also be financially tasking for both indigenous communities and institutions resulting in stalled negotiations.

== Legal and policy precedent ==
- There are no federal laws in Canada related to repatriation.
- Alberta is the only province with specific laws relating to repatriation with First Nations Sacred Ceremonial Objects Repatriation Act being updated in 2016.
- In 1997 the Supreme court accepted oral history as equal to other historical evidence in Delgamuukw v. British Columbia.
- UNDRIP article 12 section 1 supports the rights of indigenous peoples to use and control ceremonial objects and to repatriate human remains.
- Section 91 of the Indian Act protects cultural heritage located on reserves, with totem poles, grave houses, and rock carvings being among the items explicitly protected.
- Under the 2007 Royal Saskatchewan Museum Act the Royal Saskatchewan Museum was charged with creating a policy to address aboriginal concerns. In 2011 the museum voluntarily implemented a repatriation policy.

== Examples of repatriation in Canada ==
=== Haida ancestors ===
In 2005 the last known Haida ancestor located in a North American museum was repatriated. Over 450 human remains of known Haida origin were housed in North American museums. Many of these Haida ancestors were taken from the Haida Gwaii after a severe smallpox epidemic that left many bodies unburied. These remains were then taken from the island through bribery and theft. Traditional bentwood boxes were created to house and bury the repatriated ancestor. An end-of-mourning ceremony was held for some of the ancestors which included gifts, prayers, and water offerings taken to sea by canoe. The repatriated remains were buried in a local cemetery and a cedar plaque was erected. The number of remains repatriated, where they had been repatriated from, as well as the village of origin (if known) were carved onto the plaque. Other repatriated remains were buried in Old Massett cemetery with offerings but no end-of-mourning ceremony. It was decided that it was not yet time for a similar ceremony. Efforts continue to repatriated Haida ancestors located in international museums as well as identify previously unknown Haida ancestors that could remain in institutions or museums.

=== Kwakwaka'wakw Potlach Regalia ===
Potlatch regalia belonging to the Kwakwaka'wakw chief Dan Cranmer was confiscated in 1922 through laws banning the practice of potlach ceremonies. In 1975 the descendants of Dan Cranmer were successful in having the items returned from the National Museum of Canada with assistance from the Department of Indian Affairs. In 2001 other cultural items confiscated from the first nation were repatriated from the Canadian Museum of Natural History.

=== Our Grieving Mother ===
In 1926 a statue previously called the Sechelt Image, now renamed to “Our Grieving Mother” was sold to the Museum of Vancouver. The statue originated from the Shishalh Nation (formally the Sechelt) who classify the statue as a living entity. In 1976 the Shishalh Nation requested the return of the statue but this was denied. The museum justified this position by giving the community a replica, citing concerns for the preservation of the statue. In February 2010, the Shishalh Nation once again contacted the Museum of Vancouver to repatriate "Our Grieving Mother". This request was made after several changes to Museum policy that emphasized repatriation. The Museum’s collection committee and the board approved the repatriation after conversations with the Museum’s curator. On October 15 of the same year, Sechelt leaders journeyed to the Museum to prepare Our Grieving Mother for the return journey both spiritually and physically. Museum staff then officially repatriated the statue to Sechelt and attended the subsequent celebration.

=== Penelakut Island Skull ===
A human skull from Penelakut island in the possession of the Museum of Vancouver was to be repatriated. Few records existed as to where the skull had been taken from and when. As three indigenous groups historically called the island home all would need to be consulted for repatriation. Spiritual leaders from each group were able to come to an agreement allowing for the repatriation process to move forward. The skull was reburied in Lamalchi Bay on Penelakut island.

=== Sasq'et Mask ===
In 1930’s a person from the Sts’ailes Nation reported having a spiritual encounter with Sasqu’ets, colloquially called Sasquatch. This encounter caused the person to carve a Sasqu’et mask in 1938 to be used as part of a winter dance called the Syowen ceremony. The mask was part of a larger costume that is deeply tied to an individual person. In 1939 a white schoolteacher donated the mask to the Museum of Vancouver. How this teacher came into possession of this spiritual object is unknown.

In 2013 leaders from the Sts’ailes Nation wrote to the museum to begin the process of repatriation. The Sts’ailes Nation asserted that they had a legal as well as spiritual claim to the mask, resulting in the return of the item.
