= Gastarbeiter =

Migrant worker in Germany

In German-speaking countries, the term Gastarbeiter (pronounced [ˈɡastˌʔaʁbaɪtɐ]; both singular and plural) refers to foreign or migrant workers, particularly those who had moved to West Germany between 1955 and 1973, seeking work as part of a formal guest worker program (German: Gastarbeiterprogramm).

Other countries had similar programs: in the Netherlands and Belgium it was called the gastarbeider program; in Sweden, Denmark and Norway it was called arbetskraftsinvandring (workforce-immigration); and in East Germany such workers were called Vertragsarbeiter.

== Terminology ==
In Nazi Germany, the term used to refer to foreign workers was Fremdarbeiter. However, the term obscured the compulsory nature of the work, and after World War II, the term has since been used to distinguish worker policies of the Nazi era to the Gastarbeiter programs of the Federal Republic of Germany. After the war, Germans no longer spoke about 'troops of nomads', but 'guestworkers'.

As a loanword, Gastarbeiter is also widely used in Russia (Russian: гастарбайтер, gastarbayter) to refer to foreign workers in the country from post-USSR or third-world countries.

== Historical background ==
Following World War II, there were severe labour shortages in continental Northern Europe, and high unemployment in Southern European countries including Turkey. West Germany set the pace for large-scale guestworker programs, and in many cases, German employers collaborated with states facing high unemployment rates to organize and promote these programs. Therefore, migrant workers from Southern Europe went to West Germany to find work and addressed the labor shortage in the country.

== West Germany ==
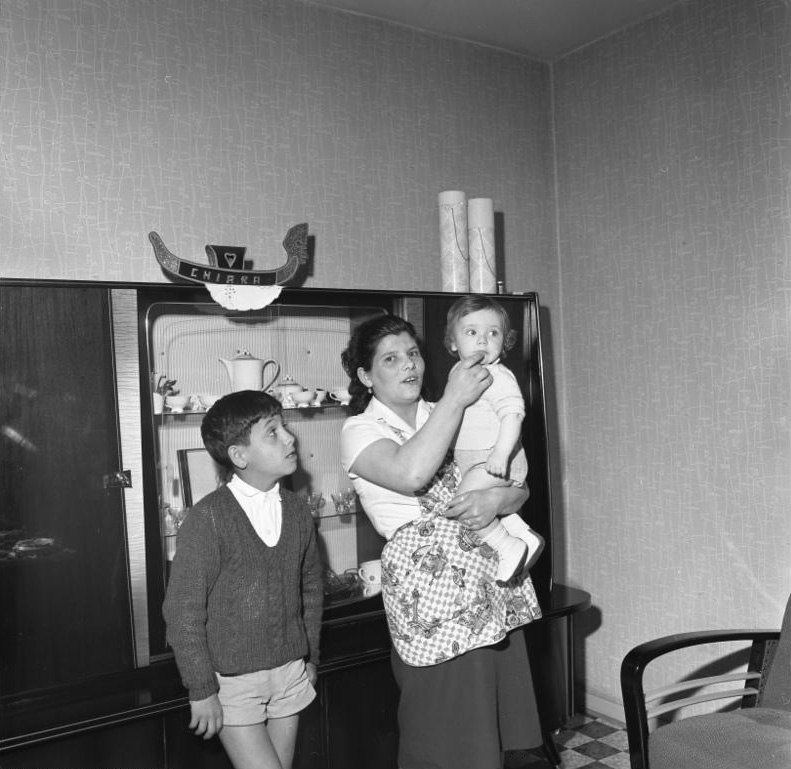
1962: An Italian Gastarbeiter family in Walsum (This woman's husband is a miner working for the German Walsum Mines.)

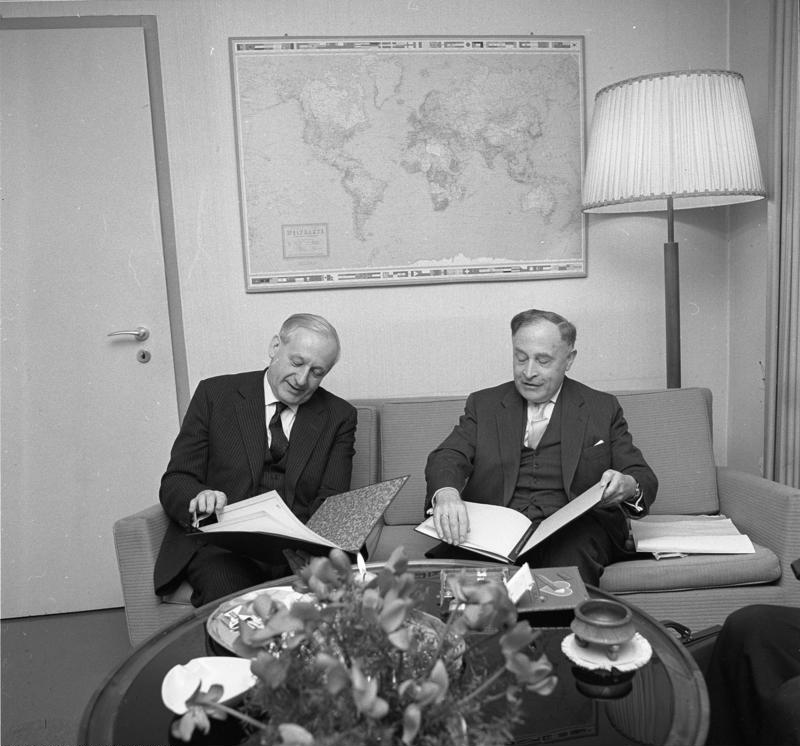
Irish guest workers are recruited (1961), left: Ministerialdirektor Haeften, right: Irish ambassador Warnock

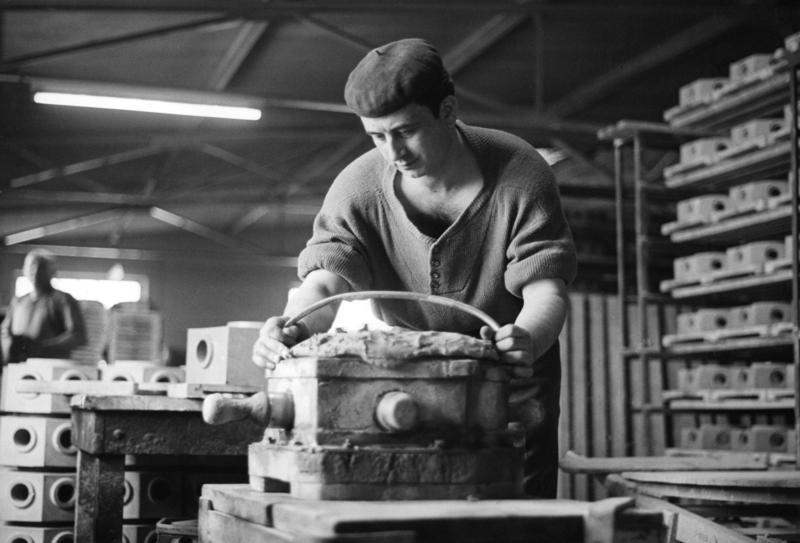
Italian Gastarbeiter, a 'factory worker' in the Rhineland (1962)

During the 1950s and 1960s, West Germany signed bilateral recruitment agreements with a number of countries: Italy (22 November 1955), Spain (29 March 1960), Greece (30 March 1960), Turkey (30 October 1961), Morocco (21 June 1963), South Korea (16 December 1963), Portugal (17 March 1964), Tunisia (18 October 1965), and Yugoslavia (12 October 1968). Japan also had an agreement (January 1957), although the number of coal mine workers recruited was relatively small. These agreements allowed the recruitment of guest workers to work in the industrial sector in jobs that required few qualifications.

There were several justifications for these arrangements. Firstly, during the 1950s, Germany experienced a so-called Wirtschaftswunder or "economic miracle" and needed labourers. The labour shortage was made more acute after the building of the Berlin Wall in August 1961, which drastically reduced the large-scale flow of East German workers. Secondly, West Germany justified these programs as a form of developmental aid. It was expected that guest workers would learn useful skills which could help them build their own countries after returning home. Germany, as well as Switzerland, prioritized close neighbors for guestworkers as a safeguard for their return. However, a policy called Inländerprimat was implemented, gave priority to hiring native German workers. Kristin Surak states that by the 1970s, 2.5 million foreigners were laboring in Germany across manufacturing and services.

Since West Germany and Italy were both founding members of the ECSC and later EEC, recruitment of Italian workers dropped sharply soon, as the Treaty of Rome signed in 1957 provided for freedom of movement for workers, which in the 1960s gradually came into force. Thus by 1962, Italians no longer needed a visa to enter West Germany (an identity card would suffice), and both the recruitment agreement and the German recruitment commission for Italian workers declined in importance. Also, by 1964, the priority of domestic workers was abolished, and from 1968, a work permit was no longer required for citizens of EEC member states. In 1961, of the 165,793 Italian job seekers who came to West Germany, 107,030 (64.6%) were recruited through the commission, whereas from 1966 on, no more that 8% per year were recruited through the commission, and in 1972, only 2,092 out of 154,184 (1.4%) were. As West Germany adapted to the influx of immigrants into its labor market, its unemployment rate increased, and the population migrated from areas with higher immigrant inflows to areas with fewer immigrant inflows.

The first guest workers were recruited from European nations. However, Turkey pressured West Germany to admit its citizens as guest workers. Theodor Blank, Secretary of State for Employment, opposed such agreements. He held the opinion that the cultural gap between Germany and Turkey would be too large and also held the opinion that Germany didn't need any more labourers because there were enough unemployed people living in the poorer regions of Germany who could fill these vacancies. The United States, however, put some political pressure on Germany, wanting to stabilize and create goodwill from a potential ally. West Germany and Turkey reached an agreement in 1961.

The Heuss Turks were the name given to around 150 young Turkish citizens who came to Germany in 1958. They followed an invitation that the then Federal President Theodor Heuss had extended to Turkish vocational school graduates during a visit to Turkey in Ankara in 1957. The exchange, which was intended as a vocational training measure and began for some of the group as apprentices at the Ford plant in Cologne, became the starting point for their immigration to the Federal Republic for some. A number worked at Ford until they retired in the late 1980s/early 1990s. It was the first large group of Turkish workers to come to Germany together, even before the start of actual Turkish immigration with the recruitment agreement between the Federal Republic of Germany and Turkey in 1961. According to DOMiD reports, they were given a warm welcome in Germany and were extremely popular with their work colleagues.

After 1961 Turkish citizens (largely from rural areas) soon became the largest group of guest workers in West Germany. The migrants, men and women alike, were allowed to work in Germany for a period of one or two years before returning to their home country in order to make room for other migrants. Some migrants did return, after having built up savings for their return. The recruitment treaty was changed in 1964 so that the Turkish guest workers could stay longer. The influx of immigrants into the West German labor market led to a 1.51% decrease in the expected discounted lifetime labor income of native West German workers, and the loss in native labor income reached 5.91%.

For Turks, Tunisians and Moroccans, special rules applied: only unmarried people would be recruited; family reunification was not allowed; a health check and an aptitude test for work had to be passed; and they would not be allowed any extension past two years, and then would have to return to their home countries.

Until 2015, Germany had not been perceived as a country of immigration (kein Einwanderungsland) by both the majority of its political leaders and the majority of its population. When the country's political leaders realised that many of the persons from certain countries living in Germany were jobless, some calculations were done and according to those calculations, paying unemployed foreigners for leaving the country was cheaper in the long run than paying unemployment benefits. A Gesetz zur Förderung der Rückkehrbereitsschaft ('law to advance the willingness to return home') was passed. The government started paying jobless people from a number of countries, such as Turks, Moroccans and Tunisians, a so-called Rückkehrprämie ('repatriation grant') or Rückkehrhilfe ('repatriation help') if they returned home. A person returning home received 10,500 Deutsche Mark and an additional 1,500 Deutsche Mark for their spouse and also 1,500 Deutsche Mark for each child if they returned to their country of origin.

There were 2 coups d'état between 1960 and 1971 in Turkey and the recruitment agreement with West Germany was signed by the head of 1960 Turkish coup d'état (the first coup in Turkey) committee, Cemal Gürsel. And 6 years after the pro-military coalition governments created around Kemalist CHP were collapsed, the military intervened again with another coup in 1971. While Turkey was in this process of turmoil of events and economic collapse, the agreement between West Germany and Turkey ended in 1973 but few workers returned because there were few good jobs in Turkey. Half of the Turkish guest workers returned home, others brought in their wives and family members and settled in ethnic enclaves. In 1981 legal restrictions on the relocation of families to West Germany came into effect.

By 2010 there were about 4 million people of Turkish descent in Germany. The generation born in Germany attended German schools, but some had a poor command of either German or Turkish, and thus had either low-skilled jobs or were unemployed. Most are Muslims and some are presently reluctant to become German citizens.

Germany used the jus sanguinis principle in its nationality or citizenship law, which determined the right to citizenship based on a person's German ancestry, and not by place of birth. Accordingly, children born in Germany of a guest worker were not automatically entitled to citizenship, but were granted the Aufenthaltsberechtigung ('right to reside') and might choose to apply for German citizenship later in their lives, which was granted to persons who had lived in Germany for at least 15 years and fulfilled a number of other preconditions (they must work for their living, they should not have a criminal record, and other preconditions). Today, children of foreigners born on German soil are granted German citizenship automatically if the parent has been in Germany for at least eight years as a legal immigrant. As a rule those children may also have the citizenship of the parents' home country. Those between 18 and 23 years of age must choose to keep either German citizenship or their ancestral citizenship. The governments of the German States have begun campaigns to persuade immigrants to acquire German citizenship.

In many cases guest workers integrated neatly into German society, in particular those from other European countries with a Christian background, even if they started out poor. For example, Dietrich Tränhardt researched this topic in relation to Spanish guest workers. While many Spanish that came to Germany were illiterate peasants, their offspring were academically successful (see: Academic achievement among different groups in Germany) and do well in the job market. Spanish Gastarbeiter were more likely to marry Germans, which could be considered an indicator of assimilation. According to a study in 2000, 81.2% of all Spanish or partly Spanish children in Germany were from a Spanish-German family.

== East Germany ==
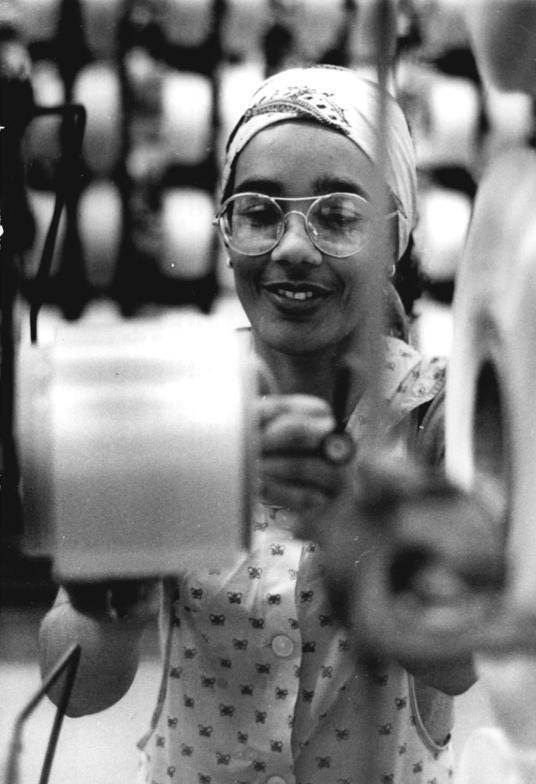
A guest worker from Cuba, working in an East German factory (Chemiefaserkombinat "Wilhelm Pieck"), 1986

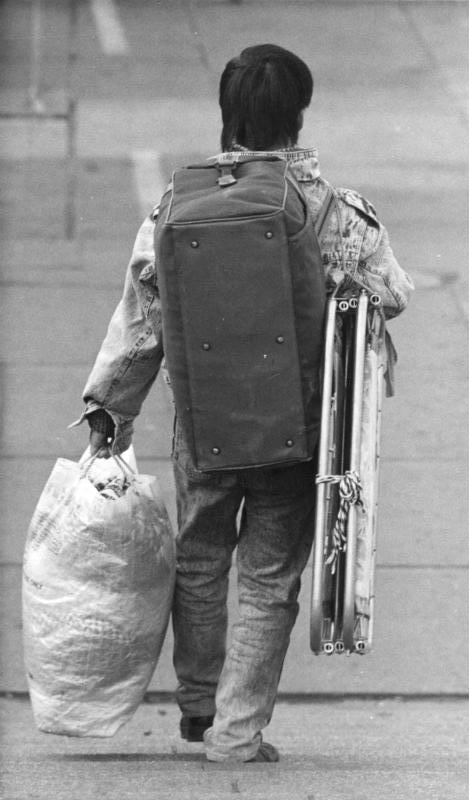
1990: Vietnamese costermonger in Gera

After the division of Germany into East and West in 1949, East Germany faced an acute labour shortage, mainly because of East Germans fleeing into the western zones occupied by the Allies; in 1966 the GDR (German Democratic Republic) signed its first guest worker contract with Poland. In contrast to the guest workers in West Germany, the guest workers that arrived in East Germany came mainly from Communist countries allied with the Soviets and the SED used its guest worker programme to build international solidarity among fellow communist governments.

The guest workers in East Germany came mainly from the Eastern Bloc, Hungary, Poland, Algeria, Cuba, Mozambique, Vietnam, Angola, and China. Residency was typically limited to only three years. The conditions East German Gastarbeiter had to live in were much harsher than the living conditions of the Gastarbeiter in West Germany; accommodation was mainly in single-sex dormitories. In addition, contact between guest workers and East German citizens was extremely limited; Gastarbeiter were usually restricted to their dormitory or an area of the city which Germans were not allowed to enter — furthermore sexual relations with a German led to deportation. Female Vertragsarbeiter were not allowed to become pregnant during their stay. If they did, they were forced to have an abortion. or faced deportation.

Following the fall of the Berlin Wall in November 1989 and German reunification in 1990, the population of guest workers still remaining in the former East Germany faced deportation, premature discontinuation of residence and work permits as well as open discrimination in the workplace. Of the 100,000 guest workers remaining in East Germany after reunification, about 75% left because of the rising tide of xenophobia in former East German territories. Vietnamese were not considered legal immigrants and lived in "grey area". Many started selling goods at the roadside. Ten years after the fall of the Berlin wall most Vietnamese were granted the right to reside however and many started opening little shops. Guest workers who stayed were not granted permanent residency until 1997.

After the reunification, Germany offered the guest workers US$2,000 and a ticket home if they left. The country of Vietnam did not accept the ones back who refused to accept the money, Germany considered them "illegal immigrants" after 1994. In 1995, Germany paid $140 million to the Vietnamese government and made a contract about repatriation which stated that repatriation could be forced if necessary. By 2004, 11,000 former Vietnamese guest workers had been repatriated, 8,000 of them against their will.

The descendants of the Vietnamese Gastarbeiter in East Germany caused what has been called the "Vietnamese miracle". As shown by a study while in the Berlin districts of Lichtenberg and Marzahn, where those of Vietnamese descent account for only 2% of the general population, but make up 17% of the university preparatory school population of those districts. According to the headmaster of the Barnim Gymnasium, for a university preparatory school (Gymnasium) that has a focus on the natural sciences, 30% of the school's freshmen come from Vietnamese families.

== Austria ==
On 28 December 1961, under the Raab-Olah agreement, Austria began a recruitment agreement with Spain, but compared to West Germany and Switzerland, the wage level in Austria was not attractive to many potential Spanish job-seekers. However, the agreements signed with Turkey (1963) and Yugoslavia (1966) were more successful, resulting in approximately 265,000 people migrating to Austria from these two countries between 1969 and 1973, until being halted by the early 1970s economic crisis. In 1973, 78.5% of guest workers in Austria came from Yugoslavia and 11.8% from Turkey.

== Group experiences with Gastarbeiterprogramm ==
A number of ethnic and religious groups had their immigration experiences shaped by guest worker programs to Germany.

=== Turks ===
Turkish immigration to Germany began en masse following the recruitment agreement between West Germany and Turkey. Many didn't come with the intention of staying in the country, and the West German government had no policy regarding them. Employment of Turkish workers was meant to be only for a limited period of time, and after two years, Turkish guest workers were expected to return to Turkey. Guest workers were originally not allowed to bring their families with them, but this changed in 1964, when they were allowed to stay for longer periods of time.

Policies that were then in-place regarding Turkish immigration were halted in 1973, when the West German government under Chancellor Willy Brandt decided to put an end to Turkish guest worker recruitment. Between the recruit agreement until it was halted, 2.7 million Turks applied for work in Germany, with only around 750,000 accepted. In 1982, Helmut Kohl indicated that the country would have a more strict policy on foreigners and a year later, his government passed a law providing financial incentives for Turkish residents to return to Turkey. Previously unseen documents discovered in 2013 revealed that Kohl had plans to halve the Turkish population of Germany as part of a broader debate on immigration policy. Several SPD politicians, such as former chancellor Helmut Schmidt and his chief of staff Hans-Jürgen Wischnewski, as well as Hesse Minister-President Holger Börner were also in favor of restricting migration of Turks, who by then made up the country's largest segment of Gastarbeiter.

== Legacy ==
The popular narrative surrounding foreign workers in West Germany was that they had come simply to make as much money as possible in a short amount of time, and had no interest in altering the political conditions of the country. However, foreign workers who were thought to be (and themselves thought as being) temporarily in West Germany eventually permanently settled down. Today, it is accepted that Germany's economic upheaval would not have been possible without the presence of Gastarbeiter.

Gastarbeiter, as a historical term however, referring to the guest worker programme and situation of the 1960s, is neutral and remains the most correct designation. In literary theory, some German migrant writers (e.g. Rafik Schami) use the terminology of "guest" and "host" provocatively.

=== Modern Germany ===
In September 2024, German Chancellor Olaf Scholz and Kenyan President William Ruto signed a controlled migration deal, allowing Kenyan workers to legally enter Germany. The deal aimed to address shortage of skilled laborers in Germany and difficulties providing work opportunities in Kenya, and includes provisions for Kenyan laborers who intend to extend their stay in the country. The agreement resulted in 250,000 workers being hired, including five bus drivers in a pilot project for the deal. In addition, the German government has already signed or is negotiating migration partnerships with Morocco, Nigeria, India, Colombia, Kyrgyzstan, Uzbekistan, Georgia and Moldova.

== In popular culture ==
The Serbian rock band Riblja Čorba have written two songs referring to Gastarbeiter, Gastarbejterska Pesma, released in 1996 and Gastarbejterska 2, released in 1999.

== Notable descendants of Gastarbeiter ==
- Özlem Türeci
- Uğur Şahin
- Aleksandar Rakić
- Fatih Akin
- Marko Arnautović
- Elyas M'Barek
- El Hedi ben Salem
- Akif Pirinçci
- Tarkan
- Oz
- Shindy
- Jaysus
- Nasser El Sonbaty
- Bruno Labbadia
- Robert Prosinečki
- Robert and Niko Kovač
- Kristijan Golubović
- Fredi Bobic
- Maurizio Gaudino
- Cédric Soares
- Mustafa Doğan
- İlkay Gündoğan
- Mesut Özil
- Kostas Mitroglou
- Antonis Remos
- Despina Vandi
- Melina Aslanidou
- Andromache (singer)
- Zera (musician)
- Mehmet Scholl
- Teoman
- Gonzalo Castro
- Mario Gómez
- Gabi Delgado-López
- Nino de Angelo
- Lou Bega
- Pietro Lombardi
- Sarah Lombardi
- Giovanni Zarrella
- Lars Castellucci
- Fabio De Masi
- Graciano Rocchigiani
- Franco Foda
- Nico Schulz
- Domenico Tedesco
- Cem Özdemir
- Hakan Çalhanoğlu

== See also ==
- Buffer theory
- Gastarbeiterroute
- Integration of immigrants
- Turks in Germany

== Bibliography ==
- Goeke, Simon (January 2014). "The Multinational Working Class? Political Activism and Labour Migration in West Germany During the 1960s and 1970s" (PDF). Journal of Contemporary History. 49 (1). Ludwig-Maximilians-Universität München: 160–182. doi:10.1177/0022009413505665. JSTOR 43697293 – via JSTOR.
- Surak, Kristin (8 January 2014). "Guestworkers: A Taxonomy". New Left Review (84): 84–102. eISSN 2044-0480. ISSN 0028-6060.
