= Ibrahim Sirkeci =

British academic

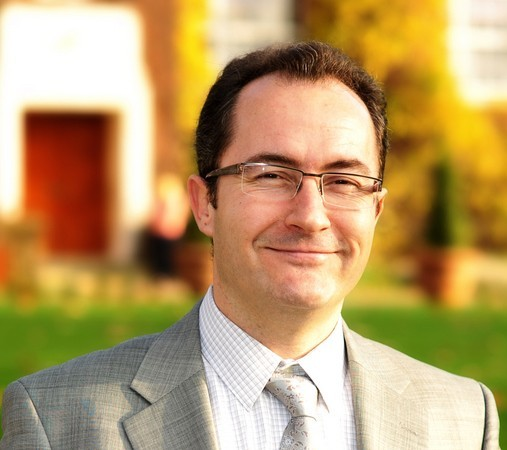
Ibrahim Sirkeci

Ibrahim Sirkeci (born 1972) is a British Turkish social scientist. He is currently the director of International Business School, Manchester, United Kingdom. Previously, he was the Head of Enterprise Subject Group at Salford Business School, University of Salford, Manchester. He served as a Professor at various British universities including his 16 years long service at the European Business School London, Regent's University London, and was the Director of Regent's Centre for Transnational Studies.

== Biography ==
Ibrahim Sirkeci was born in 1973 in İzmir, Turkey. He received his BA in Political Science and Public Administration from Bilkent University, Ankara and PhD in Human Geography from the University of Sheffield.

Sirkeci has an academic career spanning over two decades at various universities including the University of Salford, Manchester, UK He served at the European Business School London of Regent's University London from 2005 to 2021. He also worked as a Leverhulme Research Fellow at the Centre for the Study of Ethnicity and Citizenship, University of Bristol, and also as assistant professor at a private university in Ankara, Turkey.

Ibrahim Sirkeci is one of the founders of the Association of British Turkish Professionals, a non-profit community interest company.

He is the editor of several international peer-reviewed scholarly journals including Border Crossing, Transnational Education Review, Migration and Diversity, and Goc Dergisi. He authored several books including Cultures of Migration published by University of Texas Press in 2011, and The Environment of Insecurity in Turkey and the Emigration of Turkish Kurds to Germany, was published by Edwin Mellen Press in 2006.

== Work ==
Sirkeci's research focuses on human mobility, remittances, transnational marketing, marketing of higher education, transnational consumers, ethnicity, segmentation, segregation and labour markets, conflict, international migration with particular reference to minorities in the United Kingdom, Turkish, Kurdish migration to Germany, Turkey and Iraq.

He has written widely on transnational marketing, international migration, internal migration, population movements, labour market, segregation, ethnic conflict, minorities, Turks, Kurds, and remittances. Sirkeci also writes a weekly column for Turkish daily newspaper Birgun. His research is published in journals including Environment and Planning A, Sociological Research Online, Ethnic and Racial Studies, International Migration, Journal of Biosocial Science, and Population Review

== Bibliography ==
- Cohen, J. H., & Sirkeci, I. (Eds.). (2021). Handbook of Culture and Migration. Edward Elgar Publishing. ISBN 9781789903461
- Sirkeci, Ibrahim; Cohen, J. H.; Ratha, D. (2012). Migration and Remittances during the Global Financial Crisis and Beyond. Washington, DC, USA: The World Bank. p. 480. ISBN 978-0-8213-8826-6. Archived from the original on 13 May 2012.
- Sirkeci, Ibrahim (2013). Transnational Marketing and Transnational Consumers. Heidelberg, Germany: Springer. p. 72. ISBN 978-3-642-36774-8.
- Cohen, J. H.; Sirkeci, Ibrahim (2011). Cultures of Migration. Austin, Texas, USA: Texas University Press. p. 179. ISBN 978-0-292-72685-7.
- Milewski, Nadja; Sirkeci, Ibrahim; Yucesahin, M. M. (2015). Family and Human Capital in Turkish Migration. London, UK: Transnational Press London. p. 166. ISBN 978-1-910-78116-6.
- Sirkeci, Ibrahim; Elcin, Doga; Seker, Guven (2015). Politics and Law in Turkish Migration. London, UK: Transnational Press London. p. 202. ISBN 978-1-910-78102-9.
- Seker, B. Dilara; Sirkeci, Ibrahim; Yucesahin, M. Murat (2015). Göç ve Uyum. London, UK: Transnational Press London. p. 390. ISBN 978-1-910-78108-1.
- Sirkeci, Ibrahim (9 August 2009). "Freelonya'da Daltonlar Acilimi". Istanbul: BirGün Gazetesi. p. 5.
- Sirkeci, Ibrahim; Bára Magnúsdóttir, Lóa (29 March 2011). "Understanding illegal music downloading in the UK: a multi-attribute model". Journal of Research in Interactive Marketing. 5 (1): 90–110. doi:10.1108/17505931111121543.
- Ratha, Dilip; Sirkeci, Ibrahim (28 January 2014). "Editorial: Remittances and the global financial crisis". Migration Letters. 7 (2): 125–131. doi:10.33182/ml.v7i2.186.
- Johnston, Ron; Sirkeci, Ibrahim; Khattab, Nabil; Modood, Tariq (March 2010). "Ethno-Religious Categories and Measuring Occupational Attainment in Relation to Education in England and Wales: A Multilevel Analysis". Environment and Planning A: Economy and Space. 42 (3): 578–591. Bibcode:2010EnPlA..42..578J. doi:10.1068/a42180. S2CID 59581755.
- Sirkeci, Ibrahim (2006). The Environment of Insecurity in Turkey and the Emigration of Turkish Kurds to Germany. New York: Edwin Mellen Press. p. 332. ISBN 0-7734-5739-9.
- Sirkeci, Ibrahim (2005). Turkmen in Iraq and International Migration of Turkmen [Irak'tan Türkmen Göçleri ve Göç Eğilimleri]. Ankara: Global Strategy Institute. p. 88. ISBN 975-8975-02-1. (bilingual: English and Turkish).
- Icduygu, A (1998). Sirkeci, Ibrahim; Aydingün, I. (eds.). Türkiye'de Içgöç [Internal Migration in Turkey]. Istanbul: Tarih Vakfi Yayinlari. ISBN 975-7306-31-2.(in Turkish)

== See also ==
- British Turks
- List of British Turks
