= Plum Brandy =

Oil-on-canvas painting by Édouard Manet

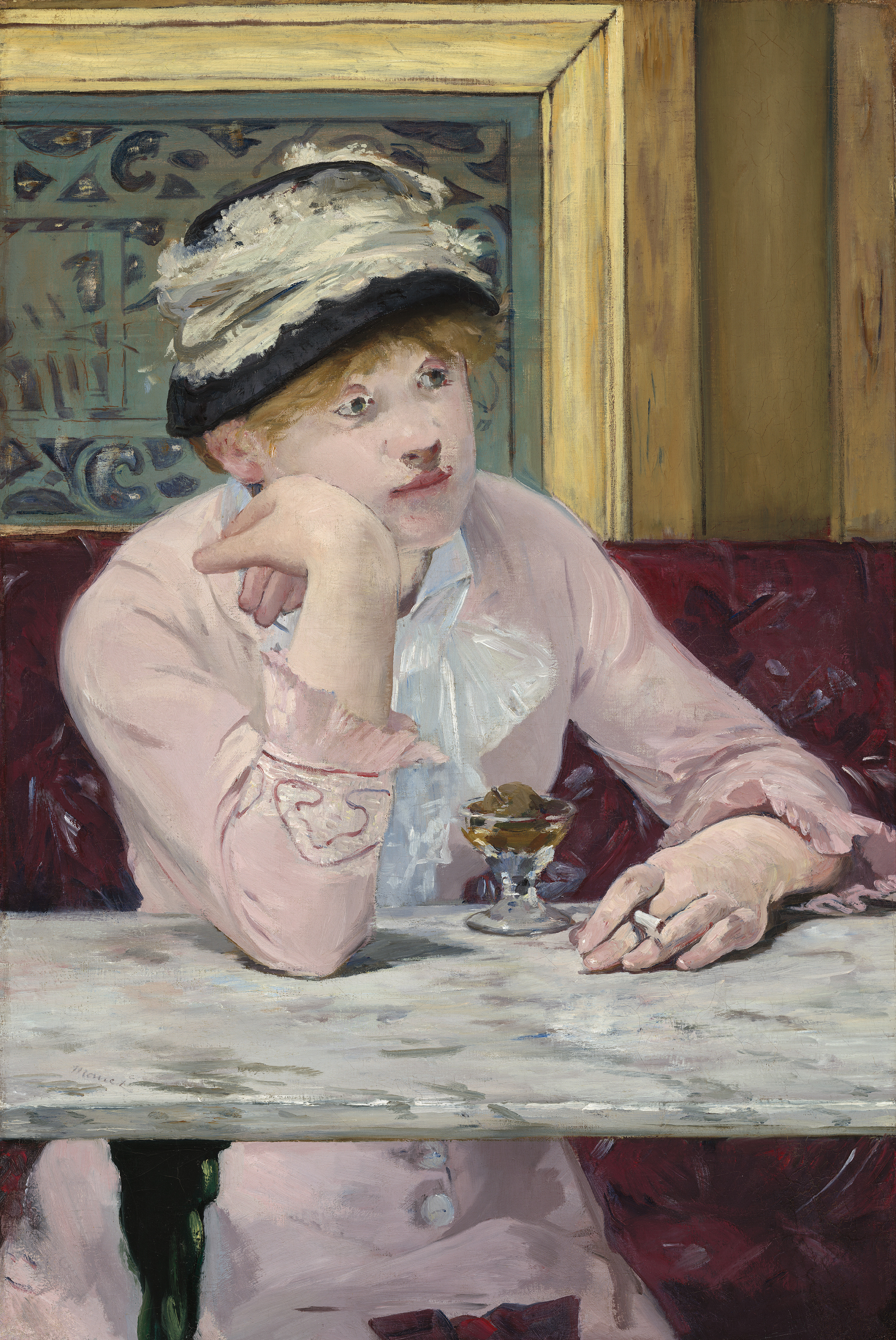
- Artist: Édouard Manet
- Year: circa 1877
- Medium: Oil on canvas
- Dimensions: 73.6 x 50.2 cm (29 x 19 3/4 in.)
- Location: National Gallery of Art, Washington, D.C.

Plum Brandy, also known as The Plum (French: La Prune), is an oil painting by Édouard Manet. It is undated but thought to have been painted about 1877. The painting measures 73.6 centimetres (29.0 in) by 50.2 centimetres (19.8 in). It depicts a woman seated alone at a table in a cafe, in a lethargic pose similar to that of the woman in Degas' L'Absinthe. The woman may be a prostitute, but unlike the subject of Degas' work she appears more dreamy than depressed. She holds an unlit cigarette and her plum soaked in brandy appears untouched.

Plum Brandy is exhibited in the National Gallery of Art, Washington, D.C.

== Analysis ==
The painting is a study in loneliness, depicting a quiet, almost melancholy, scene of a young working girl seated in a café. The subject is viewed from nearby, perhaps by another seated customer. She may be a prostitute waiting for a client, or possibly a shop worker hoping for some conversation. On the table is a plum soaked in brandy, a speciality of Parisian cafés at the time (originally painted as a glass of beer), which gives the painting its title. She leans forward, with her cheek resting on her right hand, and her right elbow on the marble tabletop, looking into the distance with a blank pensive look. Her left hand rests on the table holding an unlit cigarette. She wears a pink dress with embroidered cuffs, a white jabot, and a black hat trimmed with silk and lace. Her head is framed by the decorative grille behind her, above the red upholstered banquette on which she sits.

Manet may have based the painting on observations at the Café de la Nouvelle Athènes on the Place Pigalle in Paris. However, the background - the decorative grille and its gold frame - does not match other depictions of the café, and suggests the painting was made in Manet’s studio, where he is known to have had a café-style marble table on iron legs. Manet uses a simple style: for example, the plum in its glass and the fingers of the woman's left hand are created with just a few dabs of colour.

The model is the actress Ellen Andrée, who was also depicted with Marcellin Desboutin in the similar 1876 painting L'Absinthe (or In a Café) by Edgar Degas. The similarities between the two paintings suggest that Manet's The Plum may be a response to Degas's L'Absinthe. Degas's painting shows a bleak scene of despair blunted by absinthe; Manet's is a more hopeful scene, where there is the chance that the sitter's loneliness may be broken. Andrée also appears in Pierre-Auguste Renoir's 1881 painting Luncheon of the Boating Party. Edward Hopper's 1927 painting Automat has a similar theme.

== History ==
Manet sold the painting to collector Charles Deudon in about 1881. It was inherited by Deudon's wife on his death in 1914 and sold before 1919. It came into the collection of Arthur Sachs (1880–1975), the son of Samuel Sachs and a partner in Goldman Sachs for many years. It was then sold by M. Knoedler & Co to Paul Mellon in 1961, who donated it to the National Gallery of Art in Washington DC in 1971.

== Gallery ==
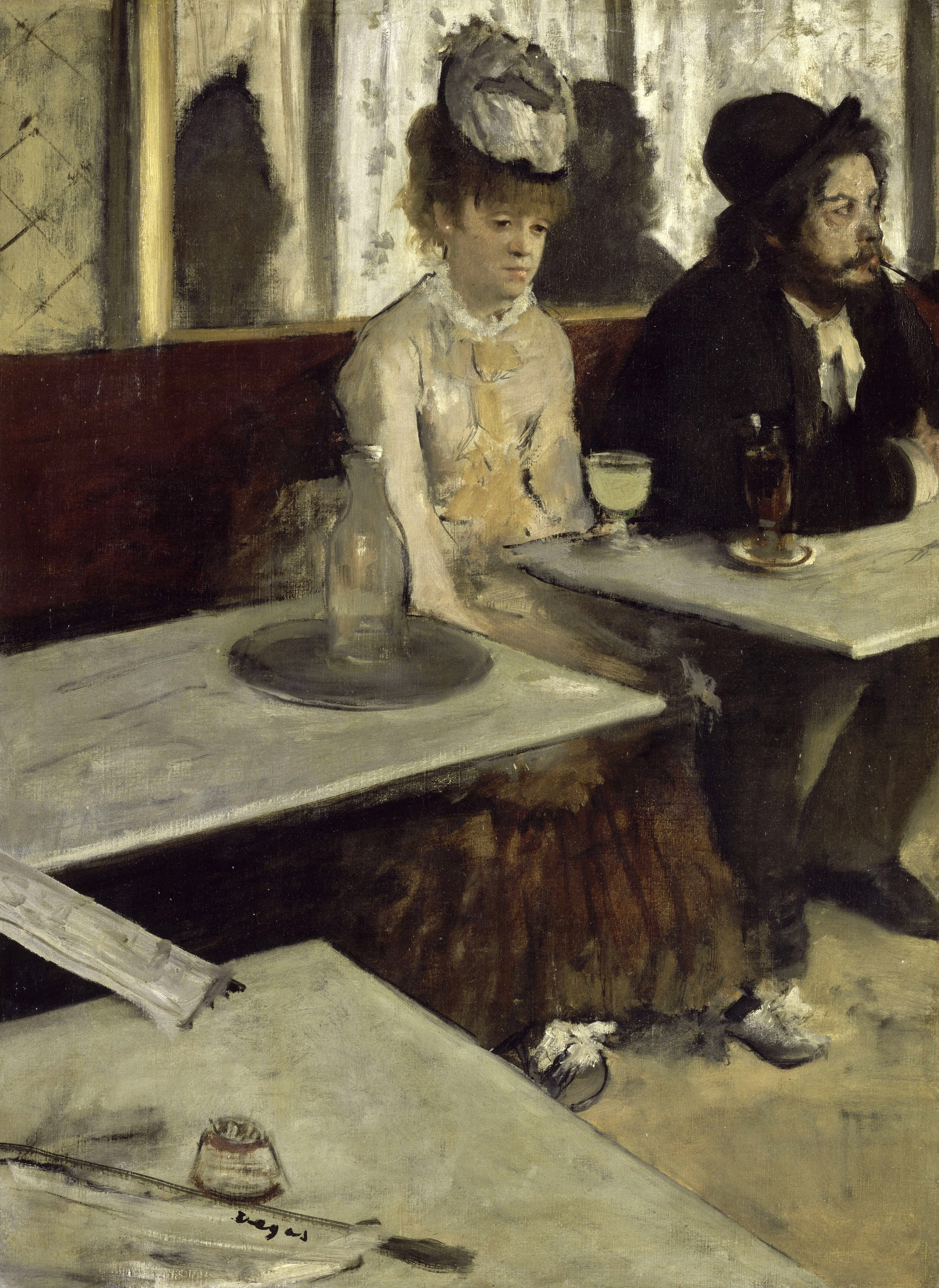
Degas, In a Café or L'Absinthe, 1876?

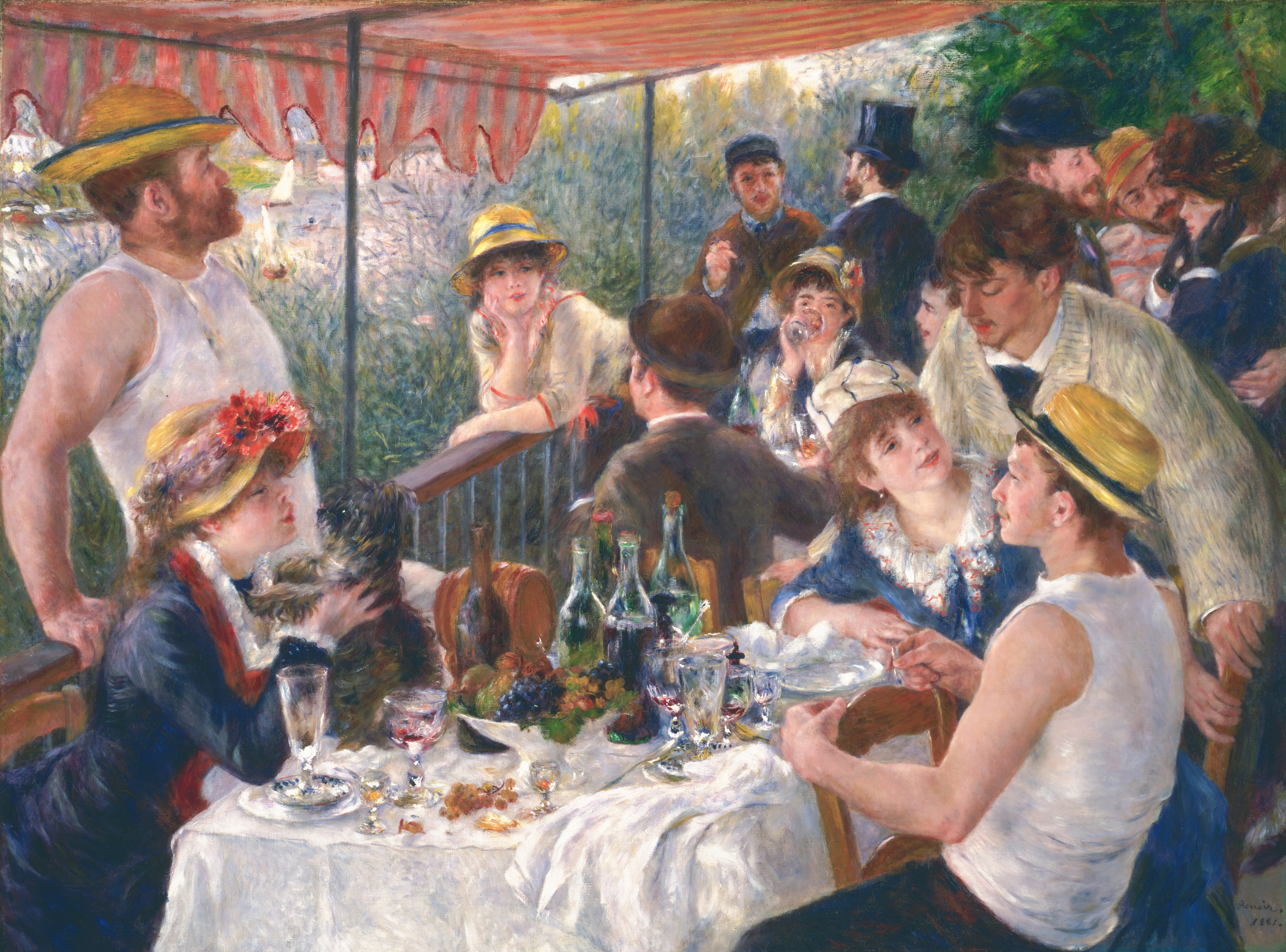
Auguste Renoir. Luncheon of the Boating Party, 1881

== See also ==
- List of paintings by Édouard Manet
- 1877 in art
