= Henri Cohen =

Henri Cohen may refer to:

- Henri Cohen (composer) (1808–1880), French music theorist and composer
- Henri Cohen (water polo) (died 1930), Belgian water polo athlete
- Henri Cohen (number theorist) (born 1947), French mathematician

== See also ==
- Henry Cohen (disambiguation)
