= Cultural references to absinthe =

The legacy of absinthe as a mysterious, addictive, and mind-altering drink continues to this day. Though its psychoactive effects and chemical makeup are contested, its cultural impact is not. Absinthe has played a notable role in the fine art movements of Impressionism, Post-Impressionism, Surrealism, Modernism, Cubism and in the corresponding literary movements. The legendary drink has more recently appeared in movies, video, television, music, and contemporary literature. The modern absinthe revival has had a notable effect on its portrayal. It is often shown as an unnaturally glowing green liquid demonstrating the influence of contemporary marketing efforts.

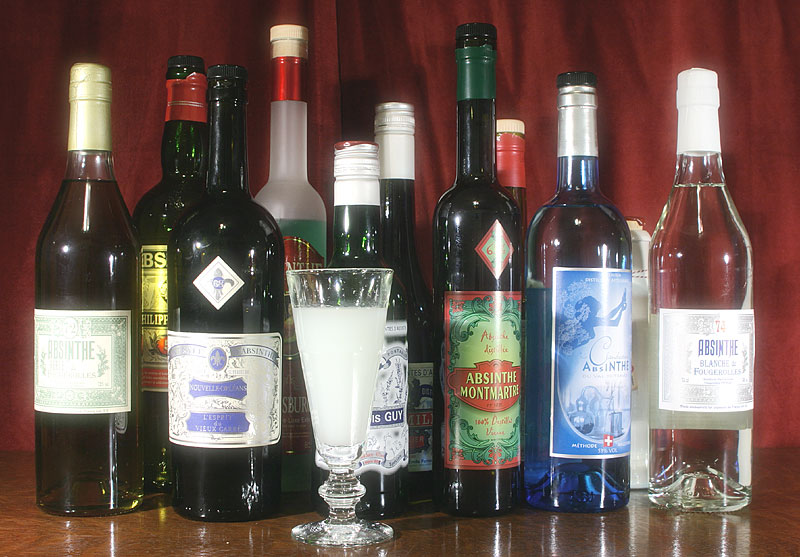
Absinthe-bottles

== Arts ==
Absinthe has a widely documented role in 19th-century visual art and was frequently the subject of many genre paintings and still lifes of the day.

- Edgar Degas' painting L'Absinthe (1876) portrayed grim absinthe drinkers in a cafe. Degas himself never called the painting "L'Absinthe"; it was either his art dealer or a later owner who gave it the name. Years later, it set off a flurry in the London art world, and the grim realism of "L'Absinthe" (a theme popular with bohemian artists) was perceived by London art critics as a lesson against alcohol and the French in general.
- Édouard Manet began his career with The Absinthe Drinker (1858), oil on canvas demonstrating that at least he was exposed to the drink and its effects.
- Henri de Toulouse-Lautrec was notorious for his consumption of the green muse. He often painted impressionistic scenes of the brothels and night spots of 19th-century Montmartre. Lautrec was even known to carry a hollow cane filled with absinthe during long nights out in Paris. An example of Lautrec's work featuring absinthe is in the painting At Grenelle, Absinthe Drinker.
- Paul Gauguin is known for consuming large quantities of absinthe, and his bold use of flat color has also been attributed to its influence.
- Paul Verlaine was addicted to absinthe in his last (alcoholic) period.
- Picasso depicted absinthe in various media, including the paintings Woman Drinking Absinthe (1901), Bottle of Pernod and Glass (1912), and the sculpture Absinthe Glass (1914).
- Vincent van Gogh drank large quantities of absinthe while creating his signature painting style. His ear removing episode is often attributed to overconsumption of absinthe as is his liberal use of the color yellow.
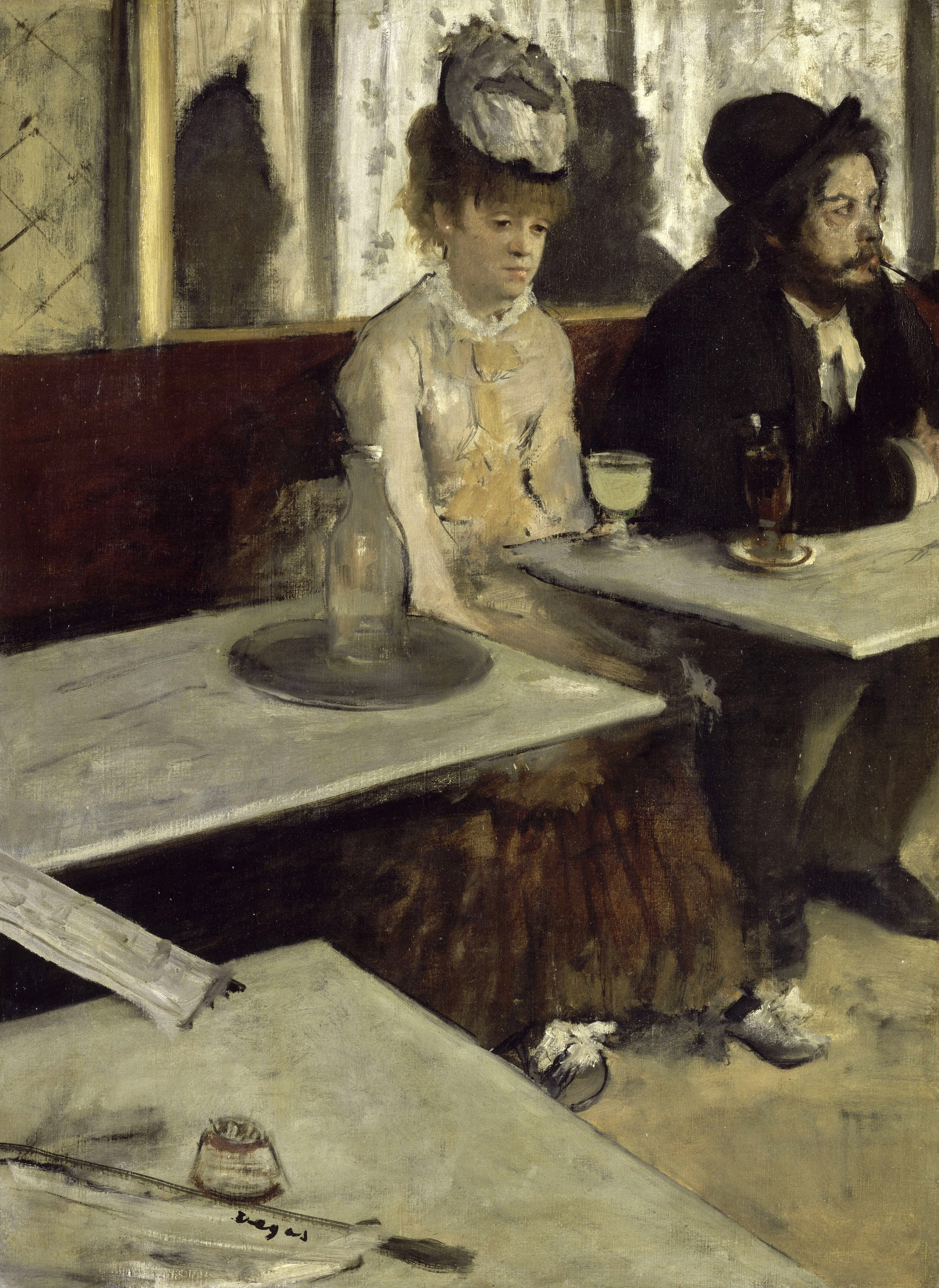
L'Absinthe, by Edgar Degas.

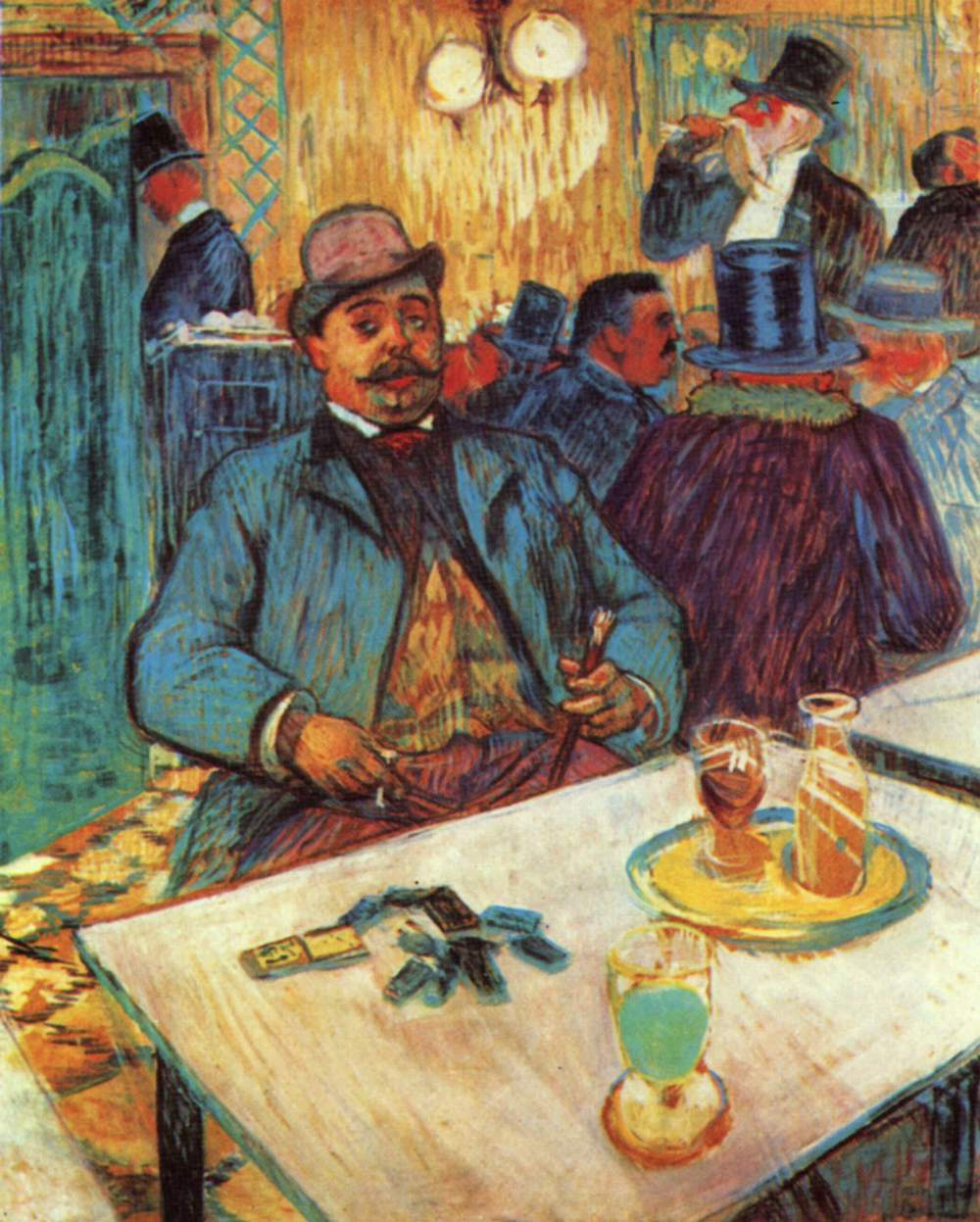
Monsieur Boileau au café, by Toulouse-Lautrec.

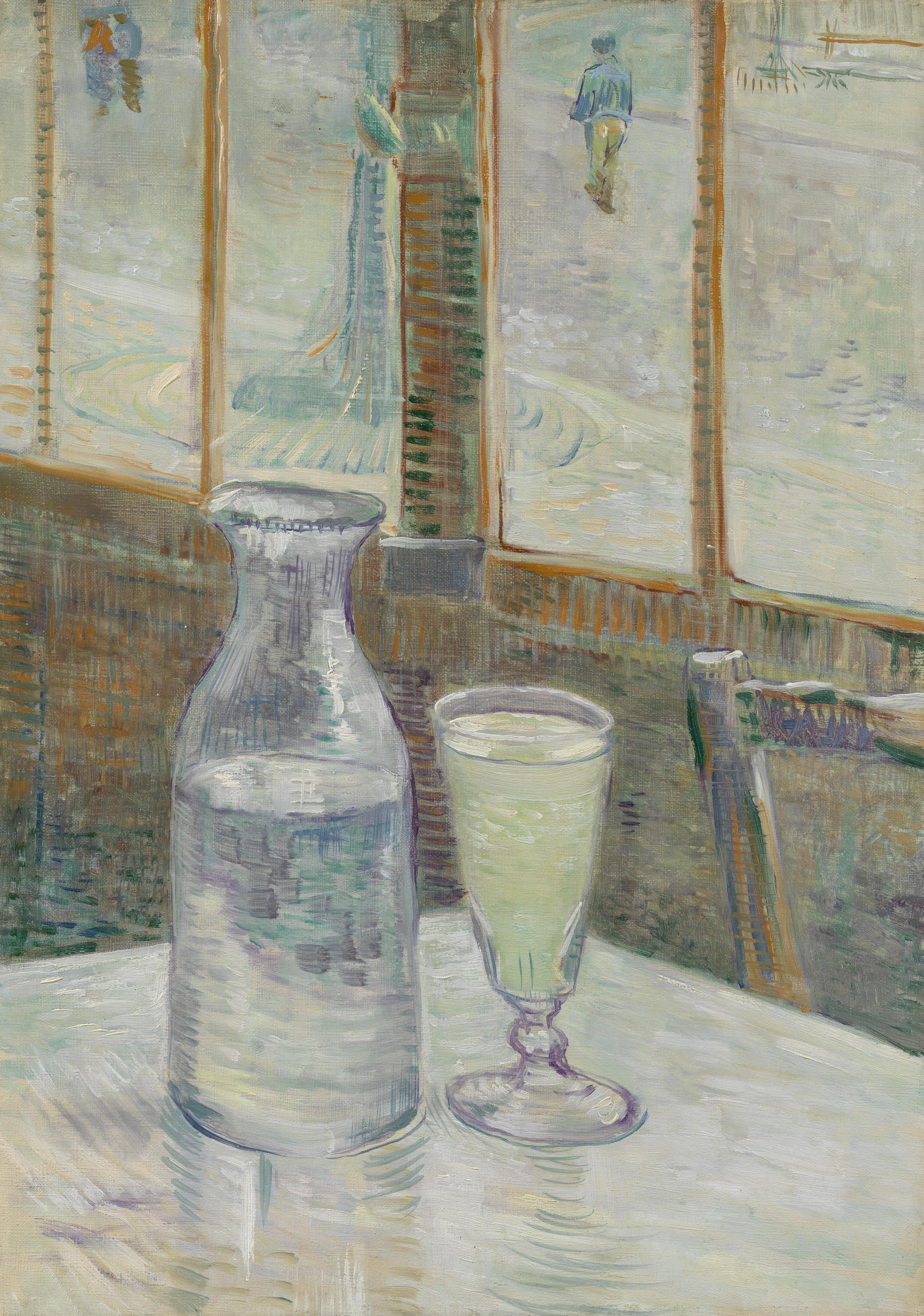
Still Life with Absinthe, 1887, Van Gogh Museum

Angel Fernández de Soto with absinthe by Picasso.

== Film ==
A 1914 silent film, Absinthe starred King Baggot as a Parisian artist who becomes addicted to absinthe and is driven to robbery and murder.

In the 1966 film Madame X, the film's star Lana Turner becomes addicted to absinthe whilst living in Mexico, one of the few countries in which absinthe was legal in the 20th century.

A number of films such as EuroTrip, Girls Trip, From Hell, Bram Stoker's Dracula and Moulin Rouge! have featured hallucination sequences after characters imbibe absinthe, in reference to the drink's mythical hallucinogenic properties. EuroTrip and Moulin Rouge! include personifications of the "green fairy" in these sequences, played by Steve Hytner and Kylie Minogue, respectively.

In the 2002 film Murder by Numbers, the film's two young antagonists (Ryan Gosling and Michael Pitt) prepare and consume absinthe while discussing the drink's notorious history.

== Literature ==
=== Classic literature ===
As prominent as absinthe's influence on visual art was, it is perhaps even more noteworthy in the context of 19th-century literature. Below is a short list of important authors who credited a portion of their literary success to the drink.

- Alfred Jarry is notably the author of the French absurdist play, Ubu Roi. Jarry claimed to use absinthe to "fuse together the dream and reality, art and lifestyle". The drink was purported by the author to be a key part of his creative process.
- Arthur Rimbaud was a young Parisian poet who was notably involved in a homosexual relationship with Paul Verlaine; they famously drank large quantities of absinthe together. Their relationship ended when Rimbaud was shot in the hand by Verlaine, who was then sentenced to prison. Later in life Rimbaud quit drinking absinthe and writing poetry and instead became involved in military exploits and gun running. He is still regarded as one of France's greatest poets.
- Baudelaire was an avid absinthe drinker. There is a possible allusion to the drink in his poem "Poison": “De tes yeux, de tes yeux verts,” etc.—the green eyes interpretably evoking la fée verte.
- Ernest Dowson was an important English poet who notably wrote a poem dedicated to absinthe called "Absinthia Taetra".
- Ernest Hemingway features absinthe in the short story "Hills Like White Elephants" (1927), and in For Whom the Bell Tolls (1940), disappointed with the quality of other liquor available, Robert Jordan turns to absinthe while fighting with the loyalist guerrillas. Hemingway himself was a frequent absinthe drinker and most likely procured his absinthe from Spain and Cuba after the ban.
- Guy de Maupassant was a naturalistic French author. He is generally considered one of the greatest French short story writers. In one famous work of prose, "A Queer Night in Paris", he describes the smells and sensations of absinthe in the streets of Paris and makes an overt reference to "the hour to take absinthe".
- Oscar Wilde was an avid absinthe consumer and often wrote about the drink in connection with the creative process. Wilde has been quoted as saying, "What difference is there between a glass of absinthe and a sunset?" and "After the first glass [of absinthe] you see things as you wish they were. After the second, you see things as they are not. Finally, you see things as they really are, and that is the most horrible thing in the world."
- Paul Marie Verlaine was a famous Parisian poet of the Bohemian style. Though he wrote extensively about the benefits of absinthe in his early years, he later claimed to have consorted with prostitutes and men while drinking it, and blamed the beverage for his downfalls. Even when he was on his deathbed, his friends were said to be hiding bottles for him under his pillow.
- Marie Corelli's Wormwood: A Drama of Paris (1890) was a popular novel about a Frenchman driven to murder and ruin after being introduced to absinthe. Corelli intended it as a morality tale on the dangers of the drink, with one contemporary scholar comparing it to the anti-drug propaganda film Reefer Madness. The book was speculated to have contributed to subsequent bans of absinthe in Europe and the United States.

=== Contemporary literature ===
- Dennis Wheatley included an absinthe session in his novel about the outbreak of the Great War in 1914, The Second Seal (1950). Wheatley was a wine merchant for many years, with a wide stock of spirits and liqueurs as well, and always put much information on the subject in his books. His hero the Duke de Richleau has been sent by British Intelligence on a mission to Vienna. He has to foil a plot by the Black Hand to disturb the peace of Europe, and so of course must concentrate his thoughts:

Instinctively he walked back across the Ring to Sachers. There he went up to his room, sat on his bed for a while, then rang for the waiter and ordered a double Absinthe. When it arrived, he added sugar and water and slowly drank the opal fluid. It had no more perceptible kick in it than lime juice, or a diluted paregoric cough mixture which it resembled in flavour, but he knew it had hidden properties which would act like a drug in clearing and accelerating his brain.

- In Gregory Maguire's 1995 parallel novel Wicked: The Life and Times of the Wicked Witch of the West, Elphaba is born with green skin due to her mother conceiving her with the Wizard, a man from late-19th century America, under the influence of a "green elixir" that gave her hallucinations - heavily implied to be absinthe.
- Absinthe figures heavily into the plot of the novel The Basic Eight (1999), by Daniel Handler, which features Bohemian characters who are drawn to absinthe by its dangerous history.
- An absinthe hallucination may or may not have inspired a murder in The Second Glass of Absinthe (2003), a mystery novel by Michelle Black, set in 1880 Leadville, Colorado.
- Asinthe lends the name to Kyell Gold's novel Green Fairy. The substance is the driving force in Dangerous Spirits, in which multiple protagonists make use of it to commune with spirits.
- Gemma Doyle, the main character of Libba Bray's 2007 sequel Rebel Angels (set in 1895), drinks absinthe with her friends at a Christmas ball and experiences hallucinatory effects.
- I Hope They Serve Beer in Hell (2006) contains a story in which the author, Tucker Max, experiences absinthe for the first time.
- The Absinthe Cloud (LePage/Dupuy #1, 2012) is a spy thriller by Timothy Everhart.
- The characters in Poppy Z. Brite's short story, "His Mouth Will Taste of Wormwood", discover a crate of absinthe, the consumption of which forms the backdrop against which their transgressive antics occur. The short story can be found in Swamp Foetus. Characters in her book Lost Souls also drink absinthe.
- The Douglas Preston and Lincoln Child character Aloysius Pendergast displays an affinity for absinthe in multiple novels.
- Absinthe is repeatedly mentioned in Andrei Gusev's story The Writer’s Wife Likes BDSM (2016).
- Absinthe is a key element in the central mystery of Jonathan Moore's 2016 novel The Poison Artist.
- Evan Rail's The Absinthe Forger (2024) is about the modern absinthe collector community and forgeries of pre-ban absinthe.

== Music ==
- Absynthe Minded is a Belgian rock band.
- Barbara (1930-1997) the popular French female singer wrote and composed, with Frédéric Botton, and sang "l Absinthe", a song published in her 12th album La Fleur d'amour (1972). This song is a love song, a bit sad and nostalgic -sadness is Barbara's trademark-, where the singer explains to a lover that drinking absinthe helps, at last to feel in love, to render love joyful, just like it helped Rimbaud and Verlaine to write their poetry (a recurrent comparison, all along the song).
- Blood Axis and Les Joyaux De La Princesse released a concept album called Absinthe: La Folie Verte.
- Dominic Miller has an album called "Absinthe" as an homage to French Impressionists.
- Kasabian recorded a song referred to and titled "La Fee Verte" on their fourth studio album Velociraptor!.
- Marilyn Manson has been an avid fan of absinthe since the recording of the Holy Wood (In the Shadow of the Valley of Death) album. He has also developed his own brand of the drink, entitled Mansinthe.
- Mayer Hawthorne has a song entitled "Green Eyed Love" on his first album A Strange Arrangement. Although the lyrics of the song seem to reflect on his relationship with a green-eyed girl, the music video puts the lyrics in a different light, where we can see Mayer Hawthorne unconventionally preparing a glass of absinthe and suffering from hallucinations afterwards.
- Music video for Frank Ocean's song "Pyramids" opens with a sequence of four shots of absinthe consumed by Frank Ocean.
- On Minus The Bear's 2002 debut album, Highly Refined Pirates, there is a track entitled "Absinthe Party At The Fly Honey Warehouse". It is one of their most popular tracks among fans.
- Patton Oswalt references absinthe on his comedy album Werewolves and Lollipops.
- Symphony X recorded a song called "Absinthe and Rue" on their first album, Symphony X.
- The band I Dont Know How but They Found Me has a song called "Absinthe", which includes the lyric "absinthe makes the heart grow fonder", a pun on the proverb "absence makes the heart grow fonder".
- The band Naked City has an album named "Absinthe".
- The British Extreme Metal band Cradle of Filth has a song entitled "Absinthe With Faust" on their album Nymphetamine.
- The Damned recorded a song titled "Absinthe" on their album Grave Disorder which was released in 2001. It sampled the line Gary Oldman spoke in the film Dracula referring to the green fairy.
- The Ghost song "Spirit" from the album Meliora directly references absinthe. Lyrics include "your green muse".
- The Nine Inch Nails video for "The Perfect Drug" casts Trent Reznor as a grieving father who drinks absinthe as an escape.
- Mezzo-soprano and absinthe content creator Adrienne LaVey released her debut single about absinthe in 2023, “Goddess in a Glass” with a remix by the darkwave band Male Tears.
- The Blue Stars Drum and Bugle Corps 2023 production, "In Absintheia," depicts the transformative effects of absinthe as a source of inspiration and clarity. The show's props also depict the traditional method of preparing the drink, including multiple massive sugar cubes, spoons, and straws.

== Television ==
- Absinthe makes an appearance on Anthony Bourdain's Anthony Bourdain: No Reservations during the 2005 pilot episode, "Why the French Don't Suck", in which he visits France. The distilling process is discussed, and he drinks some "real" vintage absinthe.
- Absinthe played a prominent role in HBO's cable television series Carnivàle. The drink is frequently consumed by the mysterious blind seer Professor Lodz (played by Patrick Bauchau) in the television series.
- Betty Williams of Coronation Street starting drinking absinthe in one episode. The drink was also featured in rival British soap opera Emmerdale.
- Bob's indulgence of absinthe is the focus of the Bob's Burgers episode "An Indecent Thanksgiving Proposal."
- During a speed bump task on episode 11 of Season 15 on The Amazing Race, Brian & Ericka had to make a shot of absinthe and drink it before receiving their next clue.
- Evil immortal Christoph Kuyler from the television series Highlander: The Series episode "For Evil's Sake". is addicted to absinthe.
- In "The Big Lockout" episode of this UK comedy series Black Books, the character Manny finds himself locked in his shop and proceeds to drink an entire bottle of absinthe as a substitute for water. In the episode he expects to go crazy, but ultimately just ends up with a bad hangover. Bernard also refers to it as "the drink that makes you want to kill yourself instantly."
- In American Horror Story: Hotel episode some characters drinks absinthe.
- In episode 11 of the fourth Gossip Girl season, Serena van der Woodsen is shown preparing, and then drinking absinthe in a boarding school flashback.
- In episode 4 of the second series of The IT Crowd, the goth character Richmond states, at a dinner party, that he only drinks absinthe. However upon hearing that none is available he says that Carlsberg is fine.
- In Geordie Shore season 5, Charlotte and Scott stop at an absinthe bar.
- In Mad Men episode s1.e12 ("Nixon vs. Kennedy"), Paul Kinsey tells his colleagues and the admins who have gathered for an afterwork election night party at Sterling Cooper he has a bottle of absinthe in his office, and drinking it makes him incantato. Ken Cosgrove and a secretary later search Kinsey's office for the absinthe, but don't find it.
- In the CSI: NY episode "Some Buried Bones", the victim who is leaving a secret society at Hudson University, returns his absinthe spoon as part of the de-initiation rite. The spoon is later found with the victim.
- In the episode "Dough" of the British comedy series Bottom, when Eddie is getting the drinks in, he asks Richie what he wants. Unable to make his mind up, Richie asks for a pint of absinthe. The bartender responds that there's a gay pub down the road if he wants to go there. Later on, when they all take the first drink, Richie drinks a large amount, then spits it out declaring, "This is shit!"
- In the episode "The Perfect Cocktail" of How I Met Your Mother, Lily mentions that when Robin drinks absinthe she hallucinates that she is floating.
- On an episode of the GSN series Late Night Liars, host Larry Miller was shown introducing Weasel to absinthe, commenting on its illegality and supposedly hallucinogenic nature. After just one sip, Weasel claimed that his bow tie was trying to "strangulate" him.
- On the 4th of May 2012 episode of Eastenders, Derek obtains many boxes of Absinthe and then hires Tyler Moon and Billy Mitchell to distribute around Albert Square. Later on during the episode, following an argument with her family, Lauren shows her friends Whitney and Lucy a bottle of Absinthe (which she had earlier purchased) from her bag and opens it, from here the episode ends on another cliffhanger.
- The Fine Living Channel's flagship The Thirsty Traveler reality TV series dedicated an entire episode to absinthe in 2004. The host traveled to several distilleries in different countries and observed the process and flavors of contemporary absinthe.
- The episode of New Girl "Cabin" involves characters drinking a bottle of absinthe while staying at a cabin.
- The episode of The Simpsons "The War of Art" features a parody version of absinthe made from capers called "strupo."

== Theatre ==
- Absinthe is an absinthe-themed live show in Las Vegas.

== Visual novel ==
- In the visual novel Umineko no Naku Koro ni, the absinthe is Kinzo's preferred drink. It was implied that it may have drove him to madness due to its alleged hallucinogenic properties.

== Radio ==
- Washington D.C.–based Don and Mike Show has a biannual tradition of doing an entire four-hour show while drinking absinthe, complete with audience participation, interviews, and a news segment.
