= Henry Cohen =

Henry Cohen may refer to:

- Sir Henry Bolton Basten né Cohen (1903–1992), British civil servant and university vice-chancellor
- Henri/Henry Cohen (numismatist) (1806–1880), French numismatist, bibliographer and composer
- Henry Cohen (rabbi) (1863–1952), Jewish Texan rabbi in Galveston, Texas, 1888–1952
- Henry Cohen (politician) (1872–1942), Australian politician
- Henry Cohen, 1st Baron Cohen of Birkenhead (1900–1977), British physician, doctor and lecturer
- Henry Cohen (civil servant) (1922–1999), director of the third largest Displaced Persons camp in the American sector of post-WWII Germany in 1946
- Henry Cohen (judge) (1840–1912), judge and politician in New South Wales, Australia.
- Henry Cohen Engelman (b. 1954), Uruguayan gastroenterologist

== See also ==
- Henri Cohen (disambiguation)
- Harry Cohen (disambiguation)
- Henry Cohn
- Henri Cohen actor
