= Harold Cohen =

Harold Cohen may refer to:

- Harold Cohen (politician) (1881–1946), Australian politician and brigadier
- Harold Cohen (artist) (1928–2016), British-born American-based artist
- Harold Cohen (soldier) (1916–2006), United States Army officer
- Harold Cohen Library, University of Liverpool's library

== See also ==
- Harry Cohen (disambiguation)
