= Automat (Hopper) =

1927 painting by Edward Hopper

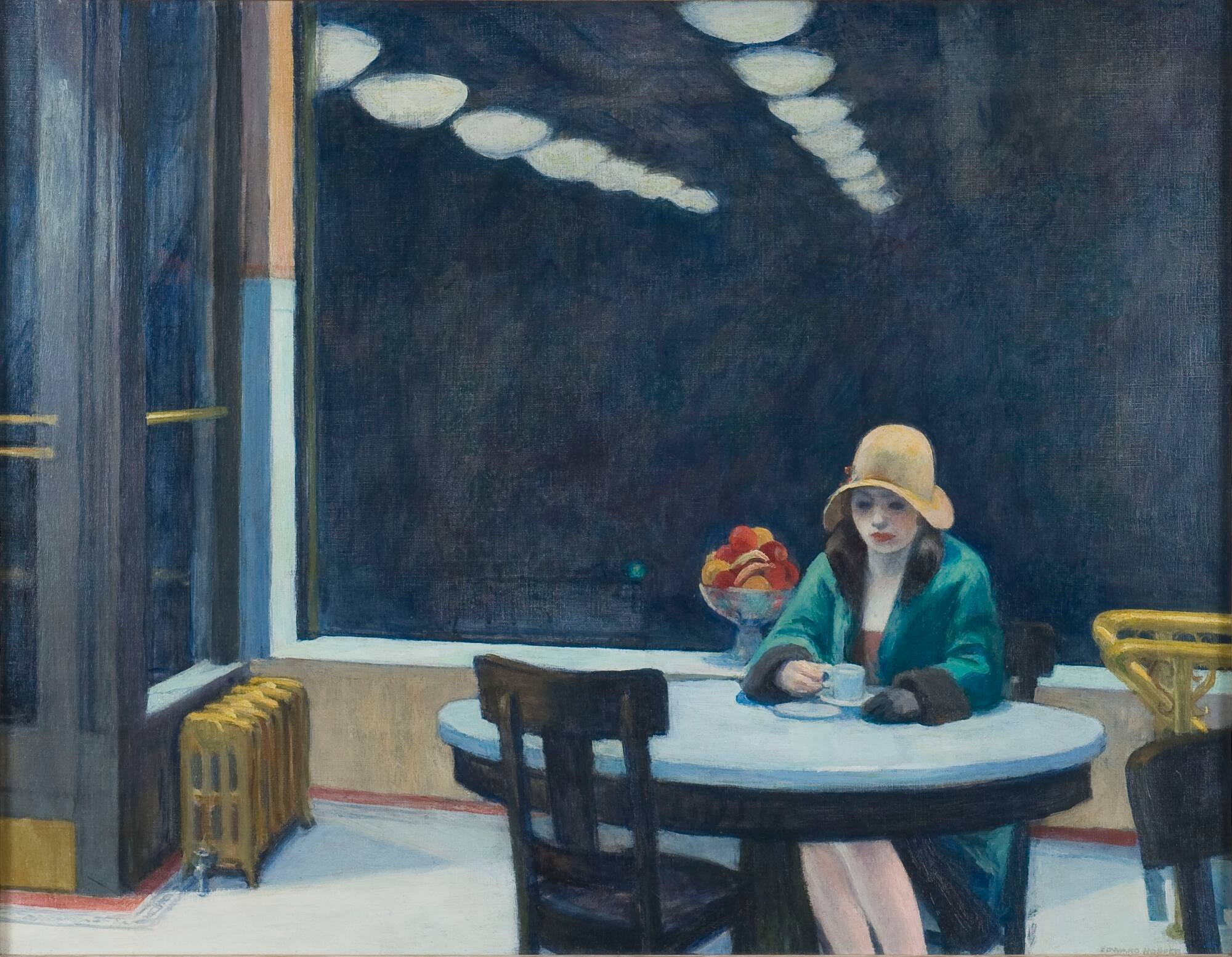
- Artist: Edward Hopper
- Year: 1927
- Medium: Oil on canvas
- Dimensions: 71.4 cm × 91.4 cm (28 in × 36 in)
- Location: Des Moines Art Center, Des Moines

Automat is a 1927 oil painting by the American realist painter Edward Hopper. The painting was first displayed on Valentine's Day 1927 at the opening of Hopper's second solo show, at the Rehn Galleries in New York City. By April it had been sold for $1,200 ($22,241 in 2025 dollars). The painting is today owned by the Des Moines Art Center, in Iowa.

== The woman ==
The painting portrays a lone woman staring into a cup of coffee in an automat at night. The reflection of identical rows of light fixtures stretches out through the night-blackened window.

Hopper's wife, Jo, served as the model for the woman. However, Hopper altered her face to make her younger (Jo was 44 in 1927). He also altered her figure; Jo was a curvy, full-figured woman, while one critic has described the woman in the painting as "'boyish' (that is, flat-chested)".

As is often the case in Hopper's paintings, both the woman's circumstances and her mood are ambiguous. She is well-dressed and is wearing makeup, which could indicate either that she is on her way to or from work at a job where personal appearance is important, or that she is on her way to or from a social occasion.

She has removed only one glove, which may indicate either that she is distracted, that she is in a hurry and can stop only for a moment, or simply that she has just come in from outside, and has not yet warmed up. But the latter possibility seems unlikely, for there is a small empty plate on the table, in front of her cup and saucer, suggesting that she may have eaten a snack and been sitting at this spot for some time.

The time of year—late autumn or winter—is evident from the fact that the woman is warmly dressed. But the time of day is unclear, since days are short at this time of year. It is possible, for example, that it is just after sunset, and early enough in the evening that the automat could be the spot at which she has arranged to rendezvous with a friend. Or it could be late at night, after the woman has completed a shift at work. Or again, it could be early in the morning, before sunrise, as a shift is about to start.

Whatever the hour, the restaurant appears to be largely empty and there are no signs of activity (or of any life at all) on the street outside. This adds to the sense of loneliness, and has caused the painting to be popularly associated with the concept of urban alienation. One critic has observed that, in a pose typical of Hopper's melancholic subjects, "the woman's eyes are downcast and her thoughts turned inward." Another critic has described her as "gazing at her coffee cup as if it were the last thing in the world she could hold on to." In 1995, Time magazine used Automat as the cover image for a story about stress and depression in the 20th century.

Art critic Ivo Kranzfelder compares the subject matter of this painting (a young woman nursing a drink alone in a restaurant) to Édouard Manet's The Plum and Edgar Degas's L'Absinthe.

== The viewer’s perspective ==
The presence of a chairback in the lower right-hand corner of the canvas suggests that the viewer is sitting at a nearby table, from which vantage-point a stranger might be able to glance, uninvited, upon the woman.

In an innovative twist, Hopper made the woman's legs the brightest spot in the painting, thereby "turning her into an object of desire" and "making the viewer a voyeur." By today's standards this description seems overstated, but in 1927 the public display of women's legs was still a relatively novel phenomenon.

Hopper would make the crossed legs of a female subject the brightest spot on an otherwise dark canvas in a number of later paintings, including Compartment C, Car 293 (1938) and Hotel Lobby (1943).

== The restaurant ==
As critic Carol Troyen notes, "the title, rather than any detail within the picture, is what identifies the restaurant as an automat." Troyen continues on, however, to note a number of features which would have made the restaurant identifiable to a New Yorker of the 1920s: "They were clean, efficient, well-lit and—typically furnished with round Carrera marble tables and solid oak chairs like those shown here—genteel. By the time Hopper painted his picture, automats had begun to be promoted as safe and proper places for the working woman to dine alone." To a New Yorker of the 1920s, Hopper's interior would have been instantly recognizable as an Automat. A 1912 photograph of the Automat in Times Square reveals every detail of the chairs and the marble-topped tables to correspond with what Hopper has painted. However, this is not the Times Square Automat; the ceiling lights at that location were significantly more ornate than the ones in the painting.

Automats, which were open at all hours of the day, were also “busy, noisy and anonymous. They served more than ten thousand customers a day." The woman is sitting in a spot in the restaurant. She has, as Troyen notes, the table nearest the door, and behind her, on her other side, is the staircase to the restaurant's below-ground level. Even if the restaurant were relatively empty, there would have been foot-traffic past her table. Thus, "the figure’s quiet, contemplative air," which is "out of step with the city’s energy, its pace and its mechanized rhythm," is made noteworthy by the busy spot in which she has chosen to sit.

== The window ==
Hopper's paintings are frequently built around a vignette that unfolds as the viewer gazes into a window, or out through a window. Sometimes, as in Railroad Sunset (1929), Nighthawks (1942) and Office in a Small City (1953), it is still possible to see details of the scene beyond even after Hopper has guided the viewer's gaze through two panes of glass. When Hopper wishes to obscure the view, he tends to position the window at a sharp angle to the viewer's vantage-point, or to block the view with curtains or blinds. Another favourite technique—used, for example, in Conference at Night (1949)—is to use bright light, flooding in from the exterior at a sharp angle from the sun or from an unseen streetlight, to illuminate a few mundane details within inches of the far side of the window, thereby throwing the deeper reaches of the view into shadow.

By way of comparison, in Automat the window dominates the painting, and yet "allows nothing of the street, or whatever else is outside, to be seen." The complete blackness outside is a departure both from Hopper's usual techniques, and from realism, since a New York street at night is full of light from cars and street lamps. This complete emptiness allows the reflections from the interior to stand out more dramatically, and intensifies the viewer's focus upon the woman.

The window conveys an impressionistic view, rather than one that is realistic, in another way. As Mark Strand notes, "The window reflects only the twin receding rows of ceiling lights and nothing else of the automat interior." It is possible that Hopper omitted these reflections in order to avoid distractions that might turn the viewer's away from the woman. Strand, however, suggests an alternative reason why the woman's reflection is omitted:

The painting suggests several things, but the most obvious and most resonant is that if what the window reflects is true then the scene takes place in limbo and the seated woman is an illusion. This is a troubling idea. And if the woman thinks of herself in this context, she cannot possibly be happy. But of course she does not think, she is the product of another will, an illusion, an invention of Hopper’s.

The focusing effect of the blank window behind the woman can be seen most clearly when it is contrasted with Sunlight in a Cafeteria (1958), one of Hopper's late paintings. In that painting, a female and a male subject sit in an otherwise empty cafeteria in spots reminiscent of the tables occupied, respectively, by the female subject and the viewer in Automat. Even the bowl of fruit on the windowsill in Automat has its parallel in a small potted plant on the windowsill in Sunlight in a Cafeteria. But in Sunlight in a Cafeteria, the well-illuminated street scene outside the large window seemingly distracts the man's attention from his counterpart, so that the two subjects "do not seem to be acting in the same scene, as it were." By contrast, in Automat the viewer is fully engaged by the presence of the woman.
