= Marguerite Baux =

French operatic soprano

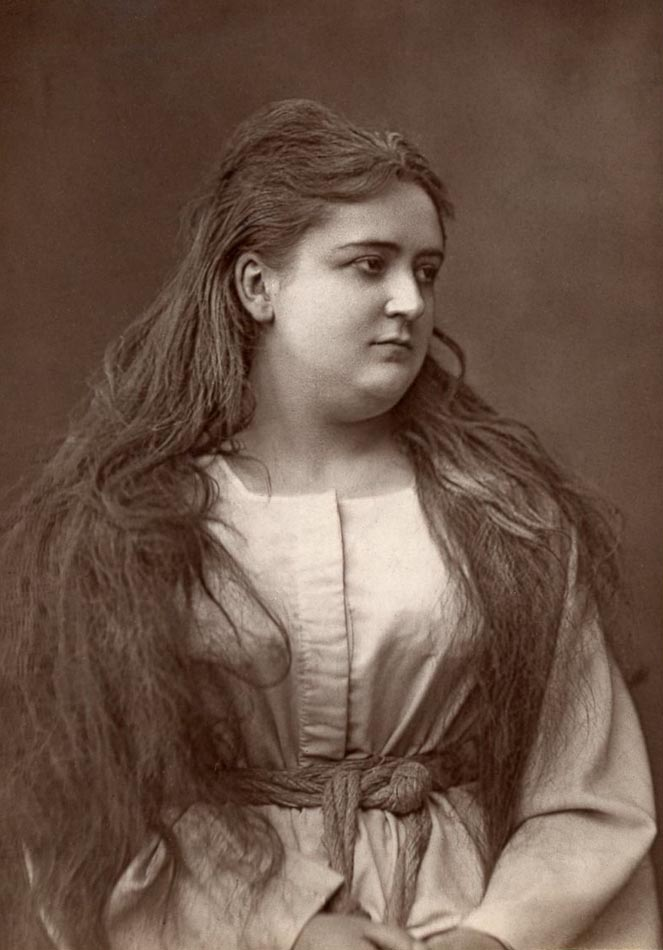
Marguerite Baux in Faust (1877)

Marguerite Baux (1856-?) was a French operatic soprano who performed at the Paris Opera in the 1870s after making her début in February 1876 as Rachel in Fromental Halévy's La Juive. She went on to perform in various provincial opera houses as well as in Italy.

== Biography ==
Born in Marseille, Marguerite Baux was the daughter of Jean Elysée Baux (1798–1865), mayor of Marseille in 1848, and Rosalie Eudoxie Arnaud (1814–1884). She was recognized for her fine voice while she was still young but had not intended to sing professionally. It was only after her father lost his fortune after the events of 1870 that she went to Paris to start her career. On the advice of her singing tutor, Henri Cohen, she made her début in February 1876 as Rachel in La Juive, although initially she had been expected to sing Marguerite in Gounod's Faust

At the Paris Opera, she took the role of Agathe in Der Freischütz (1876), Berthe in le Prophète (1876), Elvire in Don Juan (1876), Sita in le Roi de Lahore (1877) and Alice in Robert le diable (1877).

Baux went on to sing in Lyon and later in Rouen where she played Alice in Robert le diable and Francesca in Françoise de Rimini at the Théâtre des Arts in 1884. In 1888, she was engaged by Ferdinand Straskoch to sing in Triest and Rome.
