= L'Absinthe =

Painting by Edgar Degas

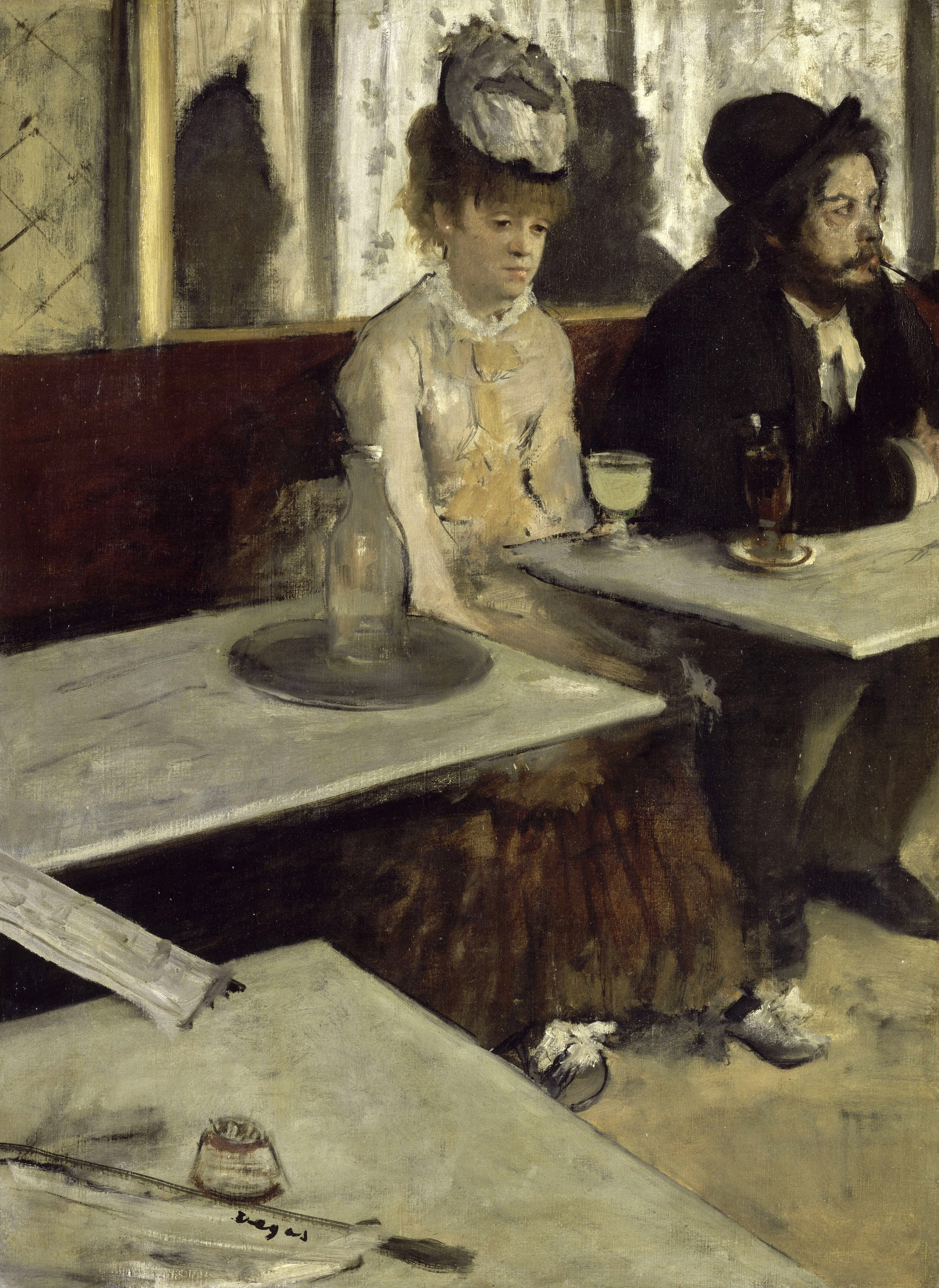
- Artist: Edgar Degas
- Year: 1875–76
- Medium: Oil on canvas
- Dimensions: 92 cm × 68 cm (36 in × 26.8 in)
- Location: Musée d'Orsay, Paris

L'Absinthe (English: The Absinthe Drinker or Glass of Absinthe) is a painting by Edgar Degas, painted between 1875 and 1876. Its original title was Dans un Café, a name often used today.

Other early titles were A sketch of a French Café and Figures at Café. Then, when exhibited in London in 1893, the title was changed to L'Absinthe, the name by which the painting is now commonly known. It is in the permanent collection of the Musée d'Orsay in Paris.

== Description ==
Painted in 1875–76, the work portrays a woman and man sitting side by side, the woman drinking a glass of absinthe. They appear lethargic and lonely. The man, wearing a hat, looks to the right off the edge of the canvas, while the woman, dressed more formally in fashionable dress and hat, stares vacantly downward. A glass filled with absinthe is on the table in front of her. The models used in the painting are Ellen Andrée, an actress who also appeared in Édouard Manet's paintings Chez le père Lathuille and Plum Brandy, and Marcellin Desboutin, a painter and etcher. The café where they are taking their refreshment is the Café de la Nouvelle-Athènes in Paris.

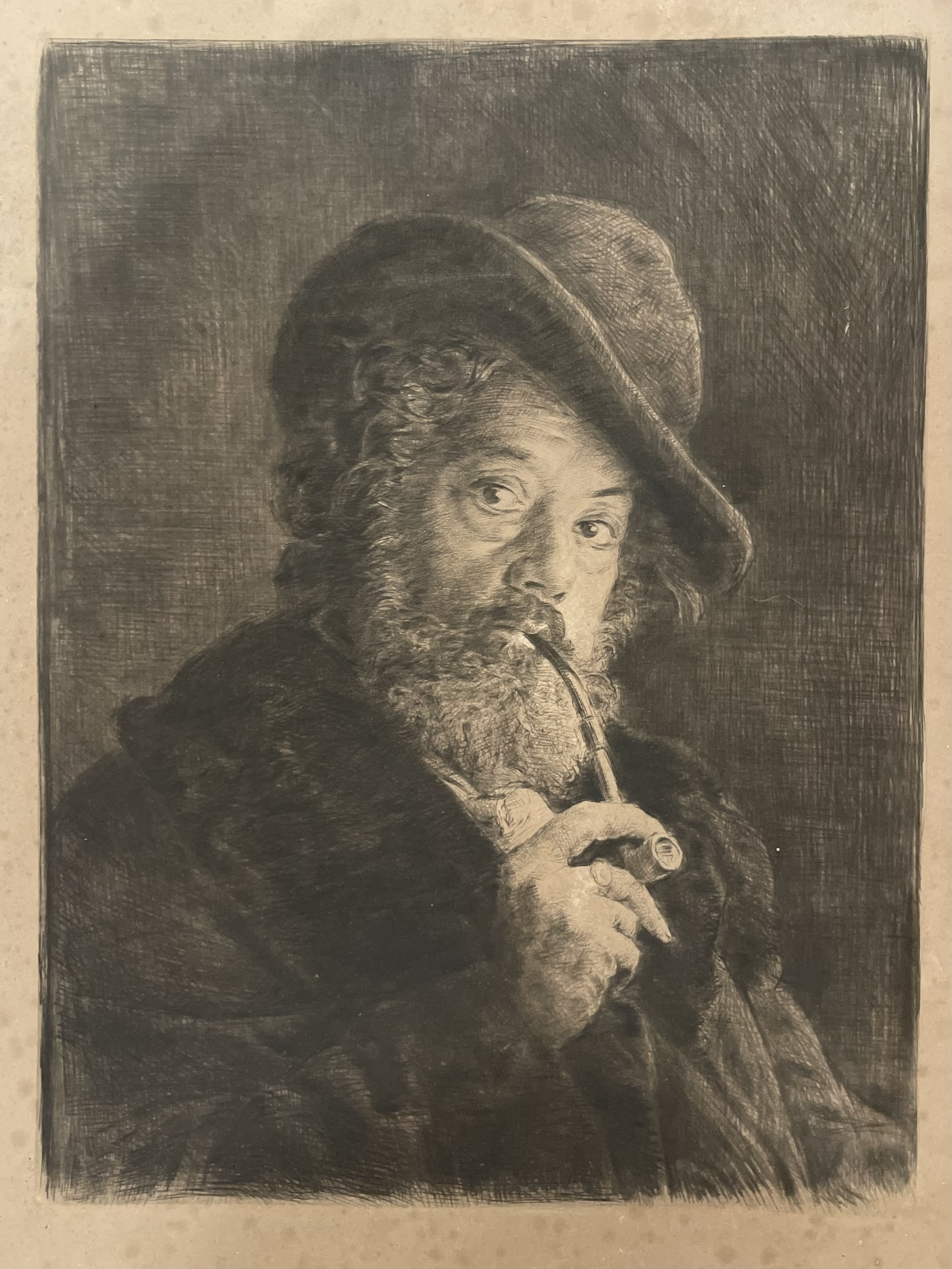
Debonair friend of Degas self portrait in pencil with cafe attire

== Reception ==
At its first showing in 1876, the picture was panned by critics, who called it ugly and disgusting. It was seen at the third Impressionist exhibition in 1877, but not again until it appeared at auction in 1892, when it was again treated with derision. The painting was shown again at the Grafton Gallery in England in 1893, this time entitled L'Absinthe, where it sparked even greater controversy. The people and the absinthe represented in the painting were considered by English critics to be shockingly degraded and uncouth.

Many regarded the painting as a blow to morality; this was the general view of such Victorians as Sir William Blake Richmond and Walter Crane when shown the painting in London. That reaction was typical of the age, revealing the deep suspicion with which Victorian England had regarded art in France since the early days of the Barbizon School, and the desire to find a morally uplifting lesson in works of art. Many English critics viewed the picture as a warning lesson against absinthe, and the French in general. The comment by George Moore on the woman depicted was: "What a whore!" He added, "the tale is not a pleasant one, but it is a lesson". However, in his book Modern Painting, Moore regretted assigning a moral lesson to the work, claiming that "the picture is merely a work of art, and has nothing to do with drink or sociology."

Despite all this, the painting was originally owned in Britain: it was bought in 1876 from the London gallery of dealer Charles Deschamps by Brighton collector Captain Henry Hill. Following his death, it was bought at the February 1892 London auction by Scottish dealer Alexander Reid for his client Arthur Kay, who was, however, ambivalent about the painting and sold it in April 1893 to a Paris dealer.

== See also ==
- Cultural references to absinthe
- Automat, similar subject
- Plum Brandy, similar subject
