= Harry Cohen (disambiguation) =

Harry Cohen (born 1949) is a British Labour Party politician.

Harry Cohen may also refer to:

- birth name of Harry Kane (hurdler) (born 1933), British hurdler
- Harry Cohen (died. c. 1905), founder of The Rand Daily Mail South African newspaper in 1902
- Harry Cohen (1901–1952), American early 1930s film producer - see Forging Ahead (1933)
- Harry Cohen, nominated with others for several Primetime Emmy Awards for Outstanding Sound Editing for a Limited or Anthology Series, Movie or Special and for a Comedy or Drama Series (One-Hour), as well as various Golden Reel Awards for Outstanding Achievement in Sound Editing
- Dr. Harry Cohen, made a Member of the Order of Australia - see 1995 Australia Day Honours - for contributions to medicine
- Harry Cohen, athletic trainer (1946–1958) for the Boston Celtics basketball team

== See also ==
- Henry Cohen (disambiguation)
- Harold Cohen (disambiguation)
- Harry Cohn (1891–1958), American president and production director of Columbia Pictures
