= La Nouvelle Athènes =

Café in Paris

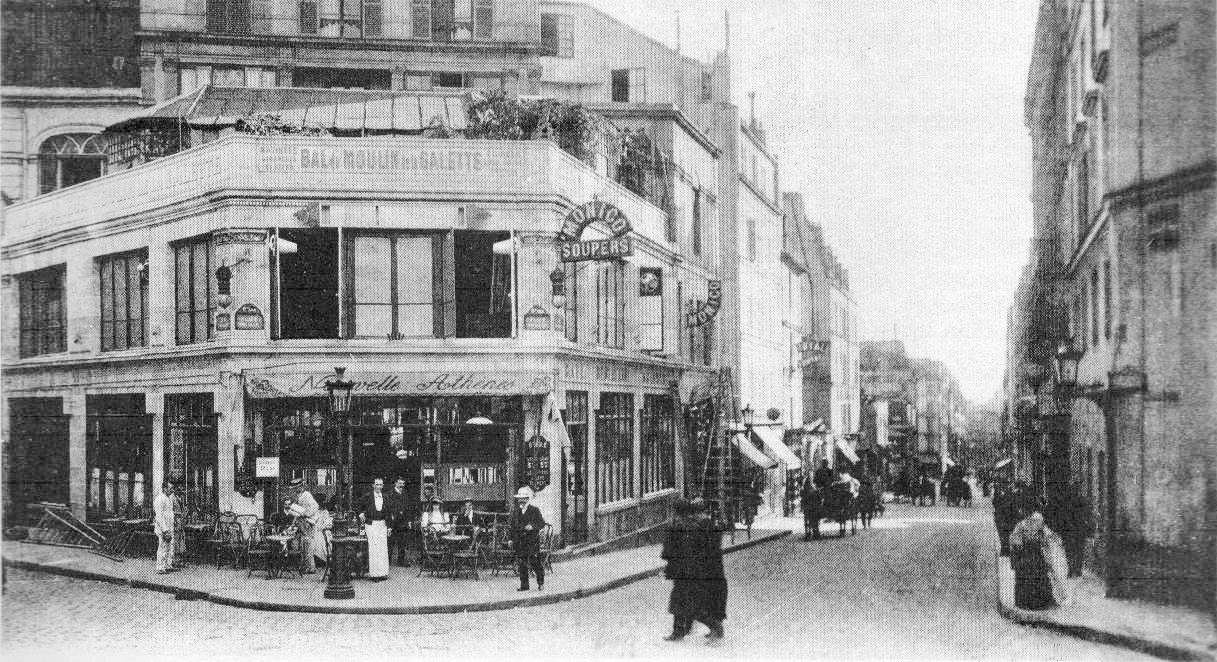
The café as it appeared at the end of the 19th century

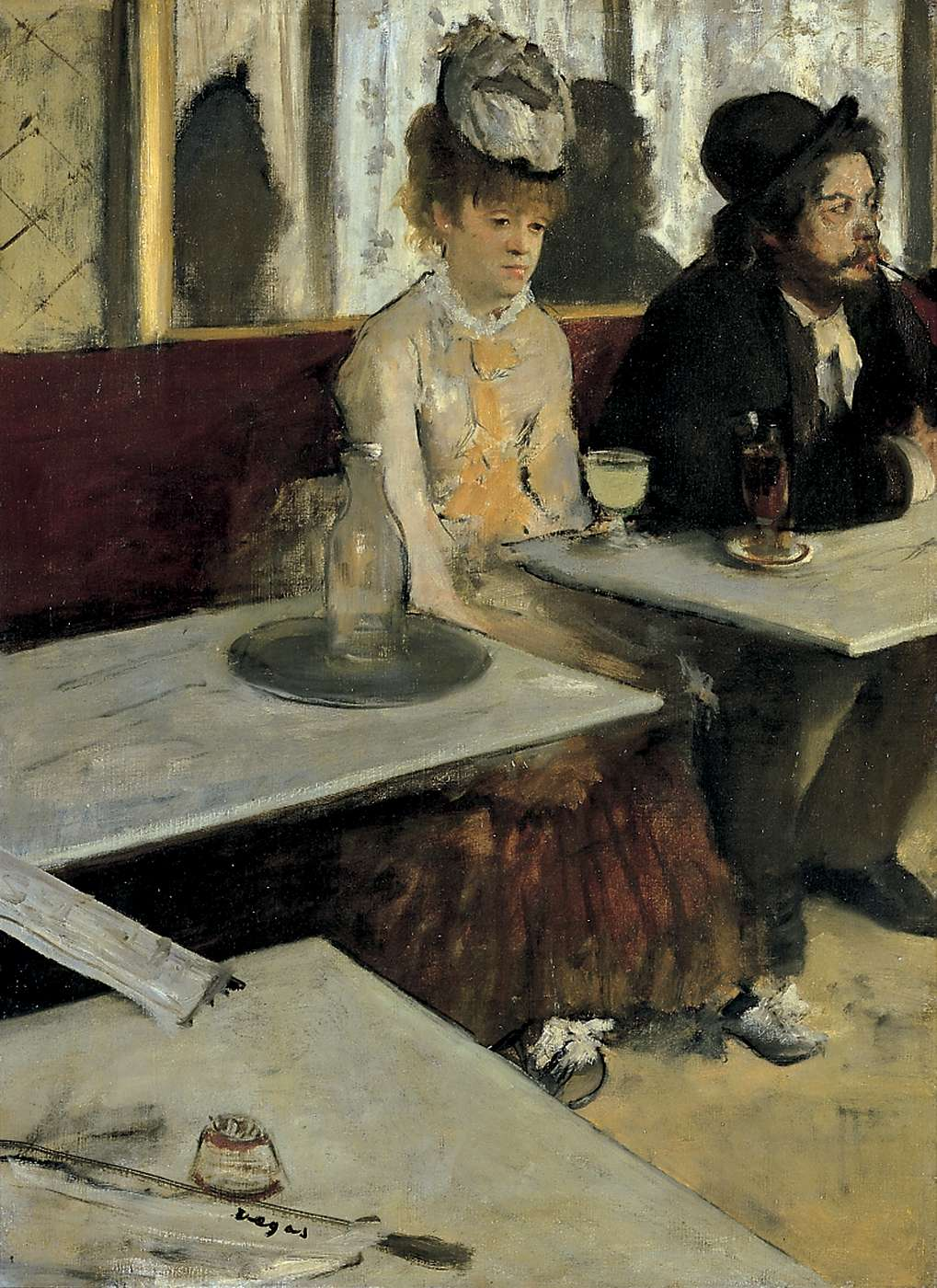
Two figures at the Nouvelle Athènes. L'Absinthe (1876), by Degas

The Nouvelle Athènes, or Café de la Nouvelle-Athènes, was a café located at 66 Rue Pigalle in the Place Pigalle in the quartier Nouvelle Athènes, Paris, France. It was the setting for many Impressionist paintings, as a result of being the meeting place for painters, including Henri Matisse, Vincent van Gogh and Edgar Degas.

== History ==
In 1874, a few artists met at the cafe to plan the first Impressionism painting exhibition. Degas painted L'Absinthe, modeled by Ellen Andrée, in this place. Another notable denizen was the eccentric composer Erik Satie, who played the piano in the cafe, and was there introduced to a fifteen-year-old Maurice Ravel by Ravel's father.

== After closure ==
During the 1940s, the café was known as the Sphynx; it was a striptease club frequented by the Nazis and later by the Free French partisans. From the 1960s to the 1990s, it was known as the New Moon, first a lesbian cabaret, then a rock venue where Mano Negra, the French Lovers, Noir Désir, Calvin Russel, the Naked Apes of Reason, Les Wampas, and many other groups performed.

The former café building was destroyed by fire in 2004 and demolished.

== See also ==
- List of strip clubs
- Musée de la Vie romantique, Hôtel Scheffer-Renan, Paris
- Le Rat Mort
