= Place Pigalle =

Square in Paris, France

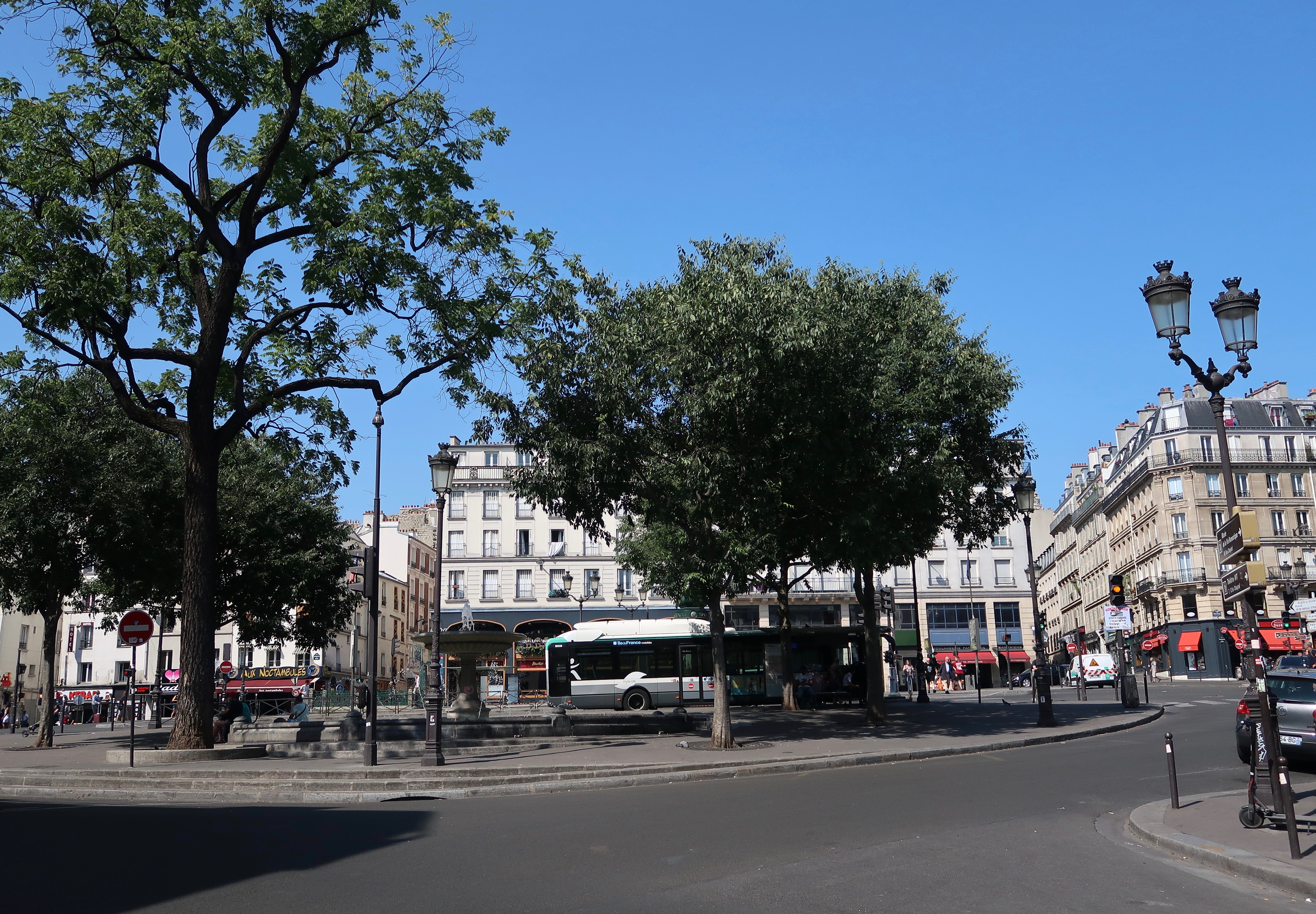
- Interactive map of Place Pigalle
- Former name: Place de la Barrière-Montmartre
- Namesake: Jean-Baptiste Pigalle
- Postal code: 7440
- Nearest metro station: Pigalle
- Coordinates: 48°52′55.8″N 2°20′14.2″E

The Place Pigalle is a public square located in the 9th arrondissement of Paris, between the Boulevard de Clichy and the Boulevard de Rochechouart, near the Sacré-Cœur, at the foot of the Montmartre hill.

The square takes its name from the sculptor Jean-Baptiste Pigalle (1714–1785), and it is the best-known square of the Quartier Pigalle, the Pigalle district. This site is served by lines 2 and 12 at Pigalle metro station.

== History ==
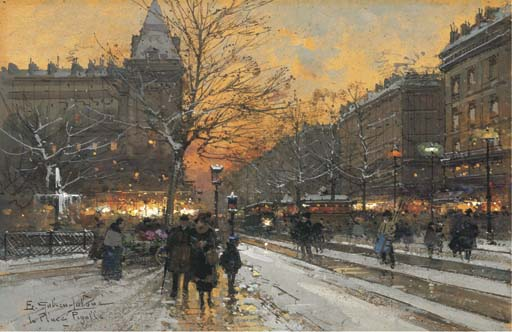
Place Pigalle (c. 1910), painted by Eugène Galien-Laloue

In 1826, Mr. Brack was authorized to form on his land and on land that the city conceded to him by way of exchange, in accordance with the deliberation of the Conseil municipal of 1 June 1826, a street 12 meters wide, from the Rue Laval (now the Rue Victor-Massé) to the Porte Montmartre (Montmartre Gate), and a semi-circular square in front of this gate. In 1864, this square, named the Place de la Barrière-Montmartre, was renamed the Place Pigalle.

On 18 March 1871, General Clément Thomas, having learned that General Claude Lecomte had been seized by the insurgents during the Paris Commune uprising, set out to find him. Dressed in disguise as a civilian, he arrived at around 5 p.m. on the Place Pigalle. When one of the rebels recognized him by his big white beard, he was taken to the Rue des Rosiers and executed.

By 1900 the square and the surrounding streets were a neighbourhood of painters' studios and literary cafés of which the most renowned was the Nouvelle Athènes (New Athens).

== Remarkable buildings and memorable places ==
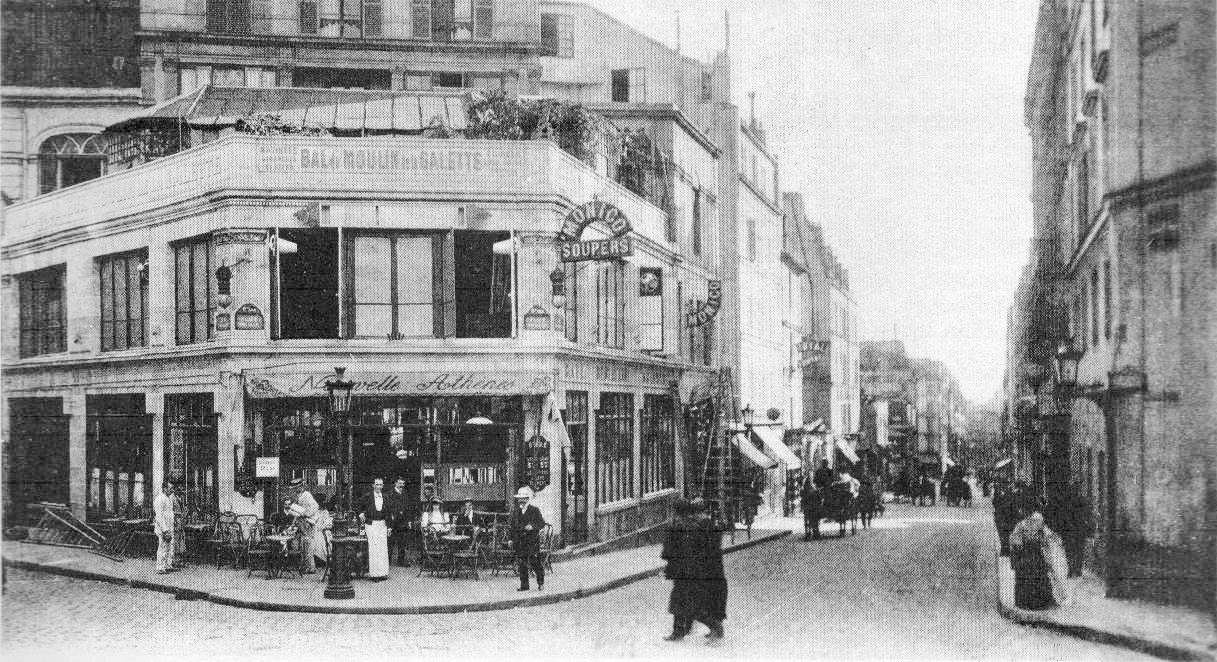
Café de la Nouvelle Athènes at the Place Pigalle, before 1900

- No 1: former location of the Café L'Abbaye de Thélème, which exhibited painters.
- No 3, at the corner with the Avenue Frochot: former location of the Café du Rat Mort, which was open at the end of the 19th century all night.
- No 5: location of the workshop of Gabriel Dauchot (1927–2005), painter from the School of Paris.
- No 9: former location of the Café de la Nouvelle Athènes. Photographer Paul Sescau (1858–1926) opened his second studio above in 1896 to be as close as possible to his artistic clientele. The Café de la Nouvelle Athènes became Le Sphynx in the 1920s and 1940s, a strip tease place, then the New Moon, which was a lesbian cabaret in the 1960s and 1970s, then in the 1980s and 1990s welcomed rock groups. The entire original building burnt down in 2004 and was demolished. This place was the property for over thirty years of the Polish-born French striptease artist Hélène Martini.
- No 11: the Folies Pigalle, a former Italian theater, then cabaret and finally cinema hall, which became a nightclub from 1991.

== In popular culture ==
- The Place Pigalle inspired a celebrated song by Georges Ulmer: "Un p'tit jet d'eau, une station de métro, entourée de bistrots, Pigalle ... ." ("A little spritz of water, a subway station, surrounded by bistros, Pigalle ... .")
- "Place Pigalle" is also the title of a song written by Alex Alstone and Maurice Chevalier. It was recorded by Chevalier with orchestra (Jacques Hélian, conductor) in Paris on 9 April 1946.
- Figure 8—Elliott Smith's fifth album and the last he released in his lifetime—was initially titled Place Pigalle. It is also the name of one of his unreleased songs, and he had "two or three more songs" about it.
- Hungarian pop star Eva Csepregi, of Neoton Familia, mentions the square and its notoriety as a red-light district in her 1987 solo single "Párizsi Lány" ("Paris Girl").
