= Marcellin Desboutin =

French painter (1823–1902)

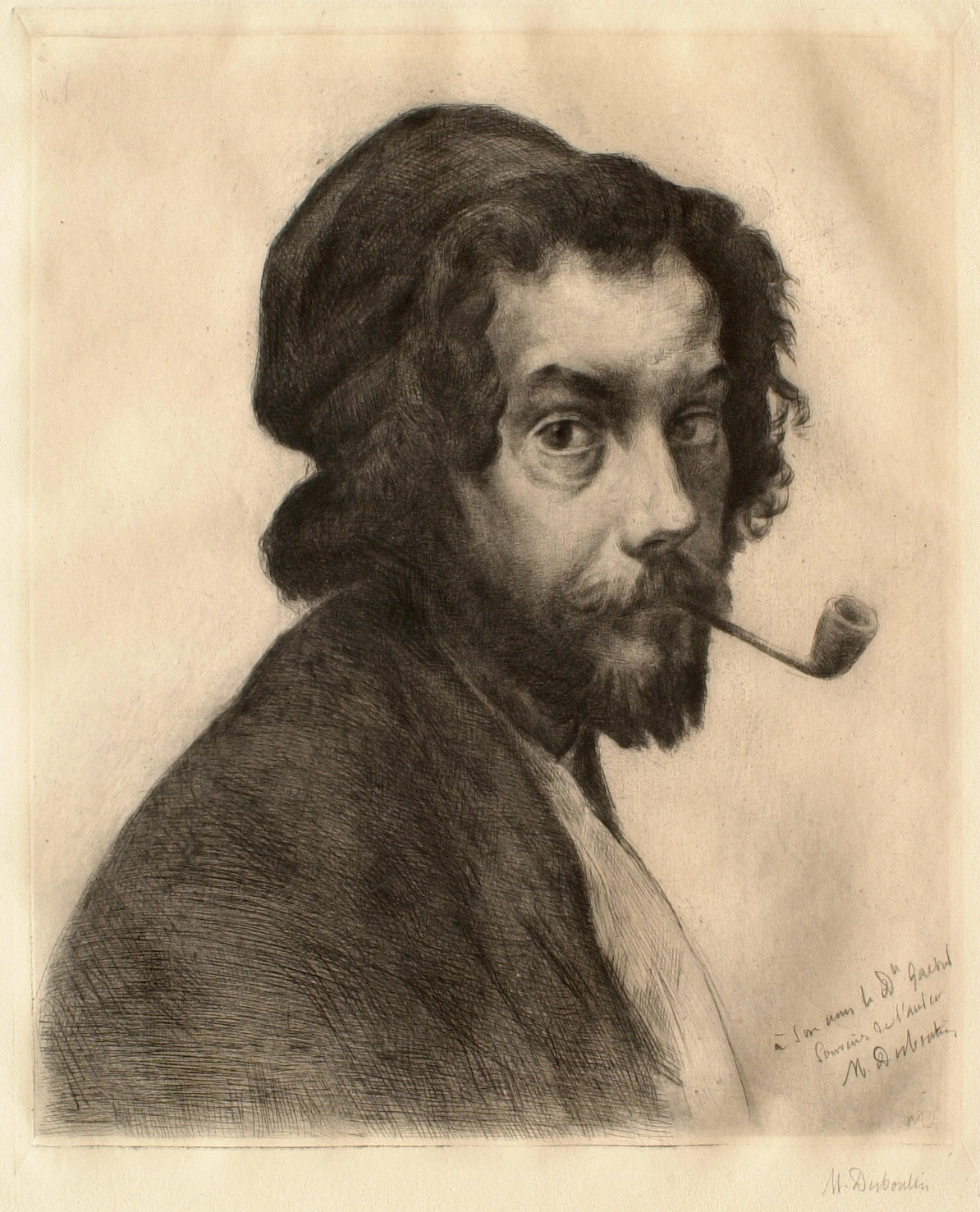
Self-portrait of Marcellin Desboutin (etching, 1879, Clark Art Institute, Williamstown)

Marcellin Gilbert Desboutin (26 August 1823 – 18 February 1902) was a French painter, printmaker, and writer. Desboutin always signed himself Baron de Rochefort.

== Biography ==
Desboutin was born in Cérilly, Allier on 26 August 1823. His parents were Barthélémy Desboutin, a bodyguard of Louis XVIII, and Baroness Anne-Sophie de Rochefort-Dalie Farges.

He studied at the Collège Stanislas de Paris and began studying law while writing dramatic works. In 1845, he joined the studio of sculptor Louis-Jules Etex at the École nationale supérieure des Beaux-Arts in Paris, then he studied painting for two years under Thomas Couture. He then traveled in Britain, Belgium, the Netherlands and Italy. In 1857, he acquired a large property near Florence, the Ombrellino, where he led a lavish lifestyle and became friends with Edgar Degas.

The Franco-Prussian War of 1870–71 interrupted the performances at the Théâtre Français of Maurice de Saxe, a play he had written in collaboration with Jules Amigues. In 1873 at the age of 50, ruined by speculations, Desboutin moved to Paris, where he and Degas frequently met—often joined by Édouard Manet—at the Café Guerbois and the café Nouvelle Athènes. At Manet's home he met Émile Zola.

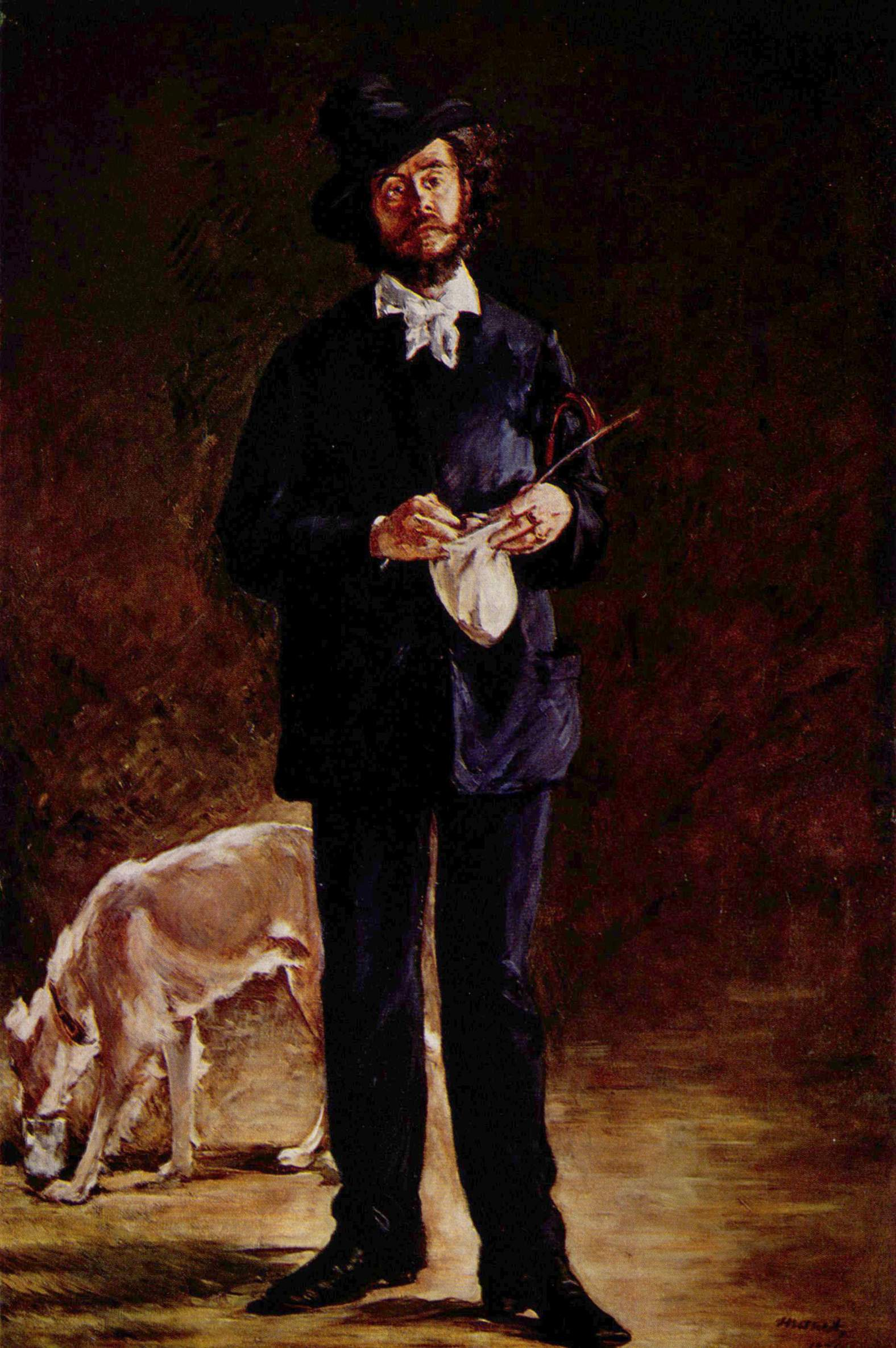
L'Artiste : Marcellin Desboutin Portrait by Édouard Manet (1875)

To make his living, he studied engraving and began a series of drypoint sketches while showing his paintings in exhibitions. He participated in the second exhibition of the Impressionists with six paintings, including Street Singer and The Cellist. He made many portraits of his friends including Edgar Degas, Auguste Renoir, Berthe Morisot, Pierre Puvis de Chavannes, Eugène Labiche, Nina de Villard, Erik Satie, Joséphin Péladan, Edmond and Jules de Goncourt.

In 1880, longing for the sun drove him to move to Nice, where he remained until 1888.

With the discovery, in a villa in Grasse, of five compositions by Fragonard, Desboutin made five interpretive drypoints: Surprise, Rendezvous, Confidence, the Lover Crowned and Abandoned.

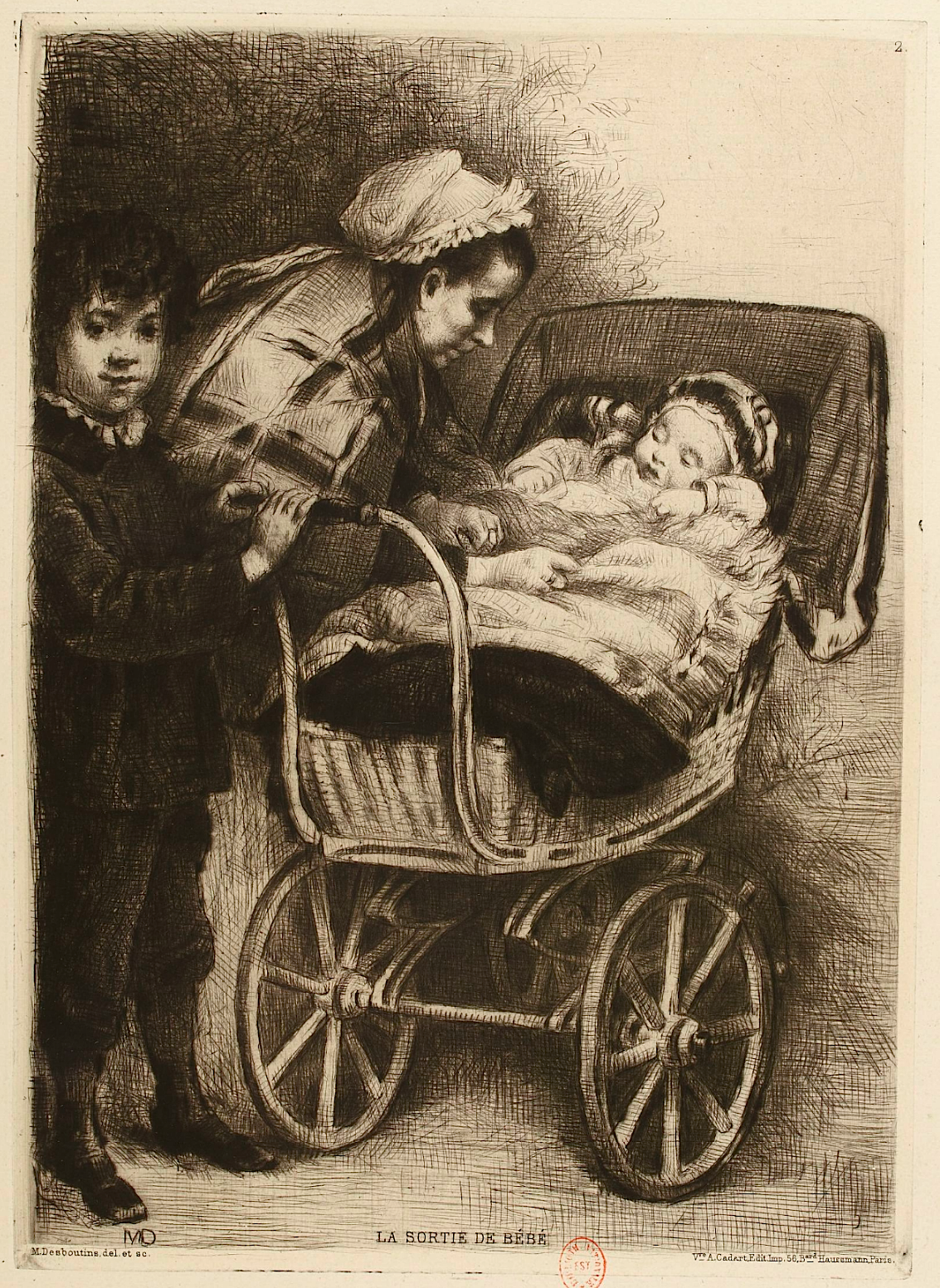
La Sortie de bébé, etching by Marcellin Desboutin, in L'Eau forte en 1879, Paris, Veuve A. Cadart.

Back in Paris, he helped found the Second National Society of Fine Arts and celebrated his appointment in the order of the Legion of Honour on 8 June 1895 with two hundred guests presided over by Puvis de Chavannes, in one of his favorite restaurants of Montmartre, giving the toast, "Gentlemen, drink to Manet in painting, in Chabrier music, Villiers and Duranty in literature!"

He returned to Nice in 1896 and worked there until his death there in 1902.

As a writer, Desboutin, besides Maurice of Saxony, is the author of a translation of Byron's Don Juan and of a drama performed in the late 1880s, Madame Roland.

Desboutin himself posed for Manet, Renoir and Degas. He is depicted in Degas' famous 1876 painting L'Absinthe. Two of his sons, André Desboutin–known as Mycho—(1870–1937) and Jean Desboutin—known as Tchiquine—(1878–1951), were also artists; the latter a noted photographer. He frequently depicted them in his work.

== Portraits ==
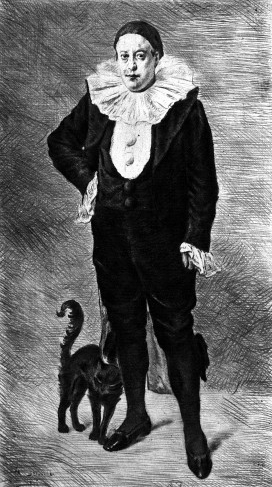
French painter and caricaturist Adolphe-Léon Willette, 1896

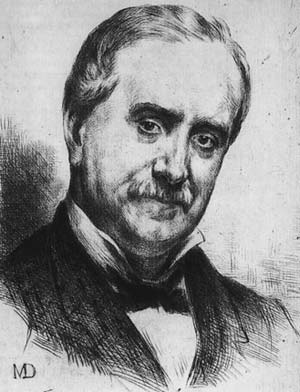
Paul Durand-Ruel
(1882)

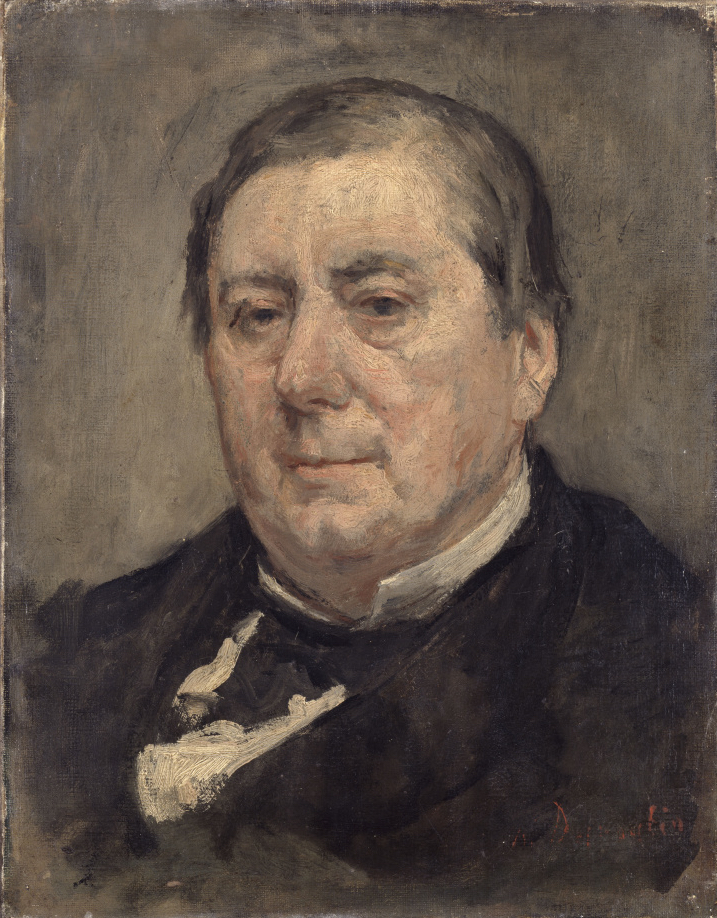
Eugène Labiche

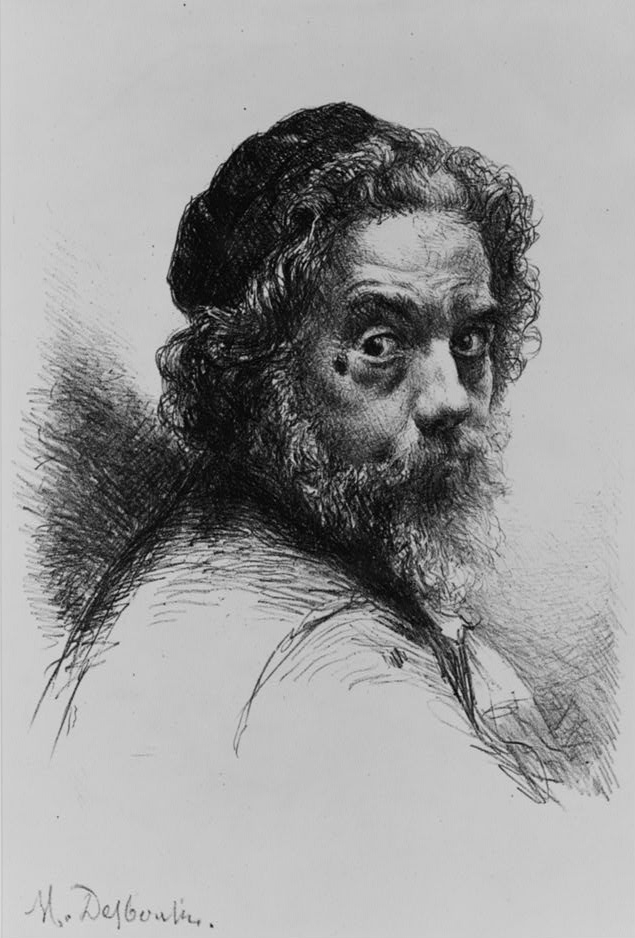
Self-portrait
Lithographie (1894)

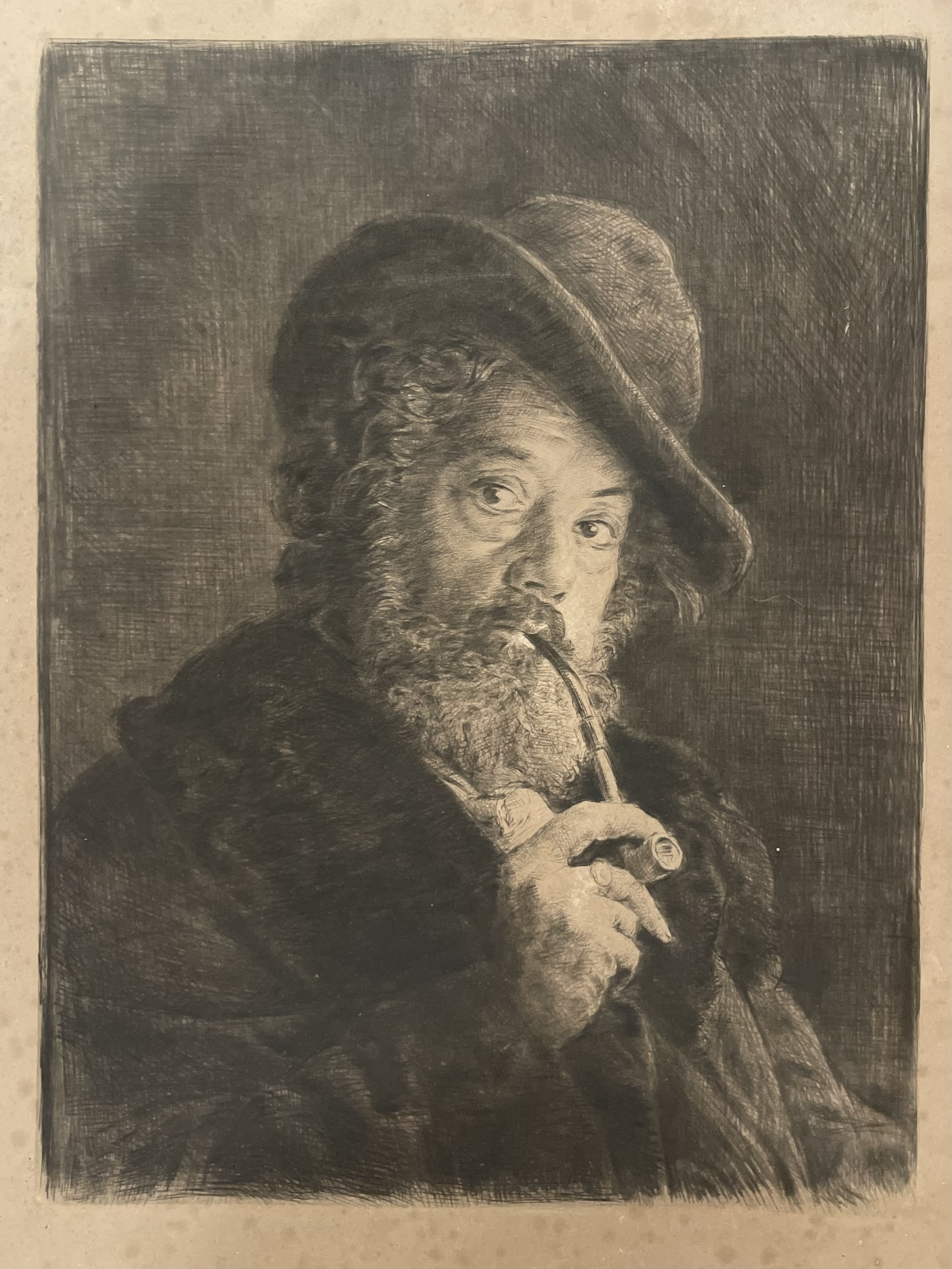
Debonair friend of Degas. Self-portrait in pencil with cafe attire

== Works ==
- Portrait de jeune fille, 1823, Musée des Beaux-Arts de Cambrai.
- Portrait de l'artiste (autoportrait), 1823, oil on canvas, 46 x 38 cm, Paris, Musée d'Orsay.
- La Voiture d'enfant, 1829, oil on canvas, 127 x 93 cm, Musée Fabre, Montpellier.
- Enfant et Polichinelle, 1882, oil on canvas, 34 x 21 cm, Musée d'Art moderne de Liège.
- Tête de fillette, 1882, oil on canvas, 33 x 25 cm, Musée d'Art moderne de Liège.
- Portrait de l'artiste (autoportrait), 1886, oil on canvas, 32,5 x 24 cm, Musée Jules Chéret, Nice.
- L'Italienne (portrait de Madame Noverra), oil on canvas, 24,5 x 19 cm, Musée départemental de l'Oise, Beauvais.
- Portrait de Madame Cornereau, oil on canvas, 46 x 38 cm, Musée d'Orsay, Paris.
- Portrait du Sâr Mérodack Joséphin Péladan, 1891, oil on canvas, 121 x 81 cm, Musée des Beaux-Arts d'Angers.
- Portrait de Joseph Ravel, père de Maurice Ravel, 1892, oil on canvas, Le Belvédère, Montfort-l'Amaury.

== Publications ==
- Chansons et chansonnettes (1852)
- Maurice de Saxe, drama in 5 acts, in verse, with Jules Amigues, Paris, Théâtre-Français, 2 June 1870
- Versailles, poème (1872)

== Bibliography ==
- Noël Clément-Janin, La Curieuse Vie de Marcellin Desboutin, peintre, graveur, poète, H. Floury, Paris, 1922
- Bernard Duplaix, "Marcellin Desboutin Prince des Bohèmes", Les Imprimeries Réunies, Moulins-Yzeure 1985
