= Henri Cohen (composer) =

French numismatist, composer and writer

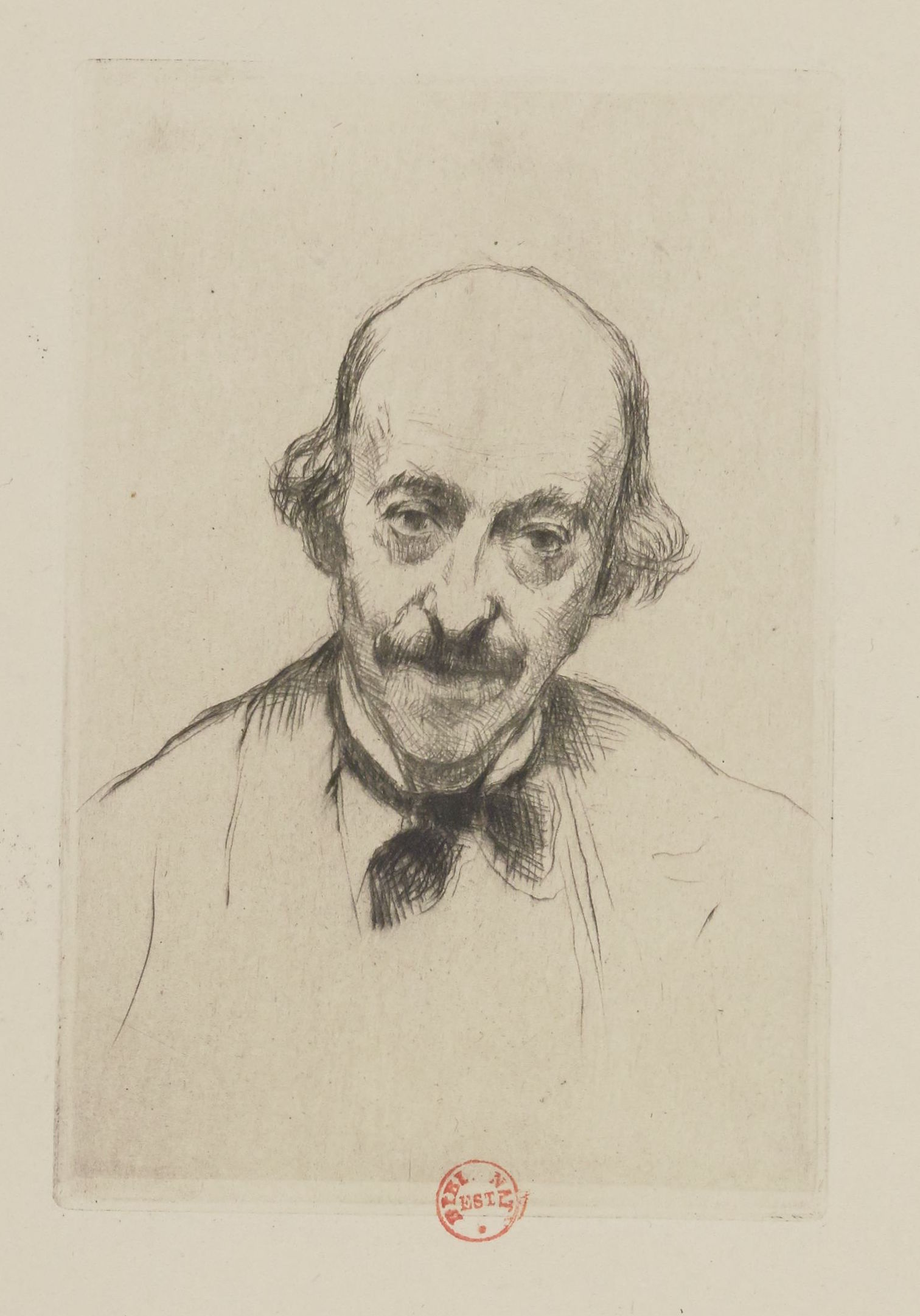
Portrait of Henry Cohen by Marcellin Desboutin

Henri Cohen (21 April 1806 – 17 May 1880) was a French music theorist, composer, and numismatist of Dutch birth.

== Career ==
Born in Amsterdam, Cohen moved with his family to Paris at a young age. He studied there with Anton Reicha (music theory and composition), François Lays (singing), and Felice Pellegrini (singing).

In 1832–34 and 1838–39 he was active as an opera composer in Naples, with some of his works premiering under the name "Carlo Coen". In 1841 his opera Antonio Foscarini premiered successfully at the Teatro Comunale di Bologna, prompting a revival the following year at the Teatro Regio di Torino. He was thereafter active as music teacher in Paris, including teaching at the Conservatoire de Paris, and was for a time director of the conservatory in Lille.

Cohen's opera "l'Impératrice", was performed around 1834 in Naples, Paris, and London. Moreover, he published four tracts about musical theory. On his advice as singing tutor, Marguerite Baux made her début in February 1876 as Rachel in La Juive, although initially she had been expected to sing Marguerite in Gounod's Faust.

Cohen died in Bry-sur-Marne.

== Numismatics ==
Cohen published several works on numismatics during his lifetime. His Guide de l'amateur des livres à vignettes du XVIII Siècle went through four editions and is considered the standard bibliography of French 18th century illustrated books. He is perhaps best known for his two fundamental works on ancient numismatics: the first, published in 1854, dealt with the Roman Republican coinage, while the second, issued in eight volumes from 1859 to 1868, focused on the coinage of the Roman Empire, from Pompey to Romulus Augustus (49 B.C. - 476). Cohen was also curator of the numismatics collection at the Bibliothèque nationale de France in Paris.

== Selected works ==
- Faust and Marguerite, opera, Paris 1846
- Description générale de monnaies de la république romaine (Paris, 1854)
- Guide de l'acheteur de médailles romaines et byzantines (Paris, 1876)
- Description historique des Monnaies frappées sous l'Empire romain, communément appelées Médailles impériales, 8 vols (Paris, 1859–1868)
  - 2nd edition (1880–1890), available online here and here
- Guide de l'amateur de livres à vignettes du XVIII-e siècle (Paris, 1870; reprints: 1873, 1877, 1880)
