= The Absinthe Forger =

2024 non-fiction book by Evan Rail

- Author: Evan Rail
- Genre: Nonfiction
- Publisher: Melville House Publishing
- Publication date: October 15, 2024
- Pages: 368
- ISBN: 9781685891541

The Absinthe Forger is a nonfiction book by Evan Rail. It was published by Melville House Publishing in 2024.

== Synopsis ==
The book deals with the unmasking of a forger who sold fake bottles of vintage absinth.

== Reception ==
The book received mostly positive reviews from critics. J.D. Biersdorfer of The New York Times wrote that the book "along with the promised detective story, delivers a lively stand-alone seminar on temptation." Kirkus Reviews described the book as "lively and informed but sometimes rambling, with digressions about his food writing, the science behind unmasking the phony spirits, and the contentious personalities of the since-dispersed underground absinthe scene."

Chris Turner-Neal of Country Roads Magazine wrote that the "combination of investigation, travelogue, and tasting notes is an unalloyed treat to read, as sip by sip, train journey by flight, Rail pieces together the story of the absinthe forger." David Daniel, writing for The Arts Fuse, described the book as suspenseful but criticized the decision to market it as a mystery.
