= Ellen Andrée =

French model (1856–1933)

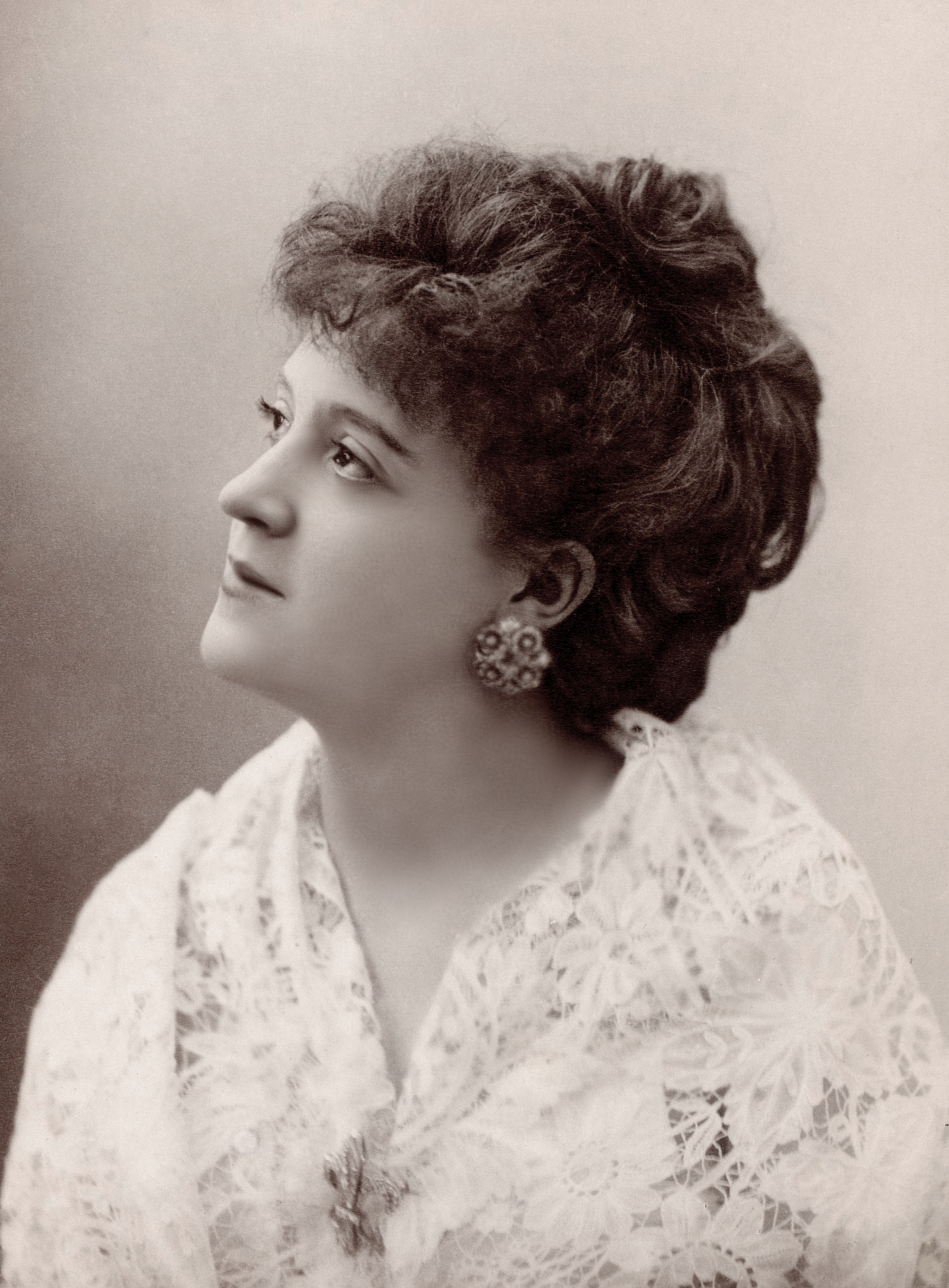
- Andrée c. 1890
- Born: Hélène Marie André; 7 March 1856; Paris, France
- Died: 9 December 1933 (aged 77)
- Occupation(s): Actress, model
- Known for: Model for Manet, Degas, and Renoir

Ellen Andrée (born Hélène Marie André; 7 March 1856 – 9 December 1933) was a French actress and model for Édouard Manet, Edgar Degas, Pierre-Auguste Renoir and other artists.

== Early life ==
Ellen Andrée was born in 1856 on the rue Geoffrey-Marie in Paris. She was daughter of a military officer and his wife, a department store clerk. Andrée originally intended to become a primary school teacher, but began modeling in the 1870s as a teenager in Montmartre.

== Career ==
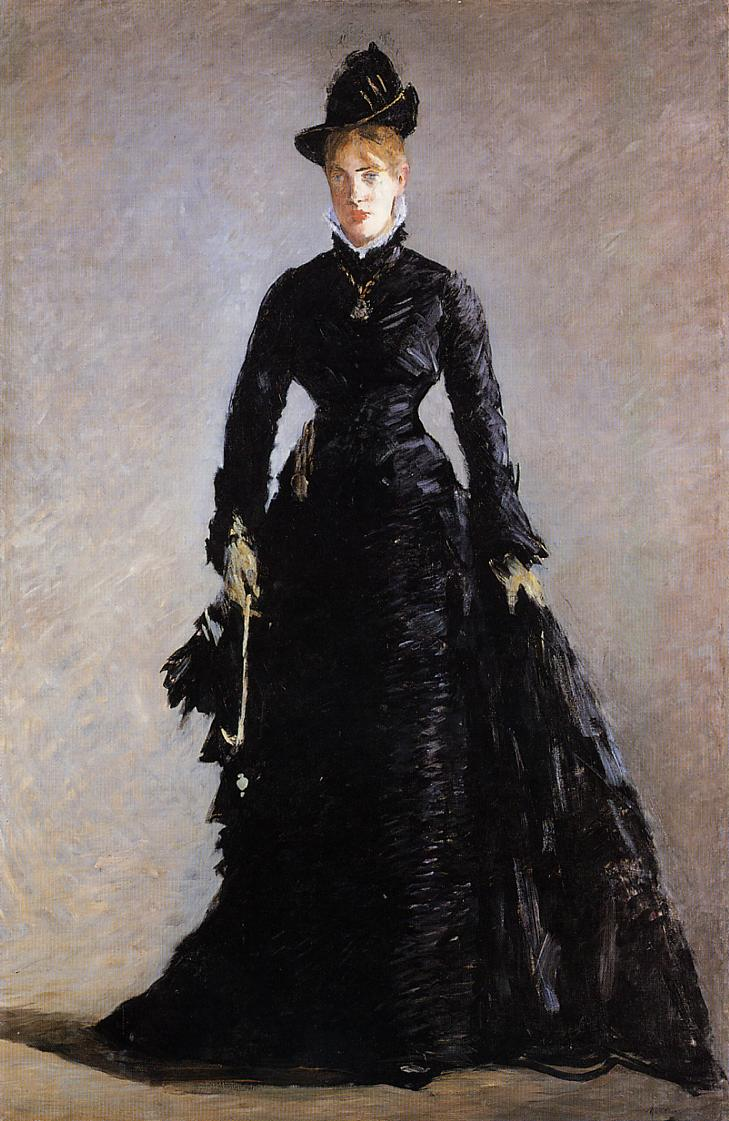
La Parisienne (1874) by Manet

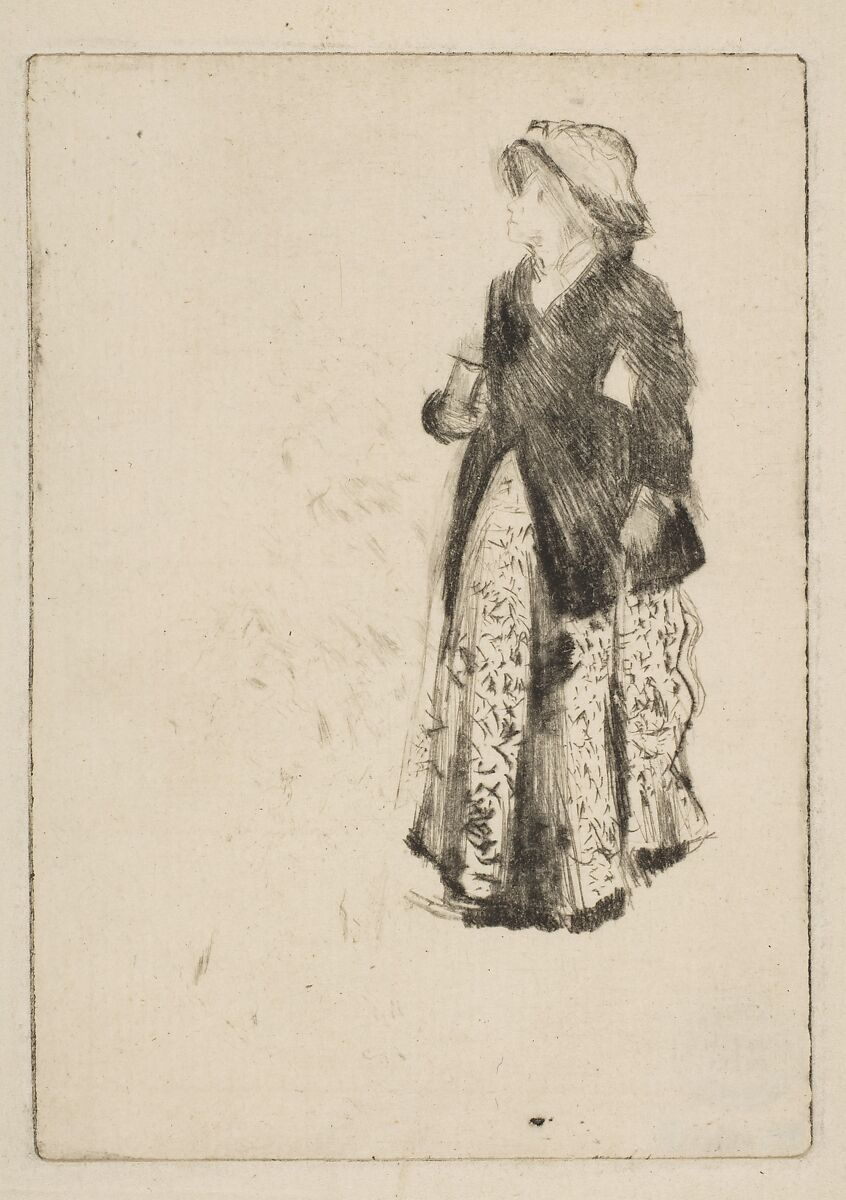
The Actress Ellen Andrée (1879) by Degas

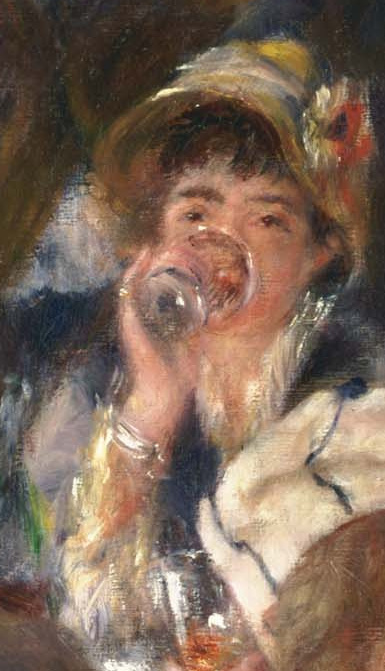
Andrée drinking in the center of Luncheon of the Boating Party (1881) by Renoir

=== Modeling ===
One of her first, and among the most famous, modeling jobs was posing for Degas's L'Absinthe or The Absinthe Drinker (1875-76). This painting sparked great controversy as it conveyed a strong sense of isolation, making it a haunting depiction of Parisian modernity. In 1878 Andrée modeled for the nude courtesan Marie in Rolla, a similarly scandalous painting by Henri Gervex, that was based on a poem by Alfred de Musset. Andrée continued to model for Degas and he depicted her in an 1879 print. Andrée was depicted in Renoir's 1880 painting the Luncheon of the Boating Party along with fellow actress Jeanne Samary.

While working as a model, she was discovered by the actor Baron Bouquin de Lassouche, star of the Impressionist spoof La Cigale.

=== Theater ===
Andrée became an actress in the Naturalist style of theatre, in which the purpose was to give a near perfect view of real scenes and not to rely on the audience's imagination. In 1877 she made her stage debut at the age of 21 at the Théâtre du Palais-Royal when she appeared in the comedy, La Chaste Suzanne by Paul Ferrier. In the early 1880s Andrée gave up modeling and devoted herself fully to acting. She acted for several decades, appearing in plays and comedies such as those by Sacha Guitry and Georges Courteline. By 1901 Andrée was given leading roles in André Antoine's Théâtre Libre for the adaptation of Poil de Carotte.

== Personal life ==
After an active career, including travel to the United States, Argentina, and Russia, she married Henri-Julien Dumont, an impressionist painter, and settled down in the Paris suburb Ville-d' Avray.

Andrée occupied a space at the intersection of high culture and bohemian life, interacting with artists, actors, writers, poets, and intellectuals.

== Bibliography ==
- Jean Sutherland Boggs: Degas. Ausstellungskatalog Paris, Ottawa, New York, Réunion des musées nationaux, Paris 1988, ISBN 2-7118-2146-3.
- Françoise Cachin: Manet. DuMont, Köln 1991 ISBN 3-7701-2791-9
- John Collins: Ellen Andrée in Berk Jiminez: Dictionary of Artists' Models. Fitzroy Dearborn, Chicago 2001, ISBN 1-57958-233-8.
- Bernard Denvir: The chronicle of Impressionism. Thames and Hudson, London 1993, ISBN 0-500-23665-8.
- Boggs, J. S., Degas, E., & Galeries nationales du Grand Palais. (1988). Degas (pp286) . Metropolitan Museum of Art. 28
- "Ellen-Andrée". Les Archives du Spectacle (in French). 1856-03-07. Retrieved 2025-02-22.
- "Ellen Andrée (1856-1933)". data.bnf.fr. Retrieved 2025-02-22
- Hagen, R., Hagen, R. (2003). What Great Paintings Say (pp 444) . Germany: Taschen.
- Jiminez, J. B. (2013). Dictionary of Artists' Models (pp 42-46). Taylor & Francis
- MIGULSKI, BOGDAN (2025-01-29). "Ellen Andrée: Model for Degas and Manet". Retrieved 2025-02-22.
- Benoît Noël, Jean Hournon: Parisiana : la capitale des peintres au XIXe siècle. Presses Franciliennes, Paris 2006, ISBN 2-9527214-0-8.
- The Pretty Women of Paris: Their Names and Addresses, Qualities and Faults, Being a Complete Directory, Or, Guide to Pleasure for Visitors to the Gay City. (1883).
- Theodore Reff: Manet and modern Paris. National Gallery of Art, Washington und University of Chicago Press, Chicago und London 1982, ISBN 0-226-70720-2.
- Maryanne Stevens, Colin B. Bailey, Stephane Guegan: Manet, portraying life, Ausstellungskatalog Toledo Museum of Art und Royal Academy of Arts 2012–13, Royal Academy of Arts, London 2012, ISBN 978-1-907533-52-5.
- Terry W. Strieter: Nineteenth-century European art. Aldwych Press, London 1999, ISBN 0-86172-115-2.
- Adolphe Tabarant: Manet et ses oeuvres. Gallimard, Paris 1947.
