= Serge Ayoub =

French political activist

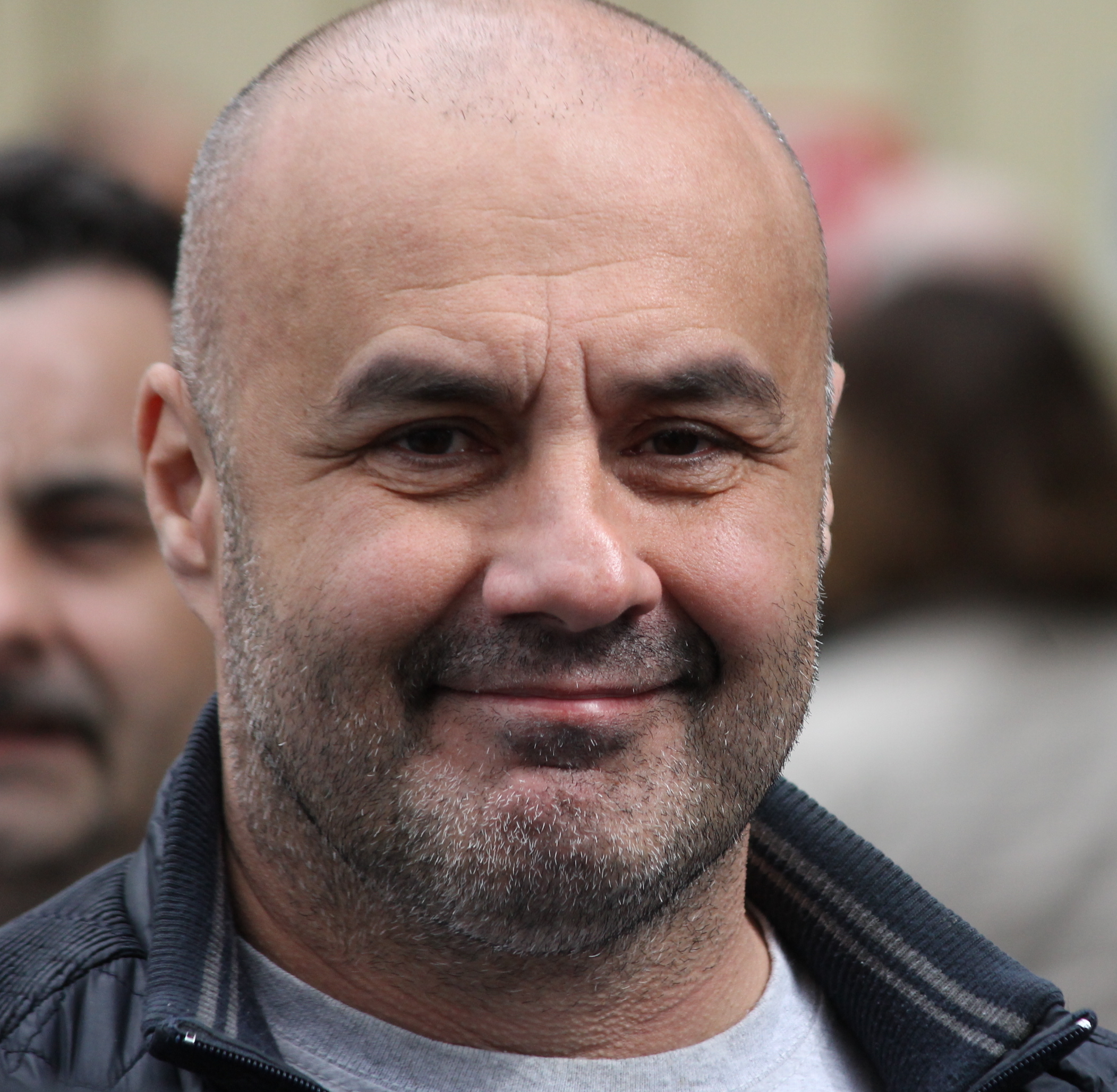
- Serge Ayoub in May 2014
- Born: Serge Élie Ayoub; 29 October 1964 (age 61); Bagnolet, Seine-Saint-Denis, France
- Other names: Batskin
- Occupation: Political activist

Serge Élie Ayoub (born 29 October 1964), also known under the alias Batskin, is a French political activist associated with the far-right and formerly the hooligan movement.

== Biography ==
Ayoub was born in Bagnolet. His French mother was a magistrate, his father, of Lebanese descent, was a civil servant. On a language study trip to England, he first learned about punk movement and became interested in neo-Nazi skinheads.

He became associated with the hooligans of the Parc des Princes, supporters of Paris Saint-Germain, with the Pitbull Kop. He founded in 1987 the Jeunesses Nationalistes Révolutionnaires ("Revolutionary Nationalist Youth", also known by its initialism JNR) and joined the Pierre-and-Marie-Curie University. In 1993, he was a candidate during the 1993 French legislative election where he obtained 0.17% of the votes. He was associated with Alain Soral's movement, Égalité et Réconciliation, close to Frédéric Chatillon, member of Groupe Union Défense and founded a bar for conferences with Jean-Paul Gourévitch, Pierre Sidos, Pierre Hillard, François-Bernard Huyghe, Guillaume de Tanoüarn, Michel Drac, Romain Bessonnet, Jean-Marie Vianney Ndagijimana, Véronique Hervouët, David Mascré, Maurice Gendre, Denis Collin and Marine Le Pen. In 2013, he made several media appearances following the death of Clément Méric, an antifascist activist who died during a fight with skinheads. The decision to give Ayoub public visibility was criticized by then-Minister of Education Najat Vallaud-Belkacem.

== Personal life ==
In the 1990s, Ayoub was romantically involved with pornographic actress Tabatha Cash.

== Publications ==
- Conte barbare, 2008, Le Retour aux Sources, (ISBN 978-2-35512-015-2)
- Doctrine du Solidarisme, 2012, Éditions du Pont d’Arcole (ISBN 979-1-09196-602-3)

== Bibliography ==
- Éric Rossi, Jeunesse française des années 80–90 : la tentation néo-fasciste, sous la dir. et préf. d'Hugues Portelli, Librairie générale de droit et de jurisprudence, 1995, 382 p. (ISBN 2-275-00272-3)

== Filmography ==
- Sur les pavés, autonomiste media, 2009.

== See also ==
- Extreme right
- Gremium Mc
- Hooligan
- Outlaw motorcycle club
- White power skinhead
