= Jordan Bardella =

French politician (born 1995)

Jordan Bardella MEP
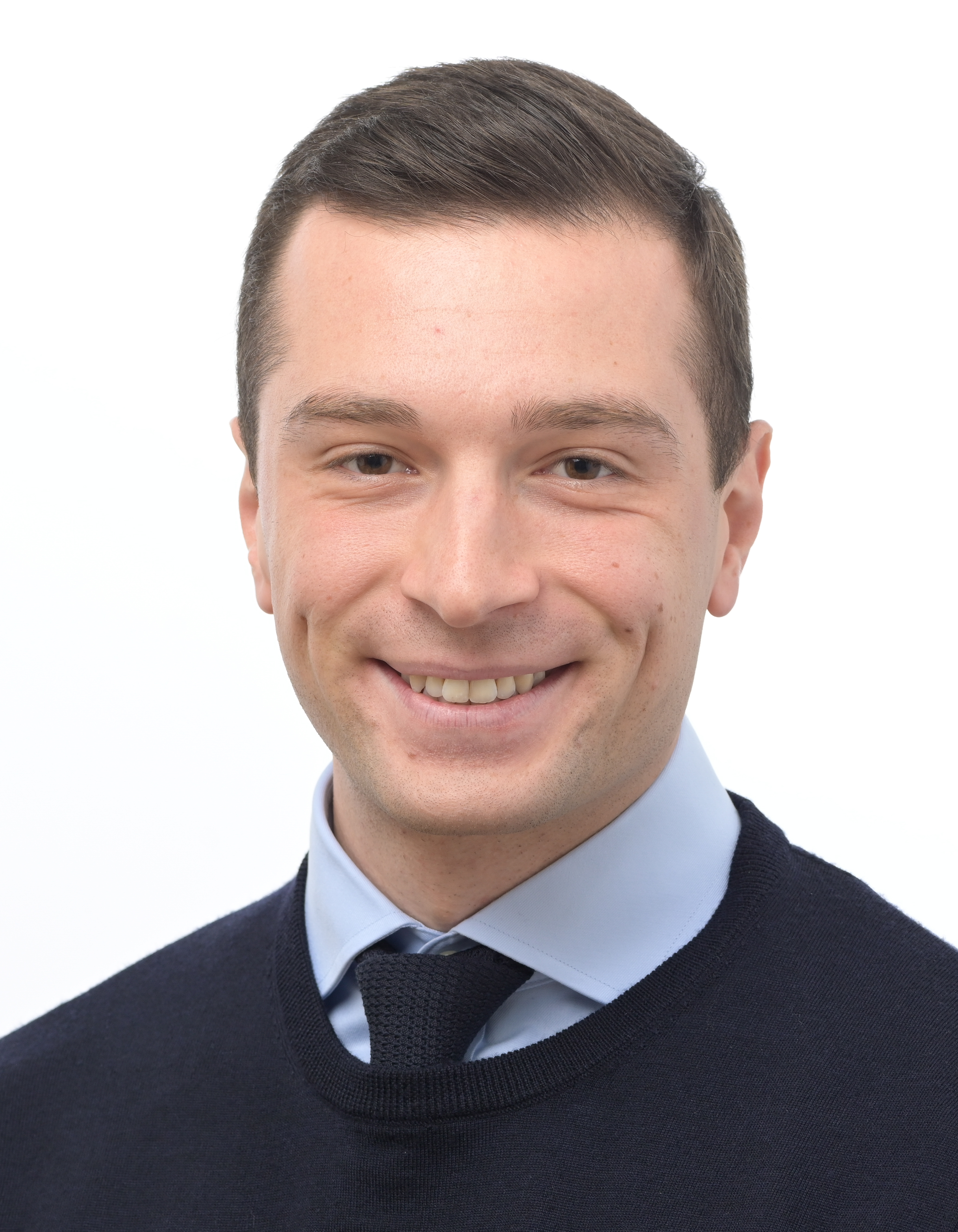
- Official portrait, 2024

President of the National Rally
- Incumbent
- Assumed office 12 September 2021 (Note: Acting: 12 September 2021 – 5 November 2022)
- Vice President: Steeve Briois; Louis Aliot; David Rachline
- Preceded by: Marine Le Pen

Chairman of Patriots for Europe
- Incumbent
- Assumed office 8 July 2024
- Preceded by: Position established
Other party offices
Vice President of the National Rally
In office 16 June 2019 – 5 November 2022
Preceded by	Florian Philippot; Steeve Briois
Succeeded by	Steeve Briois; Louis Aliot; David Rachline
National Director of Génération Nation (Note: When Bardella became president of Génération Nation, the official name was Front National de la Jeunesse (FNJ).)
In office 12 March 2018 – 4 July 2021
Preceded by	Gaëtan Dussausaye
Succeeded by	Aleksandar Nikolic
Spokesman of the National Rally
In office 21 September 2017 – 16 June 2019 Serving with Sébastien Chenu and Julien Sanchez
Leader	Marine Le Pen
Preceded by	Position established
Succeeded by	Laurent Jacobelli

Member of the European Parliament
- Incumbent
- Assumed office 2 July 2019
- Constituency: France

Member of the Regional Council of Île-de-France
- In office 18 December 2015 – 17 February 2025
- President: Valérie Pécresse
- Constituency: Seine-Saint-Denis

Personal details
- Born: 13 September 1995 (age 31) Drancy, Seine-Saint-Denis, France
- Party: National Rally (since 2012)
- Other political affiliations: Génération Nation (2012–2021)
- Domestic partner(s): Nolwenn Olivier (2020–2024); Maria Carolina of Bourbon-Two Sicilies (since 2026)
- Education: Paris-Sorbonne University (dropped out)

Jordan Bardella (French: [ʒɔʁdan baʁdɛla]; born 13 September 1995) is a French politician who has been the president of the far-right National Rally (RN) since 2022, after serving as acting president from September 2021 to November 2022 and as vice-president from 2019 to 2022. Bardella has served as a Member of the European Parliament (MEP) since 2019, when he was the RN lead candidate in the European Parliament election; he also was a regional councillor of Île-de-France from 2015 until he resigned his mandate in 2025.

Before becoming acting president of the RN, Bardella served as vice-president from 2019 to 2021 and the party's spokesman from 2017 to 2019. From 2018 to 2021, he was also president of its youth wing, the Génération Nation (GN), later renamed Rassemblement National de la Jeunesse (RNJ).

In June–July 2024, Bardella led the RN-dominated coalition into the 2024 French legislative election which resulted in historic gains for the far-right though significantly below expectations. Shortly after the election, Bardella was elected as chairman of the new Patriots for Europe group in the European Parliament.

== Early life and education ==
Jordan Bardella was born on 13 September 1995 in Drancy, Seine-Saint-Denis, northeast of Paris, where he was raised as an only child. Bardella was predominantly raised by his single mother, a kindergarten assistant, Luisa Bertelli-Motta (born 1962 in Turin, Piedmont, Italy). His father, Olivier Bardella (born 1968 in Montreuil, Seine-Saint-Denis of North Italian, French-Alsatian and Franco-Algerian origin), is a small-medium business owner specialised in beverage vending machines, who was (Note: The surname Bardella is found primarily in Northern Italy (Piedmont, Veneto). Jordan Bardella's grandfather—Guerrino Bardella—who works as a carpenter and cabinet maker, arrived in Montreuil in 1960 and in 1963 married Réjane Mada, who was born in 1944 in La Ferté-sous-Jouarre. Réjane Mada is the daughter of an Algerian from Kabylia, Mohand Séghir Mada (1903-1974), born in Guendouz, in the commune of Ait R'Zine, who came to France in the 1930s to work as a construction laborer in Villeurbanne, and his wife, Denise Annette Jaeck, a Parisian of Alsatian origin. Guerrino Bardella and Réjane Mada divorced when Bardella was one year old, and Guerrino settled in Casablanca, Morocco, where he married a Moroccan woman named Hakima.) living in the wealthier suburb of Montmorency.

He claims that, "like many families who live in the neighbourhood", he was confronted with violence from a young age and saw how his "mum had difficulty making ends meet". Critics mention that his father had some wealth when Bardella focuses on the social difficulties he had to face growing up in France's poorest department, a social hotspot with the highest proportion of immigrants.

Bardella received a high school diploma with distinction in economics and social sciences at the private Catholic Lycée Saint-Jean-Baptiste-de-la-Salle. After failing the entrance exam for Sciences Po, Bardella studied geography at Paris-Sorbonne University but dropped out to focus on politics.

=== Beginnings in the National Front (2012–2017) ===
In 2012, Bardella became a member of the National Front (FN) at age 16, and has said he joined "more for Marine Le Pen than for the National Front". He then became the FN department secretary of Seine-Saint-Denis in 2014 at age 19, making him the party's youngest ever departmental official. From 16 February to 30 June 2015, Bardella worked as parliamentary assistant to FN Member of the European Parliament Jean-François Jalkh. During this period, political observers began to consider him a leading figure on issues in the French banlieues within the FN.

Bardella ran in the 2015 departmental elections to represent the commune of Tremblay-en-France. He and his fellow candidate, Christine Prus, lost in the second round with 41% of the vote. In the 2015 regional elections, he was a candidate at the head of the FN list in Seine-Saint-Denis and was elected to the Regional Council of Île-de-France.

In January 2016, Bardella launched the organization Banlieues Patriotes. The group sought to "break with the politics of the city and reach out to voters in the forgotten territories of the Republic." He then became part of Marine Le Pen's campaign team in the 2017 presidential election, in which she finished second. Bardella was a candidate for Seine-Saint-Denis's 12th constituency in the legislative elections that year, and was eliminated in the first round with 15% of the vote.

=== Vice-President of the National Rally and Member of the European Parliament (2017–2021) ===
After the FN's defeat in the 2017 presidential election and the resignation of vice-president Florian Philippot, Bardella was appointed party spokesman alongside Sébastien Chenu and Julien Sanchez. The next year, Le Pen also appointed him president of the Front National de la Jeunesse (FNJ), which later became Génération Nation (GN).

At age 23, Bardella was designated as the first candidate on the National Rally list (as the FN was renamed in 2018) for the 2019 European Parliament election in France. He was called a "puppet of Marine Le Pen" by Libération and seen as inexperienced by many voters. Nevertheless, the RN finished the election in first place with 23 seats and 23.3% of the popular vote, ahead of President Emmanuel Macron's La République En Marche! Bardella thus became the second-youngest MEP in European Union history after Ilka Schröder of Germany, who was elected at 21. Along with the rest of the FN delegation, he sits with the Identity and Democracy (ID) group in the European Parliament. He is also a member of the European Parliament Committee on Petitions.

Bardella was named second vice-president of the RN on 16 June 2019, and first vice-president in 2021. He headed the RN list in the 2021 French regional elections in Île-de-France, receiving 13.8% of the vote in the first round and 10.8% in the second. By contrast, the right-wing list led by Valérie Pécresse won with 46% of the vote. Journalist Richard Werly attributed the defeat to Bardella's "inability to find a convincing regional angle despite his familial connections [to the region]" and "lack of depth in a university-educated region, having abandoned his post-secondary studies." An opposition member, he resigned from his mandate in February 2025 in a context of high absenteeism rates (73% in 2023).

=== President of the National Rally (2022–present) ===
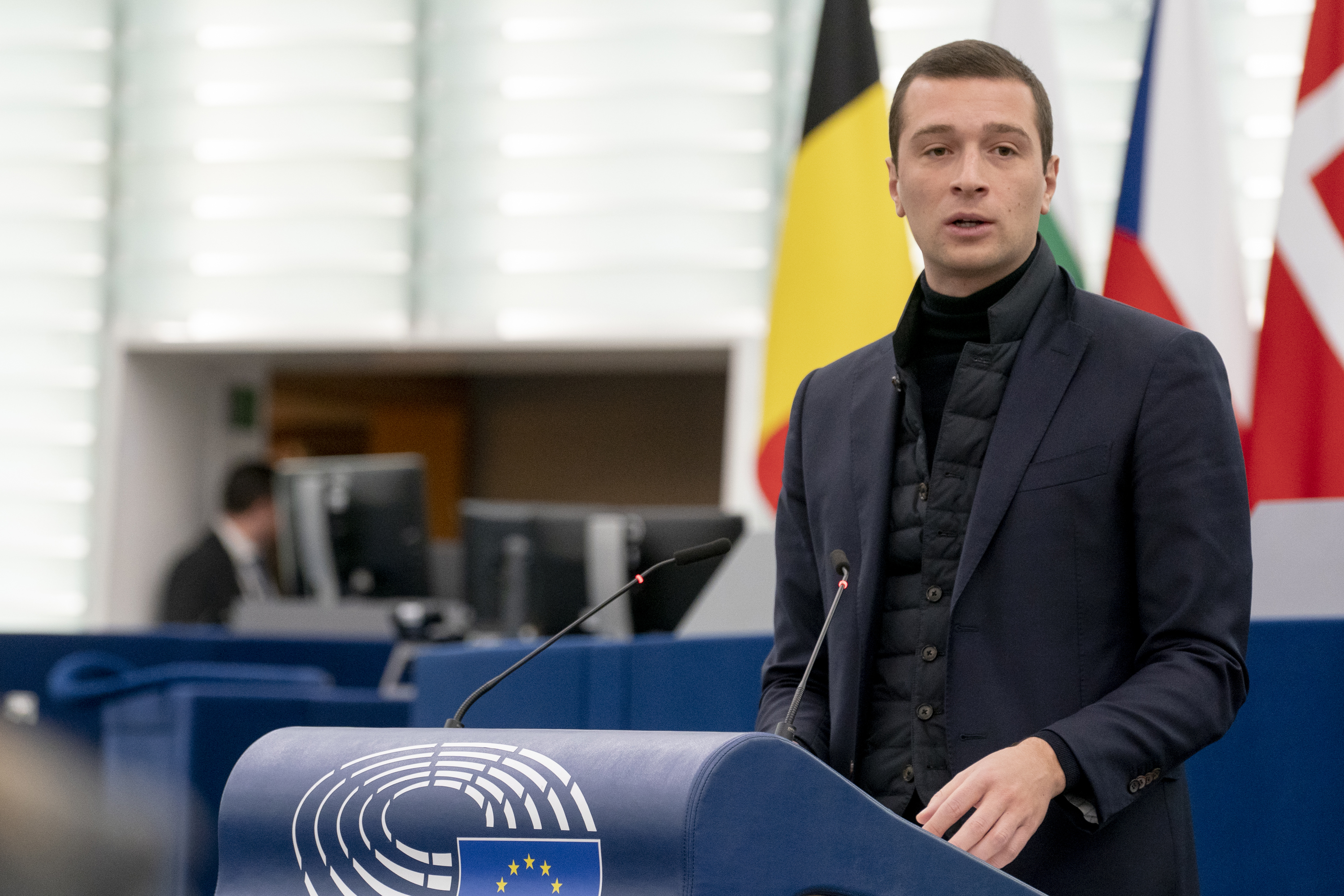
Bardella in the European Parliament in 2022

Bardella became acting president of the National Rally after Le Pen resigned to run in the 2022 French presidential election. Bardella was elected president of the National Rally on 5 November 2022, beating Louis Aliot by 85% to 15% of party members who voted.

He takes the lead of the third group in the European Parliament, Patriots for Europe, initiated by Hungarian prime minister Viktor Orban. The latter gives the far-right group the objectives of positioning itself against "military support for Ukraine" and against "illegal immigration" and for the "traditional family" and "easing environmental constraints". One of the six vice-presidents of this group is the Italian politician Roberto Vannacci. Bardella also joined the European Parliament's Foreign Affairs Committee (AFET), which is described by Euractiv as "an opportunity to gain depth on international issues."

Bardella helped bring the RN to victory during the 2024 European Parliament election as the party achieved a score of 31.37%, gaining 30 seats, coming in first place in front of the presidential party-list led by Valérie Hayer (14.60%, 13 seats).

In February 2025, Bardella cancelled a speech to the Conservative Political Action Conference (CPAC) after Steve Bannon was accused of making a Nazi salute.

On 31 March, Marine Le Pen was found guilty of embezzling EU funds and sentenced to a four-year prison sentence, of which two years would be suspended, whilst also being barred from running in the 2027 French presidential election. As Bardella was not involved in the scandal, he quickly became the front-runner to be the RN candidate. However after a court shortened Le Pen's sentence allowing her to run in 2027, Bardella lost his position as a leading candidate for the RN. On 24 October 2026, he was re-elected as president of the party. He was the only candidate running for the position.

== Political positions ==
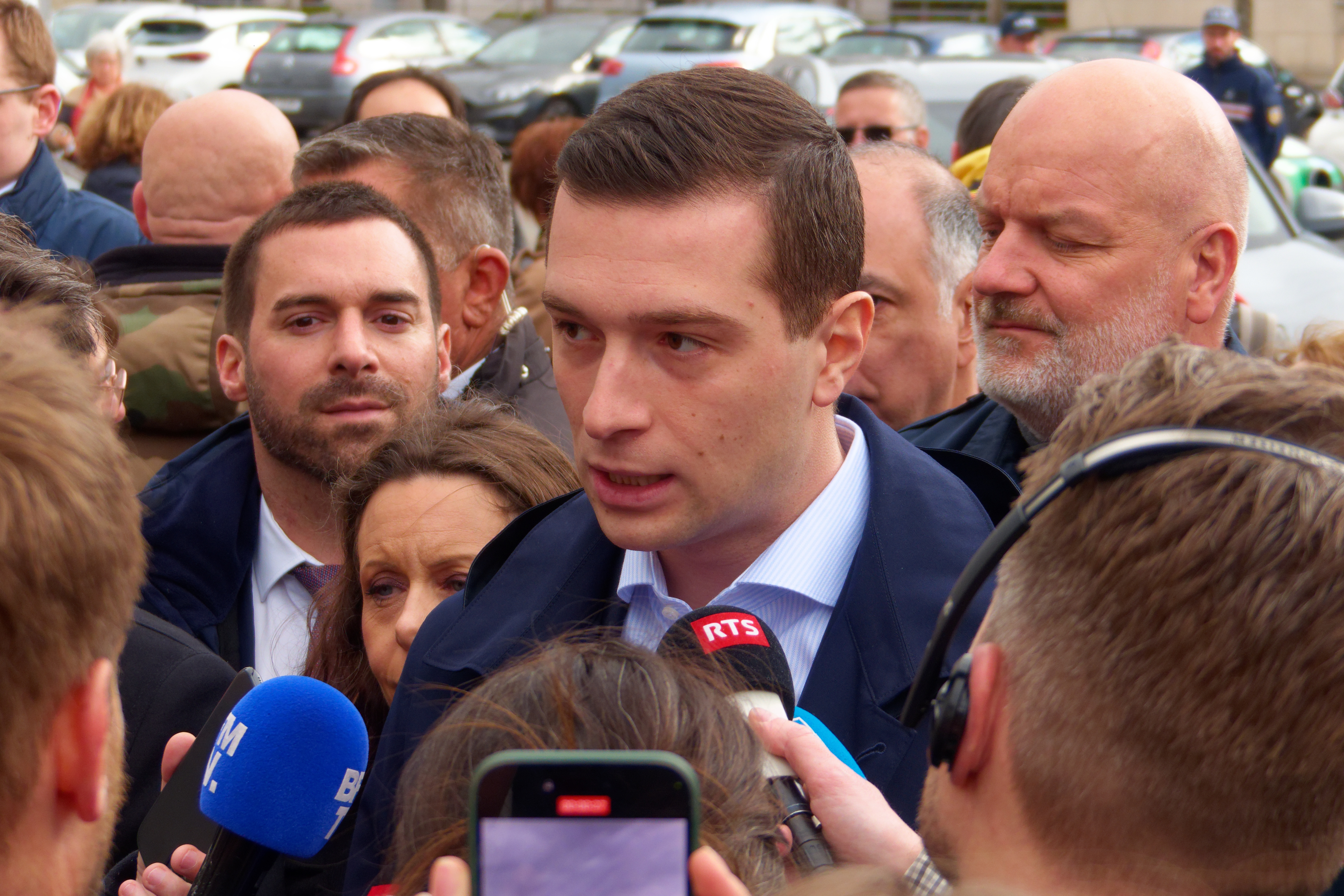
Bardella in March 2024

During his campaign in the 2019 European elections, Bardella said that his generation's two political priorities are the migrant crisis and the environmental crisis, saying, "if humans are responsible for what seems to be climate change, our economic model depends on it." He also opposed French entry into new free trade treaties. Bardella criticized the "punitive environmentalism" of the Macron government, which he argued was "criminalizing French people." In May 2019, Bardella evoked but did not name the Great Replacement conspiracy theory during a televised debate.

On 12 November 2023, he took part in the March for the Republic and Against Antisemitism in Paris in response to the rise in antisemitism since the start of the Gaza war.

=== Immigration ===
Bardella, like his party, focuses on migration. He says that immigration could lead to the extinction of France, the French identity, French sovereignty, and "France's soul". He also believes that the European Union further degrades these values, according to his demands at the EU's campaign meetings. Shortly after the 2024 European parliament election, Bardella said he intended to abolish birthright citizenship for children of foreign nationals born and living in France.

It is reported that he promotes the great replacement theory during his speeches to activists, "using every possible circumlocution to avoid calling it 'the Great Replacement,' as the term was banned by Marine Le Pen." He also wanted to "cut off social assistance to people living in France illegally."

In response to the migration crisis in Ceuta, Bardella criticised Spain's migration policies, accusing the Spanish government of encouraging illegal migration and calling for stronger border controls in France.

=== Economy ===
Jordan Bardella calls for an "economic program in favor of business and entrepreneurship" and criticizes France as "the European champion of taxes and duties." He thus calls for the abolition of the social solidarity contribution of companies, used to finance old-age insurance, and the contribution on the added value of companies (CVAE). Two taxes which, according to Libération, mainly concern CAC 40 companies. He welcomes Emmanuel Macron's decision to reduce the corporate tax rate to 25%. He also supports the payment of the Revenu de solidarité active (RSA) conditional on 15 hours of compulsory activity, and returns, in June 2024, to the National Rally's promise to repeal the pension reform if it comes to power.

According to Le Monde, Bardella's right-wing positioning on economic issues also corresponds to a division of roles with Marine Le Pen, the latter targeting primarily the working classes and him the upper middle classes and retirees. Unlike Le Pen, Bardella also favours pro-business and economic liberal policies, influenced by the economic agenda of Italian Prime Minister Giorgia Meloni.

=== Environment ===
His positions on environmental and ecological issues are characterized by a desire for political ideological division. A fervent defender of the car, he positions himself in favor of meat consumption and "in the fight against constraints in favor of the environment". The essayist Pierre Madelin affirms that the party he leads is showing opportunism in appropriating the climate issue and putting it at the service of identity and nationalist themes. He thus declares that "The best ally of ecology is the border" and launches alongside Marine Le Pen's "Stop wind turbines" campaign, the latter being considered by Jordan Bardella as a "tragedy for the environment".

Bardella has stressed that environmental protection should not be left to the political left, but talks about it as a form of patriotism, stating that patriotism means the protection of the people and their environment. With that statement he associates the climate crisis with the anti-immigrant stance of the RN, since he agrees with the left wing that the climate crisis will lead to an unstoppable global mass refugee crisis. Bardella and the RN base their immigration positions on the pursuit of political and ideological divisions, which must be exploited. They want to take advantage of the gap between urban and rural, or peripheral, spaces and attitudes.

In early 2024, Jordan Bardella took advantage of the 2024 French farmers' protests to launch an offensive against "punitive ecology", which he called "the restrictive standards adopted in France and Europe to restore biodiversity and reduce CO_{2} emissions." He fueled a divide between "elites versus the people, urban versus rural" to mobilize his electorate. Le Monde noted, however, that Jordan Bardella never addressed the issue of sharing "value and responsibility" between the agri-food industry and large-scale distribution, which is considered crucial, particularly by livestock farmers, and that he also never addressed the subject of climate change and its consequences for agriculture. Interviewed on 29 January 2024, he declared, regarding Prime Minister Gabriel Attal, "I expect him to renounce the European Green Deal."

=== Social issues ===
Bardella has expressed personal opposition to same-sex marriage on the grounds that it will open the door to surrogacy or medically assisted reproduction. Nevertheless, he has accepted that "for the majority of France, marriage for all is now a given" and stated his support for a citizens' initiative referendum on the topic in 2019. He has also said he will not campaign to abolish same-sex marriage as leader of the National Rally, arguing that debate on the matter is over and that France faces more pressing issues. Bardella also advocates "cutting social services for people who illegally arrived in France" and legalizing cannabis for medical purposes.

=== Foreign policy ===
According to Le Monde, Bardella can "boast of having woven closer ties" with former Italian Minister for Internal Affairs Matteo Salvini, whom he views as a role model. He is also believed to be close to Marine Le Pen's adviser Frédéric Chatillon, having at one point been in a relationship with his daughter. At the same time, Bardella has said he is close to Le Pen. In 2021, he posted statements of support for Génération Identitaire, a far-right organization the French government had dissolved for inciting racial hatred and violence, on Facebook. Facebook removed the posts and suspended certain features of his account.

In February 2023, Bardella applauded a speech by Volodymyr Zelenskyy in the European Parliament. Regarding the Russian invasion of Ukraine, Bardella expressed the belief that Putin is waging a wider war on the West and that "there is a war of interest and a war of influence between France and Russia that extends to Africa." He also declared that there can be no way out of the war "without the withdrawal of Russian troops and without the return to full sovereignty of Ukraine in the territories currently occupied by Russia". However, a spokesperson for Bardella later clarified to Libération that this statement does not concern Crimea and the other territories controlled by pro-Russian secessionists since the Donbas war. In September 2023, La Tribune analyzed that Bardella's stance on Russia is more critical compared to that of Marine Le Pen and that "Jordan Bardella is on the pro-American line of Giorgia Meloni." In July 2024, in the European Parliament, he voted against a resolution to aid Ukraine in the context of Russian invasion of Ukraine. Although Bardella supported providing ammunition and defensive equipment to Ukraine, he is opposed to sending French soldiers or long-range missiles to Ukraine, and opposes Ukrainian membership in NATO.

In March 2025, Bardella attended a conference in Israel aimed at combatting antisemitism. This event was notable for its attendance of right-wing allies, which also led to some high-profile people set to attend from 'boycotting' the event in protest, including the UK's Chief Rabbi. Bardella supports Israel in the Gaza war and believes that the Hamas threat facing Israel is equivalent to the threat posed by radical Islamists and terrorists to France.

== Personal life ==
He had a relationship with Kelly Betesh, followed by a relationship with Kerridwen Chatillon between 2017 and 2018, from the GUD group and daughter of Frédéric Chatillon and Marie d'Herbais, regular host of Jean-Marie Le Pen's video blog.

Bardella was in a relationship with Nolwenn Olivier from 2020 to 2023, daughter of Marie-Caroline Le Pen, Marine's elder sister.

Bardella is an agnostic.

He denied rumors that he is gay in an interview on M6 June 2025, declaring "I am heterosexual". Responding to TikTok videos that claim he is, he attributed those to social media user's "unlimited imagination". When pressed further on the persistent rumors and if there was any truth, he answered, "I could say the opposite to please you, but … there's not the shadow of a doubt."

In January 2026, he was spotted leaving Le Figaro's 200th anniversary party with Princess Maria Carolina of Bourbon-Two Sicilies. In March 2026, Paris Match revealed that the two were in a relationship.

== Controversies ==
=== Jean-Marie Le Pen's antisemitism and holocaust ===
On 5 November 2023, Jordan Bardella declared on BFM TV that he "did not believe that Jean-Marie Le Pen was antisemitic", despite his numerous convictions by the courts on this subject, including in 1990, for his minimization of the Holocaust program carried out with the gas chambers by Nazi Germany; statements that the honorary president of the National Rally maintained in 2015. A few months later, he retracted his remarks, acknowledging a clumsiness, admitting that Jean-Marie Le Pen's remarks were "eminently antisemitic remarks".

=== Accusations of racist and homophobic remarks on Twitter ===
On 18 January 2024, on the program Complément d'enquête, three former close associates of Jordan Bardella claimed that he maintained and used, between 2015 and 2017, an anonymous X (formerly Twitter) account called "RepNat du Gaito", on which he allegedly made racist and homophobic remarks, insulted journalists, and glorified Le Pen. Based on two other sources formerly close to Jordan Bardella, Libération confirmed the information. Furthermore, Marine Le Pen was a subscriber to this Twitter account until the revelations in Complément d'enquête. However, Bardella denies that the account belonged to him.

The party's press officer, Victor Chabert, accused Complément d'enquête of defamation and declared that the channel would be prosecuted. Meanwhile, France 2 reportedly received a formal notice the same day.

=== Indictment regarding the city of Trappes ===
After Ali Rabeh was re-elected as mayor of Trappes in 2021, Bardella described the city as an "Islamic republic" on the radio station Europe 1. He then announced on 2 February 2022, that he was indicted for this statement, saying "I am disappointed that the French justice system pursues the same goal today as the Islamists, to silence those who denounce real issues and those who oppose the transformation of countless neighbourhoods in France."

=== Suspicions regarding fake employment at the European Parliament ===
In 2019, Challenges revealed that Jordan Bardella had been a part-time parliamentary assistant of the Member of EU Parliament Jean-François Jalkh during 2015, and that he had been identified by the EU Parliament in 2017 as being part of the assistants linked to "irregular use of the parliamentary assistant compensation". Le Canard enchaîné revealed later that he had been similarly suspected by the European Anti-Fraud Office, since 2016.

In September 2024, La Machine à gagnant (The Winning Machine), a book by Libération journalist Tristan Berteloot, was published. He claims that Bardella helped produce false proof of employment to retrospectively justify his work as a parliamentary assistant. Bardella denies the accusations, claims to have "never had to justify anything or even provide the slightest document," and announces that he intends to file a complaint against Libération.

Dov Alfon, the publishing director of the daily newspaper Libération, is being sued for defamation for an article published on 26 September 2023. The hearing was held on 31 January 2025. Bardella also filed a complaint regarding the articles and book published in 2024, but the hearings have not yet taken place. On 21 March 2025, Bardella lost his defamation lawsuit, granting Libération the right to run the headline that Bardella was a "ghost parliamentary assistant".

On 25 March 2025, according to Libération, a complaint was filed against Bardella and Jean-François Jalkh by the Association for the Ecologist Defense of Democracy and Freedoms (Adelibe) for "fraud". The anti-corruption association took this action following the newspaper's accusations published in September 2024.

=== Allegation of antisemitic comments ===
On 28 September 2026, investigative website Mediapart published an article alleging that Bardella made various antisemitic remarks during private written exchanges in 2013 when he was a teenage member of the party’s predecessor, the National Front. The alleged comments include "the Jew has to dominate other peoples, crush them, and rob them; a Zionist is necessarily a Jew, and fundamentally so", "all the banks are owned by Jews", and "What they want is a new world order dominated by Israel, with of course Jerusalem as its capital." Bardella has denied making the comments, stating that the allegations were an attempt to destroy his political career and accusing his opponents of "total war". Marine Le Pen has said she has total confidence in Bardella. On 1 October 2026, Mediapart disclosed that the comments were Facebook Messenger communications provided by two sources close to Bardella. Mediapart stated that the conversations have been authenticated with Meta and the data extraction was subsequently verified by a bailiff.

== See also ==
- List of members of the European Parliament for France (10th legislature)
- List of members of the European Parliament (9th legislature)

== Notes ==
Party political offices
Preceded by Gaëtan Dussausaye	National Director of the Génération Nation; 2018–2021	Succeeded by Aleksandar Nikolic
Preceded by Marine Le Pen	President of National Rally; 2022–present	Incumbent
