= Agnès Soral =

French-Swiss actress

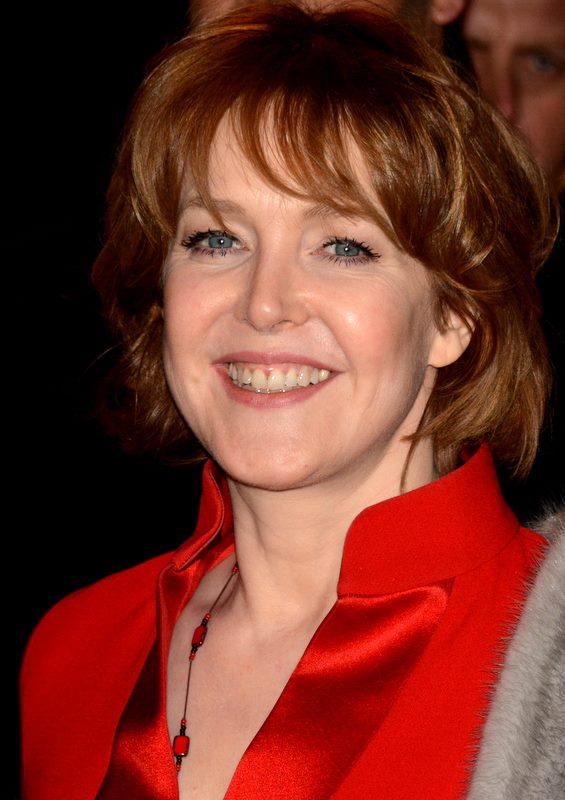
- Agnès Soral at the 39th César Awards, in 2014
- Born: Agnès Marielle Christiane Bonnet; 8 June 1960 (age 66); Aix-les-Bains, France
- Other name: Agnès Bonnet de Soral
- Occupation: Actress
- Years active: 1976–present
- Relatives: Alain Soral (brother)

Agnès Soral (born Agnès Marielle Christiane Bonnet, 8 June 1960) is a French-Swiss actress, best known for her role in the film So Long, Stooge (Tchao Pantin, 1983).

== Early life ==
Agnès Bonnet was born in Aix-les-Bains to a French-Swiss family. She is the youngest of three siblings. Her father worked as a notary and a legal advisor. Her family has roots in Soral, Switzerland, and has long used "Bonnet de Soral" as an unofficial name. She later used "Soral" as a stage name and adopted it as her legal name in the early 1990s.

During the 1960s, her family moved to Meudon, in the Paris area. She later said that she had grown up in a dysfunctional family, and described her father as a "narcissistic pervert" who mistreated his wife and beat his children. In 1973, her father received a prison sentence for fraud in Switzerland. Her family, facing financial ruin, left the Parisian region and settled in Grenoble, then Annemasse.

== Career ==
As a teenager, she worked as a ticket taker in a theatre where she debuted on stage by replacing an actress on the spot. She later met actor Jean-Claude Drouot, who encouraged her to persevere. She took acting classes at the Conservatoire de Grenoble and made her film debut aged 17, by starring in the comedy Un moment d'égarement (1977), directed by Claude Berri, where she played a teenager who seduces a middle-aged man.

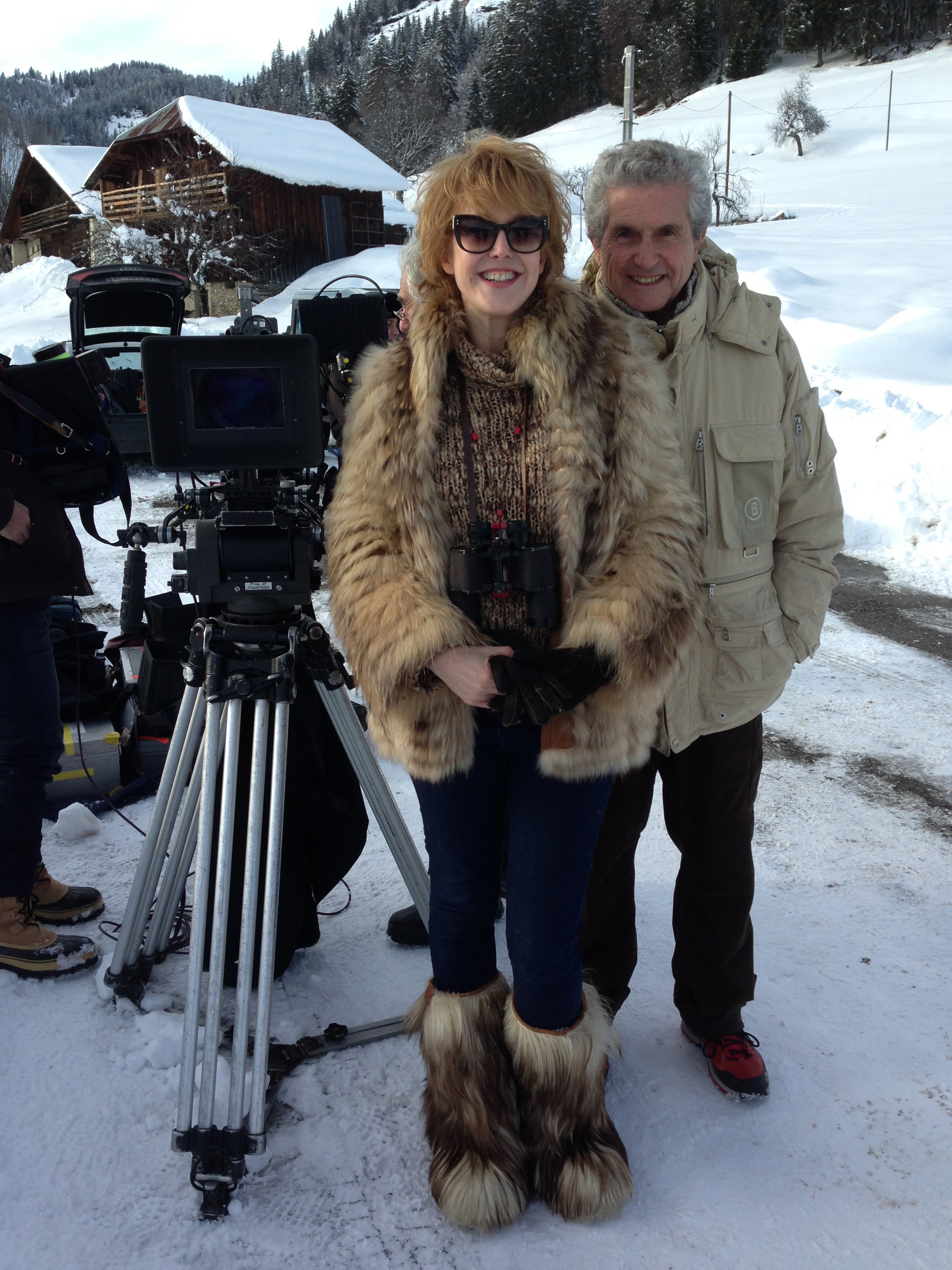
On the set of Salaud, on t'aime directed by Claude Lelouch, in 2014

Soral next appeared on television, getting her breakthrough role six years later in the crime drama So Long, Stooge (1983), a film also directed by Claude Berri where she co-starred with Coluche. For her performance as a wayward punk girl, Soral was nominated to the César Award for Best Supporting Actress and the César Award for Most Promising Actress, though she won neither.

Soral's subsequent work included starring roles in the comedies Réveillon chez Bob (1984) and Twist again à Moscou (1986), the science fiction film Diesel (1985), the drama I Love You (also 1986) and the crime film Bleu comme l'enfer (still 1986). Later on, she played mostly supporting roles in film, also appearing in many television series and working in theatre.

== Personal life ==
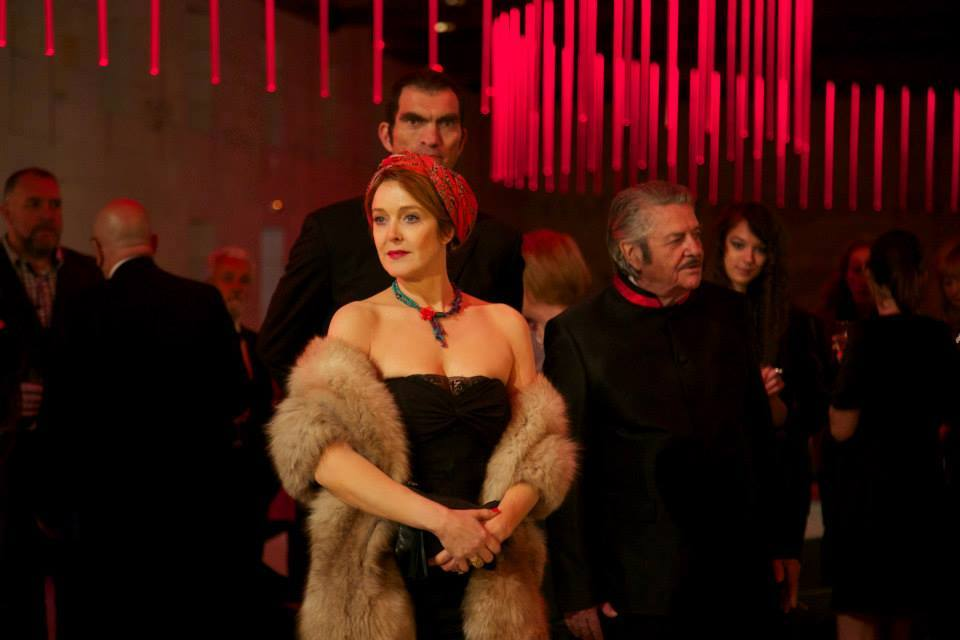
On the set of Calomnies directed by Jean-Pierre Mocky, in 2014

Soral is the mother of two daughters. She is a committed environmentalist and, since the 2000s, has been actively involved in a charity that supports the struggle against deforestation and the interests of Amazonian indigenous people.

She is the younger sister of author Alain Soral. During the 1980s, after she achieved prominence as an actress, she allowed him to use her stage name (not yet her legal name) as his pen name. Alain Soral initially gained some fame as a self-styled Marxist and an antifeminist provocateur, before evolving into a well-known far-right, antisemitic ideologue, conspiracy theorist and Holocaust denier. Agnès Soral has condemned her brother's views; they have been estranged since the 2000s. In 2015, she published the book Frangin (French slang for Brother) which recounted her family history and her relationship with her brother.

== Theatre ==
Year	Title	Author	Director	Notes
1976	Voyage avec la drogue et la mort	Dimitris Kollatos	Dimitris Kollatos	Théâtre d'Art
1982	Un garçon d’appartement	Gérard Lauzier	Gérard Lauzier	Théâtre Marigny
1990	Des journées entières dans les arbres	Marguerite Duras	Jean-Luc Tardieu	
1991	Calamity Jane	Jean-Noël Fenwick	Jacques Rosny	Théâtre Montparnasse
1991	La Facture	Françoise Dorin	Raymond Gérôme	Théâtre des Bouffes-Parisiens
1993	Train de vie	Nathalie Mongin	Agnès Soral	Théâtre du Chaudron
1994	Chantecler	Edmond Rostand	Jérôme Savary	Théâtre national de Chaillot
1995	Dawn town project	Mike Rimbaud	Charlélie Couture	
1995	Assemblywomen	Aristophanes	Jean-Luc Tardieu (2)	
1998	Château en Suède	Françoise Sagan	Annick Blancheteau	Théâtre Saint-Georges
2000	Cat on a Hot Tin Roof	Tennessee Williams	Patrice Kerbrat	Théâtre de la Renaissance
2001	Mr Puntila and his Man Matti	Bertolt Brecht	Daniel Benoin	Comédie de Saint-Etienne
2004	Agnès Soral, c’est pas du Ronsard	Jacques Pessis & Agnès Soral	Éric Métayer	Festival d'Avignon
2004	Un beau salaud	Pierre Chesnot	Jean-Luc Moreau	Théâtre de Paris
2005	Les Héritiers	Alain Krief	Jean-Pierre Dravel & Olivier Macé	Théâtre Rive Gauche
2007	Agnès Soral aimerait bien vous y voir	Jacques Pessis & Agnès Soral	Jean-Luc Moreau (2)	Comédie de Paris
2012	La Chieuse	Patrice Dard & Jean Franco	Philippe Hersen	Comédie-Caumartin
2016	Sœurs malgré tout	Armelle Jover	Raymond Acquaviva	Théâtre Tête d'or
2020	Toâ	Sacha Guitry	Anne Bourgeois	Théâtre Tête d'or

== Selected filmography ==
Year	Title	Role	Director	Notes
1977	Un moment d'égarement	Françoise	Claude Berri	(first film role)
1977	Un comique né		Michel Polac	TV Movie
1977	Brigade des mineurs		Claude Loursais	TV Series (1 Episode)
1978	Surprise Sock	Charlotte	Jean-François Davy	
1978	Les héritiers	Béatrice	Juan Luis Buñuel	TV Series (1 Episode)
1979	Cinéma 16	Paula	Daniel Moosmann	TV Series (1 Episode)
1980	Caméra une première		Jacques Fansten	TV Series (1 Episode)
1980	Cinéma 16	Claire	Patrick Jamain	TV Series (1 Episode)
1981	Minitrip	Valérie	Pierre Joassin	TV Movie
1983	So Long, Stooge	Lola	Claude Berri	Nominated - César Award for Best Supporting Actress; Nominated - César Award for Most Promising Actress
1983	Zone rouge	The Woman	Robert Valey	TV Movie
1984	Réveillon chez Bob	Florence	Denys Granier-Deferre	
1984	Série noire	Anne Letellier	Raymond Vouillamoz	TV Series (1 Episode)
1985	Diesel	Anna	Robert Kramer	
1985	Le caprice de Marion	Marion Dachary	Jacques Tréfouel	TV Movie
1986	I Love You	Hélène	Marco Ferreri	
1986	Killing Cars	Violet Blum	Michael Verhoeven	
1986	Bleu comme l'enfer	Carol	Yves Boisset	
1986	Twist again à Moscou	Tatiana	Jean-Marie Poiré	
1988	Love and Fear	Sabrina	Margarethe von Trotta	
1988	Prisonnières	Nicole Beck	Charlotte Silvera	
1989	Australia	Agnès Deckers	Jean-Jacques Andrien	
1989	Fantômes sur l'oreiller	Elisabeth Labarge	Pierre Mondy	TV Movie
1989	Bonne espérance	Prudence Beauvilliers	Pierre Lary & Philippe Monnier	TV Series
1989	The Free Frenchman	Nellie Planchet	Jim Goddard	TV Mini-Series
1989	Mon dernier rêve sera pour vous	Nathalie de Noailles	Robert Mazoyer	TV Mini-Series
1990	Après après-demain	Sophie	Gérard Frot-Coutaz	
1990	Sésame, ouvre-toi !	Manuelle	Serge Le Péron	TV Movie
1993	Window to Paris	Nicole	Yuri Mamin	
1993	Tout va bien dans le service	Claire	Charlotte Silvera (2)	TV Movie
1993	Prat et Harris	Prat	Boramy Tioulong	TV Movie
1994	Le ballon d'or	Isabella	Cheik Doukouré	
1994	Target of Suspicion	Chandreau	Bob Swaim	TV Movie
1994	Maigret	Aline Bauche	Andrzej Kostenko	TV Series (2 Episodes)
1996	Men, Women: A User's Manual	Fabio Lini's Girlfriend	Claude Lelouch	
1996	The Ogre	Rachel	Volker Schlöndorff	
1996	Oui		Alexandre Jardin	
1996	Catherine the Great	Countess Bruce	Marvin J. Chomsky & John Goldsmith	TV Movie
1996	L'embellie	The Prostitute	Charlotte Silvera (3)	TV Movie
1997	C'est la tangente que je préfère	Sabine's Mother	Charlotte Silvera (4)	
1997	Un étrange héritage	Sabine Castel-Fortin	Laurent Dussaux	TV Movie
1998	Ça n'empêche pas les sentiments	Odette	Jean-Pierre Jackson	
1998	Comme une bête	Claudia	Patrick Schulmann	
1998	Je suis vivante et je vous aime	Lucie	Roger Kahane	
1998-2003	Blague à part	Isabelle Dumont	François Greze, Pascal Chaumeil, ...	TV Series (60 Episodes)
2001	Les gens en maillot de bain ne sont pas (forcément) superficiels	Anita	Éric Assous	
2001	Un homme à défendre	Marthe Rambal	Laurent Dussaux (2)	TV Movie
2001	Joséphine, ange gardien	Ariana	Dominique Baron	TV Series (1 Episode)
2002	Les filles, personne s'en méfie	The Editor	Charlotte Silvera (5)	
2003	Livraison à domicile	Marylin's Aunt	Bruno Delahaye	
2003	Le passage	Marion	Charlotte Walior	Short
2003	Drôle de genre	Dominique Bazin	Jean-Michel Carré	TV Movie
2003	L'affaire Martial	Jeanne Martial	Jean-Pierre Igoux	TV Movie
2003	Péril imminent	Valérie Monteil	Christian Bonnet	TV Movie
2003	Le Camarguais	Béa	William Gotesman	TV Series (1 Episode)
2003	Louis la brocante	Mathilde	Pierre Sisser	TV Series (1 Episode)
2004	Les parisiens	Pierre's Wife	Claude Lelouch (2)	
2004	L'Incruste	Josiane	Alexandre Castagnetti & Corentin Julius	
2004	Femmes de loi	Eléonore Destrée	Denis Malleval	TV Series (1 Episode)
2005	Le courage d'aimer	A Spectator	Claude Lelouch (3)	
2005	L'antidote	Nadine Marty	Vincent De Brus	
2005	Retiens-moi	Barbara	Jean-Pierre Igoux (2)	TV Movie
2005	La voie de Laura	Rachel	Gérard Cuq	TV Movie
2006	Beyond the Ocean	The White	Éliane de Latour	
2006	Les Brigades du Tigre	Mademoiselle Amélie	Jérôme Cornuau	
2006	Camping paradis	Béatrice	Didier Albert	TV Series (1 Episode)
2007	Confidences		Laurent Dussaux (3)	TV Mini-Series
2008	Sauvons les apparences !	Marie-Claire	Nicole Borgeat	TV Movie
2008	Sous le soleil	Lise Hamon	Adeline Darraux	TV Series (2 Episodes)
2009	Suite noire	Jules's Mother	Patrick Grandperret	TV Series (1 Episode)
2011	L'été des Lip	Suzanne Forestier	Dominique Ladoge	TV Movie
2011	À dix minutes de nulle part	Madame Roger-Maillon	Arnauld Mercadier	TV Movie
2011	Commissaire Magellan	Barbara Magellan	Étienne Dhaene	TV Series (1 Episode)
2011	Les invincibles	Savannah	Pierric Gantelmi d'Ille	TV Series (4 Episodes)
2012	Cassos	Mathilde	Philippe Carrèse	
2012	Par les épines	Madame Rose	Romain Nicolas	
2012	Des arêtes dans le bifteck	Marina	Patricia Dinev	Short
2012	Julie Lescaut	Anna Jensen	Christian Bonnet (2)	TV Series (1 Episode)
2012	L'heure du secret	Hélène Berthin	Elena Hazanov	TV Series (1 Episode)
2013	Pauvre Richard !	Madame Pélissier	Malik Chibane	
2013	Les petits joueurs		Guillaume Breton	Short
2013	Rouge Brésil	Eléonore Rouen	Sylvain Archambault	TV Mini-Series
2013	Myster Mocky présente		Jean-Pierre Mocky	TV Series (1 Episode)
2014	Salaud, on t'aime	Bianca Kaminsky	Claude Lelouch (4)	
2014	Calomnies	Kenou	Jean-Pierre Mocky (2)	
2014	Coup de coeur	Chantal	Dominique Ladoge (2)	TV Movie
2015	Nicolas Le Floch	Dame Cahuet de Villiers	Philippe Bérenger	TV Series (1 Episode)
2015	Le Sang de la vigne	Emilie Huguenin	Aruna Villiers	TV Series (1 Episode)
2019	La Vertu des impondérables	The Inspector	Claude Lelouch	
2020	Commissaire Magellan			TV Series (1 Episode)
2022	Plus belle la vie	Charlotte Gauthier	TV series (1 season)	
2022	Juliette dans son bain	Ariane	Jean-Paul Lilienfeld	TV movie
2022	Le Principal	Mrs Cebulla	Chad Chenouga	

== Publication ==
- Frangin, Michel Lafon, 2015, ISBN 978-2749924298
