= Vers la féminisation? =

1999 essay bt Alain Soral

Towards Feminisation? (Vers la féminisation?) subtitled « Deconstruction of an antidemocratic plot » ("Démontage d'un complot antidémocratique") is a combative essay on feminism published in 1999 by the French polemicist Alain Soral.

== Thesis ==
Soral starts from the position that women have always worked, for instance in the retail and agricultural sectors: the exception has been women at the top end of society. The invention of feminism will have been caused by boredom or rejection in respect of privileged women's conditions as housewives and mothers. In recent decades massive employment growth in the Tertiary (service) sector has provided a corresponding boom in employment opportunities for women. Provokingly, Soral distinguishes between two sorts of feminism, represented by the “flippées” such as Simone de Beauvoir and the “pétasses”, such as Élisabeth Badinter.

Soral asserts that the important problem concerns not the equality between men and women but rather, and not withstanding the social changes of recent decades, equality between rich and poor, a traditional Marxist struggle from which he says the feminists, mostly representative of the most privileged classes, are trying to divert attention.

For Soral « feminisation » is not so much a movement as an evolution supportive of the liberal capitalist economy. He points out that the appearance in the labour market of huge numbers of additional women contributes to salary stagnation. The fact that so many women earn salaries makes them [often] less critical and more committed as consumers than the men. Soral concludes that feminism is therefore a mask to conceal and sustain economic liberalism.

Soral sees homosexuality as a substitute for the “hysterical” response of a certain type of enraged feminist. He contends that the “liberation” of women and of homosexuals are historically and objectively allied, as evidenced by organisations (which he denounces) such as Act Up.

== Controversy ==
Critics accuse Soral of misogyny or homophobia, although he has always rejected these contentions.

The Paris-based journalist Éric Zemmour has published an anti-feminist book of his own, entitled “The first Sex” (“Le Premier Sexe”). Soral's withering response, on his website, was to invite potential readers to “prefer the original to the copy” Soral's implicit condemnation of the Zemmour book for its lack of originality must nevertheless be set against the way that Soral's own work was heavily influenced by the Marxist philosopher and sociologist Michel Clouscard.
