= Jack Cohen =

Jack Cohen may refer to:

- Jack Cohen (biologist) (1933–2019), British biologist and special effects consultant
- Jack Cohen (politician) (1886–1965), British Conservative Party politician, Member of Parliament for Liverpool Fairfield 1918–1931
- Jack Cohen (businessman) (1898–1979), British businessman, founded Tesco
- Jack Cohen (rabbi) (1919–2012), American Reconstructionist rabbi

== See also ==
- John Cohen (disambiguation)
- Jacob Cohen (disambiguation)
