= Patrick Klugman =

French lawyer and politician

Councillor of Paris
- Incumbent
- Assumed office March 2008
- Mayor: Bertrand Delanoë; Anne Hidalgo

President of the UEJF
- In office 2001–2003

Personal details
- Born: 11 July 1977 (age 49) Neuilly-sur-Seine, France
- Education: Panthéon-Assas University; Paris Dauphine University
- Profession: Lawyer

Patrick Klugman (born 11 July 1977) is a French attorney at the Paris bar and a politician. He is a former president of the Union des étudiants juifs de France (UEJF, Union of French Jewish students), and is an anti-racist activist.

== Biography ==
=== Professional career ===
Patrick Klugman was born on 11 July 1977 in Neuilly-sur-Seine. He studied law at Panthéon-Assas University and Paris Dauphine University, where he completed a postgraduate course under the direction of Marie-Anne Frison-Roche. He was sworn in at the bar in 2004. In March 2007 he joined the offices of the attorney Francis Szpiner, whom he supported in court during the second sitting of the Sohane Benziane case. In 2006, he was one of the attorneys in the case of the murder of Chaib Zehaf.

In October 2008, he founded the firm PK Avocats with Pierre-André Pascaud. As an attorney he was particularly involved in criminal cases with media coverage, such as those aimed at the Socialist deputy Julien Dray. He was one of the attorneys for Jamel Leulmi, who was sentenced to 30 years in prison in a criminal case with some media coverage. He also represented in France the family of Gilad Shalit, a French-Israeli hostage released on 18 October 2011 after more than five years of captivity at the hands of Hamas. Patrick Klugman was also the lawyer of the writer Yann Moix, of Georges-Marc Benamou, Father Patrick Desbois, actor Omar Sy, designer Ito Morabito, essayist Caroline Fourest, writer Bernard-Henri Lévy and the FEMEN.

In 2005 he took up the cause of jailed Russian oligarch Mikhail Khodorkovsky. With his colleague, François Saint-Pierre, he pleaded for the Zehaf family in the case known as the "murder of Oulins" by developing the theory of a racist murder. This theory was rejected by the assizes of the Rhone in January 2009. Patrick Klugman was also the lawyer of the SOS Racisme association in several cases. Patrick Klugman was the counselor of Loïk Le Floch-Prigent, the former CEO of French oil giant Elf, who was imprisoned on 15 September 2012 in the cells of the gendarmerie in Lomé, Togo, and charged with fraud.

=== Political career ===
An associate of Bertrand Delanoë, for whom he voted at the Reims Congress, Patrick Klugman was elected to the Council of Paris in the 17th arrondissement in the elections in March 2008. He appeared in second place among the "openness" group on the municipal list of the Socialist Party, led in this district by the deputy Annick Lepetit. Since then, he has joined the Socialist Party and is vice president of the Socialist, Radical and Left group in the Council of Paris. In the Council of Paris he often speaks on issues related to public freedom and international relations. He sits in the 9th Committee (culture and international relations). Patrick Klugman supported François Hollande for the presidential election of 2012 and the citizen primaries that preceded it. He supported Anne Hidalgo for mayor of Paris during the municipal elections of 2014 in Paris. He was named after his election on 5 April 2014 as assistant for International Relations and the Francophonie.

== Media activities and positions ==
=== Anti-racist militant ===
Patrick Klugman was a member of the national office, then vice president of SOS Racisme. He was known for strong positions against quotas and ethnic statistics, and for strengthening secularism. He actively participated in the campaign against using DNA testing for prospective immigrants under the family reunification program. In 2003–04 he was representative in France of the Geneva initiative, which offered an alternative approach to peace between Israelis and Palestinians.

Previously, Patrick Klugman was known during his tenure as President of the UEJF (2001–03) for his active contribution to recognition of the resurgence of anti-Semitism in France. This was illustrated by the positions that were both Republican ("son of Abraham and of Marianne") and iconoclastic ("I am a Zionist and pro-Palestinian"). Patrick Klugman was also a co-opted member of the Steering Committee of the Conseil Représentatif des Institutions juives de France (Representative Council of French Jewish Institutions).

As President of UEJF, he participated in writing two books: The antifeujs, the White Paper of anti-Semitic violence in France and Zionism explained to our friends.

In The Affair of the Gang of Barbarians he called for opening the closed doors so the case could be tried with a more extensive publicity.

=== Regular guest speaker ===
Between 2004 and 2008, when the show went off the air, Patrick Klugman was one of the regularly invited guests in the talk show N'ayons pas peur des mots (Let us not mince words) hosted by Samuel Étienne on I-Télé. Since then, he has often taken part in the live debate (Le Grand Direct) of the news every day at 13:15 pm hosted by Jean-Marc Morandini on Europe 1. (Note: Le Grand Direct has not been broadcast at 13:15 pm for several years.)

Since the beginning of 2010, Patrick Klugman appears every week in his blog titled Plaidoyers (Advocacy) on the website of the Règle du Jeu (Rule of the Game), a literary magazine founded and directed by Bernard-Henri Lévy. He also has a weekly slot on Friday morning at 8:20 am on radio RCJ. In addition, he often publishes opinion columns in daily newspapers.

=== Controversies ===
During the 2002 presidential elections, Patrick Klugman accused Jean-Marie Le Pen of plagiarizing Adolf Hitler, saying "By declaring that he was socially of the left and nationally of France, Jean-Marie Le Pen repeated the words of Adolf Hitler in November 1932 in his closing speech of the National Socialist Party Congress. Le Pen made his "coming out" and revealed his Hitlerite convictions". The same day, the daily Libération denied the information. This quotation of Hitler would never have existed as well as the Nazi congress of 29 November 1932.

Commenting on the withdrawal of Patrick Klugman from proceedings brought against Edgar Morin, the lawyer and essayist Gilles-William Goldnadel described Klugman as an "obsequious courtier".

On 26 February 2006 Patrick Klugman expelled deputy Philippe de Villiers from a demonstration in honor of Ilan Halimi. This behavior was strongly condemned by the Jewish community. In a letter addressed to Philippe de Villiers, the President of the Central Consistory, Jean Kahn, expressed "his condemnation of the behavior of those whom you so rudely rebuffed." The lawyer of the Consistory and of the Grand Rabbinate of France, Jean Alex Buchinger, notes that "such behavior [...] is even less acceptable in that it is targeting a son of a resistant who never failed to defend our Judeo-Christian values".

In Jacob Cohen's book Le printemps des sayanim (2010) the character "Sayan" appears under the name of Patrick Glukmann.

== Bibliography ==
- Les antifeujs, le livre blanc des violences antisémites en France, Calmann-Lévy, Paris, 2002
- le sionisme expliqué à nos potes, La Martinière, Paris, 2003
- Le livre noir de la garde à vue – parfait manuel du savoir-vivre en commissariat, Nova Press, Paris 2010
