= John Cohen =

John Cohen may refer to:

== Politicians ==
- John S. Cohen (1870–1935), U.S. Senator from Georgia
- John Cohen (Australian politician) (1859–1939), Australian politician and judge

== Others ==
- John Cohen (baseball) (born 1966), American baseball coach
- John Cohen (musician) (1932–2019), American folk musician and photographer/filmmaker
- John Cohen (psychologist) (born 1911), British psychologist, see Thinker's Library
- J. M. Cohen (John Michael Cohen, 1903–1989), British writer and translator

== See also ==
- Jack Cohen (disambiguation)
- Jonathan Cohen (disambiguation)
