= Jacob Cohen (writer) =

Moroccan-French writer and journalist

- Born: 15 August 1944 (age 82); Meknes, Morocco
- Citizenship: Morocco, France
- Education: Universities of Casablanca and Paris
- Occupations: Writer, journalist
- Years active: 2001-present
- Known for: Militant anti-Zionist views
- Notable work: Novels about the lives of Moroccan Jews
- Website: jacobdemeknes.blogspot.com

Jacob Cohen (born 1944 in Meknes, Morocco) is a Moroccan-French writer, journalist and former university lecturer of law. Member of the Jewish community in France, he has written several novels about the lives of Moroccan Jews, including their modern history, exile and emigration to Israel and France. For his views about Israel, he is known as a militant anti-Zionist.

== Life and career ==
=== Early life and education ===
Cohen was born into a Moroccan Jewish family and raised in the Jewish quarter (Mellah) of Meknes. He attended the Talmud Torah Elementary School and the Alliance Israélite in Meknes. He continued at the Lycée Yeshiva du Marshan in Tangier and the Lycée Moulay-Ismaïl in Meknes where he received his baccalauréat. He studied law at the university in Casablanca and, after a stay in Berlin and Montreal, graduated in Political Science in Paris, France. Following this, he was assistant professor at the law school in Casablanca from 1978 to 1987.

=== Political views ===
Since 1987, Cohen has been living in Paris as a member of the Jewish community in France and is known as a militant anti-Zionist. Among his critical views of Israeli politics and society, Cohen was quoted by the Morocco World News portal saying that the Israeli intelligence agency Mossad was active in Morocco. In another article by the same portal, Cohen was reported having condemned the "Zionist strategy" of instrumentalizing the Holocaust in order "to influence people around the world to justify the occupation of the Palestinian territories."

On 5 July 2012, Cohen was aggressed by members of the French section of the Jewish Defense League, an organization whose goal is to "protect Jews from antisemitism by whatever means necessary" and described as a "right-wing terrorist group" by the Federal Bureau of Investigation (FBI) in 2001. In 2014 Cohen participated in the conference “Israeli Apartheid Week”, held by the "Justice for Palestine Club" at the École de Gouvernance et d’Économie in Rabat. During this event, he raised doubts about the relations between Morocco and Israel, which he called a “non-innocent dialogue” with the intention to "legitimize the Israeli occupation of Palestine." Cohen further spoke about instances of racism in Israel, which he called "the Zionist regime", and his perceived inhuman treatment of Palestinians. In addition, he supported a boycott against Israel.

In July 2018, the French magazine Les Inrockuptibles announced that Cohen had left the extremly right-wing association Equality and Reconciliation (E&R), founded and lead by Alain Soral, of which Cohen had been a member for the last ten years. Cohen stated that he was leaving for personal conflicts with certain persons of the E&R.

=== Fiction writing ===
Besides opinion pieces in newspapers and social media, Cohen has written several novels in French. His first story Les noce du commissaire was published in 2001 by Editions Le Fennec and his Du danger de monter sur la terrasse by Tariq éditions, both in Casablanca. His other novels were published by L'Harmattan and other publishers in France. His novel Le Printemps des Sayanim, dealing with Jewish Mossad collaborators in France, was published in 2014 in a German translation.

== Works in French ==
- Les noces du commissaire. Casablanca: Editions Le Fennec. 2001. ISBN 9954-0-0056-9. OCLC 48993872.
- Moi, Latifa S. Paris: L'Harmattan. 2002. ISBN 2-7475-3196-1. OCLC 51221017.
- Du danger de monter sur la terrasse. Casablanca: Tarik éditions. 2006. ISBN 9954-419-34-9. OCLC 76971115.
- L'espionne et le journaliste: le Mossad mène le jeu. Paris: L'Harmattan. 2008. ISBN 978-2-296-05685-5. OCLC 471009895.
- Le printemps des Sayanim. Paris: Harmattan. 2010. ISBN 978-2-296-11284-1. OCLC 608164828.
- Le destin des soeurs Bennani-Smirès. Saint-Denis: Éd. Édilivre Aparis. 2011. ISBN 978-2-332-45035-7. OCLC 780277991.
- Dieu ne repasse pas à Bethléem. Paris: L'Harmattan. 2013. ISBN 978-2-336-00656-7. OCLC 853441831.
- Un pont sur le Détroit. Éd. Édilivre Aparis. 2013. ISBN 9782332655059.
- Le commando de Hebron. Saint-Denis: Kontre kulture. 2014. ISBN 978-2-36725-052-6. OCLC 902787773.
- O. P. A. Kabbalistique Sur les Nouveaux IndigÈnes. Independently Published. 2018. ISBN 978-1-9734-0483-5.
- Nouvelles judéo-maghrébines. Paris: L'Harmattan. 2023. ISBN 978-2-14-033229-6.
- Une ingénue à l'IMA. Paris: Independent. 2025. ISBN 979-8-29251-625-5.

== Reception ==
Some of Cohen's novels have been reviewed in Moroccan newsmedia, and his second novel Moi, Latifa S. was presented in a Spanish scholarly magazine. In 2014, Cohen was listed by the Moroccan magazine TelQuel as one of seven influential Moroccan Jews who "count on an international level."

His 2006 novel Du danger de monter sur la terrasse was reviewed by the Moroccan newspaper Le Matin. In this story, Esther, a Jewish girl in Meknes is abducted by Muslims, prompting her bereaved family to emigrate to Israel. After conversion to Islam and renamed Fatima, the grown-up woman marries and raises her only daughter Khadija. When Khadija later moves to Paris to become a medical doctor, she lives in an open society, but experiences social discrimination of immigrants like herself. – Commenting on the story, the review remarked its "simple and fluid style", with the author revealing the limitations of the notions regarding "respect for tolerance beyond all considerations of race, religion or cultural references."

A review of the seven short stories Nouvelles judéo-maghrebines in the Moroccan magazine Maroc Hebdo noted the many detailed and rich narrative descriptions of "the experience and feelings not only of Muslims living in France, but also of Moroccan, French and Israeli Jews." One of these stories takes place in the 1950s in a café of the mellah of Meknes, “where there were a few unbelievers who indulged in drink and gambling, deaf to the supplications of Chief Rabbi Toledano.” According to the review, Cohen described this setting as “a concession to the entry of Morocco into modernity.” Another story focuses on Maurice Bohbot, a traditional Moroccan Jew, who, after years living in France, returned to spend the evening of the Mimouna celebration in his former community. The story presents Maurice Bohbot as marked by Western Cartesian thinking and faced by his co-religionists "stuck in tradition, especially since there has been no renewal of generations. The young men all went abroad and never returned."
