= Jonathan Cohen =

Jonathan or Jon Cohen may refer to:

- L. Jonathan Cohen (1923–2006), British philosopher
- Jonathan Cohen (actor) (active since 2009), French actor
- Jonathan Cohen (conductor) (born 1977), British conductor and cellist
- Jonathan Cohen (musician) (active since 1967), British musician known from children's television programmes
- Jonathan Cohen (television executive) (active since 2009), American television executive
- Jonathan D. Cohen (born 1955), American neuroscientist
- Jonathan R. Cohen (active since 1986), American diplomat
- Jon Cohen (writer), American novelist and screenwriter
- Jon Cohen (entrepreneur), American music and media executive
- Jon Cohen (physician), American physician and business executive

== See also ==
- Jonathan Cohn (21st century), magazine editor
- John Cohen (disambiguation)
