= Frangin =

2015 book by Agnès Soral

- Author: Agnès Soral
- Language: French
- Subject: Alain Soral
- Publisher: Éditions Michel Lafon
- Publication date: 26 March 2015
- Publication place: France
- Pages: 288
- ISBN: 9782749924298

Frangin (French slang for Brother) is a 2015 book by the French-Swiss actress Agnès Soral.

== Summary ==
Frangin is a personal book about Agnès Soral's brother, the polemicist and publisher Alain Soral, who is associated with far-right politics because of his anti-capitalism, anti-Americanism and anti-semitism. It is about her struggles to comprehend his trajectory, their sibling relationship, and the negative social consequences his activism has had for her.

== Publication ==
Éditions Michel Lafon published the book on 26 March 2015.
