= Jacob Cohen =

Jacob Cohen or Ya'akov Cohen may refer to:

- Jack Cohen (businessman) (1898–1979), supermarket founder born Jacob Kohen
- Jacob Cohen (footballer) (born 1956), former Israeli international association football player
- Jacob Cohen (scientist), scientist at NASA Ames Research Centre
- Jacob Cohen (statistician) (1923–98), U.S. statistician and psychologist
- Jacob Cohen (writer) (born 1944); Moroccan-French writer and journalist
- Jacob I. Cohen Jr. (1789–1869), Baltimore banker and Jewish-rights activist
- Jacob Raphael Cohen (1738–1811), Jewish minister in England, Canada, and the United States
- Jacob Willem "Wim" Cohen (1923–2000), Dutch mathematician
- Jake Cohen (born 1990), professional basketball player with Maccabi Tel Aviv
- Ya'akov Cohen (born 1953), Israeli rabbi and politician
- Ya'akov Cohen (writer) (1881–1960), Israeli poet, playwright, and writer
- Rodney Dangerfield (1921–2004), U.S. comedian born Jacob Cohen
