= Equality and Reconciliation =

French association

- Égalité et Réconciliation
- Formation: 2007
- Headquarters: Saint-Denis, Seine-Saint-Denis, France
- Methods: conferences, manifestos
- Fields: Far-right and antisemitic activism
- President: Alain Soral
- Key people: Philippe Péninque; Dieudonné
- Website: www.egaliteetreconciliation.fr

Equality and Reconciliation (E&R; French: Égalité et Réconciliation) is a political association created in June 2007 by Alain Soral, former militant of the French Communist Party, who was also at that time a member of the central committee of the far-right National Front. Other founders are Jildaz Mahé O'Chinal and Philippe Péninque, two former activists of the Groupe Union Défense (GUD)

The political association describes itself as cross factional and "left nationalist", and states its intention to bring together "citizens who are part of the nation that determines political action and social policy which are the foundations of the Brotherhood, an essential component of national unity," and that it is "on the Left for work and on the Right for morals."

Most analysts describe the association as belonging to the extreme right and state that it is a breeding ground for future National Front activists. Several observers consider that it is antisemitic as it develops a strong discourse against Israel occupation of Palestinian lands and the supposed "Zionist expansionist ideology" and lobby in France. On February 14, 2023, the Global Project Against Hate and Extremism (GPAHE) released a report in which it classified Égalité et Réconciliation as a "conspiracy" and "antisemitic" group.

== Ideology ==
Defending the position of Alain Soral, the founder of the organisation, whose position can be summarised in the title of a text which he wrote: "Left of Labour, Right of morals", for a national reconciliation, Equality and Reconciliation advocates the union of the "Labour left" (Marxist) and the "Moral Right" (Nationalism and Patriotism) in response to capitalist globalization and its consequences which are considered harmful, on the model of the Proudhon Circle, which brought together trade unionists, anarchists, and Maurrassians.

Alain Soral's analysis criticised liberal financial capitalism and the involvement of traditional political parties in it. At the same time the Socialist Party and the UMP were the target of his attacks. Formerly from the French Communist Party, Alain Soral considers that this party collapsed after renouncing class struggle and because of the competition - in electoral terms - of the Trotskyites, represented especially by parties such as Workers Struggle and the League of Revolutionary Communists. They, notably Olivier Besancenot, according to him were complicit in the policies of Nicolas Sarkozy: sharing the same policy of "selective immigration" defended by Nicolas Sarkozy and demands for regularization of undocumented migrants from the extreme left, he accused Olivier Besancenot of supplying to Nicolas Sarkozy a "humanist alibi" to its "neoliberal" policy, which would make him a "useful idiot" for the system.

Also rejecting a "Federal" Europe, considered to be a "Trojan horse" of liberalism, he advocates a return to national sovereignty in order to implement a policy of "national preference" which would apply to "ethnic" French people and those who have immigrated who have become "integrated" and those born in France of foreign descent. He wants to rally opposition to the Treaty of Rome 2004 which established a Constitution for Europe, and is particularly opposed to the European Fiscal Compact.

Even if the FN, who are traditionally anti-communist, rejects the class struggle, E&R believes that the class struggle (of Marxism) and Poujadism (historical ideology of the FN) might get confused in a more general project of "defense of workers", the employees, and the owners of small businesses (SMEs).

Equality & Reconciliation therefore supports the FN and its president Marine Le Pen, while constituting an independent structure that wishes for a "patriotic" union with the disillusioned left, the "bobos" and victims of the "financial right". Some originators of the association, such as Frédéric Chatillon and Philippe Péninque are also close to Marine Le Pen.

The movement also expressed their approval of non-aligned countries, such as the Russia of Vladimir Putin (for whom they organized a welcoming committee during his visit to France in late 2009, in partnership with the Embassy of Russia and the French Russian community), the Venezuela of Hugo Chávez, Serbia, Iran, and Palestine. The movement opposes the French Zionists, who he accused of playing a game contrary to the interests of France and the French Jewish community. The movement also opposes feminists and is against women working outside the home.

== Activities ==
The association, which is present in most regions of France, offers many activities: militant, intellectual, cultural and sporting. If it was originally intended to become a political party (the transition was to have taken place in March 2010), they have finally renounced this idea, preferring to do politics differently.

The official website offers a press review and a review of videos available on the internet. A poster campaign was announced on 14 July 2008, the poster is composed of a slogan "Long live nationalism!" encircled by portraits of important contemporary political figures: Fidel Castro, Vladimir Putin, Hugo Chavez, Patrice Lumumba, and Thomas Sankara.

Alain Soral participated in 5th position, in the "anti-Zionist List" presented in the Ile-de-France region by Dieudonné for the 2009 European Parliament election, and received 1.30% of votes in the region.

In 2010, Equality & Reconciliation launched a poster campaign entitled "We want a French Chavez!", marking an ideological proximity and support for the Venezuelan President in his fight against "American imperialism".

== Universities ==
On 8 and 9 September 2007, at Villepreux, the first summer university of the association was held, organized by Marc George and which was attended by Dieudonné, Christian Bouchet, Jean-Marie Le Pen, Farid Smahi, Serge Ayoub, Jean Robin, also Giorgio Damiani, webmaster of Vox NR; and Ugo Gaudenzi, director of the Italian daily Rinascita. The event was also assisted by some former militants of GUD, such as Philippe Péninque and Jildaz Mahé O'Chinal.

A second University of the association took place at Villepreux on 1 and 2 November 2008. Alain Soral made a presentation on his trip to Serbia and closing remarks, Jacques Cheminade spoke on the global economic crisis and Christian Bouchet on geopolitics. Eight workshops were also organized, devoted to the EU against the nation, the economic line of E&R, Marx and the nation, the strategy of E&R, propaganda and activism, the French identity in 2008, communication tools available to the association, and cultural resistance.

== Membership ==
In March 2008, the association claimed 600 members, however Marc George, then national coordinator, announced in May of the same year "800 supporters and 300 paid up members." In September 2009, Alain Soral announced that the association had 800 members, mostly young. The association claimed the same number in spring 2012. E&R always maintains that 150 demonstrators marched in Paris under the banner of the movement on Labour Day, 1 May 2008, in the parade that the National Front organizes every year.

== Controversy ==
According to the blog "Extreme Rightist(s)" in February 2010, Marc George, secretary general of the movement, was dismissed from his post for publishing on the website of the Association a video looking at the Harkis apology and announcing a possible memorial to the death of François Duprat. He left the organization shortly after.
