= Ensemble Scolaire Jean-Baptiste de La Salle - Notre-Dame de la Compassion =

Coordinates: 48°55′58″N 2°21′18″E

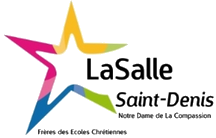

Information
- Type: Public high school

Ensemble Scolaire Jean-Baptiste de La Salle - Notre-Dame de la Compassion is a private Catholic school in Saint-Denis, Seine-Saint-Denis, France, in the Paris metropolitan area. It serves primary school through sixth-form college/senior high school (lycée).

As of 2014 about 2,400 students attend this school. The majority of the students were of recent immigrant origins.
