= Mike Rimbaud =

American guitarist, singer and painter

Mike Rimbaud is an American guitarist, singer and painter.

== Music career ==
Starting his career by performing in the cafes and clubs of New York City, Rimbaud signed in 1990 with a French record label. His debut album Mutiny in the Subway was recorded downtown at Baby Monster Studios with the help of Andrea Pennisi on percussion and Lee Kostrinsky on bass.

Rimbaud moved to Paris in 1991, he recorded his second album Funeral Lover in both New York (Baby Monster Studios) and Paris (Mixit Studio). In 1993, Elliott Murphy produced the third CD, Red Light. The original songs include "Romantic Depressive" and "You Looked Good in Hell." Returning to live in New York in 1994 (where he has resided since), Rimbaud continues to write and perform with his band, The Subway Sun. Rimbaud releases Graffiti Trees in 1997.

In 2002, Rimbaud recorded an acoustic album, Beast of Broadway with some songs produced by Brian Ritchie of the Violent Femmes. These songs were written in Brazil and New York and recorded in lower Manhattan. 2003 saw the release of Light of Day a tribute to Bruce Springsteen, with Rimbaud's rockabilly inspired rendition of Atlantic City. He also performed at the Stone Pony with other artists to help promote the CD. Between 2004 and 2008 Rimbaud continued to record and perform with his band The Subway Sun, this coincides with shows of his paintings, a series of over 50 portraits of Lower East Siders, portraits of American, French and Haitian Revolutionaries and paintings from Brazil.

Rimbaud has been compared to Bruce Springsteen, Elvis Costello and Gene Vincent among others, but his songwriting style and voice have always been unique. Although his career has remained in the underground, he has continued to be a prolific songwriter sometimes commenting on current events with his songs such as; "Stimulus Baby", "Katrina Comes Again", "Saving Up to Go Bankrupt" and "Mother Nature's Nervous Breakdown." He also speaks about New York life, "King of Staten Island," and relationships, "You Make Love Like War," "Girlfriend Lost and Found." As a performer, he has toured Europe and the US with his band as well as a solo artist.

Rimbaud regularly exhibits his paintings, his subject mater include cityscapes, dinosaurs, subway scenes and burlesque dancers. In 2010 he releases a 16 track CD, What Was I Thinking? and music video for his song "Miami High". A 6-CD box set, "An Underground Life in NYC" was also released in Europe in 2010, distributed by Sony.

In summer 2011, Rimbaud puts out his 7th album, Coney Island Wave includes the singles, "Dance with A Mermaid" and "Every One Needs a Daddy" with a video filmed in Nashville. Also in 2011, Rimbaud released an album of cover tunes, "Can't Judge a Song By Its Cover" where he interprets Phil Ochs, The Beatles, Bob Marley, Jobim, among others. He also put out "Soundtrack for a Human Being," a compilation of his songs, including the new "One Percent Feeling Lonely." In 2012 Rimbaud's song "Saving Up To Go Bankrupt" was included on the "Occupy This Album" collection, benefiting the Occupy Wall Street movement. "Night Rainbow" inspired by hurricane Sandy and the Occupy movement was released in February 2013. Rimbaud made several music videos for "Night Rainbow" including, "Rainbow Tonight," "Sandy Must be Crazy," "Jackhammer Jones," and "Robin Hood in Reverse." In 2014 Rimbaud released an original take on Led Zeppelin's classic "Stairway to Heaven" as a single, including a music video, he also recorded a cover of the 1950s hit "Love Is Strange." In September 2014 Rimbaud released his latest 10-song album, "Put That dream in Your Pipe and Smoke It," recorded in New York City and released on Subway Sun records. The first music video from the album is called "Frequent Flyer Subway Rider."

== Discography ==
1. Put That dream in Your Pipe and Smoke It, 2014
2. Night Rainbow, 2013
3. Coney Island Wave, 2011
4. Can't Judge a Song By It's [sic] Cover, 2011
5. Sound Track for a Human Being, 2011
6. What Was I Thinking, 2010
7. An Underground Life in NYC (6-CD box set), 2010
8. Beast of Broadway, 2003
9. Graffiti Trees, 1997
10. DawnTown Project, 1995
11. Red Light, 1993
12. Funeral Lover, 1991
13. Mutiny in the Subway, 1990
