= Alain Soral =

French author and conspiracy theorist

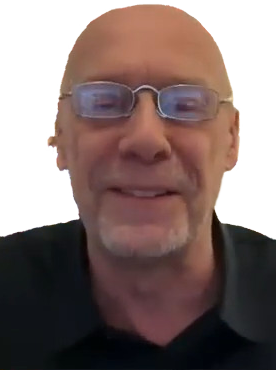
- Soral in 2026
- Born: Alain Gérard Robert Guy Bonnet; 2 October 1958 (age 68); Aix-les-Bains, France
- Other names: Alain Bonnet de Soral; ABS
- Occupations: Author; Publisher; Political activist
- Known for: antisemitism, antifeminism, conspiracy theories and Holocaust denial
- Spouse: Maylis Bourdenx (1996–2009)
- Relatives: Agnès Soral (sister)

Alain Gérard Robert Guy Bonnet (French pronunciation: [alɛ̃ ʒeʁaʁ ʁɔbɛʁ ɡi bɔne]; born 2 October 1958, Aix-les-Bains), known professionally as Alain Soral (pronounced [alɛ̃ sɔʁal]), is a far-right French-Swiss author, publisher, ideologue, conspiracy theorist, activist and filmmaker.

From the 1990s, Soral gained fame in France for his essays and media interventions on seduction, relations between men and women and other social issues, though his antifeminist views and other provocative stances caused some controversy.

A self-professed Marxist, initially considered far-left, he evolved towards the far-right during the 2000s and eventually joined the National Front which he left after two years. Having created his own political movement, Égalité & Réconciliation (Equality and Reconciliation), he espoused openly antisemitic positions, associating himself with comedian-turned-activist Dieudonné. He also became one of France's most influential conspiracy theorists.

Soral has been convicted multiple times of hate speech, both in France and in Switzerland, mostly for antisemitism but also for Holocaust denial and homophobia. In 2026 he relocated to Russia to avoid imprisonment in both countries.

== Early life ==
Alain Bonnet was born in Aix-les-Bains (Savoie). His father was a French-Swiss notary and legal advisor. His family, which has roots in Soral, Switzerland, has long used "Bonnet de Soral" as an unofficial name. He grew up in the suburbs of Annemasse (Haute-Savoie), where he attended primary school. When Soral was in his early teens, his family moved to Meudon in the Paris area so that he could attend a private Catholic high school, the Collège Stanislas de Paris.

Soral later described his family as highly dysfunctional. In a 2004 interview, he said he had been "programmed to be a monster". His sister Agnès said that their father was a "narcissistic pervert" who mistreated his wife and beat his children. In 1973, their father was sentenced to prison for fraud in Switzerland. The family faced financial ruin and had to leave the Paris area for Grenoble, later returning to Annemasse.

He spent two years working odd jobs before being accepted, aged 20, into the École Nationale Supérieure des Beaux-Arts, one of the few tertiary educational institutions he could attend without having the baccalauréat. He studied there for two years. He attempted for a time to become a painter, using the name "ABS". He was then taken in by a family of academics, who encouraged him to enroll at the École des Hautes Études en Sciences Sociales where he attended lectures given by Cornelius Castoriadis.

== Career ==
=== Early writings and filmmaking ===
Aspiring to be a writer, Soral frequented Parisian "trendy" circles during the early 1980s. His younger sister Agnès Soral, who gained prominence as an actress during the same period, allowed him to use her stage name as his pen name so he could benefit from her fame.

In 1984, following his studies, Soral co-wrote with Hector Obalk and Alexandre Pasche Les Mouvements de mode expliqués aux parents ("Fashion trends explained to parents"), a humorous essay about the "sociology" of 1980s fashion and assorted youth subcultures. The book was a success at the time, but only Obalk was invited to promote it on the talk show Apostrophes. Soral deeply resented Obalk for taking all the spotlight. He later commented that he had been "manipulated by a Jew [Obalk]" and that this had prompted him to "study the Talmud" and realize that "betrayal and solidarity" were at the foundation of Jewish culture. Obalk and Pasche disputed Soral's version and stated that Obalk had been the book's primary author.

The book's success gave Soral the opportunity to be employed at ESMOD, where he gave a course on "clothing sociology". He made his first television appearance in 1985, as a fashion expert. He later appeared as a panelist on TV shows. According to his own account, he devoted much of his free time to be a pickup artist. In 1991, he published his first novel, Le Jour et la nuit ou la vie d'un vaurien ("Day and night, or the life of a scoundrel"), a fictionalised autobiography which sold poorly. Soral then became interested in a filmmaking career. He directed two commercials, then two short films with a stint as a reporter in Zimbabwe between them.

In the early 1990s, Soral joined the French Communist Party. His then-friend Simon Liberati, who also joined at the time, later said that he and Soral were just being eccentrics, since the communist party was collapsing electorally and becoming members could be perceived as original. During the same period, Soral worked for L'Idiot international, a controversial newspaper founded by Jean-Edern Hallier. He wrote columns in the young women's magazine 20 Ans and also worked for the gossip magazine Entrevue.

Soral became interested in Marxist thinkers. In 1992, he was a guest on Mireille Dumas' TV show Bas les masques to discuss his experience as a pick-up artist and his vision of love. This led him to publish in 1996 the book Sociologie du dragueur ("Sociology of the pick-up artist"), which he described as a "Marxist analysis of seduction". Also in 1996, he appeared in Catherine Breillat's film Parfait Amour!, in a supporting role as a "macho hoodlum".

In 1999, Soral published another polemical essay, Vers la féminisation? – Démontage d'un complot antidémocratique ("Towards feminisation? – Analysis of an antidemocratic plot"), in which he argued that feminism and the resulting "feminization" of society were a tool of capitalist oppression. Scholar Mickaël Studnicki later analyzed Soral's book as an early emergence of masculinist discourses in France.

Soral then developed Confession d'un dragueur ("Confessions of a pickup artist"), his first feature film as a director, purportedly based on his own experiences. Released in 2001, it was a commercial and critical fiasco. The film's producer said that he had only realized belatedly that the statements found in the script about male-female relations were serious rather than ironic. Soral later commented that the failure of his film had been caused by "Jews and faggots", though he claimed that it had since become a "cult film".

=== Media fame ===
Returning to writing, Soral published Jusqu'où va-t-on descendre? – Abécédaire de la bêtise ambiante ("How far down are we going? – ABC's of ambient stupidity", 2002), followed by Socrate à Saint-Tropez (2003) and Misères du désir (2004). During the late 1990s and early 2000s, Soral was a regular guest on French talk shows where he frequently caused controversy with his diatribes against feminism, capitalism, contemporary social liberalism (which he called "libertarian liberalism"), the liberal elite and modern society in general. Libération called him in 2002 a "left-wing reactionary". At the time, Soral professed to be a disciple of Marxist theorist Michel Clouscard, to whom he had borrowed the concept of "libertarian liberalism". Clouscard initially endorsed Soral, but later rejected their association after Soral evolved towards the far-right.

Soral's 2002 book Jusqu'où va-t-on descendre? included a jibe at comedian Dieudonné, whom he found too biased against "common" French people. Dieudonné then sought to meet Soral: the two men eventually became friends, having found, according to Soral, a common ground on "anti-Zionism" and the "Jewish lobby".

During the 2000s, Soral, who presented himself as a sociologist, claimed to oppose communitarianism and stated that the "liberal-libertarian" ideology promoted by the French moderate left had imported anglo-saxon communitarianism into France, including its "feminist", "gay", and "regional" subdivisions. On the contrary, he commended the Muslim community for its ability to produce "men raised in values".

Before Soral's discourse began openly antisemitic, his analysis of communitarianism already included remarks about the Jews. He commented that in France, "all forms of growing communitarianism (gay, Islamic, etc.) form and strengthen through imitation of, hostility towards and opposition to Judeo-Zionist communitarianism, whose privileged status constitutes the communitarian jurisprudence by which their claims against the Republic are supported".

=== Far-right radicalization ===
In the course of the 2000s and 2010s, Soral's views and public persona became increasingly associated with antisemitism. In 2004, he was interviewed in a segment on the television newsmagazine Complément d'enquête devoted to Dieudonné's radicalization. While Dieudonné nodded in approval in the background, Soral said:

When you're talking with a Frenchman who is a Zionist Jew, and you start to say, well maybe there are problems coming from your side, maybe you might have made a few mistakes, it's not always the fault of other people if no-one can stand you wherever you go… because that's basically their general history, you see… for 2,500 years, every time they settled somewhere, after about fifty years or so, they got their arses kicked. Surely something strange here ! It's as though everyone is wrong except them. And the guy will start barking, yelling, going mad… you can't carry on with the conversation. Which, to sum it all up, tells you that there's a psychopathology with Zio-Judaism, something that verges on mental illness…

Following this interview, one of Soral's book signings was disrupted by Jewish activists, with several people being wounded in the resulting brawl.

In 2007, Soral openly embraced the far-right by joining the National Front, in order to contribute to Jean-Marie Le Pen's campaign for the upcoming presidential election. He tried to place social issues as well as elements of Marxist analysis in the program of the party (historically strongly opposed to communism), even claiming that "nowadays, Marx would vote for Le Pen".

Also in 2007, Soral founded his own political association, Égalité & Réconciliation (Equality and Reconciliation), which aimed to attract working-class and disadvantaged voters. At the same time, he also launched a publishing company, Kontre Kulture, which he used to publish himself and other controversial authors. In November 2007, he became a member of the National Front's central committee.

In February 2009, Soral left the National Front after Marine Le Pen refused to let him lead the party's list at the European Parliament election. Soral and Dieudonné then headed an "anti-Zionist list" which included far-right, far-left, Shia Muslim and Holocaust denial activists and won 1,3% of the vote in Île-de-France. Soral later acknowledged that the list had been funded with the help of Iran.

During the following years, Soral built a network of structures and businesses dedicated to promote his ideas while also benefiting him financially. No longer invited by the French mainstream media after his move to the far-right, he turned to the Internet where he became particularly influential. He published countless viral videos of himself discussing various topics; his movement's website became one of the most popular French-language sources of "alternative" information. Soral's association with Dieudonné also helped him gain in influence. His book Comprendre l'Empire (Understanding the Empire, 2011) was one of the best-selling essays in France in 2012 and 2013. In the course of the 2010s, he came to be perceived essentially as a far-right, antisemitic ideologue. He became one of the most active and famous French conspiracy theorists, notably promoting the theories about 9/11. He called the 2012 Toulouse and Montauban shootings a "joint French-Israeli operation" aimed at discrediting Muslims, and a "low-budget version of 9/11".

In 2013, Soral started calling himself a "national-socialist", though he claimed that he did not mean that in the usual sense. He later claimed that he was not antisemitic but "judeophobic" and was merely opposed to the "Zionists". Soral also became a proponent of Holocaust denial: he and Dieudonné associated with denier Robert Faurisson and introduced his ideas to a new, younger audience. When Faurisson died in 2018, Soral paid tribute to him.

In 2014, Soral and Dieudonné announced their intention to create a new political party, "Réconciliation nationale" (National Reconciliation), but this did not materialize. In 2016, Equality and Reconciliation was reported to have about 4500 members Soral and his supporters notably organized paid survivalist and training camps in France. Soral also developed his movement's activities in Switzerland, especially after he moved there in 2019.

In 2016, Soral was a guest speaker at an event about the rise of alternative media and subsequent decline of mainstream media, organized by Rossiya Segodnya in Moscow. While in Russia, he praised Vladimir Putin's government as a "model". His visit was endorsed by nationalist ideologue Aleksandr Dugin.

In 2017, Soral and his movement were banned from Facebook for violating the platform's rules on racism and homophobia. In 2020, they were banned from YouTube for hate speech.

In 2019, it was reported that Soral's influence was waning in his political environment and that he was being criticized by younger conspiracy theorists, as his credibility had been damaged by his excesses and his tendency to profit financially from his political discourses.

Since the October 7 attacks, Soral has consistently voiced an anti-Israel position, comparing French-Israeli IDF soldiers to "those Frenchmen who went to fight for Daesh" and decrying what he sees as the National Rally's pro-Israel positions.

In April 2026, after relocating to Russia, Soral granted an interview to TASS where he compared himself to general de Gaulle relocating to London during World War II, called France a "satellite" of Israel and the United States, and called for the "communautarist supremacist mafia" to be "defeated".

== Legal issues ==
Over the years, Soral has been sentenced multiple times for offences generally related to hate speech, including antisemitism, homophobia and Holocaust denial. On 10 February 2005, the Paris correctional court sentenced him to a €10,000 fine for racist insults against Jewish journalist Frédéric Haziza. In 2015, he was again found guilty of public insults against Haziza. In February 2016, he was again fined €10,000 for antisemitic insults, still against Haziza.

In May 2015, Soral was fined €10,000 for publishing a photo of himself making a "quenelle" (an offensive gesture popularized by Dieudonné) in front of the Berlin Holocaust Memorial.

In November 2016, Soral was found guilty of threats against a model of African descent. After they flirted online and she turned him down, she was harassed by Soral's online community. He was fined €6000, plus €5000 of damages.

On 17 January 2019, Soral was sentenced to one year in prison for antisemitic hate speech, and for contempt of court after he had insulted the prosecutor during another trial. On 15 April, he was sentenced to another year in prison for Holocaust denial as a result of a cartoon published on Égalité et réconciliation's website. In June 2020, that sentence was reduced on appeal to a €5000 fine.

In October 2019, Soral received yet another one-year sentence for having called the Panthéon a "Kosher garbage site" following Simone Veil's burial there. Around that time, he moved to Lausanne, Switzerland, to avoid imprisonment in France.

In September 2020, he was fined €134,000 for inciting to racial hatred, after he had disregarded a previous court ruling regarding the publication of the 1892 book Salvation through the Jews, by Léon Bloy. In October 2020, he was fined €5400 for accusing the Jews of being behind 9/11. In May 2021, he was sentenced to four months in prison after he blamed them for the Notre-Dame fire.

In January 2022, he was fined €22,500 for posting another photo of himself making a "quenelle", this time in front of a courthouse.

In December 2022, Soral was sentenced to 3 months imprisonment by the regional attorney general for Lausanne for defamation, discrimination, and incitement to hatred for calling Cathy Macherel, a Swiss journalist who had reported on his movement, a "fat lesbian pro-migrants activist" and a "queer", which he said translated in French as "degenerate". Soral contested the sentence in court and was initially able to avoid jail time, but was convicted in court of defamation and ordered to pay 9000 francs. However, the Vaud public prosecutor's office lodged an appeal and in October 2023 Soral was convicted of discrimination and incitement to hatred and sentenced to 2 months imprisonment.

During the COVID-19 pandemic, Soral published numerous videos where he named French Jewish political figures as responsible for the situation, called the Jews "satanic parasitic predator perverts" and said people should "arm themselves" against "the enemy". He was charged in France for incitement to insurrection and racial hatred. In September 2025, he was sentenced to one year in prison over these statements.

In July 2025, an investigation was opened in France against Soral for incitement to terrorism and apology for terrorism after he had participated to a pro-Iran Telegram channel named after the Axis of Resistance, where he was said to have praised the October 7 attacks. Investigators suspected him of being involved in an Iranian operation aimed at destabilizing France.

In late February 2026, Soral relocated to Moscow to avoid imprisonment in France and Switzerland. On 19 March 2026, he received prison sentences in both countries: in France, he was found guilty of conspiracy due to his association with Iranian agents and sentenced to two years; in Switzerland, he was sentenced to five months for antisemitic and homophobic statements.

== Personal life ==
Soral married Maylis Bourdenx in 1996, though they later divorced.

Soral's younger sister, actress Agnès Soral, has denounced his views and they became estranged during the 2000s. In 2015, she published the book Frangin (French slang for Brother) which recounted their relationship and family history.

According to his sister, Soral also became estranged from their mother during the 1990s, citing a need to "reconstruct himself".

A savate and boxing practitioner, Soral was also for a time a licensed boxing instructor. He has published a DVD of his own savate tutorials.

== Publications ==
- Les Mouvements de mode expliqués aux parents, with Hector Obalk and Alexandre Pasche, Éditions Robert Laffont, 1984 ISBN 978-2221213636
- Le Jour et la nuit ou la vie d'un vaurien (novel), Calmann-Lévy, 1991 (reissued under the title La vie d'un vaurien, Éditions Blanche, 2001) ISBN 978-2953988017
- Sociologie du dragueur, Éditions Blanche, 1996 ISBN 978-2367251844
- Vers la féminisation? Démontage d'un complot antidémocratique, Éditions Blanche, 1999 ISBN 978-2911621567
- Jusqu'où va-t-on descendre? Abécédaire de la bêtise ambiante, Éditions Blanche, 2002 (reissued under the title Abécédaire de la bêtise ambiante, Pocket, 2003) ISBN 978-2367252001
- Socrate à Saint-Tropez: Texticules, Éditions Blanche, 2003 ISBN 978-2846280624
- Misère(s) du désir, Éditions Blanche, 2004 ISBN 978-2846280815
- CHUTe! Éloge de la disgrâce, Éditions Blanche, 2006 ISBN 978-2846281386
- Comprendre l'Empire, Éditions Blanche, 2011, ISBN 2-84628-248-X
- Chroniques d'avant-guerre, Éditions Blanche, 2012, ISBN 978-2846283007
- Dialogues désaccordés, combat de Blancs dans un tunnel, with Éric Naulleau, Éditions Blanche - Hugo & Cie, 2013, ISBN 978-2755612745
- Yacht People 1: Quenelle en haute mer (comics, with Dieudonné, art by Zéon), Kontre Kulture, 2012 ISBN 978-2367250076
- Yacht People 2: Au-dessus, c'est le soleil (comics, with Dieudonné, art by Zéon), Kontre Kulture, 2014 ISBN 978-2367250489
- Comprendre l'époque : Pourquoi l'égalité ?, Kontre Kulture, 2021. ISBN 978-2367251608
- Plus con, tu meurs!, Kontre Kulture, 2024. ISBN 978-2367251967

== Filmography ==
=== Director ===
- 1990 : Chouabadaballet, une dispute amoureuse entre deux essuie-glaces (short)
- 1993 : Les Rameurs, misère affective et culture physique à Carrières-sur-Seine (short)
- 2001 : Confession d'un dragueur (feature film, starring Saïd Taghmaoui and Thomas Dutronc)

=== Actor ===
- 1996 : Parfait Amour!, directed by Catherine Breillat: Philippe
- 2012 : L'Antisémite, directed by Dieudonné: The producer

== Notes ==
a: Most analysts describe Alain Soral as belonging to the extreme right. He is the president of Equality and Reconciliation, a far-right organisation that promotes antisemitic, misogynist and homophobic ideas.
