= Michel Clouscard =

French Marxist philiosopher and sociologist (1929–2009)

- Born: August 6, 1928; Montpinier, France
- Died: February 21, 2009 (aged 80); Gaillac, France

Philosophical work
- Era: 20th-century philosophy
- Region: Western philosophy
- School: Continental philosophy Western Marxism
- Main interests: Politics, economics, sociology, history
- Notable ideas: Criticism of libertarian liberalism

Michel Clouscard (French: [kluskaʁ]; August 6, 1928 – February 21, 2009) was a French Marxist philosopher and sociologist. A critic of the evolution of ideas of progress confronted with the liberal mutations of the end of the 20th century, his work is linked to the thought of Rousseau, Hegel and Marx, whose links and unity he shows. He is known to have philosophically shown the collusion between capitalism and French theory, represented by Lévi-Strauss and Deleuze, constructing his own concept of neo-Kantianism. He developed philosophical research around the idea of the social contract, postulating that "the constitutive principle of any society is the relation between production and consumption".

His contribution aimed at providing a conceptual basis for thinking about a democratic and autonomous political philosophy that would allow for the overcoming of the management of wealth, nations and the political education of citizens by the capitalist class.

== Biography ==
Clouscard's early life was dominated by athletics. He was preselected to compete in the 200 meters race at the 1948 London Olympics.

Clouscard's graduate studies in letters and philosophy under the tutelage of Henri Lefebvre culminated with a thesis, Being and the Code (L'Être et le Code; published 1972), presented to Jean-Paul Sartre, among others, for defense. Despite Clouscard's sharp criticism of the phenomenologist Husserl, Sartre commented "Being and Code shows a very ambitious undertaking. But in my opinion, it is this very ambition that makes the book valid (...) It is a true totalization (rather than totality), as it accounts for everything, even the individual (...) Its great merit is to show the best conditions for history to reveal itself concretely for what it is: an ongoing totalization.” This work will give rise to a lifetime of research and writing to develop his work and extend it to the study of French society from 1945 to the present day.

Clouscard was a professor of sociology at the University of Poitiers from 1975 to 1990, where he was influenced by his colleague, Jacques D'Hondt, a specialist in Hegel.

In the early 1970s, Michel Clouscard developed a critique of libertarian liberalism.

He retired to Gaillac to write the end of his work, which is still partly unpublished.

He died during the night of February 20–21, 2009, at his home, from Parkinson's disease.

== Philosophical work ==
According to Clouscard, the "capitalism of seduction" with its libertarian liberal face arises from the very evolution of the capitalist mode of production. It testifies to a qualitative jump of the accumulated quantities which, at a certain moment, reach a libertarian structure of society.

With its libertarian face, liberalism achieves its own self-realization, until the inevitable catastrophe. Clouscard speaks then about neofascism.

Drawing up the inventory of fixtures of the liberal counter-revolution's consequences, Clouscard produced a philosophical work to think and propose the basis of a new social contract and to enable a progressivist re-foundation.

=== Critique of libertarian liberalism ===
From the beginning of the 1970s, Michel Clouscard developed a critique of libertarian liberalism (libéralisme libertaire). He studies the change in the socio-economic structure in Europe since 1945 and develops a conceptualization of the new capitalist political economy.

According to him, at the time of Karl Marx, industry had not reached the stage of light industry which allows the production of the gadget, the libidinal object and makes the study of frivolity an essential data to analyze contemporary production. With the appearance of the mode of production of series, a qualitative change on the objects and the stakes of the production imposes to develop again the critique of the political economy of Karl Marx. And from then on, to understand the ideological inflection of the capitalist society passed from a repressive moral doctrine to a permissive moral doctrine. It is the passage from the austerity imposed to all under the traditional repressive fascism to the austerity of the post-May 68 period where the cultural models have changed: the permissiveness serving as a currency to disguise the economic oppression of the working class in the "new society" of the unfettered enjoyment. The ideological consequences and the contradictions linked to this model prepare a new fascist repression of the contradictions, as Pier Paolo Pasolini also pointed out in The Hippies’ Speech, an "extremely right wing fashion" of the "long-haired".

Clouscard thus understands social evolution as a historical whole in the making. He relates the permissive evolution of social morality to the needs of a new mercantile order of capitalism – the need to create new markets and to continue the economic oppression of the working class. He determines the economic and mercantile function of the promotion of new cultural models in advertising ideology to save capitalism in crisis.

Transgressive and libertarian emancipation is not criticized here from the point of view of the individual or civil society as an untouchable monad, but as part of a social body. In the logic of a political philosophy of the State, the incitement to overthrow the "established order" by culture (Maoism) and the "imagination in power" of May 68, without changing the bases of the society, allowed the creation of new markets. That is, the "liberated" consumption of goods or services produced through the continued oppression of the working class. According to bourgeois ideologists, "free enjoyment" would lead to the individual freedom of workers "playing the game", despite the alienation of the fruits of their labour power (the extortion of surplus value). A rhetoric of diversion, according to this author, which brings to light a strategy of management of the social contradictions.

=== The Metamorphoses of the Class Struggle ===
Being and Code is thus the conceptual basis of reference for his later study of French society. The understanding of the codification of the social body according to the being-code relation and through the dialectic of the frivolous and the serious provides the key to freeing the history of France before 1789 from a one-sided celebration of only the progressive aspects of the Enlightenment (struggle for rationalisation). On the contrary, an examination of the Encyclopedists' cautious and measured political conceptions of the Ancien Régime provides an example of their ideological positioning and epistemology, especially anthropological. Positivist materialism, naturalism is certainly in opposition to the absolutist ideology that is theocracy of divine right, but a figure like Voltaire shows the real horizon of the intellectual elites of the bourgeoisie. Indeed, on the eve of the French Revolution, the bourgeoisie of money and culture managed to share the same "libertine" culture with the nobility.

For Clouscard, the Enlightenment elites certainly carry industrialization and rationalization which will be one of the ideological bases of the end of the political hegemony of the nobility and the clergy. But without real critical discourse on the mode of production of wealth and on social issues. The political background of Diderot's team is a constitutional monarchy, that is to say a democratic and tax-based rationalization of the management of the relations of domination. This is why Rousseau is isolated: The Social Contract clearly claims the Republic. The seizure of power by the Third Estate under the rule of the bourgeoisie is as much the result of the strategy of integration and power sharing as it is the result of an ideological understanding of the ascendant social classes that will assume the management of society. Genesis of the abstract, ideological universality of the Human Rights.

=== The critique of the new "libertarian" alienation in the capitalist regime ===
In order not to make the obvious misinterpretation of reading his work as hostile to social progress, it must be made clear that Clouscard only analyses how the evolution of the capitalist mode of production and its political survival after 1945 lead to a new consensus between left-libertarians, liberals and social democrats, which he calls "libertarian liberalism". The social contradictions (post war famine, devastated industry, recession, etc.) having led to the adoption of a new model of society described by the author in The Metamorphoses of Class Struggle, the study of morals is then necessary to account for the mutations of industrialized societies.

His sociological study leads Clouscard to relativise the ideological enthusiasm of the elites of the new intelligentsia that wants to identify the softening of the moral repression of the models of society and the triumph of the soft revolution of capitalism, capable of dissolving the blockings and the inhibitions (Freudo-Marxism of Herbert Marcuse). The ideological codification exalting the new "libertinism" of the Sixties is explained in his work by the progressive integration of new social strata (Clouscard constructs the concept of middle strata, different from middle classes) – the new middle strata – to the techno-bureaucratic management system of the new social democratic management of capitalism. The connivance between the intelligentsia of the "new left" and the "new right" then expresses the duality of complementarity of the interests and members of the "financial bourgeoisie" and the new middle strata, which are in as ambiguous a situation in relation to the current proletariat as the bourgeoisie of 1789 was with the rest of the Third Estate In the preface to the second edition of Being and Code, the author writes :

"The books that will be devoted to the current French society show the outcome of this history of France: May 68, the perfect liberal counter-revolution, that of modernity that hides the "new reactionary""

=== From social struggles in a market economy to neo-fascism ===
Thus, the critical analysis of the social progress during the 20th century cannot be valid as a moral criticism of the emancipation of women or young people, but as a critical analysis of the creation of new markets by the softening of moral repression. The deceptive powers of capitalism (advertising communication, etc.) precede the individual who attaches himself to models of "emancipated" behaviours that "liberate the body" without liberating either the soul or the labour power of the individuals of the Collective Worker forced to exploit themselves to participate in the system of signs of enjoyment.

Social struggles are thus exploited and instrumentalised by the very form of society. Aided by the tremendous gains in productivity allowing for the industrial production of subsistence and capital goods, the market economy finds commercial outlets for social demands, but in a regime of social inequality. The poorest have access to the same cultural models as the richest, but while the working class is still exploited to produce and only has access to minimal frivolous consumption – sometimes only the most modest signs – the new middle and bourgeois strata consume much more without producing and have access to the luxury "range" of the new products: leisure, travel, luxury organic products, marginal and alternative lifestyles, moralising contestation of capitalist relations, etc.

=== Animation and management at the service of seduction capitalism ===
Animation and management are the populist and demagogic side of the new libertine culture of the dominant classes which promises enjoyment to the working class and generates a consensual discourse of diversion to demobilise the political fight of the workers. The originality of this ideology is certainly constituted by the abandonment of the great and problematic collective narratives that oblige to take into account the social classes. For the first time, the ideological production focuses on creating a collective narrative of the emancipation of the individual within a new libertarian and benevolent society. The problems of work are not addressed from a collective perspective but by targeting the individual. This culture (participation and discourse) that rejects class struggle, tends to mask or minimise the importance of class differences, covers the real by what Clouscard designates and conceptualises as a "seduction", resurgence of sophistry for new targets:

"Seduction is the power of language independently of the concept, independently of wisdom. At a given moment, a discourse can appear that has the power to annihilate being: it is the discourse of appearance, the discourse of seduction. Truth as such is then covered."

=== The levels of initiation to civilization and capitalist exploitation ===
In his study of the anthropology of modernity, Capitalism of seduction (Le Capitalisme de la séduction), Clouscard reveals his critique of the ideology of libertarian social democracy. Written in the wake of the election of François Mitterrand, when Jack Lang was Minister of Culture, this work gives an account of the new permissive education that shapes the existential and conceptual horizon of youth to bring to the workplace not collective claims but individual delusions. Traditional society assumed participation in laborious tasks and an apprenticeship in work as a principle of reality, but the new civilisation abolishes the reference to pain and merit in everyday life. In the past, emancipation also coincided with integration into the workplace, but Clouscard shows that as capitalism targets and develops new markets, namely women and young people, "emancipation" begins much younger. He thus denounces the ideological function of worldly feminism: the working woman must claim the right to exploitation and denounce her working class husband as a "phallocrat", leading to a civil war in the working class. At the same time, the "young man", who consumes without being productive, can accuse the working-class father of lacking breadth of vision. A link of symbolic exchange is then established with the objects which condense the ideological promises, the phantasmatic of the advertising ideology and the initiation to the civilisation of the merchandise: the new capitalist civilisation produces a new alienation which must thus be studied. The study of the frivolity is determining to understand the new struggle of the classes and Clouscard develops a methodology that criticises but borrows from the modernity of Lévi-Strauss, when he says: "The ones that accepted everything of Lévi-Strauss, for whom the system of the kinship is structural of the intersubjectivity, will not accept that the occidental intersubjectivity also raises a system of kinship... [instituted by the bourgeoisie]. Could it be because the Westerner is more "civilised"?"

The overall arrangement is that of a new social contract between debonair bourgeois parents and "emancipated" but "autonomous" children. Moreover, the soft incitement by the presence of the new goods that are the signs of the "look" (the jeans), the relational (the band that completes the "nocturnal" education that the family cannot provide), the mechanical animation of the body (binary rhythms, harmonies of the "psychedelic" impressionism), the emancipating mode of leisure ("cannabis", sexual relations), the regulation of the contradictions and the selection of the most resistant (the enjoyment offers traps that are addictions, anomie, etc.)

This mechanism is conceptualised as the emergence within mercantile society of a "free" distribution of commodities and signs, of emancipatory discourses and cultural models, but at the cost of the political submission of workers for the immediate and "naturalised" consumption of the new commodities of light industry capitalism. And for the poorest, the consumption of signs of wealth (sunglasses) but not of their reality (a week in Miami): the imaginary is so pervasive, the system of "cultural" meanings so marked out, that Clouscard summarises and conceptualises the operation as the "potlatch of a part of the surplus value" in the direction of the working class: a marginal share of the surplus value extorted from adult workers (especially men) served as seed capital for the creation of new markets in the direction of future exploited workers (youth and women). Through the soft and progressive incentive, the new capitalist political economy has gone forward: an economy whose commodities and consumption patterns are addictive. Clouscard names this prostitutional economy in the book Refondation progressiste face à la contre-révolution libérale. Above all, the "potlatch of a share of the surplus value" corresponds to the "soft" oppression of neo-capitalism and tends to complement, or even take over from, the mere extortion of surplus value, which used to describe the objective situation of the working class in twentieth century capitalist society. Victorian morality codified a situation immanent to the objective conditions of austerity, while libertarian anti-morality codifies the negation of the proletariat by another part of the working class (the workers): the new middle classes.

=== The contradiction of libertarian liberalism: the crisis, return of the repressed ===
"Capitalism swung to the left politico-culturally and swung to the right economically and socially"

Michel Clouscard denounced this drift of the market economy at a time when the cycle of alternating recession and recovery introduced unemployment and austerity as a structural horizon for workers, and in particular for the working class, and thus allowed a part of the "over-numbered" and weakened working class to find an outlet in the leisure industry and the "prostitutional economy". In 1983, Clouscard finished Le Capitalisme de la séduction :

"The crisis will reveal the deep nature of this system: austerity (economic repression on the workers, essentially the working class) has as its corollary not only the maintenance, but the expansion of "libertarian" social-democratic consumption. It was in the midst of this crisis that the ideology of the computerisation of society in the service of conviviality was born. As austerity worsens, the turnover of the leisure, tourism and pleasure industry increases. The two seem to be in direct opposite correlation. Social democratic "libertarian" enjoyment has as its requirements: productivism, inflation, unemployment, etc."

== Quotations ==
- "Marx exclusively devoted himself to the study of the concentration of possession: capital, because it is the principle of political economy. We will propose the study of the drift of accumulation like the principle of phenomenological knowledge for studying the change of the bourgeoisie of free enterprise into the bourgeoisie of services and functions of liberal society. Thus we will reveal an enormous unvoiced comment, that of the genealogy of this liberal society."
- "Neofascism will be the ultimate expression of libertarian social liberalism, of the unit which starts in May 68. Its specificity holds in this formula: All is allowed, but nothing is possible. The permissiveness of abundance, growth, new models of consumption, leaves the place to interdiction of the crisis, the shortage, the absolute impoverishment. These two historical components amalgamate in the head, in the spirit, thus creating the subjective conditions of neofascism. From Cohn-Bendit (libertarian leftist) to Le Pen (French extreme nationalist), the loop is buckled: here comes the time of frustrated revanchists.”
- "The State was the superstructural authority of capitalist repression. This is why Marx denounces it. But today, with globalisation, the inversion is total. Whereas the nation state could be the means of oppression of a class by another, it becomes the means of resisting globalisation. It is a dialectical process."

== Works ==
- Of Being and Code (L'Être et le Code), Éditions Mouton, 1972; reprinted by L'Harmattan, 2004, reprinted by Delga, 2019 (ISBN 978-2-7475-5530-2).
- Neo-fascism and ideology of desire, 1973; reprinted by Le Castor Astral, 1999; reprinted by Delga 2008, (ISBN 978-2-915854-10-7).
- Le Frivole et le Sérieux, Albin Michel, 1978; reissued by Delga, 2010 (ISBN 978-2-915854-20-6)
- Le Capitalisme de la séduction – Critique de la social-démocratie, Éditions sociales 1981, Réédition Delga 2006, (ISBN 978-2-209-05457-2).
- The Wild Beast, Metamorphosis of Capitalist Society and Strategy, Éditions sociales, 1983.
- De la modernité : Rousseau ou Sartre, Messidor / Éditions sociales, 1985.
- Les Dégâts de la pratique libérale ou les métamorphoses de la société française, Nouvelles Éditions du Pavillon, 1987.
- Traité de l'amour fou. Genèse de l'Occident, Scandéditions-Éditions sociales, 1993, (ISBN 978-2-209-06862-3).
- Les Métamorphoses de la lutte des classes, Le Temps des Cerises, 1996, (ISBN 978-2-84109-071-6).
- Refondation progressiste face à la contre-révolution libérale, Éditions L'Harmattan, 2003, (ISBN 978-2-7475-5307-0).
- Critique du libéralisme libertaire : Généalogie de la contre-révolution,1986, Re-edition 2006, Delga, (ISBN 2-915854-01-7).
- The production of the "individual", Delga, 2011, (ISBN 978-2-915854-27-5).
- Les chemins de la praxis, ontological foundations of Marxism, Paris Delga, 2015, (ISBN 978-2-915854-79-4)

== See also ==
- Criticism of libertarianism
