= Frédéric Chatillon =

French businessman and politic activist (born 15 February 1968)

- Born: 15 February 1968 (age 58)
- Occupation: Businessman
- Known for: Former communications adviser to Marine Le Pen

Frédéric Chatillon (born 15 February 1968) is a French businessman. He worked as the communications adviser to former National Rally president Marine Le Pen.

== Biography ==
Chatillon has been a "friend and confidant" of Le Pen since they were at law school together. As a student, he was president of Groupe Union Défense, a far-right student group.

Judges Renaud Van Ruymbeke and Aude Buresi are investigating Chatillon for alleged "illegal financing" of the Front National.

French newspaper Le Monde, as part of the Panama Papers investigation reported that Chatillon had used his company to set up an international network of shell companies and false invoices. On his Facebook page, Chatillon wrote, "obviously, the Front National has nothing to do with this private affair, neither directly or indirectly". The complex scheme is alleged to involve companies in complex system involving companies in Hong Kong, Singapore, Panama and the British Virgin Islands.

The press allegations have been dismissed by the online news portal Atlantico as mere libels and politically oriented news.

== Personal life ==
Frédéric Chatillon is separated from Marie d’Herbais de Thun, born in 1971, friend of Marine Le Pen, daughter of Pierre-Guillaume and Katherine d'Herbais de Thun, one of the Cendrine Blot-Le Chevallier (born Chéreil de la Rivière) sisters.
