= Guillaume Faye =

French political activist and essayist (1949–2019)

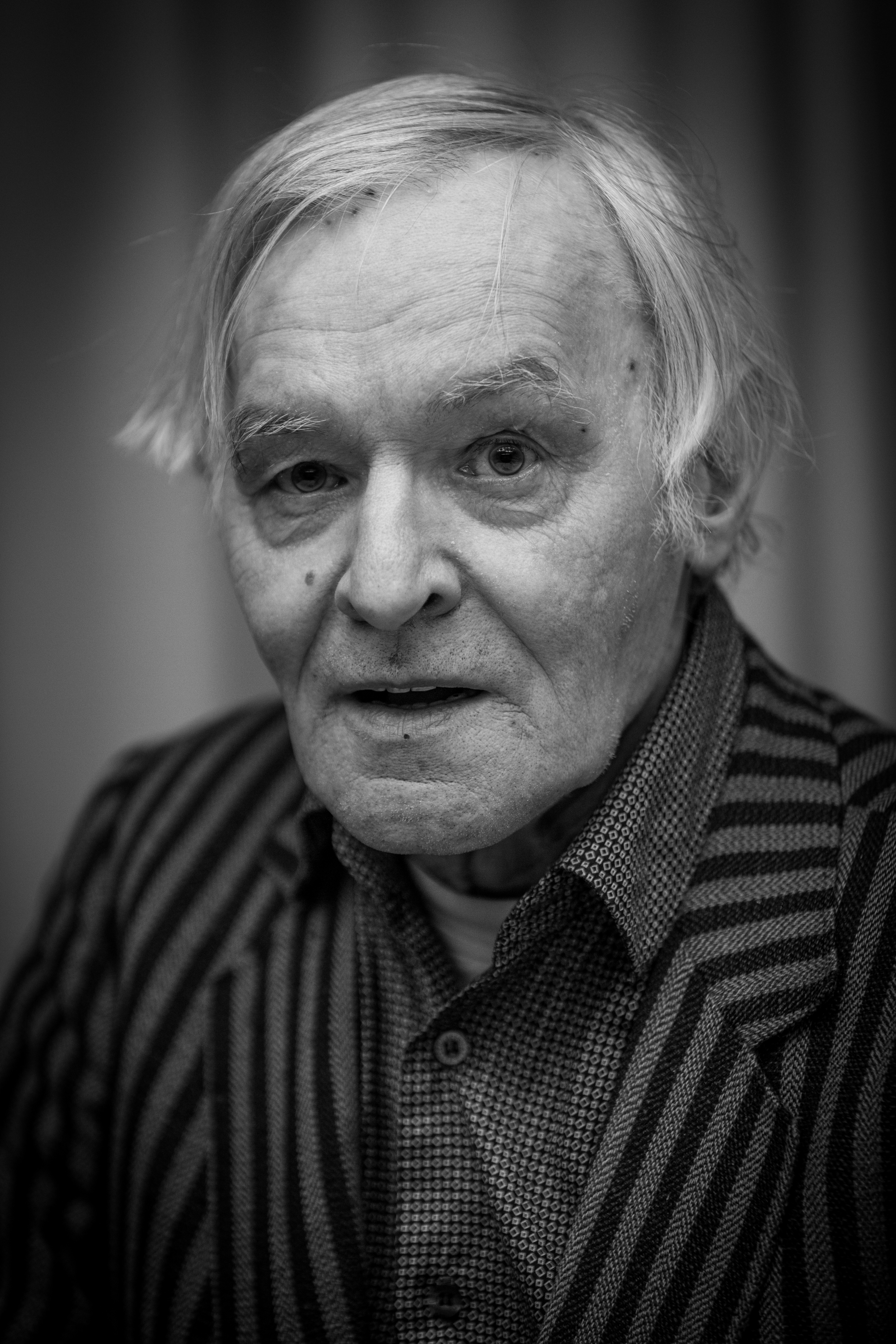
- Faye in 2015
- Born: 7 November 1949; Angoulême, France
- Died: 6 March 2019 (aged 69); Paris, France

Philosophical work
- Notable works: Archeofuturism (1998), Why We Fight (2001)
- Notable ideas: New right Futurism

Guillaume Faye (French: [ɡijom faj]; 7 November 1949 – 6 March 2019) was a French political theorist, journalist, writer, and leading member of the French New Right.

Continuing the tradition of Giorgio Locchi, his various articles and books sought to posit Islam as a nemesis necessary to unite the white non-Muslim peoples of Europe and the former Soviet Union into an entity named "Eurosiberia". Faye considered regional and national grievances to be counterproductive to this goal and was supportive of European integration.

Scholar Stéphane François describes Faye as "pan-European revolutionary-conservative thinker who is at the origin of the renewal of the doctrinal corpus of the French Identitarian Right, and more broadly of the Euro-American Right, with the concept of 'archeofuturism'", a theory advocating the reconciliation of technoscience with "archaic values".

== Biography ==
=== Early life and education ===
Guillaume Faye was born on 7 November 1949 in Angoulême from a family close to the Bonapartist right. He attended the Paris Institute of Political Studies, where he ran the student's associations Cercle Pareto and Association GRECE between 1971 and 1973.

=== GRECE ===
On the advice of Dominique Venner, Faye joined GRECE in 1970, an ethno-nationalist think tank led by Nouvelle Droite thinker Alain de Benoist. He soon became the head of movement's Secretariat for Research and Studies, and one of the major Nouvelle Droite theorists. Faye wrote at that time for many New Right journals such as Éléments, Nouvelle École, Orientations, and Études et Recherches. From 1978, he became a promoter of the strategy of "metapolitics" embodied by GRECE, although he eventually failed his project of entryism within the mainstream right-wing newspaper Figaro Magazine.

After intellectual and financial disagreements with de Benoist, Faye was marginalized in GRECE. He is said to have been ousted from the think tank in late 1986, although his departure was only officially announced in August 1987 via a letter wrote by Pierre Vial to the newspaper Le Monde.

=== Media career ===
Faye then distanced himself from political activism and became actively involved with the media industry. Between 1991 and 1993, he worked as an entertainer under the name of 'Skyman' at the urban radio station Skyrock. He was also a journalist at L'Écho des Savanes and VSD, and appeared on the France 2 talk-show Télématin. Faye taught the sociology of sexuality at the University of Besançon, and he has also claimed to have acted in pornographic films.

=== Return to political activism ===
"In a society that considers all genuine ideas subversive, which seeks to discourage ideological imagination, and which aims to abolish thought in favour of spectacle, the main goal must be to awaken people’s consciences, raising traumatising problems and sending ideological electroshocks: shocking ideas."

— Faye (1998/2010)

Faye went back to political activism in 1998 with the publication of his book Archeofuturism, followed in 2000 by The Colonization of Europe. The latter, criticized as "strongly racist" by de Benoist, earned him a criminal conviction for incitement to racial hatred. Faye organized conferences with GRECE sympathizers, Monarchists, Traditional Catholics and neo-Pagans. At the request of de Benoist, however, he was excluded once again from GRECE in May 2000.

Faye then became close to Terre et Peuple, a neo-Pagan movement founded in 1995 by former GRECE members Pierre Vial, Jean Mabire and Jean Haudry, but he was also expelled in 2007 after the publication of his book The New Jewish Question ('La Nouvelle Question Juive'), regarded within some revolutionary-nationalist and Catholic traditionalists circles as too overly "Zionist". In 1999 and 2002, he was invited to speak at conferences organized by the Club de l'Horloge, a national-liberal think tank led by Henry de Lesquen.

Faye died on 6 March 2019, after a long battle with cancer. While his death received limited media coverage in the mainstream press, he was praised by many far-right activists, including Jean-Marie Le Pen, Dan Roodt, Daniel Friberg, Greg Johnson, Jared Taylor, Richard Spencer, and Martin Sellner.

== Ideas ==
=== GRECE period (1970–1987) ===
A key concept of Faye's thought is that paganism – viewed as a quasi-ideal object aligned on the cosmic order that allowed for a holistic and organic society – is a rooted and differentialist religion, and thus a solution to the dominant "mixophile" and universalist worldview of the West. Faye has also participated in the diffusion of an identity defined as biological and cultural. In 1979, he argued that immigration, rather than immigrants, should be combated in order to preserve cultural and biological "identities" on both sides of the Mediterranean Sea.

His first books, published in the early 1980s, developed a rejection of the consumerist society and the standardization and Westernization of the world, one of Faye's intellectual constants. For him, a multiracial society is by essence "multiracist", and he has called for the return of non-European immigrants to their respective "civilizational areas". In 1985, Faye stated that Zionist "opinion circles" in France had forced the French government to break ties with the Ba'athist regime of Saddam Hussein, and he has denounced "Zionist lobbies" in the US that wished to influence geopolitics in favour of Israel. After his return to politics in the late 1990s, however, Faye reversed from his pro-Arab position and became a supporter of Israel as a potential political ally of circumstance against Arabs and Muslims.

=== Later period (1998–2019) ===
Through several books Faye published from the late 1990s onward, which he conceived as an appeal to the "ethnic awareness" of Europeans, Faye became an important ideologue of nativism and advocated a form of racialism that scholar Stéphane François has described as "reminiscent of the 1900s to the 1930s". The "ethnic foundations of a civilization", Faye argued, "rest on its biological roots and those of its peoples." He has also made references to the "loyalty to values and to bloodlines", promoted natalist and eugenicist politics to resolve Europe's demographic issues, and adopted a racialist Darwinian concept of the "struggle of the fittest", regarding other civilizations as enemies to be eliminated.

Faye believed the West to be threatened by its demographic decline and decadent social fabric, by a supposed ethnoreligious clash between the North and the South, and by a series of global financial crisis and uncontrolled environmental pollution. To avoid the announced civilizational and ecological collapse, Faye has promoted an authoritarian regime led by a "born chief", a charismatic and providential man protecting the people's identity and ancestry, and taking the right decisions in emergency situations. Faye also condemned what he has called "ethnomasochism", defined as the self-hating of one's own ethnic group. In Why We Fight, originally published in 2001, Faye defined 'metapolitics' as the "social diffusion of ideas and cultural values for the sake of provoking profound, long-term, political transformation."

"Archeofuturism", a concept coined by Faye in 1998, refers to the reconciliation of technoscience with "archaic values". He argues that the term "archaic" should be understood in its original Ancient Greek, that is to say as the 'foundation' or the 'beginning', not as a blind attachment to the past. According to Faye, anti-moderns and counter-revolutionaries are actually mirror-constructs of modernity that share the same biased linear conception of time. Defining his theories as "non-modern", Faye was influenced by Friedrich Nietzsche's concept of eternal return and Michel Maffesoli's post-modern sociological works. Political scientist Stéphane François has described archeofuturism as a combination of "post-modern philosophy, some elements of Western counterculture, and racism."

This, Faye himself argues, can only proceed in a manner similar to the Conservative Revolution:

Today it is not a matter of ‘conserving’ the present or returning to a recent past that has failed, but rather of regaining possession of our most archaic roots, which is to say those most suited to the victorious life.

We should avoid being backward-looking, concerned with restoration and reaction, for it is the last few centuries that have spawned the pox that is now devouring us.

It is a matter of returning to archaic and ancestral values, while at the same time envisioning the future as something more than the extension of the present.

Toward the end of his life, Faye reverted to Catholicism

== Influence ==
In the 1980s, his work was translated into English, Italian, German, or Spanish, and Faye spoke at numerous conferences organized by European New Right groups. Although he had initially abandoned all political activities in the late 1980s, his first books and articles continued to be discussed among American activists of the nascent movement that was later called the "Alt Right". Following his comeback to political writings, Faye renewed his links with GRECE and nationalist-revolutionary militants between 1998 and 2006. He became an important figure of "national-westernism", finding himself alongside European far-right militants the likes of Gabriele Adinolfi, Pierre Krebs, Ernesto Milá, Pierre Vial or Galina Lozko to defend the "future of the white world", as one conference organized in Moscow in June 2006 was entitled.

After 2006, Faye took part in conventions organized by the American Renaissance association led by Jared Taylor, and his ideas have been discussed by the American Alt Right website Counter-Currents. His works from the second intellectual period have been translated into English by Arktos Media, described as the "uncontested global leader in the publication of English-language Nouvelle Droite literature." The writings of Faye and Alain de Benoist, especially their metapolitical stance, have also influenced American far-right activist Richard B. Spencer, Swedish Identitarian Daniel Friberg, and the Identitarian movement at large. As for de Benoist, Faye's writings were discussed in the American New Left journal Telos, founded by philosopher Paul Piccone. According to Stéphane François, Faye "is responsible for the doctrinal renewal of French nativism and, more widely, for the development of the European-American radical Right". The translation of his books Archeofuturism and Why We Fight in English by Arktos in 2010 and 2011 made Faye into a "celebrity-intellectual" within the global New Right network.

== Works ==
- Le Système à tuer les peuples, Copernic 1981.
- Contre l'économisme, Le Labyrinthe, 1983.
- Sexe et Idéologie, Le Labyrinthe, 1983.
- La Nouvelle société de consommation, Le Labyrinthe, 1984.
- L'Occident comme déclin, Le Labyrinthe, 1984.
- Avant-guerre, Carrère, 1985.
- Nouveaux discours à la Nation Européenne, Albatros, 1985.
- Europe et modernité, Eurograf, 1985.
- Petit lexique du partisan européen (collaborator), Eurograf, 1985.
- Les Nouveaux enjeux idéologiques, Le Labyrinthe, 1985.
- La Soft-idéologie (collaborator as Pierre Barbès), Robert Laffont, 1987.
- Le Guide de l'engueulade, Presses de la Cité, 1992.
- Viol, pillage, esclavagisme, Christophe Colomb, cet incompris : essai historico-hystérique, Grancher, 1992.
- Le Manuel du séducteur pressé, Presses de la Cité, 1993.
- L'Archéofuturisme, L'Aencre, 1998. English translation: Archeofuturism, Arktos, 2010.
- La Colonisation de l’Europe: discours vrai sur l’immigration et l’Islam, L’Æncre, 2000. English translation: The Colonisation of Europe, Arktos, 2016.
- Les Extra-terrestres de A à Z, Dualpha, 2000.
- Pourquoi nous combattons: manifeste de la résistance européenne, L’Æncre, 2001. English translation: Why We Fight: Manifesto of the European Resistance, Arktos, 2011.
- Chirac contre les fachos, GFA, 2002.
- Avant-guerre, L’Aencre, 2002.
- Le coup dEtat mondial: Essai sur le Nouvel Impérialisme Américain., L’Æncre, 2004. English translation: A Global Coup, Arktos, 2017.
- La congergence des catastrophes., L’Æncre, 2004. English translation: Convergence of Catastrophes, Arktos, 2012.
- La Nouvelle Question juive, Le Lorre, 2007.
- Sexe et Dévoiement, Les éditions du Lore, 2011. English translation: Sex and Deviance, Arktos, 2014.
- L'Archéofuturisme V2.0 : nouvelles cataclysmiques, Le Lorre, 2012. English translation: Archaeofuturism 2.0, Arktos, 2016.
- Mon programme: Un programme révolutionnaire ne vise pas à changer les règles du jeu mais à changer de jeu , Les Éditions du Lore, 2012.
- Comprendre l'islam, Tatamis, 2015. English translation: Understanding Islam, Arktos, 2016.
- Guerre civile raciale, Éditions Conversano, 2019. English translation: Ethnic Apocalypse: The Coming European Civil War, Arktos, 2019 (foreword by Jared Taylor)
- Nederland, posthumous novel, Éditions Conversano, 2020.
- Giorgio Locchi, Guillaume Faye, Sur Heidegger et le mythe surhumaniste, Paris, La Nouvelle Librairie, coll. Agora de l'Institut Iliade, 295 p., 2025 ISBN 978-2-3860-8046-3
- Contre la Russophobie : La Russie post-soviétique, le fédéralisme euro-sibérien et la crise ukrainienne, pref. Robert Steuckers, introd. Stefano Vaj, Nantes, Éditions Ars Magna, coll. Heartland, 2025.

== See also ==
- Alain de Benoist
- Nouvelle Droite#Metapolitics and strategy
- Ethnopluralism
- Cultural racism
