= Giorgio Locchi =

Italian journalist (1923–1992)

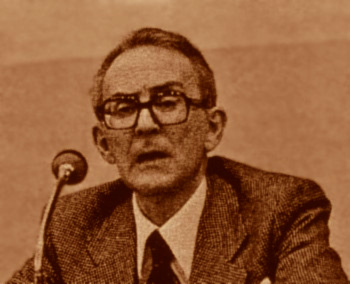
- Giorgio Locchi in 1977
- Born: 15 April 1923; Rome, Italy
- Died: 25 October 1992 (aged 69); Paris, France
- Education: Sapienza University of Rome
- Occupations: Journalist and writer
- Writing career
- Pen name: Hans-Jürgen Nigra
- Period: 1956–1992
- Notable works: Il male americano Nietzsche, Wagner e il mito sovrumanista

Giorgio Locchi (15 April 1923 – 25 October 1992) was an Italian journalist and writer. He was among the founders of GRECE.

== Life ==
Also known by the pseudonym Hans-Jürgen Nigra, he was for a long time the Paris correspondent for the Italian newspaper Il Tempo. After graduating in law from the University of Rome, he moved to Paris in the mid-fifties. Here he came into contact with Alain de Benoist, with whom he created the ethnonationalist think-tank GRECE, also known as New Right. By this time he began to write for magazines like Éléments and Nouvelle École. He also collaborated with several magazines and newspapers including La Destra, L'Uomo Libero and Secolo d'Italia.

One of the leading exponents of New Right, he broke away from it because he was averse to democracy and a supporter of Conservative Revolutionary movement values.

He was the author of several books translated into French, German and Spanish. His works revolved around Roman Empire, anti-Americanism and Nietzsche's anti-Christian thought.

Among the best known of Locchi's workes is the Nietzsche, Wagner e il mito sovrumanista, which was counted among the classics of hermeneutic on Richard Wagner.

His works influenced authors such as Guillaume Faye, Pierre Vial, Pierre Krebs, Robert Steuckers and Stefano Vaj.

== Works ==
=== In English ===
- Definitions: The Texts that Revolutionized Nonconformist Culture (London: Arktos, 2024)
- (with Alain de Benoist), The American Malady (Il male americano, Roma, LEDE, 1979), english trad. Alexander Jacob, Imperium Press, 195 p., 2025 ISBN 978-1923478213

=== In other languages ===
==== In Czech ====
- Podstata fašismu (Praha: Délský potápěč, 2011).

==== In French ====
- "Adriano Romualdi, l'essence du fascisme et la conception sphérique du temps de l'histoire," in Philippe Baillet, Le parti de la vie: clercs et guerriers d'Europe et d'Asia (Saint-Genis-Laval: Éditions Akribeia, 2015).
- Définitions: Le textes qui ont révolutionné la culture non conforme (Paris: La Nouvelle Librairie, 2022).
- Wagner, Nietzsche et le mythe surhumaniste (Paris: La Nouvelle Librairie, 2022).
- With Guillaume Faye, Sur Heidegger et le mythe surhumaniste (Paris: La Nouvelle Librairie, 2025).

==== In German ====
- With Robert de Herte (Alain de Benoist), Die USA, Europas missratenes Kind (München-Berlin: Herbig, 1979).
- "Über den Sinn der Geschichte," in Pierre Krebs (ed.), Das unvergängliche Erbe, Kassel, Thule-Seminar, (1981).

==== In Italian ====
- With Alain de Benoist, Il male americano (Roma: L.E.D.E., 1979).
- L'essenza del fascismo, with an essay and interview by Marco Tarchi (Castelnuovo Magra: Edizioni del Tridente, 1981).
- Nietzsche, Wagner e il mito sovrumanista, preface by Paolo Isotta, (Napoli: Akropolis, 1982).
- Definizioni (Milano: Barbarossa, 2006).
- Prospettive indoeuropee (Roma: Settimo Sigillo, 2010).

==== In Spanish ====
- With Robert Steuckers, Konservative Revolution: Introducción al nacionalismo radical aleman, 1918–1932 (Valencia: Ediciones Acebo Dorado, 1990).
- Definiciones: los textos que revolucionaron la cultura inconformista Europea (Molins de Rei: Barcelona Nueva República D.L., 2010).
- With Alain de Benoist, El enemigo americano: érase una vez América (Torredembarra: Tarragona Fides D.L., 2016).
- Figuras de la revolución conservadora (Torredembarra: Tarragona Fides D.L., 2016).

== Sources ==
- (in Italian) Marco Fraquelli, A destra di Porto Alegre : Perché la Destra è più noglobal della Sinistra, preface by Giorgio Galli, Catanzaro, Rubbettino, 2005, p. 94.
- Daniel S. Forrest, Suprahumanism : European man and the regeneration of history, London, Arktos Media, 2014.
- (in Italian) Francesco Germinario, Tradizione Mito Storia : La cultura politica della destra radicale e i suoi teorici, Roma, Carocci, 2014.
