= Maurice Rollet =

French journalist, poet and activist

- Born: 30 January 1933; Joigny, France
- Died: 21 January 2014 (aged 80)
- Occupations: Poet, activist and medical doctor

Maurice Rollet (30 January 1933 – 21 January 2014) was a French poet, activist and medical doctor. He sometimes used the pseudonym François Le Cap.

== Biography ==
In the 1960s, he was involved as a far right-wing activist with Jeune Nation, Europe-Action, and supported the OAS, for which he was imprisoned. In 1968 he was one of the co-founders of the Nouvelle Droite think tank GRECE and became its first president. According to Rollet, the organization was founded at his birthday party in Marseille on 29 January 1968, although this account has been contested.

In 1973 he co-founded the neopagan scouting organization Europe-Jeunesse alongside Jean-Claude Valla and Jean Mabire. Unlike some Nouvelle Droite activists who only adopted paganism as an intellectual position, Rollet saw it as a true way of life. He described what he called his "native faith" (French: foi native) as an individual approach based on rootedness, harmony with the cosmos, the constant search for physical and moral aesthetics, tolerance, and respect for the "Other". Rollet held contact with the World Congress of Ethnic Religions based in Vilnius.

His poetic works are marked by neopaganism. Some of his lyrics have been set to music by the singer Docteur Merlin, and are featured on the album Soleil de Pierre. Rollet acted in the movies The Rebel (1980) and La Flambeuse (1981).

He died on 21 January 2014.

== Bibliography ==
- Des Rimes et des Runes (in collaboration with Perig Kerys), Pyrene, 1980
- Le Mai 68 de la Nouvelle Droite (anthology), Labyrinthe, 1998
- Michel Marmin (ed.), Liber Amicorum Alain de Benoist, Les Amis d'Alain de Benoist, 2004
- Rencontre avec Robert Dun (anthology), Les Amis de la Culture Européenne, 2006
- Balades au cœur de l'Europe païenne (anthology), Les Éditions de la forêt, 2002.
