= Jean Varenne =

French Indologist (1926–1997)

- Born: 12 June 1926; Marseille, France
- Died: 12 July 1997 (aged 71); Paris, France
- Occupation: Indologist

Jean Varenne (12 June 1926 – 12 July 1997) was a French Indologist and a prominent figure of the Nouvelle Droite. He taught Sanskrit at the Aix-Marseille University, then at Jean Moulin University Lyon 3, where he was eventually nominated professor emeritus. Varenne has also been a visiting professor at the University of Chicago, and at other universities in India, Cambodia and Mexico.

== Biography ==
=== Early life and education ===
Jean Varenne was born on 12 June 1926 in Marseille, Provence. He attended Lycée Thiers, then Aix-Marseille University and the University of Paris, earning a PhD in Sanskrit studies at the École des Hautes Études. Varenne was a member of the French School of the Far East, and taught in India and Cambodia.

In 1962, he received a teaching position at Aix-Marseille, where he founded the Department of Indian Studies in the early 1960s. Varenne also worked as a visiting professor at El Colegio de México and at the University of Chicago in the second part of the 1960s.

=== Indology and political activism ===
In 1974, Varenne joined the patronage committee of Nouvelle École, a review published by GRECE, an ethno-nationalist think tank led by Alain de Benoist. He quit his teaching position at Aix-Marseille in 1980, and co-founded with Jean Haudry and Jean-Paul Allard the "Institute of Indo-European Studies" (IEIE) at the Jean Moulin University Lyon 3 the same year. He was appointed professor of Sanskrit philology, Indian civilization and history of religions at Lyon 3 in 1981. Varenne was also involved with the neo-fascist magazine Défense de l'Occident, led by Maurice Bardèche.

During the 1980s, Varenne directed the series "Le Monde Indien" in the prestigious publishing house Les Belles Lettres, and he founded the Belles Lettres collection "Études Indo-Européennes" in 1987. He served as the president of GRECE from 1984 to 1987, and was also a member of the Institute of Formation of the Front National (FN) of Jean-Marie Le Pen. In 1990, he was nominated to the "Scientific Council" of the FN.

=== Later life and death ===
At the end of his life, Varenne was working on an Encyclopedic Dictionary of Religions; only articles on Hinduism were published at the time of his death on 12 July 1997.

== Works ==
- Mahâ-Nârâyana Upanisad, 2 vol., Paris, Éditions de Boccard (PICI), 1960.
- Mantra védiques dans le « Raurava-âgama », JA 250/2, pp 185–1987, 1962.
- Zarathushtra et la tradition mazdéenne, Paris, Seuil, 1962 [reed. 1977].
- Le Véda, ed. Planète, 1967, [reed. Les Deux Océans, 2003].
- Mythes et légendes, extraits des Brâhmanas, Paris, Gallimard, 1968.
- Grammaire du sanskrit, Paris, Presses Universitaires de France, 1971.
- Upanisads du Yoga, traduits du sanskrit et annotés, Paris, Gallimard, 1971.
- Le Yoga et la tradition hindoue, Paris, Denoël, 1971.
- Célébration de la Grande Déesse (Dévî-mâhâtmya), Paris, Les Belles Lettres, 1975.
- Sept Upanishads, Paris, Seuil, 227 p., 1981, ISBN 9782020058728.
- Cosmogonies Védiques, Milan, Archè Milano, 1981 [reed. Les Belles Lettres, 1982].
- (Dir. with Jean Herbert) Vocabulaire de l'hindouisme, Dervy, 1985.
- Aux Sources du Yoga, J. Renard, 1989.
- La Gîta- Govinda, Le Rocher, 1991.
- L'Enseignement secret de la divine Shakti, Grasset, 1995.
- Le Tantrisme : mythes, rites, métaphysique, Albin Michel, 1997.
- Zoroastre, le prophète de l'Iran, Dervy, 1996.
- (Dir. with Michel Delahoutre) Dictionnaire de l'hindouisme, Le Rocher, 2002.
