= Mouvement Normand =

Mouvement normand
- Leader: President
- President: Didier Patte
- Founder (s): Pierre Godefroy; Jean Mabire; Didier Patte
- Founded: 1969 September 29 in Lisieux
- Headquarters: Écaquelon
- Ideology: Regionalism

Website
- Official site

The Mouvement normand (Norman Movement) is a regionalist political organisation from Normandy, in Northern France.

Unlike many regionalist groupings, they are open to the view that people of Normandy are one of the constituent nationalities that made up the French nation. They also see the people of Normandy as direct inheritors of authentic Normans and also the results of their overseas exploits, including the Norman conquest of England.

== History ==
The Mouvement normand has its origins in the far-right French movement of the 1960s. In 1969, Rouen branch of the right-wing students' union Fédération nationale des étudiants de France merged with l'Union pour la Région Normande in Lisieux to form Mouvement de la Jeunesse de Normandie, renamed Mouvement normand in 1971. It is led by prominent right-wing activist Didier Patte, who is also a member of Groupement de recherche et d'études sur la culture européenne (GRECE, the Research and Study Group on European Culture).

The Mouvement normand had always recruited its supporters from the French far-right, especially Front National. However, in recent years, there is a significant attraction for the members of centre-right parties such as Union for French Democracy (UDF).

== Major goals ==
- The unification of Haute-Normandie and Basse-Normandie into a single région of "Normandie". The merging of the two regions was decided by the French Parliament in 2014 and became effective on January 1, 2016
- More authority for the regional government of Normandy
- The recognition and preservation of the "unique" cultural character of Normandy, formed with elements from the Scandinavian culture as well as Gallic culture

== See also ==
- French nationalism
- Regionalism (politics)
