= Mémoire vive =

2012 book of interviews with Alain de Benoist

- Author: François Bousquet
- Language: French
- Subject: Alain de Benoist
- Genre: interview; memoir
- Publisher: Éditions de Fallois
- Publication date: 2 May 2012
- Publication place: France
- Pages: 330
- ISBN: 9782877067935

Mémoire vive (lit. 'Living Memory') is a 2012 collection of interviews by François Bousquet with the French writer and far-right activist Alain de Benoist. It functions as a memoir and lays out Benoist's experiences and changing political orientations, beginning in the early 1960s in the racialist far-right around Dominique Venner, via the Nouvelle Droite of the 1970s, and into a type of right-wing philosophy that takes significant influence from left-wing authors while maintaining a positive view of inequality.

Stéphane François described the book as an "intellectual biography" that is "very well written, which makes it a pleasant read", and "allows readers to understand Benoist's chaotic life".
