= Alain de Benoist =

French journalist and political theorist (born 1943)

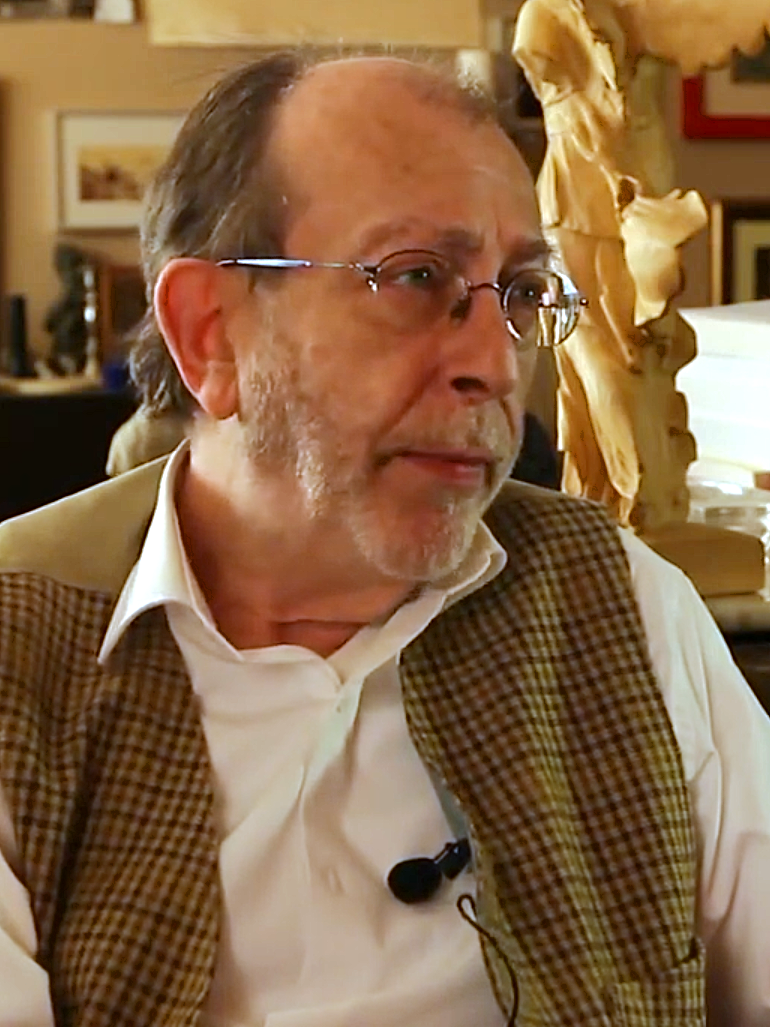
- Alain de Benoist in 2012
- Born: 11 December 1943 (age 82); Tours, Indre-et-Loire, France

Education
- Education: University of Paris

Philosophical work
- Era: Contemporary philosophy
- Region: Western philosophy: French philosophy; Continental philosophy
- School: Nouvelle Droite
- Notable ideas: Modernization and secularization of Christian values, repaganization of the West, pensée unique, Nouvelle Droite, ethnopluralism, metapolitics

Alain de Benoist (Note: also known as Fabrice Laroche, Robert de Herte, David Barney, and other pen names,) (/də bəˈnwɑː/; French: [alɛ̃ də bənwa]; born 11 December 1943) is a French political philosopher and journalist, a founding member of the Nouvelle Droite (France's New Right), and the leader of the ethno-nationalist think tank GRECE.

Principally influenced by thinkers of the German Conservative Revolution, de Benoist is opposed to Christianity, the Declaration of the Rights of Man and of the Citizen, neoliberalism, representative democracy, egalitarianism, and what he sees as embodying and promoting those values, mainly the United States. He theorized the notion of ethnopluralism, a concept which relies on preserving and mutually respecting individual and bordered ethno-cultural regions.

His work has been influential with the alt-right movement in the United States, and he presented a lecture on identity at a National Policy Institute conference hosted by Richard B. Spencer; however, he has distanced himself from the movement.

== Biography ==
=== Family ===
Coat of arms of the House de Benoist

Alain de Benoist was born on 11 December 1943 in Saint-Symphorien (now part of Tours), Centre-Val de Loire, the son of a head of sales at Guerlain, also named Alain de Benoist, and Germaine de Benoist, née Langouët. He grew up in a bourgeois and Catholic family. His mother came from the lower-middle class of Normandy and Brittany, and his father belonged to the Belgian nobility.

During the Second World War, his father was a member of the French resistance armed group French Forces of the Interior. He was a self-declared Gaullist, whereas his wife Germaine was rather left-leaning, and the extended de Benoist family was divided between Free France and Vichy France during the conflict. His paternal grandmother, Yvonnes de Benoist, was the secretary of Gustave Le Bon. De Benoist is also the great-nephew of French Symbolist painter Gustave Moreau.

=== Early life (1957–1961) ===
De Benoist was still in high school at Montaigne and Louis-le-Grand lycées during the turmoils of the Algerian War (1954–1962), a period that shaped his political views. In 1957, he met the daughter of the antisemitic journalist and conspiracy theorist Henry Coston. From the age of 15, de Benoist became interested in the nationalist right; he started a career as a journalist in 1960 by writing literary pieces and pamphlets for Coston's magazine Lectures Françaises, generally in defence of the French colonial empire and the pro-colonial paramilitary organization Organisation Armée Secrète (OAS). De Benoist stayed away from Coston's conspiracy theories on the Freemasonry and the Jews.

Aged 17 in 1961, de Benoist met François d'Orcival, with whom he became the editor of France Information, an underground pro-OAS newspaper. The same year, he started to attend the University of Paris and joined the far-right student society Federation of Nationalist Students (FEN). In 1962, he became the secretary of the group's magazine, Cahiers universitaires, in which he wrote the main articles along with d'Orcival. As a student in law and literature, he began a period of political activism and developed a passion for fantastique cinema. According to philosopher Pierre-André Taguieff, de Benoist possessed an intellectual curiosity that was lacking among his elder colleagues like Dominique Venner (1935–2013) or Jean Mabire (1927–2006), and the young journalist led them to discover a conceptual universe "that they could not imagine", no more than its "possible ideological exploitations".

=== Radical political activism (1962–1967) ===
De Benoist met Dominique Venner in 1962. The following year, he took part in the creation of Europe-Action, a white nationalist magazine founded by Venner and in which de Benoist began to work as a journalist. He published at that times his first essays: Salan devant l'opinion ("Salan faces the [public] opinion", 1963) and Le courage est leur patrie ("Braveness is their motherland", 1965), defending French Algeria and the OAS.

Between 1963 and 1965, de Benoist was a member of the Rationalist Union; he probably began to read Louis Rougier's criticism of Christianity during that period. De Benoist met Rougier, who was also a member of the organization, and his ideas deeply influenced de Benoist's own anti-Christianity. In 1965, de Benoist wrote: "We oppose Rougier to Sartre, as we oppose verbal delirium to logics ..., because biological realism is the best support against those idealistic chimeras". De Benoist became in 1964 the editor-in-chief of the weekly publication Europe-Action Hebdomaire, renamed L'Observateur Européen in October 1966. He also wrote in the neo-fascist magazine Défense de l'Occident, founded in 1952 by Maurice Bardèche.

After a visit to South Africa at the invitation of Hendrik Verwoerd's National Party government, de Benoist co-wrote with Gilles Fournier the 1965 essay Vérité pour l'Afrique du Sud ("Truth for South Africa"), in which they endorsed apartheid. The following year, he co-wrote with D'Orcival another essay, Rhodésie, pays des lions fidèles ("Rhodesia, country of the faithful lions"), in defence of Rhodesia, a breakaway country in southern Africa ruled at that time by a white-minority government. Ian Smith, the then prime minister of the unrecognized state, prefaced the book. Returning from a trip to the United States in 1965, de Benoist deplored the suppression of racial segregation in the United States, and wrote as a prediction that the system would survive outside the law, thus in a more violent way.

In two essays published in 1966, Les Indo-Européens ("The Indo-Europeans") and Qu'est-ce que le nationalisme? ("What Is Nationalism?"), de Benoist contributed to define a new form of European nationalism in which the European civilization – to be understood as the "white race" — would be considered above its constituting ethnic groups, all united within a common empire and civilization superseding the nation states. This agenda was adopted by the European Rally for Liberty (REL) during the 1967 French legislative election (de Benoist was a member of the REL national council), and later became a core idea of GRECE since its foundation in 1968.

The successive failures of the far-right movements de Benoist had supported since the early 1960s – from the dissolution of OAS and the Évian Accords of 1962, to the electoral defeat of presidential candidate Jean-Louis Tixier-Vignancour in 1965 (in which he had participated via the grassroots movement T.V. Committees), to the debacle of the REL in the March 1967 election – led de Benoist to question his political involvement. In the fall of 1967, he decided to make a "permanent and complete break with political action" and to focus on a meta-political strategy by launching a review. During the May 1968 events in France, then aged 25, de Benoist worked as a journalist for the professional magazine L'Écho de la presse et de la publicité.

=== Nouvelle Droite and media fame (1968–1993) ===
The Groupement de Recherche et d'Études pour la Civilisation Européenne (GRECE) was founded in January 1968 to serve as a metapolitical, ethnonationalist think-tank promoting the ideas of the Nouvelle Droite. Although the organization was established with former militants of the REL and FEN, de Benoist has been described by scholars as its leader and "most authoritative spokesman". In the 1970s, de Benoist adapted his geopolitical view-points and went from a pro-colonial attitude towards an advocacy of Third-Worldism against capitalist America and communist Russia, from the defence of the "last outposts of the West" towards anti-Americanism, and from a biological to a cultural approach of the notion of alterity, an idea which he developed in his ethnopluralist theories.

De Benoist's works, along with others published by the think tank, began to attract public attention in the late 1970s, when the media coined the term Nouvelle Droite to label the movement. He started to write articles for mainstream right-wing magazines, namely Valeurs actuelles and Le Spectacle du Monde from 1970 to 1982, and Le Figaro Dimanche (renamed in 1978 Le Figaro Magazine) from 1977 to 1982; he then wrote for the videos section of Le Figaro Magazine until 1992. De Benoist was awarded in 1978 the prestigious Prix de l'essai by the Académie française for his book View for the Right (Vu de droite: Anthologie critique des idées contemporaines). Between 1980 and 1992, he was a regular participant in the radio program Panorama on France Culture.

Although de Benoist had announced his retirement from political parties and elections to focus on metapolitics in 1968, he ran as a candidate for the far-right Party of New Forces during the 1979 European Parliament election. In the 1984 European Parliament election in France, de Benoist announced his intention to vote for the French Communist Party, and justified his choice by describing the party as the most credible anti-capitalist, anti-liberal, and anti-American political force then active in France.

De Benoist met Russian writer Aleksandr Dugin in 1989 and the two of them soon became close collaborators. De Benoist was invited in Moscow by Dugin in 1992, and Dugin presented himself as the Moscow correspondent of GRECE for a time. De Benoist briefly served as a board member of Dugin's magazine Elementy in 1992. The two authors eventually broke off their relationship in 1993 after a virulent campaign in French and German media against the "red and brown threat" in Russia. Whereas de Benoist acknowledged ideological differences with Dugin, especially on Eurasianism and Martin Heidegger, they have maintained regular exchanges since then.

=== Intellectual re-emergence (1994–present) ===
In 1979 and 1993, two press campaigns launched in French liberal media against de Benoist damaged his public reputation and influence in France by claiming that he was in reality a "closet Fascist" or a "Nazi". The journalists accused de Benoist of hiding his racist and anti-egalitarian beliefs in a seemingly acceptable public agenda, replacing the doomed hierarchy of races with the less suspicious concept of ethno-pluralism. Although he still frequently comments on politics, de Benoist chose in the early 1990s to focus on his intellectual activity and to avoid media attention. Since the 2000s onward, public interest for de Benoist's works have re-emerged. His writings have been published in several far-right journals, such as the Journal of Historical Review, Chronicles, the Occidental Quarterly, and Tyr, and the New Left academic journal Telos. De Benoist was one of the signatories of the 2002 Manifesto Against the Death of the Spirit and the Earth, reportedly because "it seemed to [him] that it reacts against the practical materialism that is part of a dominant ideology, an ideology for which there is nothing beyond material concerns".

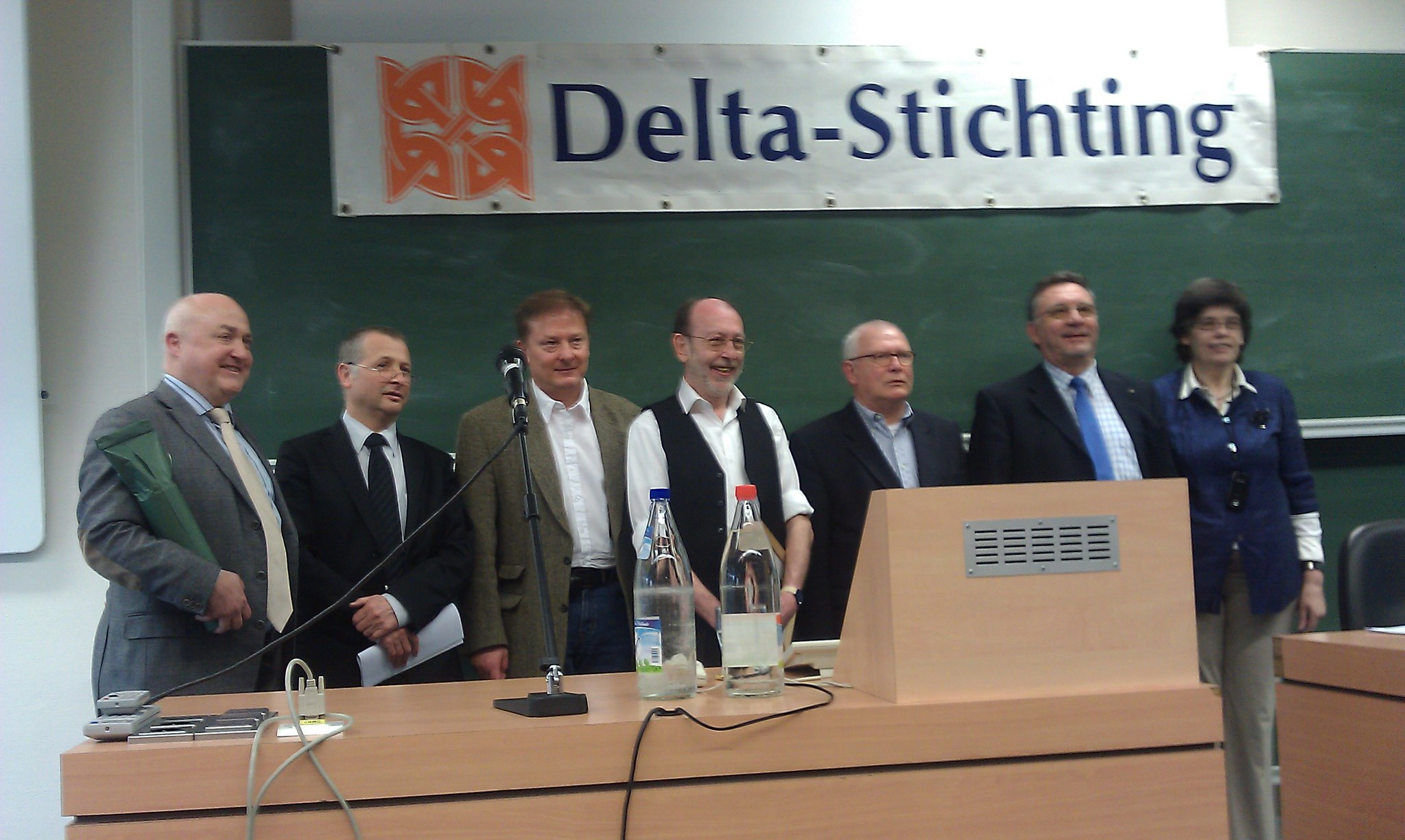
De Benoist (centre) at the Delta Foundation symposium of Antwerp in 2011

In a 2002 republication of his book View from the Right, de Benoist reiterated what he wrote in 1977 that the greatest danger in the world at that time was the "progressive disappearance of diversity from the world", including biodiversity of animals, cultures and peoples. De Benoist is now the editor of two magazines: the yearly Nouvelle École (since 1968) and the quarterly Krisis (since 1988).

Although the extent of the relationship is debated by scholars, de Benoist and the Nouvelle Droite are generally viewed as influential on the ideological and political structure of the Identitarian movement. Part of the alt-right has also claimed to have been inspired by de Benoist's writings.

== Political views ==
In his early writings, de Benoist was close to pro-colonial movements and followed an ethno-biological approach of social science, endorsing apartheid as the "last outpost of the West" at a time of "decolonization and international negrification". From the 1970s onward, he has gradually moved towards the defence of the Third World against American imperialism, and has adopted a cultural definition of difference, which is theorized in his concept of ethnopluralism. Scholars have questioned whether this evolution should be regarded as a sincere ideological detachment from the biological racism of his activist youth, or rather as a meta-political strategy set up to disguise non-egalitarian ideas behind more acceptable concepts. De Benoist is also an ardent critic of globalization, unrestricted mass immigration, liberalism, postmodern society, and what he calls the "ideology of sameness".

Political scientist Jean-Yves Camus describes the key idea of de Benoist in those terms: "[T]hrough the use of meta-politics, to think the ways and means that are necessary for European civilization, based on the cultural values shared on the continent until the advent of globalization, to thrive and be perpetuated." Although de Benoist embodies the core values of GRECE and the Nouvelle Droite, his works are not always identical to those of other thinkers of the movements. He is opposed in particular to political violence, and he has declared that he had been building "a school of thought, not a political movement." In 2000, he disavowed Guillaume Faye's "strongly racist" ideas regarding Muslims after the publication of The Colonization of Europe: Speaking Truth about Immigration and Islam.

=== Identity ===
In 2006, de Benoist defined identity as a dialogical phenomenon, inspired by Martin Buber's philosophy of dialogue and Ich und Du concept. According to him, one's identity is made of two components: the "objective part" coming from one's background (gender, ethnicity, religion, family, nationality), and the "subjective part" freely chosen by the individual. Identity is therefore a perpetual evolution rather than a definitive notion. In 1992, de Benoist dismissed the Front National's use of ethnopluralism on the grounds that it portrayed "difference as an absolute, whereas, by definition, it exists only relationally." (Note: Interview with Alain de Benoits for Le Monde, May 1992. In the end, the editors did not publish it. Full text at https://s3-eu-west-1.amazonaws.com/alaindebenoist/pdf/entretien_sur_la_politique_francaise.pdf. There he had answered: "Le droit à la différence est un principe et, comme tel, il ne vaut que par sa généralité. Autrement dit, je ne suis fondé à défendre ma différence que pour autant que je reconnais et respecte celle d'autrui. A partir du moment où vous instrumentalisez ce droit pour opposer votre différence à celle des autres, au lieu d'admettre que celle des autres ne menace pas la vôtre, mais au contraire la renforce, à partir du moment où vous considérez la différence, non comme ce qui permet le dialogue mais comme ce qui légitime son refus, lorsque par conséquent vous posez la différence comme un absolu alors qu'elle n'existe par définition que dans la relation, vous retombez dans le nationalisme tribal, dans l'appartenance comme subjectivité pure. On en voit les effets directs dans les inconséquences d'un Le Pen qui, en France, fait profession de défendre les traditions des « indigènes », mais justifie le colonialisme en Nouvelle-Calédonie et décrit la coutume kanak comme « rétrograde », ou bien encore parle de Dieu dans ses discours, mais soutient qu'on ne peut être à la fois bon Français et bon musulman!")

In 1966, he had written: "Race is the only real unit encompassing individual variations. The objective study of history shows that only the European race (white race, caucasian) has continued to progress since its appearance on the rising path of the evolution of the living, unlike races stagnant in their development, therefore in virtual regression."

If scholars like Pierre-André Taguieff have characterized the Nouvelle Droite as a form of mixophobia due to its focus on the notion of difference, de Benoist has also criticized what he calls "the pathology of identity", that is to say the political use of identity by the populist Right to push an "us versus them" debate escorted by what he considers to be "[systematic] and [irrational] hating". The difficulty of understanding de Benoist's views on identity rests upon the fact that his writings have experienced multiple reformulations since the 1960s. In 1974, he said "there is no superior race. All races are superior and each of them has its own genius." In 1966, he had written: "The European race does not have absolute superiority. It is only the most capable of progressing in the direction of evolution ... Racial factors being statistically hereditary, each race has its own psychology. All psychology generates value." De Benoist has been influenced by Carl Schmitt's distinction between friend and enemy as the core issue of politics. Despite this, he sees immigrants as eventually victims of globalization, and has argued that immigration was first of all a consequence of multinational companies being greedy for profits and preferring to import cheap labor.

=== Ethnopluralism ===
De Benoist rejects the nation state and nationalism on the grounds that both liberalism and nationalism eventually derive from the same metaphysics of subjectivity, and that what he describes as the centralized and Jacobin state established by the French Republic had destroyed regional identities in its project of a "one and indivisible" France. He stands instead for the political autonomy of each and every group, favouring an integral federalism built on the principle of subsidiarity, which in his views would transcend the nation state and give way for both regional and Europe identities to thrive. De Benoist believes that knowledge of ethnic and religious traditions is a duty that must be passed on to following generations, and he has been critical of the idea of a moral imperative to cosmopolitanism.

=== Liberalism ===
De Benoist is a critic of the primacy of individual rights, an ideology that he sees embodied in humanism, the French Revolution, and the ideas of the Founding Fathers of the United States. While not a communist, de Benoist has been influenced by the Marxist analysis of the nature of capitalism and conflicting class interests developed by Karl Marx in Das Kapital. As a result, another of his core ideas is that the world is facing the "hegemony of capital" and the "pursuit of self-interest", two typical trends of the postmodern era.

According to scholar Jean-Yves Camus, if de Benoist can share anti-capitalist analysis with leftists, the nature of his goal is indeed different since de Benoist considers the unlimited expansion of the free market and consumerism as key contributors to the erasure of peoples' identities. Furthermore, de Benoist acknowledges the existence of the working class and the bourgeoisie but does not make an essential distinction between the two of them. He rather divides society between the "new dominant class" and the "people". In 1991, the editorial staff of his magazine Eléments described the danger of adopting a "systematic anti-egalitarianism [that could] lead to social Darwinism, which might justify free-market economy".

De Benoist is opposed to the modern American liberal idea of a melting pot. A critic of the United States, he has been quoted as saying: "Some people do not accept the thought of one day having to wear the Red Army cap. In fact, it is a terrible prospect. However, this is not a reason to tolerate the idea of one day having to spend what we have left to live on by eating hamburgers in Brooklyn." In 1991, he described European supporters of the first Gulf War as "collaborators of the American order".

=== Monotheism ===
De Benoist has supported ties with Islamic culture in the 1980s, on the grounds that the relationship would be distinct from what he saw as the consumerism and materialism of the American society and from the bureaucracy and repression of the Soviet Union alike. He also opposes Christianity, viewing it as inherently intolerant, theocratic, and bent on persecution.

== Intellectual influences ==
De Benoist's influences include Antonio Gramsci, Ernst Jünger, Martin Buber, Jean Baudrillard, Georges Dumézil, Ernest Renan, José Ortega y Gasset, Vilfredo Pareto, Karl Marx, Guy Debord, Arnold Gehlen, Stéphane Lupasco, Helmut Schelsky, Konrad Lorenz, the Conservative Revolutionaries including Carl Schmitt and Oswald Spengler, the non-conformists of the 1930s, Johann Gottfried Herder, Johannes Althusius, interwar Austro-Marxists, and communitarian philosophers like Alasdair MacIntyre and Charles Taylor.

== Critics ==
Critics of de Benoist, such as Thomas Sheehan, argue he has developed a novel restatement of fascism. Roger Griffin, using an ideal type definition of fascism, which includes "populist ultra-nationalism" and "palingenesis" (heroic rebirth), argues that the Nouvelle Droite draws on such fascist ideologues as Armin Mohler in a way that allows Nouvelle Droite ideologues like de Benoist to claim a "metapolitical" stance but which nonetheless has residual fascist ideological elements. In response to accusations of fascism, de Benoist notes his support of direct democracy and localism, as well as his opposition to authoritarianism, totalitarianism, and militarism, characteristics of historical Fascism. De Benoist's critics also claim his views recall Nazi attempts to replace German Christianity with its own paganism. They note that de Benoist's rejection of the French Revolution's legacy and the allegedly abstract Rights of Man ties him to the same Counter-Enlightenment right-wing tradition as counter-revolutionary Legitimists, fascists, Vichyites, and integral nationalists.

== Personal life ==
Identifying as neo-pagan, de Benoist married Doris Christians, a German citizen, on 21 June 1972. They have two children. He is a member of Mensa International, a high-IQ society whose former president of the French branch was a member of the patronage committee of Nouvelle École. De Benoist owns the largest private library in France, with an estimate of 150,000 to 250,000 books.

== See also ==
- Guillaume Faye
- Jean-Claude Valla
- Mémoire vive

== Works ==
- Salan devant l'opinion (under the pen name of Fabrice Laroche) (Saint-Just, 1963).
- Le courage est leur patrie (under the pen name of Fabrice Laroche, with François d'Orcival) (Saint-Just, 1965).
- Vérité pour l'Afrique du Sud (under the pen name of Fabrice Laroche, with Gilles Fournier) (Saint-Just, 1965).
- Les Indo-Européens (G.E.D., 1966).
- Rhodésie, pays des lions fidèles (with François d'Orcival) (Table Ronde, 1966).
- Avec ou sans Dieu : l'avenir des valeurs chrétiennes (with Jean-Luc Marion) (Beauchesne, 1970).
- L'Empirisme logique et la Philosophie du Cercle de Vienne (Nouvelle École, 1970).
- Nietzsche: Morale et « Grande Politique » (GRECE, 1973).
- Konrad Lorenz et l'Éthologie moderne (Nouvelle École, 1975).
- Il était une fois l'Amérique (under the pseudonym of Robert de Herte, with [Giorgio Locchi]) under the pseudonym of Hans-Jürgen Nigra), Nouvelle École, 1976.
- Vu de droite. Anthologie critique des idées contemporaines (Copernic, 1977). (grand prix de l'essai de l'Académie française 1978)
- Les Bretons (Les Cahiers de la Bretagne réelle, n°396 bis, 1978).
- Les Idées à l'endroit (Libres-Hallier, 1978).
- (with Giorgio Locchi), Il male americano, LEDE, Roma, 1979; trad. The American Malady, english trad. Alexander Jacob, Imperium Press, 195 p., 2025 ISBN 978-1923478213
- Le Guide pratique des prénoms (under the pen name of Robert de Herte, with [sic] Alain de Benoist), coll. « Hors-série d'"Enfants-Magazine" » (Publications Groupe Média, 1979).
- Comment peut-on être païen ? (Albin Michel, 1981).
- Les Traditions d'Europe (Paris: Labyrinthe, 1982).
- Orientations pour des années décisives (Labyrinthe, 1982).
- Fêter Noël. Légendes et Traditions (Atlas-Edena, 1982).
- Démocratie : le problème (Labyrinthe, 1985)
- (in collaboration with Andre Béjin & Julien Freund) Racismes, Antiracismes (Paris: Librairie des Méridiens, 1986)
- (with Thomas Molnar) L'éclipse du sacré: discours et résponses (Paris: Table ronde, 1986)
- Europe, Tiers monde, même combat (Robert Laffont, 1986).
- Der Bildhauer Emil Hipp und sein Werk: Das Richard-Wagner-Denkmal für Leipzig, coll. « Kleine Bibliothek der deutschen Kunst », No. 1, Tübingen, Grabert Verlag, 1989.
- Kunst in Deutschland (1933–1945): eine wissenchaftliche Enzyklopädie der Kunst im Dritten Reich [« Art in Germany (1933–1945) : a scientific encyclopedia of Art under the Third Reich »], under the pseudonym of Mortimer Davidson, Tübingen, Grabert Verlag, 1991.
- Le Grain de sable. Jalons pour une fin de siècle (Labyrinthe, 1994).
- Nationalisme : Phénoménologie et Critique (GRECE, 1994).
- Démocratie représentative et Démocratie participative (GRECE, 1994).
- Nietzsche et la Révolution conservatrice (GRECE, 1994).
- L'Empire intérieur (Fata Morgana, 1995).
- La Ligne de mire. Discours aux citoyens européens, t. 1 : 1972–1987 (Labyrinthe, 1995).
- Famille et Société. Origine, Histoire, Actualité (Labyrinthe, 1996).
- La Ligne de mire. Discours aux citoyens européens, t. 2 : 1988–1995 (Labyrinthe, 1996).
- Céline et l'Allemagne, 1933–1945. Une mise au point (Le Bulletin célinien, 1996); new revised and expanded edition, Société des Lecteurs de Céline, 160 p., 2025 ISBN 978-2959875908
- Horizon 2000. Trois entretiens avec Alain de Benoist (GRECE, 1996).
- La Légende de Clovis (Cercle Ernest Renan, 1996).
- Indo-Européens : à la recherche du foyer d'origine (Nouvelle École, 1997).
- Ernst Jünger. Une bio-bibliographie (Guy Trédaniel, 1997).
- Communisme et Nazisme. 25 réflexions sur le totalitarisme au XXe siècle (Labyrinthe, 1998).
- L'Écume et les Galets. 1991–1999 : dix ans d'actualité vue d'ailleurs (Labyrinthe, 2000).
- Jésus sous l'œil critique des historiens (Cercle Ernest Renan, 2000).
- Bibliographie d'Henri Béraud (Association rétaise des Amis d'Henri Béraud, 2000).
- Dernière Année. Notes pour conclure le siècle (L'Âge d'Homme, 2001).
- Jésus et ses Frères (Cercle Ernest Renan, 2001).
- Louis Rougier. Sa vie, son œuvre (Cercle Ernest Renan, 2002).
- Charles Maurras et l'Action française. Une bibliographie, BCM, 2002
- Qu'est-ce qu'un militant ? (sous le pseudonyme de Fabrice Laroche, réédition d'un article paru en 1963) (Ars Magna, 2003).
- Critiques-Théoriques (L'Âge d'Homme, 2003).
- Au-delà des droits de l'homme. Pour défendre les libertés (éditions Krisis, 2004).
- Bibliographie générale des droites françaises. 1, Arthur de Gobineau, Gustave Le Bon, Édouard Drumont, Maurice Barrès, Pierre Drieu La Rochelle, Henry de Montherlant, Thierry Maulnier, Julien Freund (Éditions Dualpha, coll. « Patrimoine des lettres », Coulommiers, 2004), 609 p.
- Bibliographie générale des droites françaises. 2, Georges Sorel, Charles Maurras, Georges Valois, Abel Bonnard, Henri Béraud, Louis Rougier, Lucien Rebatet, Robert Brasillach (Éditions Dualpha, coll. « Patrimoine des lettres », Coulommiers, 2004), 472 p.
- Bibliographie générale des droites françaises. 3, Louis de Bonald, Alexis de Tocqueville, Georges Vacher de Lapouge, Léon Daudet, Jacques Bainville, René Benjamin, Henri Massis, Georges Bernanos, Maurice Bardèche, Jean Cau (Éditions Dualpha, coll. « Patrimoine des lettres », Coulommiers, 2005), 648 p.
- Bibliographie générale des droites françaises. 4, Joseph de Maistre, Ernest Renan, Jules Soury, Charles Péguy, Alphonse de Chateaubriant, Jacques Benoist-Méchin, Gustave Thibon, Saint-Loup (Marc Augier), Louis Pauwels (Éditions Dualpha, coll. « Patrimoine des lettres », Coulommiers, 2005), 736 p.
- Bibliographie générale des droites françaises. 5, Édouard Berth, Louis-Ferdinand Céline, Dominique de Roux, Raymond Abellio, Jules Monnerot, Paul Sérant, Jean Mabire, Jean Madiran, Dominique Venner, Jean Raspail. Éditions Dualpha, coll. « Patrimoine des lettres », Coulommiers, 2022, 648 p. ISBN 9782353745685
- Jésus et ses Frères, et autres écrits sur le christianisme, le paganisme et la religion (éditions Les Amis d'Alain de Benoist, 2006).
- C'est-à-dire. Entretiens-Témoignages-Explications (2 volumes) (éditions Les Amis d'Alain de Benoist, 2006).
- Nous et les autres. Problématique de l'identité (éditions Krisis, 2006).
- Carl Schmitt actuel (éditions Krisis, 2007).
- Demain, la décroissance ! Penser l'écologie jusqu'au bout (Edite, 2007).
- Dictionnaire des prénoms : d'hier et d'aujourd'hui, d'ici et d'ailleurs (Jean Picollec, 2009).
- Mémoire vive / Entretiens avec François Bousquet (Éditions de Fallois, Collection « Littérature », 2 mai 2012).
- Edouard Berth ou le socialisme héroïque. Sorel, Maurras, Lenine (Pardès, 2013).
- Les Démons du Bien, Du nouvel ordre moral à l'idéologie du genre (Pierre-Guillaume de Roux, 2013).
- Quatre figures de la Révolution Conservatrice allemande : Werner Sombart - Arthur Moeller van den Bruck - Ernst Niekisch – Oswald Spengler (Éditions Les Amis d'Alain de Benoist, 2014).
- Le traité transatlantique et autres menaces (Pierre-Guillaume de Roux, 2015).
- Bibliographie internationale de l'œuvre de Céline (Éditions Pierre-Guillaume de Roux, 2015).
- Au-delà des droits de l'Homme. Pour défendre les libertés (Pierre-Guillaume de Roux, 2016).
- Droite-gauche, c'est fini ! : Le moment populiste (Pierre-Guillaume de Roux, 2017).
- Ce que penser veut dire. Penser avec Goethe, Heidegger, Rousseau, Schmitt, Péguy, Arendt… (Éditions du Rocher, 2017).
- L'Écriture runique et les origines de l'écriture, 224 p., Éditions Yoran Embanner, Coll. H, 2017.
- Contre le libéralisme (Le Rocher, 2019).
- La Chape de plomb : une déconstruction des nouvelles censures, Paris, La Nouvelle Librairie, 240 p., 2020 ISBN 978-2-4914-4621-5
- La Bibliothèque du jeune Européen : 200 essais pour apprendre à penser, under the direction of Alain de Benoist & Guillaume Travers, Éditions du Rocher, 672 p., 2020 ISBN 978-2-2681-0441-6
- Ernst Jünger : entre les dieux et les titans (Via Romana, 2020).
- La Puissance et la Foi : essais de théologie politique (Pierre-Guillaume de Roux, 2021).
- L'homme qui n'avait pas de père : le dossier Jésus, Paris, Éditions Krisis, 962 p., 2021 ISBN 978-2-91691-615-6
- With Nicolas Gauthier, Survivre à la désinformation, Paris, La Nouvelle Librairie, preface by Gabrielle Cluzel, 500 p., 2021 ISBN 978-2-491446-52-9
- La Bibliothèque littéraire du jeune Européen : 400 œuvres de fiction essentielles, under the direction of Alain de Benoist & Guillaume Travers, Éditions du Rocher, 728 p., 2021 ISBN 978-2268106335
- Contre l'esprit du temps : explications, Paris, La Nouvelle Librairie, coll. Dans l'Arène, 722 p., 2022 ISBN 978-2-491446-72-7
- Qu'est-ce que l'idéologie du Même ?, suivi de Irremplaçables communautés, Paris, La Nouvelle Librairie, coll. « Longue Mémoire », 69 p., 2022 ISBN 978-2491446871
- With Gustave Thibon, Un débat sur la tradition, Marseille, Belle-de-Mai, 2022, 92 p.
- L'Exil intérieur : Carnets intimes, Paris, Éditions Krisis, 356 p., 2022 ISBN 978-2493898296
- (Dir. Alain de Benoist), La Nouvelle Droite au XXIe siècle : Orientations face aux années décisives, Paris, La Nouvelle Librairie, coll. « Dans l'arène », 96 p., 2023 ISBN 978-2493898777
- Germanica : Yggdrasill, l’Arbre cosmique des ancien Germains, Verden : Widukind face à Charlemagne, Götz von Berlichingen et la Guerre des Paysans, Paris, Éditions Dualpha, coll. « Patrimoine des héritages », 174 p., 2023 ISBN 978-2353746248
- Martin Buber : théoricien de la réciprocité, préf. Guillaume de Tanoüarn, Versailles, Via Romana, 200 p., 2023 ISBN 978-2372712422
- Un autre Rousseau : Lumières et contre-Lumières, préf. Michel Onfray, Paris, Fayard, 304 p., 2025 ISBN 978-2213731780
- Souveraineté nationale et souveraineté populaire, Paris, Krisis, 232 p., 2026 ISBN 978-2386080579
- Indo-Européens : À la recherche du foyer d'origine, introd. Henri Levavasseur, annex by Gabriel Piniés, Paris, Krisis, 282 p., 2026 ISBN 978-2386080647
