= Thule-Seminar =

German far-right ethnonationalist organization

Thule–Seminar
- Forschungs- und Lehrgemeinschaft für die indoeuropäische Kultur e. V.
- Combined Tyr rune and Sig rune of the Thule-Seminar
- Formation: July 1980; 45 years ago
- Founder: Pierre Krebs; Wigbert Grabert; Marielouise Grabert; Hans-Günther Grimm; Hans-Michael Fiedler
- Purpose: European nationalism; Ethnopluralism; Neopaganism; Anti-Americanism; Antisemitism
- Headquarters: Kassel

The Thule-Seminar is a far-right nationalist organization with strong Neopaganist roots based in Kassel, Germany. It was founded in 1980 by Pierre Krebs, essentially as the German branch of GRECE. Sometimes described as a think tank or "party of the mind", its name alludes to the Thule Society (itself named after the mythical Northern island of Thule), one of the organizations that facilitated the rise of the Nazis and provided some of the intellectual cadre for the latter.

It describes itself as a "research society for Indo-European culture". On its homepage, it deplores the formation of a "multiracial, i.e. monoprimitive" society in the "ethnosuicidal" cultures of Europe and declares its aim to be the formation of "metapolitical" ("metapo") cells across Europe. As emblems, it uses the Black Sun, as well as the combined Tiwaz rune and Sig rune.

Its ideology has been described as based on the Conservative revolution and including elements of anti-Americanism, anti-Zionism and being close to apartheid.

The first major publication of the Seminar was Das unvergängliche Erbe. Alternativen zum Prinzip der Gleichheit (translation: "The Everlasting Heritage: Alternatives to the Principle of Equality"), edited by Krebs and published in 1981 by Grabert Verlag; notably, the preface of this volume was written by Hans Jürgen Eysenck. It turned out to be the "programmatic" book of the Seminar. The Thule-Seminar publishes a journal called Elemente and another one called Metapo.

== See also ==
- Nouvelle Droite
