= Ethnopluralism =

Political model attempting to preserve separate and bordered ethno-cultural regions

Ethnopluralism or ethno-pluralism, also known as ethno-differentialism, is a political model which attempts to preserve separate and bordered ethno-cultural regions. According to its promoters, significant foreign cultural elements in a given region ought to be culturally assimilated to seek cultural homogenization in this territory, in order to let different cultures thrive in their respective geographical areas. Advocates also emphasize a "right to difference" (French: droit à la difference) and claim support for cultural diversity at a worldwide rather than at a national level.

Proponents describe ethnopluralism as an alternative to multiculturalism and globalization. They claim that it strives to keep the world's different cultures alive by embracing their uniqueness and avoiding a one-world doctrine in which different regions can be increasingly seen as culturally similar or identical. Critics have called the project a form of "global apartheid" and "separate but equal" doctrine, and many specialists have described the idea as a strategic attempt to legitimise racial supremacist views in public opinion by imitating egalitarian, anti-totalitarian, antiracist, or environmental discourses of the progressive movement. Scholars have also highlighted close ideological similarities with ideas promoted by French neo-fascist activists in the 1950–1960s.

The concept, formulated in its modern form by French political theorist and Nouvelle Droite founding member Alain de Benoist, is closely associated with the European New Right and the Identitarian movement.

== Origin ==
According to ethnographer Benjamin R. Teitelbaum, the term "ethnopluralism" (German: Ethnopluralismus) was coined by German sociologist Henning Eichberg in a 1973 essay that was written in opposition to both Western and European eurocentrism.

The concept of ethno-differentialism (French: ethno-différencialisme) was promoted from the 1970s onward by GRECE, an ethno-nationalist think tank led by Nouvelle Droite thinker Alain de Benoist, but it was foreshadowed by ideas expressed in the 1950s by French neo-fascist activist René Binet. "Biological realism", a concept coined by Binet in 1950, advocated the establishment of individual and racial inequalities founded upon scientific observations. He argued that "interbreeding capitalism" (capitalisme métisseur) aimed at creating a "uniform barbary" (barbarie uniforme), and that only "a true socialism" could "achieve race liberation" through the "absolute segregation at both global and national level."

In the 1960s, the euro-nationalist magazine Europe-Action, in which Alain de Benoist then worked as a journalist, drew influence from the so-called "Message of Uppsala", a text likely written in 1958 by French far-right activists related to the New European Order, a neo-fascist movement led by Binet. It carried out subtle semantic shifts between "differentialism" and "inequality" which are deemed influential on European far-right movements at large.

== Concept ==
The concept, which has been part of the ideological foundation of European New Right, emphasizes the separation of varying ethno-cultural groups, as opposed to cultural integration and intra-state multiculturalism. Ethnopluralism tends to rely on cultural assimilation of foreign cultural norms in order to preserve the inherent forms and resemblances of a given ethno-culture, which has a right to claim cultural dominance over a defined territory. It has been proposed by Nouvelle Droite thinkers, and embraced by European New Right activists at large, as a mean to facilitate the continuity of distinct ethno-cultural societies as politically autonomous entities. De Benoist claims that indigenous cultures in Europe are being threatened by the liberal worldview promoted by the United States, and that pan-European nationalism founded on the idea of ethnopluralism would stop this process. In 2002, he described the "progressive disappearance of diversity from the world", including biodiversity of animals, cultures and peoples, as the "greatest" world danger.

These views on culture, ethnicity and race have become popular among European far-right groups from the 1970s onward and, more recently, in alt-right circles in North America. It has also been covered in some New Left sources like Telos.

=== Plasticity ===
The difficulty of defining clearly the concept lies in the fact that its proponents can oscillate between a genetic and a cultural definition of the notion of "difference". Alain de Benoist had for instance supported an ethno-biological perspective in the 1960s, endorsing South African apartheid during the same decade. He has however gradually adopted a more dual approach in his writings. Inspired by Martin Buber's philosophy of dialogue and Ich und Du concept, de Benoist defined "identity" as a "dialogical" phenomenon in We and the Others ("Nous et les autres", 2006). According to him, one's identity is made of two components: the "objective part" that comes from one's background (ethnicity, religion, family, nationality), and the "subjective part", freely chosen by the individual. Identity is therefore a process in constant evolution, rather than an immutable notion. In 1992, he consequently dismissed the Front National use of ethnopluralism, on the grounds that it portrayed "difference as an absolute, whereas, by definition, it exists only relationally." While Guillaume Faye argued in 1979 that immigration, rather than immigrants, should be combated in order to preserve cultural and biological "identities" on both sides of the Mediterranean Sea, he later preached "total ethnic war" between "original" Europeans and Muslims in his 2000 book The Colonization of Europe, which led to a criminal conviction for hate speech.

If ethnopluralists use the concept of "cultural differentialism" to assert a "right to difference" and propose regional policies of ethnic and racial separatism, there is no agreement among them upon the definition of group membership, nor where these hypothetical borders would lie. Some of them advocate limiting Europe to "true Europeans" (that is people of European descent), while others propose much smaller divisions, similar to an ethnically-based communitarianism. For instance, de Benoist has proposed ethnic and social territories should be as small as possible, such that Muslims would be allowed some territories subordinated to sharia within the European continent.

== Critics ==
Ethnopluralism has been criticised by philosopher Pierre-André Taguieff as a strategic attempt to disguise racial supremacist ideas behind an anti-totalitarian and egalitarian discourse. Scholar Daniel Rueda locates the emergence of ethnopluralism as part of a "cultural turn in racism", that is, "the passage from biological and pseudoscientific racism to alterophobic discourses based on culture and ethnicity among European far-right intellectuals." In the words of political scientist Blair Taylor, "many contemporary far-right groups have traded in the language of overt white supremacy for ethnopluralism, a vision wherein distinct groups live separately but allegedly equal, free to pursue their ethnic interests. Ethnopluralism is often embedded in the discourse of diversity, capitalizing on the progressive antiracist and environmental associations".

Left-wing historian Rasmus Fleischer has speculated that Jews and Roma are implicitly absent from the ethnopluralist world map because, in the vision of "multi-fascists", both minorities should be "eliminated in order to make room for a peaceful utopia."

== See also ==
- Archeofuturism
- Ethnonationalism
- Cultural assimilation
- Cultural racism
- Separatism
- Ethnocracy
- Europe of 100 Flags
- GRECE

== Bibliography ==
- Bar-On, Tamir (2001). "The Ambiguities of the Nouvelle Droite, 1968–1999". The European Legacy. 6 (3): 333–351. doi:10.1080/10848770120051349. S2CID 144359964 – via Taylor & Francis.
- Bar-On, Tamir (2011). "Intellectual Right - Wing Extremism – Alain de Benoist's Mazeway Resynthesis since 2000". In Backes, Uwe; Moreau, Patrick (eds.). The Extreme Right in Europe (1 ed.). Vandenhoeck & Ruprecht. pp. 333–358. doi:10.13109/9783666369223.333. ISBN 978-3-525-36922-7.
- Camus, Jean-Yves; Lebourg, Nicolas (2017). Far-Right Politics in Europe. Harvard University Press. ISBN 9780674971530.
- Deland, Mats; Minkenberg, Michael; Mays, Christin (2014). In the Tracks of Breivik: Far Right Networks in Northern and Eastern Europe. LIT Verlag Münster. ISBN 9783643905420.
- François, Stéphane (23 May 2013). "Dominique Venner et le renouvellement du racisme". Fragments sur les Temps Présents.
- Lebourg, Nicolas (2 November 2020). "René Binet, the French Father of White Nationalism". Illiberalism.org.
- McCulloch, Tom (2006). "The Nouvelle Droite in the 1980s and 1990s: Ideology and Entryism, the Relationship with the Front National". French Politics. 4 (2): 158–178. doi:10.1057/palgrave.fp.8200099. ISSN 1476-3419. S2CID 144813395.
- Rueda, Daniel (2021). "Alain de Benoist, ethnopluralism and the cultural turn in racism". Patterns of Prejudice. 55 (3): 213–235. doi:10.1080/0031322X.2021.1920722. ISSN 0031-322X. S2CID 244558523.
- Shields, James (2007). The Extreme Right in France: From Pétain to Le Pen. Routledge. ISBN 9781134861118.
- Spektorowska, Alberto (2003). "The New Right: ethno-regionalism, ethno-pluralism and the emergence of a neo-fascist 'Third Way'". Journal of Political Ideologies. 8: 111–130. doi:10.1080/13569310306084. S2CID 143042182.
- Taguieff, Pierre-André (1981). "L'Héritage nazi. Des Nouvelles Droites européennes à la littérature niant le génocide". Les Nouveaux Cahiers (64).
- Taguieff, Pierre-André (1985). "Le néo-racisme différentialiste. Sur l'ambiguïté d'une évidence commune et ses effets pervers". Langage & Société. 34 (1): 69–98. doi:10.3406/lsoc.1985.2039.
- Taguieff, Pierre-André (2001). The Force of Prejudice: On Racism and Its Doubles. University of Minnesota Press. ISBN 978-0-8166-2373-0.
- Taylor, Blair (2019). "Alt-Right Ecology: Ecofascism and far-right environmentalism in the United States". The Far Right and the Environment. Routledge. doi:10.4324/9781351104043-16. ISBN 978-1-351-10404-3. S2CID 213586588.
