= Nouvelle Droite =

French far-right political movement emerging in the 1960s

The Nouvelle Droite (French: [nuvɛl dʁwat], lit. 'New Right'), sometimes shortened to the initialism ND, is a far-right political movement which emerged in France during the late 1960s. The Nouvelle Droite is the origin of the wider European New Right (ENR). Various scholars of political science have argued that it is a form of fascism or neo-fascism, although the movement eschews these terms.

The Nouvelle Droite began with the formation of the GRECE (Groupement de recherche et d'études pour la civilisation européenne; Research and Study Group for European Civilization), a French group guided largely by the philosopher Alain de Benoist, in Nice in 1968. De Benoist and other early GRECE members had long been involved in far-right politics, and their new movement was influenced by older rightist currents of thought like the German conservative revolutionary movement. Although rejecting left-wing ideas of human equality, the Nouvelle Droite was also heavily influenced by the tactics of the New Left and some forms of Marxism. Particularly influential were the sociocultural ideas of the Italian Marxist Antonio Gramsci, with ND members describing themselves as the "Gramscians of the Right". The ND achieved a level of mainstream respectability in France during the 1970s, although their reputation and influence declined following sustained liberal and leftist anti-fascist opposition. Members of the Nouvelle Droite joined several political parties, becoming a particularly strong influence within the far-right French National Front, while ND ideas also influenced far-right groups elsewhere in Europe. In the 21st century, the ND has influenced multiple far-right groups, such as the Identitarian movement and forms of national-anarchism.

The ND opposes multiculturalism and the mixing of different cultures within a single society, opposes liberal democracy and capitalism, and promotes localised forms of what it terms "organic democracy", with the intent of rooting out elements of oligarchy. It pushes for an "archeofuturistic" or a type of non-reactionary "revolutionary conservative" method to the reinvigoration of the Pan-European identity and culture, while encouraging the preservation of certain regions where Europeans and their Caucasian descendants may reside. Concurrently, it attempts to sustain the protection of the variance of ethnicities and identities around the globe, defending the right of each group of people to keep their own lands and regions to occupy. To achieve its goals, the ND promotes what it calls "metapolitics", seeking to influence and shift European culture in ways sympathetic to its cause over a lengthy period of time rather than by actively campaigning for office through political parties.

== History ==
Following the end of the Second World War and the collapse of the Vichy regime, the French extreme-right was driven underground. It resurfaced as a force able to contest elections in the mid-1950s, when some far-right activists successfully returned to the public arena through the Poujadist movement. In the following two decades, the country's extreme-right movement then rallied around the cause of the French Empire, opposing the decolonisation movements that were gaining strength in Indochina and Algeria. A number of far-right paramilitary groups were formed in this environment, including the Secret Army Organisation (Organisation armée secrète - OAS) and the Revolutionary Army (Armée Révolutionnaire - AR). Adopting another approach, a number of extreme-right intellectuals decided that they would try to make many of their ideas more socially respectable through the creation of the Research and Study Group for European Civilisation (GRECE). The acronym means "Greece" in French, and the organization has emphasized the pagan values of Ancient Greece.

=== 1968–1974: Establishing GRECE ===
GRECE was founded in the southern French city of Nice in January 1968, shortly before the May 1968 events in France. It initially had forty members, among the most prominent of whom were Alain de Benoist, Pierre Vial, Jean-Claude Valla, Dominique Venner, Jacques Bruyas and Jean-Jacques Mourreau. The political scientist Tamir Bar-On has stated that "the intellectual evolution of both GRECE and leading ND intellectuals is definitely situated within the revolutionary Right milieu". GRECE has been described as a "logical alternative" for those "young French nationalist militants" to join, given the 1958 dissolution of the Jeune Nation group, the 1962 collapse of the OAS, and the defeat of the European Rally for Liberty in the 1967 legislative election. These young radicals were ultra-nationalists and anti-communists, and centred their beliefs around a defence of Western society, scientific racism, and eugenics. They were opposed to the migration of non-white peoples from former French colonies into France itself, and this led them to adopt anti-colonial and anti-imperialist perspectives.

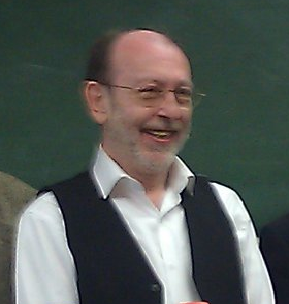
De Benoist, the "undisputed leader" of the ND, in 2011

De Benoist came to be regarded as the "undisputed leader" of the Nouvelle Droite, and its "most authoritative spokesman". He had previously been a member of the ultra-nationalist Fédération des Étudiants Nationalistes and involved with the racialist Europe-Action journal, both of which have been characterised as reflecting ND ideas in their "embryonic form". GRECE inherited a number of key themes from Europe-Action, among them "the anti-Christian stance, a marked elitism, the racial notion of a united Europe, the seeds of a change from biological to cultural definitions of "difference," and the sophisticated inversion of terms like racism and anti-racism". De Benoit was also influenced by the Conservative Revolutionary movement of interwar Germany—including thinkers like Ernst Jünger, Arthur Moeller van den Bruck, and Oswald Spengler—and in the 1970s the ND helped to promote a revived interest in these conservative revolutionaries.

GRECE circulated an internal document in which it urged members not to employ "outdated language" that might associate the group with older fascist sectors of the far right. It also urged its members to socialise with some of France and Europe's most important decision-makers, so as to better set the ground for its goals. GRECE did not remain a homogeneous intellectual movement but contained different and sometimes conflicting perspectives. The ND learned from the unrest of 1968 as well as from the wider New Left movement of that decade, adopting the idea that the promotion of cultural ideas is a precondition for political change. De Benoist noted that the French left had not been elected into office since the end of the Second World War but that nevertheless leftist ideas had gained considerable traction in French society, particularly among intellectuals. He sought to change the values and assumptions of French society in a similar way, by shifting the prevailing ideology without the need for any electoral victories.

GRECE held a number of seminars and colloquia with varying degrees of success. It also began to issue a number of semi-academic publications through which it could promote its views. Its journal, Nouvelle École, initially circulated among the group's members although went into public circulation from 1969 onwards. A review, Éléments, was then made public in 1973. Over the course of 1975 and 1976 it issued bulletins promoting its message among medical, educational, and military circles. In 1976, GRECE launched its own publishing house, known as Copernic.

=== 1975–79: Growth and opposition ===
Though it took nearly ten years for this Nouvelle Droite to be discovered by the media, its elitist discourse, its claims to be scientific and its emphasis on European culturalism were influential throughout the 1970s in rehabilitating a number of ideas previously held to be indefensible. The New Right's strategy of intellectual rearmament was the polar opposite of commando activism, but continuity of personnel and, in substance (though not in form), of major tenets can be traced back to the OAS and beyond.

— Michalina Vaughan, 1995

The expression nouvelle droite was not originally a term of self-appellation. It first appeared in a series of articles on GRECE written by the journalist Gilbert Comte and published in Le Monde in March 1978 which were titled "Une nouvelle droite?". It was applied at a time when the appellation "nouvelle" was being given to a wide range of developments in French intellectual and cultural life, including the nouveaux philosophes, the nouveaux historiens, and nouveaux économistes, as well as nouvelle cuisine.

By the late 1970s, the ND had captured the political zeitgeist in France, reaching its mass media heyday. During these years, intellectuals affiliated with the movement published articles in the mainstream magazine Le Figaro, edited by Louis Pauwels. In 1978, De Benoist's Vu de droite won the prestigious Prix de l'essai from the Académie Française. The ND's growth raised concerns among many liberal and leftist intellectuals in France, who claimed that it was a racist, fascist, and Vichyite movement that sought to undermine liberal democracy, egalitarianism, and the legacy of the French Revolution of 1789. A campaign calling for the rejection of the ND was embraced by media outlets like Le Monde, Le Nouvel Observateur, L'Express, and La Croix, resulting in Le Figaro withdrawing its patronage of the movement. The ND claimed that it was facing a form of intellectual persecution akin to McCarthyism. Now deprived of a popular platform, the ND accelerated away from biological racism and toward the claim that different ethno-cultural groups should be kept separate in order to preserve their historical and cultural differences.

In 1974, a group called The Club was established by several GRECE members—notably Jean-Yves Le Gallou and Yvan Blot, along with Henry de Lesquen,—to serve as an elite think tank for ND ideas. The club was frustrated with GRECE's long-term metapolitical strategy and sought to hasten the speed of change, with its members joining political parties like the Rally for the Republic (RFR) and Union for French Democracy (UDF). By the late 1970s, the Club de l'Horloge had moved away from GRECE by both endorsing economic neoliberalism and embracing Roman Catholicism as a core aspect of France's national identity, something in contrast to GRECE's anti-Christian bent.

=== 1980-99: Affiliation with Front national ===
In the early 1980s, a number of ND-affiliated intellectuals—among them Jean Haudry, Jean Varenne, Pierre Vial, Jean-Claude Bardet, and Pierre de Meuse—came out in support of the extreme-right National Front (FN) party, which was then growing in support under the leadership of Jean-Marie Le Pen. The FN were influenced by the ND in their platforms and slogans, adopting the ND's emphasis on ethno-cultural differentialism. The Club called for the RFR and UDF to enter into a political alliance with the FN to defeat the Socialist Party government of President François Mitterrand, although this did not happen.

In 1994, there were four ND-affiliated individuals on the FN politburo, making it the second most influential faction within the party. Within the FN, there were tensions between the ND-affiliated factions and other groups, most particularly the Catholic faction which rejected the ND's exultation of paganism. There were also tensions between the FN nouvelle droitistes and the wider ND, in particular with the wing influenced by De Benoist.

De Benoist openly criticised Le Pen's party, condemning its populism as being at odds with GRECE's emphasis on elitism, and expressing opposition to the FN's use of immigrants as scapegoats for France's problems. He may have been seeking to distinguish his GRECE with the FN, being aware that the two had much overlap.

In 1993, a group of 40 French intellectuals signed "The Appeal to Vigilance", which was published in Le Monde. This warned of "the resurgence of anti-democratic currents of far Right thought in French and European intellectual life" and called for a boycott against ND-affiliated intellectuals. In 1994, the appeal was again published, this time having been signed by 1500 European intellectuals.

== Ideology ==
The ND has gone through several doctrinal renewals since its creation in 1968 and, according to political scientist Stéphane François, "it has never been a centralized and homogeneous school of dogmatic thought. The positions supported by New Right thinkers vary enormously, ranging from extreme right wing to variants of anarchism. Despite these, ... GRECE and ex-GRECE thinkers are united by common doctrinal references." Philosopher Pierre-André Taguieff has distinguished five ideological periods within the history of the ND: the rejection of the Judeo-Christian heritage and the ethnocentric "religion of human rights"; a critique of the liberal and socialist "egalitarian utopias" in the 1970s; a praise of the "Indo-European heritage" and paganism, perceived as the "true religion" of the Europeans; a critique of a market-driven and "economist" vision of the world and liberal utilitarianism; the advocacy of a radical ethnic differentialism, eventually evolving in the 1990s towards a cultural relativism inspired by Claude Lévi-Strauss and Robert Jaulin.

Some of the prominent names that have collaborated with GRECE include Arthur Koestler, Hans Eysenck, Konrad Lorenz, Mircea Eliade, Raymond Abellio, Thierry Maulnier, Anthony Burgess and Jean Parvulesco.

=== Relation with fascism ===
The majority of political scientists locate the ND on the extreme-right or far-right of the political spectrum. A number of liberal and leftist critics have described it as a new or sanitized form of neo-fascism or as an ideology of the extreme right that significantly draws from fascism. The political scientist and specialist of fascism Roger Griffin agrees, arguing that the ND exhibits what he regards as the two defining aspects of fascism: a populist ultra-nationalism and a call for national rebirth (palingenesis). McCulloch believes that the ND had a "distinctly fascist–revivalist character" in part because of its constant reference to earlier right-wing ideologues like the German Conservative Revolutionaries and French figures the likes of Robert Brasillach, Georges Valois, Pierre Drieu La Rochelle, and Thierry Maulnier. The Nouvelle Droite has also revered the Italian far right thinker Julius Evola, who remains a potent symbol in the movement. In 1981, the editorial team of the ND journal Éléments wrote that "[w]ithout sharing all his views and all his analysis, the writers of Éléments agree to recognize in [him] one of the most lucid and insightful observers of our times."

McCulloch saw parallels in the ND's desire for ethnically and culturally homogeneous European societies, its hostility to egalitarianism and universalist modernity, and its call for a cultural rebirth. The ND rejects the labels of "fascism" and "extreme right". De Benoist has himself been described as a neo-fascist, although he has rejected the label of "fascist", claiming that it has only been used by his critics "for the sole purpose of delegitimizing or discrediting" his ideas. The ND's members have argued that their critique of capitalism and liberal democracy are different from the criticisms articulated by Nazism and older forms of fascism and the far right.

=== Appropriation of leftism ===
The Nouvelle Droite has distinguished itself from the mainstream right by embracing anti-capitalist, anti-American, pro-Third World, anti-nationalist, federalist, and environmentalist positions which were traditionally associated with left-wing politics. This blend of traditionally leftist and rightist ideas, which has long been recognised as a characteristic of fascism, has generated much ambiguity surrounding the ND's ideological position, and has led to confusion among political activists and even academics. The ND describes itself as situated beyond both left and right.

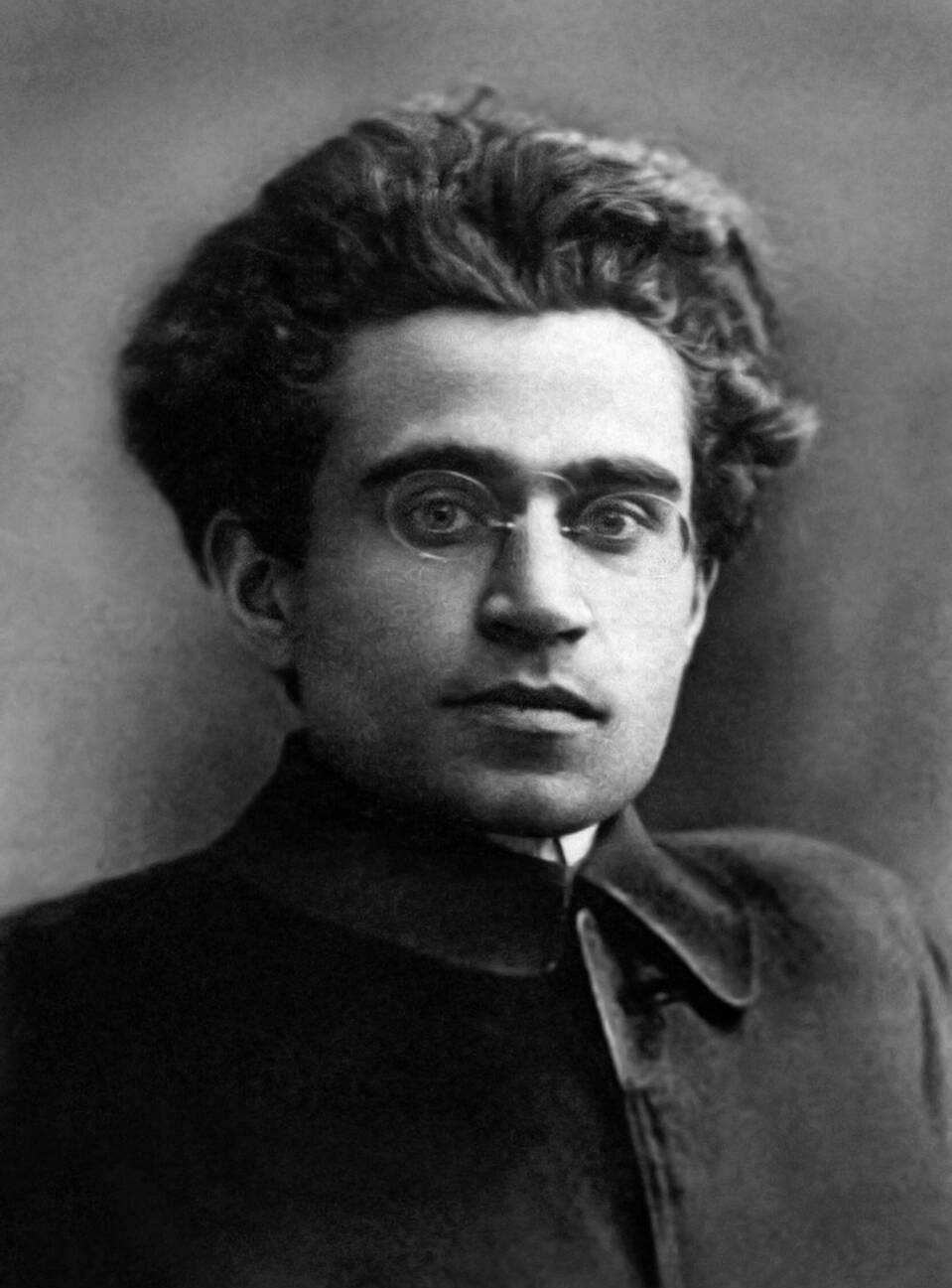
The ND takes influence from Marxist thinkers like Antonio Gramsci.

The political scientist Alberto Spektorowski espoused the view that the ND "has indeed seriously moved from its positions of old-style right-wing nationalism and racism to a new type of leftist regionalism and ethno-pluralism". Cultural critics have largely characterised the ND as a right-wing phenomenon, a categorisation endorsed by the political scientist Tamir Bar-On, who expresses the view that "ND thinkers have never fully transcended their original revolutionary right-wing roots." Bar-On interpreted the ND's use of leftist ideas as part of its "survival strategy", also noting that it was "a subtle attempt to resurrect some of the ideals of the revolutionary Right". McCulloch believed that the ND was "a deliberate attempt to paint certain ideological concepts in less compromised colours", while Griffin stated that the ND's claims to transcend the Left and Right was "an impressive piece of sleight of hand by the ND which disguises its extreme right-wing identity".

The Nouvelle Droite was deeply indebted to ideas drawn from the New Left movement. ND thinkers borrowed heavily from the Italian Marxist Antonio Gramsci, and its proponents have described themselves as "Gramscians of the Right". Among the other Marxist thinkers whose work has been utilised by the ND have been Frankfurt School intellectuals Theodor Adorno and Max Horkheimer and Neo-Marxists like Louis Althusser and Herbert Marcuse. Other leftists have also been cited as influences by various ND figures, with former GRECE secretary-general Pierre Vial for instance praising Che Guevara, the Italian Red Brigades and the German Red Army Faction for their willingness to die fighting against capitalist liberal democracy. During the 1984 election to the European Parliament, De Benoist announced his intention to vote for the French Communist Party, deeming them to be the only credible anti-capitalist, anti-liberal, and anti-American political force then active in France. In 1997, he referred to The Greens as the only French political party that challenged the materialist and industrialist values of Western society.

De Benoist states that the Nouvelle Droite "has a certain number of characteristics of the Left and a certain number of characteristics of the Right." He has also expressed the view that the left-right political divide has "lost any operative value to analyze the field of ideological or political discourse", for "the new divides that have been emerging for the last few decades no longer coincide with the old left-right distinction".

=== Metapolitics and strategy ===
GRECE has promoted the project of slowly infusing society with its ideas and rhetoric in the hope of achieving cultural dominance, which would then allow for the assumption of political power. Vial stated that "Politics is not the affair of GRECE. It is to be placed on another, more fundamental level. GRECE intends to work on the meta-political level [...] where a collective mentality and therefore a popular consensus is elaborated". De Benoist has called for the overthrow of liberal democracy through a long-term metapolitical strategy. Although it rejects liberal democracy, the Nouvelle Droite is not inherently anti-democratic, calling instead for a localised form of what it calls "organic democracy". De Benoist has maintained that the Nouvelle Droite has never endorsed a particular political party, and that its purpose has been as having "always adopted a position of observer, never of actor. It produces analyses and thought; it offers a theoretical corpus; it accomplishes intellectual and cultural work. Nothing else."

The Nouvelle Droite critiques both modernity and post-modernity. It opposes global capitalism and liberalism, and valorises regionalism, federalism, socialism and local forms of democracy. It rejects the principle of human equality, arguing that humans are not born free and equal and that society is inherently hierarchical. It stressed the need for elites, claiming that this would allow for harmonious social hierarchy in which all people are aware of their particular responsibilities and tasks.

Inspired by the French example, Italian activists were soon closely aligned. One quote from that era goes:

For this reason we chose a metapolitical strategy that, according to Gramsci's teachings, allows us to gain cultural power before political power, which does not exclude that in the near future someone could bring our cultural programs to a more political plane. Since I do not think that the same people should do the cultural and political work, and also because people have natural predispositions for one or the other, I have chosen to be a cultural operator and I have no intention of transforming myself into a political man.

Another influential quote to this effect:

Right in front of us the path of “metapolitics” became clear. That is to say, it was something that did not disregard political needs but transcended them, to comprehend them in a more vast, more complex design that implicated profound ideological revisions (without changing the vision of the world) and cultural roots [...] And certainly, talking about cinema and comic books, of politology and the sciences, of etiology and energy, of sexuality and celebration, of community and sport, of literature and art was different from evoking the past and envisioning apotheosis. The New Right is this as well, a project for taking back daily life, free time, the world of personal interests, a recognition of that which is different-from-us. Perhaps less than we believe. An admission of plurality against monomaniacal ends. A proposal not for leaving the world, but for taking it back.

=== Ethno-pluralism ===
The ND has criticised the liberal emphasis on the rights of individuals and instead foregrounded the rights of groups. The ND exhibits a hostility to multiculturalism and to cultural mixing. Multicultural societies are viewed by the ND as a form of "ethnocide". GRECE has stated that it is against immigration but that it would not expect settled ethno-cultural minorities in France to emigrate en masse. Instead it favours separation of the different ethno-cultural groups within France, with each emphasising its own cultural identity and not integrating and mixing with the others. It supports homogeneity within a society. GRECE called on Europe and the Third World to work together on establishing this global ethno-cultural segregation and combating any homogenizing identities. Critics have argued that the ND's attitude in this regard is akin to older fascist preoccupations with the ideas of cultural or racial purity. It shares this belief in diversity in isolation with the FN. Spektorowski suggests that the ND's views on cultural difference and segregation seek to relegate the Third World to an inferior position on the world stage, by advising agrarian societies to remain as they are and not industrialise while allowing Europe to retain its more technologically advanced position.

The ND advocates for the establishment of a federal Europe based on ethnically homogeneous regional communities.

The ND does not espouse the view that Europe's technological superiority marks Europeans out as a superior race. De Benoit has stated that "the European race is not the absolute superior race. It is only the most apt to progress".

De Benoit long adhered to ethnic nationalist ideas although sought to develop a form of nationalism that deconstructed the nation-state. GRECE promoted the replacement of the French Republic with a "federal republic of French peoples" which would in turn form part of a wider ethnic federation of European peoples. According to the ND, the ethnic-region would not have need to establish draconian laws against immigrants who were ethnically different, but would have impenetrable cultural barriers to keep them out. Ideas about such a regionalised federal Europe are akin to those of earlier far right and fascist thinkers like Drieu La Rochelle, Dominique Venner and Jean Mabire. In his analysis of the ND's beliefs about their ideal future, Spektorowski states that any society established along the ND lines would resemble apartheid-era South Africa, would be a form of totalitarianism based on the politics of identity, and would be "a permanent nightmare for old immigrants and for political and ideological dissenters".

Opposing global capitalism and an unrestricted free market, GRECE promoted a communitarian form of capitalism. While celebrating and defending Western civilisation, GRECE condemned Westernisation. The ND was equally critical of both the Soviet Union and the United States. The ND exhibits an intense Anti-Americanism, rejecting what it perceives as the hyper-capitalist ethos of the United States. It claims that both Europe and the Third World are allies in a struggle against American cultural imperialism. Within the ND, there is no overt anti-Semitism. McCulloch argued that anti-Semitic conspiracy theories were nevertheless present in the ND-affiliated members of the FN. In the early 1990s, Georges Charbonneau announced that GRECE officially repudiated Holocaust denial. However, one of the organisation's founders, Jean-Claude Valla, has stated that he personally believes the claims of Holocaust deniers.

=== Paganism ===
The ND rejects the monotheistic legacy of the Judeo-Christian tradition. They claim that the Christian heritage of Europe has generated an egalitarian ethos which has since developed into such secular variants as liberalism, social democracy, and socialism. It condemns the monotheism of Christianity as exhibiting a totalitarian ethos which seeks to impose a Western ethos on the world's many different cultures. According to Vial, "totalitarianism was born 4000 years ago ... It was born the day monotheism appeared. The idea of monotheism implies the submission of the human being to the will of a single, eternal God". GRECE was avowedly pro-pagan, viewing pre-Christian Europe in positive terms as a healthy and diverse, polytheistic continent. The ND's opposition to Christianity has resulted in it rejecting the ideas of the Old Catholic Right and the neo-liberal Anglo–American Right. It nevertheless accepts that other cultural groups should be free to pursue monotheistic beliefs if they see fit, expressing the view that "Judaism is certainly right for the Jews, as Islam is for the Arabs, and we cannot accept the racist practice of imposing our cultural model on foreign peoples."

=== Currents ===
Under the GRECE umbrella have been found a variety of thinkers and activists, including "European imperialists, traditionalists influenced by Julius Evola and René Guénon, communitarians, post-modernists, Völkisch nostalgics, anti-Judeo-Christian pagans". Taguieff has distinguished four different currents within the Nouvelle Droite: the traditionalists – influenced by integral traditionalism, the "revolutionary Traditionalism" of Evola, and often by anti-Catholicism –, the "modern", then "post-modern" neo-conservatives – inspired by the German Conservative Revolution –, the ethnic communitarianists – influenced by the "populist-racist" Völkisch movement –, and the positivist – who exalt science and modern technique in a form of scientism. Amidst this diversity, the ideological core of the ND remains "the defence of identity (of whatever kind) and a refusal of egalitarianism".

== Beyond France ==
The Nouvelle Droite, and its German counterpart the Neue Rechte, have influenced the ideological and political structure of the European Identitarian Movement. Part of the alt-right also claims to have been inspired by De Benoist's writings.

By the end of the 1980s, publications espousing Nouvelle Droite ideas had appeared in various European countries, namely Belgium, Spain, Italy, and Germany. Works by Alain de Benoist and Guillaume Faye have been translated into various European languages, in English in particular by Arktos Media, described as the "uncontested global leader in the publication of English-language Nouvelle Droite literature."

Although mostly known in France, according to Minkenberg, the Nouvelle Droite borders to other European "New Right" movements, such as Neue Rechte in Germany, New Right in the United Kingdom, Nieuw Rechts in the Netherlands and Flanders, Forza Nuova in Italy, Imperium Europa in Malta, Nova Hrvatska Desnica in Croatia, Noua Dreapta in Romania and the New Right of Paul Weyrich and the Free Congress Foundation in the United States.

=== United States ===
After 2006, Faye has taken part in conventions organized by American white supremacist Jared Taylor, who have favourably reviewed his book in his magazine American Renaissance. Both of them believe that white people need to join in a worldwide fight for their racial, cultural, and demographic survival. His ideas have also been discussed by the American alt-right website Counter-Currents, and the writings of Faye and de Benoist, especially their metapolitical stance, have influenced American far-right activist Richard B. Spencer.

The American New Right cannot, however, be ideologically confused with its European counterpart. The European New Right is similar to the Cultural Conservatism movement led by Paul Weyrich and the Free Congress Foundation, and to the related traditionalism of paleoconservatives such as Pat Buchanan and the Chronicles magazine of the Rockford Institute (Diamond, Himmelstein, Berlet and Lyons). However these subgroups of the New Right coalition in the United States are closely tied to Christianity, which the Nouvelle Droite rejects, describing itself as a pagan movement. Both Jonathan Marcus, Martin Lee and Alain de Benoist himself have highlighted these important differences with the US New Right coalition.

As Martin Lee explains,

By rejecting Christianity as an alien ideology that was forced upon the Indo-European peoples two millennia ago, French New Rightists distinguished themselves from the so-called New Right that emerged in the United States during the 1970s. Ideologically, [the European new Right group] GRECE had little in common with the American New Right, which [the European new Right ideologue] de Benoist dismissed as a puritanical, moralistic crusade that clung pathetically to Christianity as the be-all and end-all of Western civilization.

=== United Kingdom ===
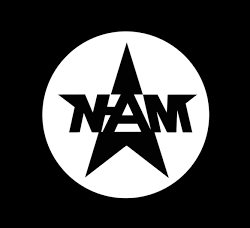
Nouvelle Droite ideas have influenced the National Anarchist movement (logo pictured), established in Britain by Troy Southgate.

The Nouvelle Droite also developed a presence in the United Kingdom, where the term "New Right" was more closely associated with the Thatcherite policies introduced under the Conservative Party administration of Prime Minister Margaret Thatcher. Britain's far right first collaborated with the Nouvelle Droite in 1979, when a GRECE delegation met with the League of St. George in London. It was claimed that the meeting went well, although there was no further collaboration between the groups. The Nouvelle Droite's ideas were pursued in a more sustained way in Britain when far right activist Michael Walker launched the National Democrat magazine in 1981, renaming it The Scorpion in 1983. Walker had been a senior member of Britain's fascist National Front, and believed that the latter party had failed to achieve its goals because it had neither engaged with culture nor won over intellectuals to its cause. He felt that the Nouvelle Droite thinkers could aid the British far right by challenging two of its "sacred cows": biological racism and conspiracy theories. In his publication, Walker produced translations of some of De Benoit and Faye's writings. During the 1980s and into the early 1990s, Walker co-organised several conferences with a group called Islands of the North Atlantic (IONA), which was led by Richard Lawson; these conferences were attended by Nouvelle Droite figures like De Benoist.

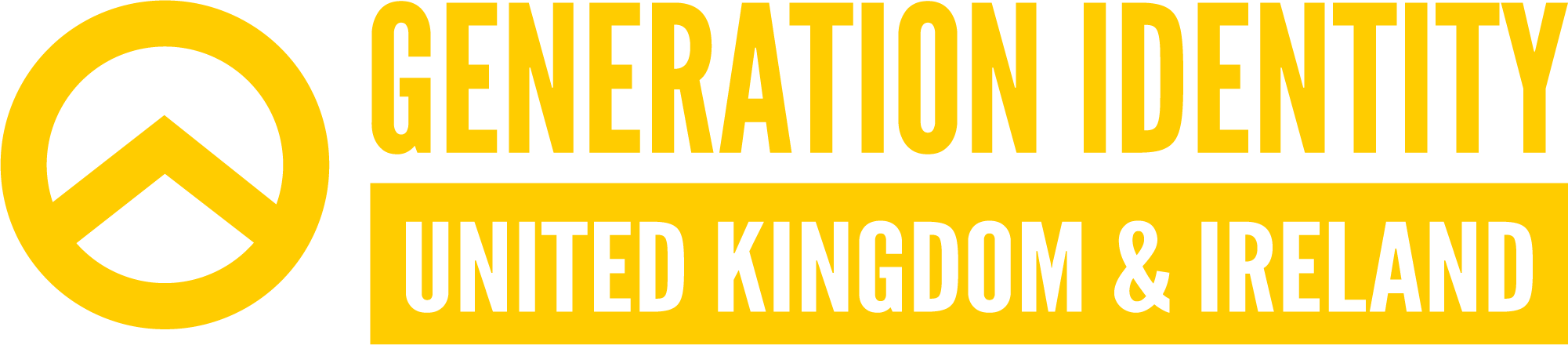
Generation Identity UK, also known as the Identitiarian Movement UK, bases its ideology on the Nouvelle Droite.

After Walker left Britain for Cologne, his role as promoter of the Nouvelle Droite in Britain was taken on by Lawson, who launched the meta-political magazine Perspectives in the early 1990s; this was re-launched as Radical Shift in 1997, but remained uninfluential. In the mid-1990s, some hard right Conservatives co-operated with members of the fascist British National Party (BNP) to establish the Bloomsbury Forum, a self-described "New Right" group based in Bloomsbury which modelled itself on GRECE. After Nick Griffin took over the BNP in 1999, he reformed it in a manner closely based on the French National Front and thus influenced by the Nouvelle Droite. In certain ways Griffin's BNP remained distinct from the Nouvelle Droite, however, for instance by not embracing the latter's wholesale rejection of Christianity. The terminology of the Nouvelle Droite, in particular that surrounding "ethno-pluralism", has also been adopted by the British National Anarchist Troy Southgate.

The Identitarian Movement UK launched in 2017 espouses the ideas of the Nouvelle Droite citing Guillaume Faye and Alain de Benoist as inspirations.

== Reception ==
The Nouvelle Droite has been the subject of various studies since its emergence in the 1970s and had gained a wide range of enemies as well as some unexpected supporters. Although many liberals and socialists have claimed that the ND has not ideologically shifted away from earlier forms of the far right, and that it should be socially ostracised, the leftist journal Telos has praised the ND's ability to transcend the left-right paradigm. The ND has been equally criticized by sectors of both the left and the right, for instance having been condemned by both the Anglo-American right for its anti-capitalist and anti-American views, and by the French Catholic right for its anti-Christian views.

== See also ==
- History of far-right movements in France
- Politics of France
- Identitarianism, a similar movement originating in France
- Alt-right, a far right movement influenced by the ideas of the Nouvelle Droite
- National Bolshevism
- Conservative Revolution
- Third Position
- Neue Rechte
