= GRECE =

French ethno-nationalist think-tank

Groupement de recherche et d'études pour la civilisation européenne
- Abbreviation: GRECE
- Formation: 1968; 58 years ago
- Founder: Alain de Benoist, Dominique Venner, Giorgio Locchi, Maurice Rollet, Pierre Vial, Jean-Claude Valla, and 34 others.
- Purpose: European nationalism; Ethnopluralism; Neopaganism

The Groupement de Recherche et d'Études pour la Civilisation Européenne ("Research and Study Group for European Civilization"), better known as GRECE, is a French ethnonationalist think tank founded in 1968 to promote the ideas of the Nouvelle Droite ("New Right"). GRECE founding member Alain de Benoist has been described as its leader and "most authoritative spokesman". Prominent former members include Guillaume Faye and Jean-Yves Le Gallou.

GRECE is deeply opposed to multiculturalism, liberal democracy, capitalism, and distinguishes itself from other national-conservative organizations in its specific rejection of Christianity and endorsement of neopaganism. The group defends a nonreactionary "conservative revolution" aiming at the rejuvenation of a pan-European identity and nationalism, while supporting the preservation and separation of ethnic groups and cultures at the worldwide level. GRECE members have coined and promoted influential concepts in the Western far right, such as "ethnopluralism" and "archeofuturism".

== History ==
=== Background ===
The dissolution of the neo-fascist organization Jeune Nation in 1958 and the disappearance of the pro-colonial paramilitary group Organisation Armée Secrète (OAS) in 1962, as well as the failures of far-right candidate Jean-Louis Tixier-Vignancour in the 1965 presidential election and of the European Rally for Liberty (REL) in the 1967 legislative election, are cited as events conducive to the foundation of GRECE and the development of its meta-political strategy.

The philosophy of GRECE drew inspiration from earlier essays and theories developed by the euronationalist magazine Europe-Action (1963–66)—headed by Dominique Venner and in which Alain de Benoist worked as a journalist—, most notably Venner's manifesto Pour une critique positive ("Towards a positive criticism"), written while imprisoned in 1962. Abandoning the myth of the coup de force (putsch), Venner asserted that far-right movements had to be at the origin of a cultural and non-violent revolution, via the diffusion of nationalist ideas in society until they reach cultural dominance. Another influence can be found in the "Manifesto of the Class of '60", published in 1960 by the initiators of the Federation of Nationalist Students (FEN), a far-right and pro-colonial students' organization. Committing themselves to "action of profound consequence", the authors sought to break with the "sterile activism" of violent insurrection previously espoused by Jeune Nation (1949–58). Venner and de Benoist had been previously active in Jeune Nation and the FEN, respectively.

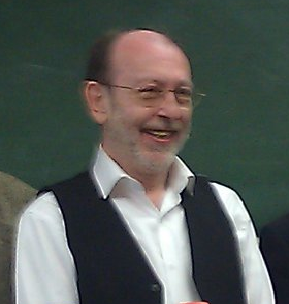
Alain de Benoist in 2011.

Following the electoral failure of the European Rally for Liberty (1966–1969), some of its members – among them de Benoist, helped by an informal group of FEN militants – decided to found a cultural association to promote their ideas. In the 1960s, de Benoist had contributed as a writer and journalist to develop Venner's thesis on European nationalism, which served as an ideological basis for GRECE. Their theory was founded on a 'pan-racial' rather than ethnic or civic conception of nationalism: the nation-states had to be dissolved for the peoples of the "Occident"—or the "white race"—to unite within a common European empire, on the grounds that they are the inheritors of a single civilization.

=== Creation and development: 1968–1977 ===
GRECE was founded in Nice, Provence in January 1968 by European – mostly French – nationalist activists, and officially launched on 17 January 1969. Among the 40 founders were Alain de Benoist, Dominique Venner, Giorgio Locchi, Maurice Rollet (who became its first president), Pierre Vial, and Jean-Claude Valla. (Note: The full list of the 40 founders, in alphabetical order, is: Pierre d'Arribère, Alain de Benoist, Pierre Bérard, Jean-Pierre Brosse, Jacques Bruyas, Daniel Butreau, Jean-Claude Carasco, Jacques Chessel, Vincent Decombis, Gérard Denestèbe, Jacques Douris, Yves Esquieu, Gilles Fournier, Alain Gary, Dominique Gajas, Claude Grandjean, Robert Lapeyre, Dominique Venner, Roger Lemoine, Giorgio Locchi, Antonio Lombardo, Alain Mallard, Pierre Marcenet, Jean-Jacques Mourreau, Michel Paysant, Jean-Yves Pequay, Yves Pondaven, Pierre-Henri Reboux, Jean-Claude Rivière, François Ruph, Maurice Rollet, Yves Rouxeville, Jean-Pierre Toni, Jean-Paul Touzalin, Jean-Claude Valla, Jacques Vassigny, Jacques Vernin, Roger Vétillard, Pierre Vial, Jean-Marcel Zagamé.) Their aim was to establish a meta-political "laboratory of ideas" that would influence mainstream right-wing parties and the French society at large. In May 1969, they circulated an internal document advising their members not to employ "outdated language" that might associate the group with fascism, and to socialize with Europe's most important decision-makers in order to influence their policies.

In 1969, Jean-Yves Le Gallou became a member of the Cercle Pareto, a students' club established in Sciences Po at the end of 1968 by Yvan Blot and closely linked to GRECE. They were joined by Guillaume Faye in 1970. GRECE launched its own review, Nouvelle École, in February–March 1968. Initially distributed exclusively among its members to hold debates in a semi-academic style, the review became public in 1969. From 1970 to 1982, Alain de Benoist worked has a journalist for the media outlets of Raymond Bourgine, Le Spectacle du Monde and Valeurs Actuelles. Until its heyday in the late 1970s, however, the group remained mostly unknown to the general public. Its members were focusing on the organization of conferences to influence the elites, with cercles de réflexion ("thinking groups") emerging in many cities of France and even abroad: the "Cercle Pareto" in Sciences Po Paris, "Galillée" in Lyon, "Critique Réaliste" in Nantes, "Jean Médecin" in Nice, "Bertrand Russel" in Toulon, "Pythéas" in Marseille, "Erwin-de-Steinbach" and "Wimpfeling" in Strasbourg, "Stamkunde" in Lilles, "Henry de Montherland" in Bordeaux, "Erasme" in Brussels, and "Villebois-Mareuil" in Johannesburg.

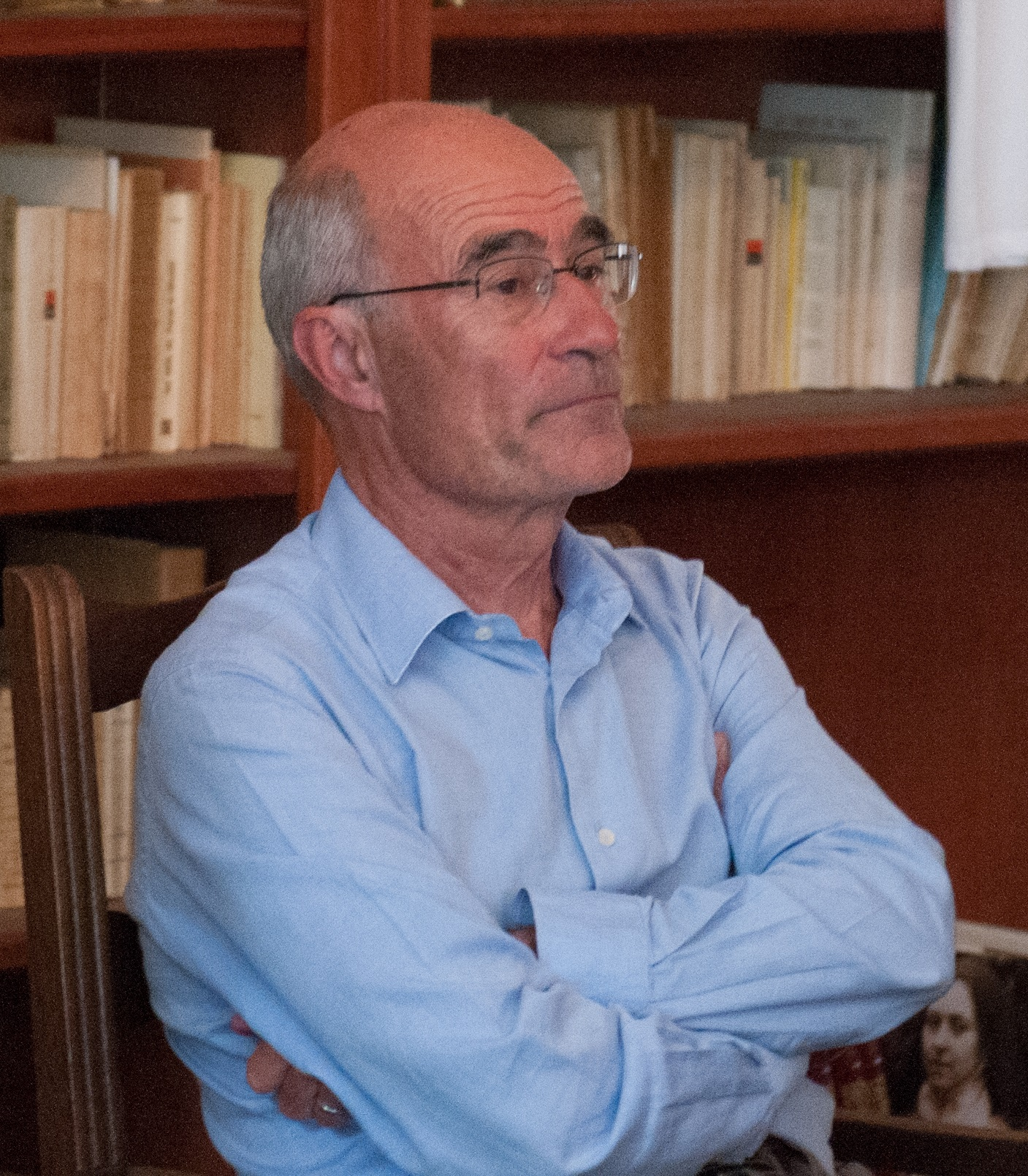
Jean-Yves Le Gallou in 2016.

In September 1973, the magazine Éléments, which had been serving as the internal bulletin of GRECE until then, began its public circulation as the general public showcase of the think tank. Frustrated with GRECE's long-term meta-political strategy, several members including Jean-Yves Le Gallou and Yvan Blot established with Henry de Lesquen a group named Club de l'Horloge in 1974 to serve as an elite think tank seeking to adopt a more direct strategy, "entryism", that is the infiltration of political parties and senior public offices. Several of them joined mainstream right-ring parties like the Rally for the Republic and the Union for French Democracy.

In one of its few direct metapolitical interventions, GRECE called for the election of centre-right candidate Valéry Giscard d'Estaing to the presidency in 1974. In 1975 and 1976, the organization created CLOSOR, a committee seeking to influence France's high-ranking military personnel, and GENE, intended for the teaching professionals. Each of them had its own special bulletin: Nation Armée and Nouvelle Éducation, respectively. In September 1976, GRECE founded the publishing company Copernic to propagate the Nouvelle Droite worldview to a larger European audience. The following year, it published de Benoist's essay Vu de droite ("See from right"), which was awarded the Prix de l'Essai of the prestigious Académie Française in 1978.

=== Growth and opposition: 1978–1993 ===
Building of the structure of influence they had established in the early 1970s – including reviews, conferences, publishing houses, and cercles –, GRECE members began to get public attention and influence from the late 1970s onward. After his nomination as the cultural director of Le Figaro in 1977, Louis Pauwels decided to found the weekly Figaro Magazine, recruiting many GRECE members to the project: Alain de Benoist, Patrice de Plunkett (chosen as the assistant chief editor), Jean-Claude Valla, Yves Christen, Christian Durante, Michel Marmin, Grégory Pons. Although they were not able to gain enough control to transform the Figaro Magazine into a real organ of propaganda, the ethno-nationalist think tank conserved a large influence on the magazine until 1981. According to political scientist Harvey Simmons, "from the early 1970s to the early 1980s, the doctrine of GRECE had a major impact on the ideology of the entire right" in France.

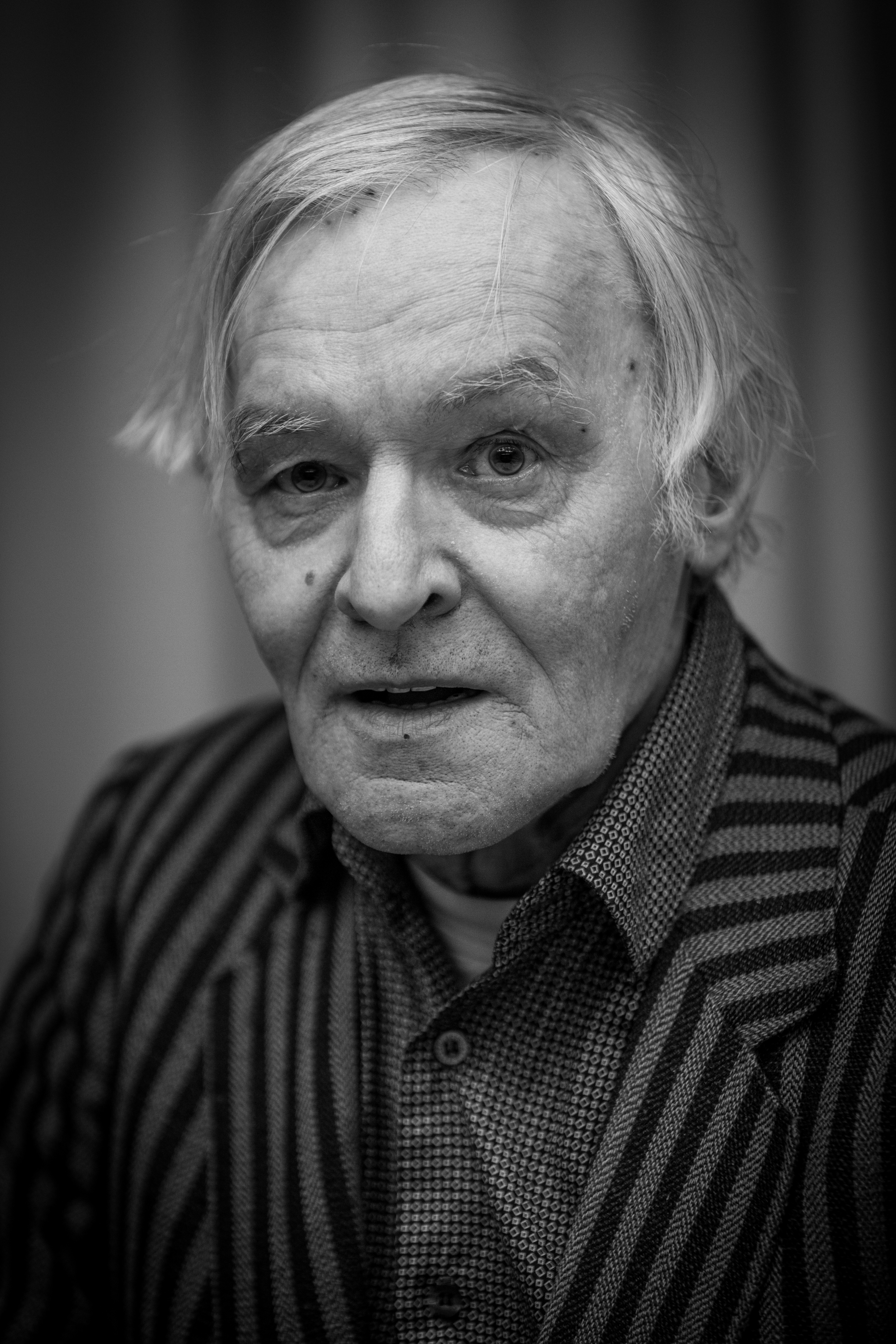
Guillaume Faye in 2015.

However, the growth of GRECE and the Nouvelle Droite was raising concerns in many liberal and leftist intellectual circles, which led to a violent media campaign against the Nouvelle Droite and Le Figaro in 1979, the year ending with a fight between the Jewish Defence Organization (OJD) and GRECE members in December. Pauwels began to distance himself from the movement and Le Figaro withdrew its patronage. From 1982 to 1992, de Benoist was confined to the redaction of the Figaro Magazine 'videos' section. Now deprived of a popular platform, the Nouvelle Droite accelerated away from biological racism and toward the concept of "ethnopluralism", that is the claim that different ethno-cultural groups should be kept separate in order to preserve their historical and cultural differences.

In 1980, Pierre Krebs established the Thule-Seminar to operate as a branch of GRECE in Germany. The same year, a group of scholars linked with GRECE, Jean Varenne, Jean Haudry and Jean-Paul Allard, founded the "Institute of Indo-European Studies" (IEIE) at the Jean Moulin University Lyon 3 in Lyon. In 1988 Pierre Vial obtained a teaching position at the same university, as did Bernard Notin and Jacques Marlaud, leading to the emergence of a GRECE "nucleus" exerting a certain influence in Lyon 3 during the 1980–1990s.

Le Gallou grew in importance and served as a link between GRECE ideas and Front National (FN) after he joined the FN in 1985. The party was influenced by GRECE's ideas and slogans, adopting the same emphasis on "ethno-cultural differentialism", although the Catholic faction in the FN rejected GRECE for their support of paganism. Since the years 1979–1980, however, the Club de l'Horloge has distanced itself from GRECE's anti-Christian, anti-American and anti-capitalist positions, promoting instead an "integral neo-Darwinist" philosophy characterized by a form of economic liberalism strongly tainted with ethnic nationalism. GRECE and European New Right activists have criticized the Club de l'Horloge for simultaneously promoting economic neoliberalism and cultural conservatism, which are in their views contradictory positions.

=== Recent developments: 1994–present ===
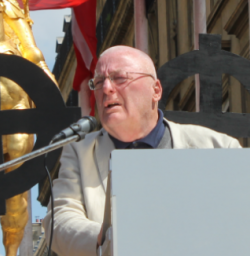
Pierre Vial in 2012.

In 1995 Pierre Vial, Jean Mabire and Jean Haudry co-founded the nativist movement Terre et Peuple. Guillaume Faye had temporarily left political activism in 1987 and worked for the hip-hop radio station Skyrock in the 1990s. He joined GRECE again in 1997 to introduce his concept of "archeofuturism". After the publication of his book The Colonization of Europe in 2000, which earned him a criminal conviction for incitement to racial hatred, he was expelled from GRECE at the request of de Benoist.

== Influence ==
Prominent personalities have collaborated with GRECE, notably via the membership to the patronage committee of its journal Nouvelle École, including Raymond Abellio, Franz Altheim, Maurice Bardèche, Anthony Burgess, Jean Cau, C. D. Darlington, Pierre Debray-Ritzen, Jacques de Mahieu, Mircea Eliade, Hans Eysenck, Julien Freund, Robert Gayre, Jean Haudry, Arthur Koestler, Manfred Mayrhofer, Edgar Polomé, Colin Renfrew, Marija Gimbutas, Marcel Le Glay, Konrad Lorenz, Thierry Maulnier, Armin Mohler, Louis Pauwels, Jean Parvulesco, Roger Pearson, Stefan Thomas Possony, or Louis Rougier.

Although the extent of the relationship is debated by scholars, GRECE and the Nouvelle Droite, and its German counterpart the Neue Rechte, have influenced the ideological and political structure of the European Identitarian Movement. Part of the alt-right also claims to have been inspired by De Benoist's writings.

The Institut Iliade (lit. 'Iliad Institute'), co-founded in 2014 by Le Gallou, has been described by Le Monde as "the heir of GRECE".

== Themes and ideas ==
The think tank initially borrowed several themes already present in Europe-Action : anti-Christianity and elitism, a pan-racial notion of European nationalism, and the seeds of a change from a biological to a cultural definition of alterity. Between 1962 and 1972, the core members of what would be GRECE embraced a Europeanism, which according to Taguieff and Griffin, was "still in the key of biological Aryanism associated with the overtly neo-Nazi 'Message of Uppsala' and the publication of Europe-Action." Between 1972 and 1987, under the influence of Armin Mohler and the Conservative Revolution, this discourse was progressively replaced with a cultural approach of alterity based upon a Nietzschean rejection of egalitarianism and a call for a European palingenesis (heroic rebirth) via a return to the ancestral "Indo-European values". A third ideological phase, from 1984 to 1987, shifted towards third-worldism, the revival of the sacred, and ethnopluralism.

=== Ethnopluralism ===
The group exhibits a hostility to multicultural societies, viewed as a form of "ethnocide", and emphasizes the rights of groups over individuals. GRECE is against both immigration and "remigration", favouring instead the separation of the different ethnic and cultural groups within France. Significant foreign cultural elements inside a group ought to be culturally assimilated in a process of cultural homogenization.

Although it opposes liberal democracy, GRECE is not inherently anti-democratic and calls for localized form of what it calls "organic democracy".

=== Metapolitics ===
Influenced by Marxist thinker Antonio Gramsci, GRECE aims at slowly infusing society with its ideas in the hope of achieving cultural hegemony, sometimes called "right-wing Gramscism". Metapolitics is defined by Guillaume Faye as the "social diffusion of ideas and cultural values for the sake of provoking profound, long-term, political transformation", and by former GRECE president Jacques Marlaud as "any work of reflection or analysis, any diffusion of ideas, any cultural practice liable to influence political society over the long term. It is no longer a matter of taking power but of providing those in power with ideological, philosophical, and cultural nourishment that can shape (or contradict) their decisions."

In 1974, GRECE members Jean Mabire, Maurice Rollet, Jean-Claude Valla and Pierre Vial founded the scouting organization Europe-Jeunesse to diffuse Nouvelle Droite ideas and values to the youth.

=== Archeofuturism ===
Archeofuturism is a concept invented by Guillaume Faye in 1998 and defined as the reconciliation of technology and sciences with "archaic values". Faye described archeofuturism as a "vitalist constructionism" (N.B. this is a completely different contextual usage meaning of 'Vitalist/ Vitalism' than the antiquated and disproved biological theory Vitalism; it refers rather to a fascist myth or metaphor of the body politic as like a living body, with a sole head, the Duce, El Caudillo or Fuhrer) and stated that "archaic" should be understood in the Ancient Greek meaning of the word archè, i.e. "the beginning" or "the foundation".

== Notable members ==
Among the prominent figures of the European New Right who became members of GRECE were:

- Alain de Benoist (1968–present), co-founder.
- Pierre Vial (1968–1986), co-founder, second director of Éléments.
- Giorgio Locchi (1968–?), co-founder.
- Maurice Rollet (1968–?), co-founder.
- Jean-Claude Valla (1968–1986), co-founder.
- Dominique Venner (1968–1971).
- Yvan Blot (1968–1974), founder of the Cercle Pareto, founding member of the Carrefour de l'Horloge.
- Jean-Yves Le Gallou (1969–1974), founding member of the Carrefour de l'Horloge.
- Jean Mabire (1970–?), member of the "federal council" and "commission of traditions".
- Guillaume Faye (1970–1987; 1997–2000).
- Michel Marmin, first director of Éléments.
- Jean Varenne (1974–1986).
- Jacques Marlaud.

== Organization ==
President:

- 1968–1974: Maurice Rollet.
- 1974–1984: Roger Lemoine.
- 1984–1986: Jean Varenne.
- 1987–1991: Jacques Marlaud.
- 1991–1992: Michel Marmin.
- 1992–2013: Jean-Claude Jacquard.
- 2013–present: Michel Thibault.

Secretary general:

- 1968–1974: Alain de Benoist.
- 1974–1978: Jean-Claude Valla.
- 1978–1984: Pierre Vial.
- 1984–1986: Jean-Claude Cariou.
- 1986–1991: Gilbert Sincyr.
- 1990–????:Xavier Marchand

== Publications ==
GRECE edits two journals, Éléments and Nouvelle École. William H. Tucker and Bruce Lincoln have described Nouvelle École as the "French version of the Mankind Quarterly", and historian James G. Shields as the equivalent of the German Neue Anthropologie.

== See also ==
- Carrefour de l'Horloge
