= Jean Haudry =

French linguist and Indo-Europeanist (1934–2023)

- Born: 28 May 1934; Le Perreux-sur-Marne, France
- Died: 23 May 2023 (aged 88)
- Occupations: Indologist; Indo-Europeanist

Jean Haudry (28 May 1934 – 23 May 2023) was a French linguist and Indo-Europeanist who specialised in Sanskrit, Vedic studies, and comparative Indo-European grammar. A professor at the University of Lyon and director of studies at the École pratique des hautes études, he founded the Institut d’études indo-européennes ('Institute of Indo-European Studies') and published extensively on Indo-European mythology and cosmology, notably proposing the three-sky model, which is often mentioned in handbooks of Indo-European studies.

Haudry was generally regarded as a distinguished linguist by his peers, even as his close involvement in far-right political and intellectual movements attracted sustained criticism, and some of his theories have been linked to those ideological contexts. Haudry's L'Indo-Européen, published in 1979, remains the reference introduction to the Proto-Indo-European language written in French.

== Biography ==
Jean Haudry was born on 28 May 1934 in Le Perreux-sur-Marne in the eastern suburbs of Paris. Haudry entered the École normale supérieure in 1956 and obtained the agrégation of grammar in 1959, ranking first. After completing his military service, he held early university posts as assistant in Latin and linguistics in Montpellier and Paris. In 1966 he joined the Faculty of Letters at the University of Lyon, first as chargé d’enseignement (later maître-assistant), and from 1976 as professor of Sanskrit and comparative Indo-European grammar until his retirement in 1998.

From 1976 to 1998, Haudry also served as director of studies (directeur d’études cumulant) at the École pratique des hautes études (EPHE), where he held the chair of “Comparative Grammar of Indo-European Languages", succeeding his teacher Armand Minard. In 1982 he founded the Institut d’études indo-européennes at the University of Lyon, which published the periodical Études indo-européennes and organised annual seminars. His doctoral thesis, L’emploi des cas en védique, was supervised by Armand Minard, defended in 1975 at the Sorbonne Nouvelle (Paris III), and published in Lyon in 1977.

Haudry taught for more than two decades at the EPHE, offering courses and seminars on Vedic hymns, comparative grammar, phonology, Indo-European morphology, Hittite, and Germanic. He retired from his EPHE post in 1998.

Haudry died on 23 May 2023 in Pont-de-Veyle, five days before his 89th birthday, after a long illness.

== Political positions ==
Haudry was a member of the Institute of Formation of the Front National (FN) of Jean-Marie Le Pen. He also served in the Scientific Council of the FN until the late 1990s, when he decided to follow Bruno Mégret and his splinter party Mouvement National Républicain.

In 1980, he co-founded with GRECE members Jean-Paul Allard and Jean Varenne the "Institute of Indo-European Studies" (IEIE) at the Jean Moulin University Lyon 3. Under his leadership between 1982 and 1998, the IEIE published the journal Études indo-européennes. He was a professor of Sanskrit and dean of the faculty of letters at the University Lyon 3 and a directeur d'études at the 4th section of the École Pratique des Hautes Études. He became professor emeritus in 2002.

Haudry practiced a version of modern paganism that put heavy emphasis on ethnicity. He described this paganism: "each [pagan] religion belongs specifically to the corresponding ethnic and linguistic community, which, far from seeking to convert foreigners, jealously guards the benefits of its religion for its members". In 1995, he participated in the founding of the nativist movement Terre et Peuple, along with Pierre Vial and Jean Mabire, and served as its vice president.

Soon after Haudry's retirement, the French Ministry of Education appointed a commission to investigate whether Haudry's institute was too closely associated with the far-right. The work of the commission was mooted when Haudry's successor, Jean-Paul Allard, dissolved the institute and reconstituted it as an association free from state supervision.

He was a director of the Association of French Friends of South African Communities.

== Scholarship ==
=== Que sais-je ? controversy ===
Haudry gained wider recognition in France beyond specialist linguistics with the publication of his Que sais-je ? volume Les Indo-Européens (1981). While the book filled a gap in French scholarship and drew on the work of Émile Benveniste and Georges Dumézil, it was criticised for promoting essentialist views of the Indo-Europeans. In particular, Chapter VII advances unsupported claims about a circumpolar homeland and ethnic type, relying uncritically on authors from early-20th-century German völkisch and racialist circles. According to Georges-Jean Pinault, Les Indo-Européens marked a turning point in Haudry's work; in later publications he continued to defend or rework his Nordicist and neo-pagan theses.

=== Three-sky model ===
In his most important work on comparative mythology, La Religion cosmique des Indo-Européens (1987; "The Cosmic Religion of Indo-Europeans"), Haudry argued that Proto-Indo-European cosmology featured three 'skies' (diurnal, nocturnal and liminal) each having its own set of deities and colours (white, red, and dark). The proposition is often mentioned in handbooks of Indo-European studies, although it has been criticised by some scholars as an "overinterpretation" of available data.

Three-sky cosmological model proposed by J. Haudry
Realm	Theme	Deities	Colour
Day	Celestial	"Daylight-sky god" (*Dyēus)	white
Dawn/twilight	Bridging	"Binder-god" (Kronos, Savitṛ, Saturnus)	red
Night	Night Spirits	"Night-sky god" (Ouranos)	dark

=== Thought, word, action ===
In Haudry's 2009 essay entitled The Triad: thought, word, action, in the Indo-European tradition, he stated that the formula "thought, word, action" had a wide distribution in all of the ancient literatures of Indo-European languages in antiquity.

According to Haudry, there is a connection between the triad of "thought, word, action" and fire or light. He said that the presence of "divine fires" is in several Indo-European mythologies, such as the figure of Loki in Norse mythology.

For Alberto De Antoni, this study, which is "very scholarly and elaborate from a linguistic point of view, with an extensive bibliography and a critical apparatus", allows Haudry, thanks to the multiplicity of sources within the Indo-European world and due to Haudry's "excellent linguistic expertise" to reconstitute the verbs and nouns of the triadic formula.

=== Arctic hypothesis ===
Haudry supported the Arctic hypothesis of the origin of Indo-Europeans. However, he believed that the Kurgan culture was probably home to a later stage of the language, and its center of diffusion of Indo-European languages.

Martin L. West has argued that locating the Indo-Europeans in the Arctic, an idea first proposed by Bal Gangadhar Tilak in 1903 and based on mythological and calendrical interpretations, is untenable, as habitation at such latitudes is incompatible with the pastoral and agricultural way of life presupposed by common Indo-European vocabulary, and disregards standard arguments from flora and fauna. Haudry's position was also criticised by Bernard Sergent, who argued that his Arctic hypothesis reflects a modern ideological myth rooted in far-right intellectual circles rather than a historically grounded reconstruction.

== Works ==
- L'Emploi des cas en védique: introduction à l'étude des cas en indo-européen. Éditions l'Hermès. 1977. ISBN 978-2-85934-018-6.
- L'indo-européen. Presses universitaires de France. 1979. ISBN 978-2-13-038370-3.
- Les Indo-Européens. Presses universitaires de France. 1981. ISBN 978-2-13-038371-0.
- Prehistoire de la flexion nominale indo-européenne. Institut d'études indo-européennes de l'Université Jean Moulin. 1982.
- La religion cosmique des Indo-Européens. Archè. 1987. ISBN 978-2-251-35352-4.
- Juno Moneta: aux sources de la monnaie. Études indo-européennes. Archè. 2002. ISBN 978-88-7252-224-0.
- La triade pensée, parole, action dans la tradition indo-européenne. Archè. 2009. ISBN 978-88-7252-295-0.
- Le feu dans la tradition indo-européenne. Archè. 2017. ISBN 978-88-7252-343-8.
- Sur les pas des Indo-Européens: religion, mythologie, linguistique. Yoran Embanner. 2022. ISBN 978-2-36747-091-7.
- Lexique de la tradition indo-européenne. Yoran Embanner. 2023. ISBN 978-2-36747-098-6.
