= Jean-Claude Valla =

French journalist and essayist (1944–2010)

- Born: 16 May 1944; Roanne, Loire
- Died: 25 February 2010 (aged 65); Arthez-d'Asson, Nouvelle-Aquitaine
- Occupation: Journalist

Jean-Claude Valla (16 May 1944 – 25 February 2010) was a French journalist and a prominent figure of the Nouvelle Droite.

== Biography ==
=== Early life ===
Jean-Claude Valla was born on 16 May 1944 in Roanne, Loire. Between 1962 and 1965, he was the leader the Federation of Nationalist Students (FEN) branch in Lyon, serving also in two redaction committees: in the FEN magazine Cahiers Universitaires, and in Europe-Action, a white nationalist review founded in 1963 by Dominique Venner.

=== GRECE ===
Valla was a founding member of GRECE, an ethno-nationalist think tank set up in January 1968. He also participated in the founding of the scouting organization Europe-Jeunesse in 1973. After the launch of GRECE magazine Éléments in September 1973, Valla became its redactor-in-chief.

Between 1974 and 1978, he also served as the secretary general of GRECE. Valla supported the pseudoscientific thesis of the colonization of Peru by the Vikings in his book La Civilisation des Incas, published in 1976. He worked as a managing director at the Figaro Magazine until 1979, before leaving GRECE in 1986.

=== Later life and death ===
In the 1990s, he was appointed editorial director of the far-right weekly newspaper Minute. Responding to an article by Georges Charbonneau published in GRECE bulletin and declaring that the organization did not support Holocaust deniers, Valla wrote in 1991 that he denied GRECE's legitimacy to speak for all the Nouvelle Droite movement. Valla also stood up for Holocaust denier Robert Faurisson in an issue of Figaro-Magazine, and for the editor of negationist thesis Jean Plantin in the Nouvelle Droite magazine Éléments in 2002.

He died on 25 February 2010 in Arthez-d'Asson, Nouvelle-Aquitaine, at the age of 65.

== Works ==
- La Civilisation des Incas. Famot, 1976.
- Les Seigneurs de la guerre (with Dominique Venner, André Brissaud and Jean Mabire). Famot, 1978.
- Les Grandes découvertes archéologiques du XX^{e} siècle. Famot, 1979.
- Affaire Touvier : la contre-enquête. Ed. du Camelot, 1996.
- La Cagoule : 1936-1937,. Ed. de la Librairie Nationale, 2000.
- La France sous les bombes américaines : 1942-1945. Ed. de la Librairie nationale, 2001.
- L'Extrême droite dans la Résistance, 2 vol.. Ed. de la Librairie nationale, 2000.
- La Gauche pétainiste. Ed. de la Librairie nationale, 2001.
- Le Pacte germano-sioniste, 7 août 1933. Ed. de la Librairie nationale, 2001.
- Ces Juifs de France qui ont collaboré. Ed. de la Librairie nationale, 2002.
- La Milice : Lyon, 1943-1944. Ed. de la Librairie nationale, 2002.
- Ledesma Ramos et la Phalange espagnole : 1931-1936. Ed. de la Librairie nationale, 2002.
- Georges Valois : de l'anarcho-syndicalisme au fascisme. Ed. de la Librairie nationale, 2003.
- La Nostalgie de l'Empire : une relecture de l'histoire napoléonienne. Ed. de la Librairie nationale, 2004.
- Les Socialistes dans la Collaboration : de Jaurès à Hitler. Ed. de la Librairie nationale, 2006.
- Doriot. Pardès, 2008.
