= Nouvelle École =

French annual political and philosophy magazine

- Editor-in-chief: Eric Maulin
- Categories: Political magazine; Philosophy magazine
- Frequency: Annual
- Founder: GRECE
- Founded: 1968
- First issue: 11 March 1968
- Country: France
- Based in: Paris
- Language: French
- Website: https://www.revue-elements.com/categorie-produit/revues/nouvelle-ecole/
- ISSN: 0048-0967
- OCLC: 2418634

Nouvelle École (French: New School) is an annual political and philosophy magazine which was established in Paris, France, in 1968 by an ethno-nationalist think tank, GRECE. The magazine is one of the significant media outlets of the Nouvelle Droite (New Right) political approach in France. The director of Nouvelle École, Alain de Benoist, said that the start of the magazine "indicates in some way the birth of the New Right".

== History and profile ==
Nouvelle École's first issue appeared on 11 March 1968. As of 2023 the magazine's director is Alain de Benoist, and its editor-in-chief is Eric Maulin.

William H. Tucker and Bruce Lincoln described Nouvelle École as the "French version of the Mankind Quarterly", a scientific-racist journal published in Northern Ireland. Historian James G. Shields described it as the equivalent of the German scientific-racist journal Neue Anthropologie.

According to its sister magazine Éléments, Nouvelle École includes topics including archeology, biology, sociology, literature, philosophy and history of religions.

== See also ==
- Metapolitics
