= Jean Mabire =

French writer, journalist and literary critic

- Born: 8 February 1927; Paris, Île-de-France
- Died: 29 March 2006 (aged 79); Saint-Malo, Brittany
- Occupation: Journalist

Jean Mabire (8 February 1927—29 March 2006) was a French journalist and essayist, author of over a hundred published works. A neo-pagan and nordicist, Mabire is known for the regionalist and euronationalist ideas that he developed in both Europe-Action and GRECE, as well as his controversial books on the Waffen-SS.

== Biography ==
=== Early life ===
Jean Pol Yves Jacques Mabire was born in Paris on 8 February 1927, to a bourgeois family originally from Vire, Normandy. He attended the Collège Stanislas, where he earned a baccalauréat in literature and philosophy.

In 1949, at the age of 22, Mabire created the regionalist magazine Viking and in 1951 left Paris to settle in Cherbourg, Normandy, where he founded a graphic arts workshop. Mabire wrote the majority of the 162 articles published by the magazine until its end in 1958. Viking had 300 to 400 subscribers and the most popular issues sold around 1,000 copies. He regarded the Normans as part of the "Nordic race" and his magazine gave a great importance to Scandinavian cultures and Viking history.

=== Political and religious activism ===
In 1958, Mabire was sent as a reserved soldier to North Africa during the Algerian War (1954–62) and demobilized in October 1959 as a Reserve Captain. Between 1963 and 1965, he wrote articles in Philippe Héduy's L'Esprit public, and was a contributor in Cahiers universitaires, the magazine of the Federation of Nationalist Students (FEN). In 1965, he was part of the grassroots committees of far-right presidential candidate Jean-Louis Tixier-Vignancour, and wrote in January a book to explain his endorsement.

From 1965, he served as the redactor-in-chief of Europe-Action, in which he wrote about neo-paganism, the Waffen SS and the Charlemagne Division. Mabire was one of the architects of the euro-nationalist break with the old French nationalism supported by the magazine. He supported instead a pan-European nationalism, decentralized and based on the identities of regions, seen as smaller ethnic nations, a thesis later embodied in Yann Fouéré's "Europe of 100 Flags", published in 1968. His shift towards the radical right was confirmed in many articles Mabire published in Le Spectacle du Monde, Valeurs Actuelles or Minute.

He was one of the founders, in 1968, of the Union for the Norman Region (URN), along with Gaullist deputy Pierre Godefroy and student activist Didier Patte. The same year, Mabire became a founding member of the Mouvement Normand, and the following year he helped Georges Bernage establish Heimdal, a regionalist magazine and intellectual successor of Viking. Mabire wrote in Heimdal about Norman poets, Nordicism and Scandinavian mythology. The magazine was a success and sold at more than 3,000 copies. He became an active member of GRECE in 1970, and took part in its "federal council" and "commission of traditions".

In 1973, Mabire co-founded the neopagan scouting organization Europe-Jeunesse with Jean-Claude Valla and Maurice Rollet. The same year, Mabire's literary career began with the publication of a saga on the history of the French SS: La Brigade Frankreich, La Division Charlemagne and Mourir à Berlin. He participated, along with other GRECE members Pierre Vial and Jean Haudry, in the founding of the association Terre et Peuple in 1995.

=== Books on the Waffen-SS ===
His books on the Waffen-SS have been regarded as a hagyographic and romantic rehabilitation of Nazism. Mabire describes for instance some units in those terms: "The SS carry the Prometheus torch and Sigurd's sword to the Caucasus. They are the sons of the old Germanic warriors who emerged from the ice and forests. They are the Teutonics who replaced the cross of Christ with the wheel of the Sun. They are Adolf Hitler's SS."

=== Later life and death ===
After his wife's death from cancer in 1974, he married Katherine Hentic in 1976, with whom he had three children. He moved in 1982 to Saint-Malo (Ille-et-Vilaine), in the Saint-Servan quarter. Jean Mabire died of leukemia on 29 March 2006 in Saint-Malo, Brittany, at the age of 79.

== Works ==
On History

- Les Hors-la-loi. Robert Laffont, 1968; re-edited as Commando de chasse
- Les Samouraï, with Yves Bréhéret. Paris, Balland, 1971
- Les Waffen SS, under the pseudonym "Henri Landemer". Balland, 1972
- La Brigade Frankreich. Fayard, 1973
- Ungern, le Baron fou. Balland, 1973; corrected re-edition as Ungern, le dieu de la guerre and Ungern, l'héritier blanc de Genghis Khan
- La Division Charlemagne. Fayard, 1974
- Mourir à Berlin, Paris. Fayard, 1975
- Les Jeunes Fauves du Führer. La division SS Hitlerjugend en Normandie. Fayard, 1976
- L'Été rouge de Pékin. Fayard, 1978
- Les Panzers de la Garde Noire. Presse de la Cité, 1978
- La Division « Wiking ». Fayard, 1980
- Les Paras du matin rouge. Presses de la Cité, 1981
- La Crète, tombeau des paras Allemands. Presses de la Cité, 1982
- Chasseurs alpins. Des Vosges aux Djebels. Presses de la Cité, 1984; Écrivains Combattants prize
- Les Paras perdus. Presses de la Cité, 1987.
- Les Diables verts de Cassino. Presses de la Cité, 1991.
- Les Paras de l'enfer blanc, Front de l'Est 1941-1945. Presses de la Cité, 1995
- Division de choc Wallonie, Lutte à mort en Poméranie. Éditions Jacques Grancher, 1996
- Les Guerriers de la plus grande Asie. Dualpha, 2004

On paganism

- Thulé, le soleil retrouvé des Hyperboréens. Paris, Robert Laffont, 1978.
- Les Solstices. Histoire et Actualité, with Pierre Vial. GRECE, 1975
- Les Dieux maudits. Copernic, 1978; re-edited as Légendes de la mythologie nordique
- Balades au cœur de l'Europe païenne (collective work). Les Éditions de la forêt, 2002.

On Normandy

- Histoire de la Normandie, en collaboration avec Jean-Robert Ragache (Hachette, 1976; réédition : France-Empire, 1986, 1992) : awarded by the Mouvement Normand
- Les Vikings, rois des tempêtes, with Pierre Vial. Versoix, 1976; re-edited as Les Vikings à travers le monde
- La Saga de Godefroy Le Boiteux. Copernic, 1980; re-edited as Godefroy de Harcourt, seigneur normand
- Histoire secrète de la Normandie. Albin Michel, 1984
- Guillaume le Conquérant. Art et Histoire d'Europe, 1987
- Les Ducs de Normandie. Lavauzelle, 1987
- Grands Marins normands. L'Ancre de Marine, 1993
- Légendes traditionnelles de Normandie. L'Ancre de Marine, 1997
- Jean Mabire et le Mouvement Normand. Éditions de l'Esnesque, 1998
- Vikings : cahiers de la jeunesse des pays normands. Veilleur, 1999
- La Varende entre nous. Présence de La Varende, 1999
- Des poètes normands et de l'héritage nordique. Antée, 2003
