= European Rally for Liberty =

French political party

European Rally for Liberty Rassemblement Européen pour la Liberté
- Abbreviation: REL
- President: Dominique Venner (1966–67); Pierre Bousquet (1967–68)
- Founder: Dominique Venner and others
- Founded: November 1966
- Dissolved: 1969
- Preceded by: Mouvement Nationaliste du Progrès
- Newspaper: Europe-Action
- Ideology: Euronationalism; White nationalism
- Political position: Far-right

The European Rally for Liberty (French: Rassemblement Européen pour la Liberté, REL), also translated as European Assembly for Liberty, was a short-lived far-right, euro-nationalist party active in France between 1966 and 1968. It was the political showcase of the Nationalist Movement of Progress (Mouvement Nationaliste du Progrès, MNP), created nine months earlier. The movement and the party were founded by the euro-nationalist magazine Europe-Action, escorted by militants from the Federation of Nationalist Students.

== History ==
=== Background ===
The political movement was initially founded in January 1966 as the "Nationalist Movement of Progress" (Mouvement Nationaliste du Progrès, MNP) by head members of the nationalist magazine Europe-Action, escorted by leaders of the Federation of Nationalist Students and elements from the Tixier-Vignancour Committees. Many of them, especially Dominique Venner, had been deceived by the electoral failure (5.2%) of far-right candidate Jean-Louis Tixier-Vignancour in the 1965 presidential election.

The first congress was held on 30 April and 1 May 1966, for the movement to reclaim this date, until then "reserved to [their] communist adversaries" in their views. Dominique Venner introduced the agenda of the movement behind a crowd of 300 delegates: the "defence of the Occidental civilization", which was facing three perceived dangers: "the work of falsification", set up by the elites to make the people forget its own identity and history; the "power of technology", accused of uniforming the planet; and the "demographic tide of the coloured world", which would lead to a "universal brewing" and the "disappearance of [Europeans] genetic specificity, the end of the white world and its civilization". The aim of MNP leaders was therefore to make white people realize this "state of full submission", and persuade them to "fight" and "refuse this death". The white minority government of the breakaway country Rhodesia sent a Rhodesian flag which was prominently displayed throughout the conference.

=== 1967 legislative elections ===
The political party "European Rally for Liberty" (REL) was launched in November 1966 to serve as a political showcase for the MNP for the forthcoming elections, Venner asserting that they would benefit from the campaign to promote their view on the public radio and television. Europe-Action had a weekly publication, Europe-Action hebdomadaire, which served as an organ for the party and where the main essayists of the magazine—Dominique Venner, Jean Mabire, Alain de Benoist, François d'Orcival—wrote political articles during the campaign. The party was however only able to run 27 contenders in the legislative election of March 1967 and fared poorly in the results, receiving 2.5% of the national votes with no elected candidate.

=== Dissolution ===
Following this failure, Venner left the leadership and the REL was reorganized under the iron rule of Pierre Bousquet and Pierre Clémenti, two former members of the Waffen-SS. This takeover, along with the relations maintained with the German neo-Nazi NPD and seminars held on Mein Kampf, triggered a wave of resignations. In March 1968, an extraordinary session of the REL's nation council excluded Bousquet and Venner from the movement. The party was only able to run one candidate, Édith Gérard, in the subsequent legislative election of June 1968.

Despite the few illusions shown by REL members before the vote—Venner declared to Rivarol before the election that "[their] aim should not be to have deputies elected, but to get [themselves] known, to impose [their] existence"—, the electoral debacle of the party confirmed the theories developed by Venner and de Benoist in 1962–1965 about the need to achieve cultural dominance before gaining the popular vote. The REL eventually disappeared in 1969 after a financial scandal.

== Legacy ==
The electoral debacles of the European Rally for Liberty, along with the previous failure of Tixier-Vignancourt, are cited as conducive to the foundation of the ethno-nationalist think tank GRECE and the development of its meta-political strategy. Alain de Benoist, a member of the national council of the REL, founded the think tank in 1968, along with other adherents of the party and former members of the Federation of Nationalist Students.

Another group, led by Pierre Bousquet and Jean Castrillo, created the nationalist magazine Militant in December 1967, then entered the Front National (FN) in 1973 where they represented the more radical fringe of the party. They broke with the FN in 1979 due its supposed "conservative and Zionist stance". REL's security personnel joined Occident in October 1967. Other members chose to support far-left parties during the May 1968 events.

The MNP was suspected of receiving financial aids from the governments of Rhodesia, South Africa, Spain and Portugal. Despite the claimed 300,000 members, the estimated membership was no more than 2,500. The REL participated in accustoming the far right to contesting elections in the Fifth Republic. Following the successive routs of the Vichy state, poujadism, and the OAS in bringing down the republic, Dominique Venner indeed recognized in January 1967 that the far right "[had to] take part in the only great political battles of the moment: elections."

== Views ==
The party was anti-communist, anti-immigration and defended pan-European nationalism. The REL's program included "state control over the banks", a "national convention formed outside established parties to define fundamental laws", the "removal of all aids for developing countries", an "end to North African immigration and ‘the expulsion of elements that pose a danger to public safety and health", "resist American or Soviet hegemony and stem the demographic tide from the Third World, and a "politically unified Europe, with respect for national traditions."

When compared to definitions and terminologies given by its theorists in the 1960s, the "defense of the Occident" agenda must be understood as a "defense of the white race". The REL, like Europe-Action, also disguised racialism under "biological realism". The REL's unique candidate in the 1968 legislative election, Édith Gérard, advocated for instance the "friendship among peoples of the world, in the recognition of the biological fact and the right to stay faithful to one's ethnic group and traditions."

== See also ==
- Europe-Action and the Federation of Nationalist Students; creators of the party
- GRECE, Militant and Occident; main organizations joined by REL members after its dissolution
