= Jean-Pierre Stirbois =

French politician (1945–1988)

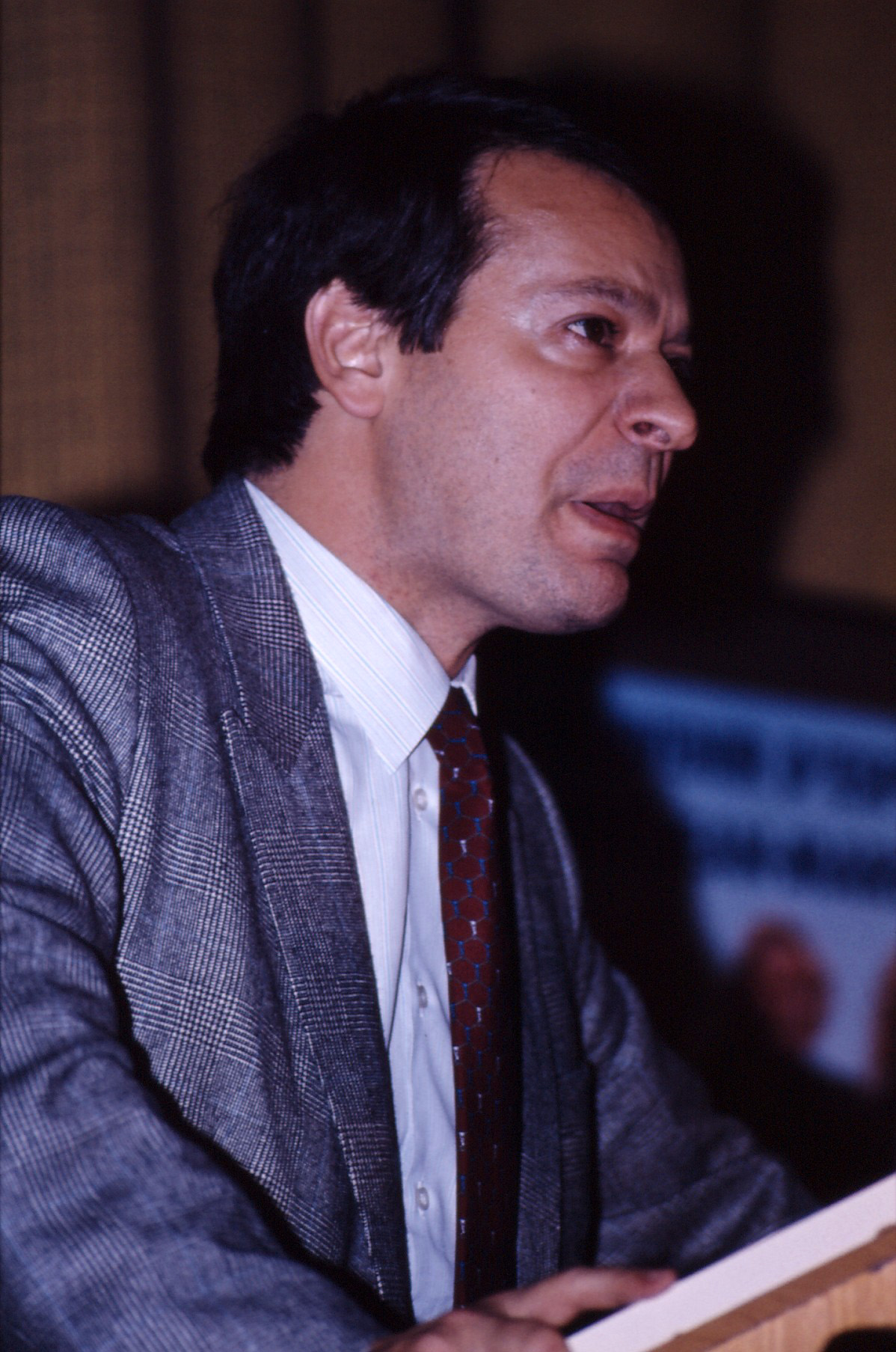
- Jean-Pierre Stirbois in 1984

Member of the National Assembly for Hauts-de-Seine
- In office 1986–1988

Personal details
- Born: 30 January 1945 Paris, France
- Died: 5 November 1988 (aged 43) Jouars-Pontchartrain, France
- Party: National Front
- Spouse: Marie-France Stirbois
- Education: Panthéon-Assas University

Jean-Pierre Stirbois (French pronunciation: [ʒɑ̃ pjɛʁ stiʁbwa]; 30 January 1945 – 5 November 1988) was a French far-right politician. Elected deputy mayor in 1983 of Dreux, a city of around 30,000 inhabitants at the time, he was one of the main architects, along with his wife Marie-France Stirbois, of the first electoral breakthrough of the National Front.

== Biography ==
=== Early life and activism (1945–1976) ===
Born on 30 January 1945 in Paris, Jean-Pierre Stirbois came from a working-class family. As a teenager, he became close to the pro-colonial paramilitary organization OAS-Métro-Jeunes.

Stirbois attended the University Panthéon-Assas. Aged 19 in 1964, he decided to get involved in politics, influenced by the outcomes of the Algerian War (1954–1962). Stirbois then joined the far-right militant group Occident and became the head of the youth wing in the national council of the Tixier-Vignancour committees during the 1965 presidential campaign.

One of the creators of Jeune Alliance, he co-founded in 1965 the organization Mouvement Jeune Révolution (MJR). In 1969 he was nominated secretary general of the movement, and he established in 1975 the Solidarist Union ("Union solidariste") to replace the MJR. Close to Aginter Press, he was condemned to a suspended one-year jail sentence after the discovery of arms and equipment for the production of explosives in his basement.

=== Member of the FN (1977–1988) ===
In 1977, Sirtois and his movement joined the Front National (FN). Following the death of François Duprat the following year, he became the right-hand man of FN founding leader Jean-Marie Le Pen. Part of the solidarist wing of the party and a pro-Zionist, Stirbois opposed the neo-fascist factions in the FN who accused him of secretly being a Jew. Stirbois dismissed them as "cheap Nazis" ("nazillons") and eventually managed to oust them from the party leadership. He supported at the same time an aggressive anti-immigrant political position, coining the expression "on les renverra" ("we will make them leave") in an interview.

In 1981 Stirbois became secretary-general of the FN. A candidate in the 1983 municipal election in Dreux (Eure-et-Loir), he managed to obtain nearly 17% of the votes in the first round, promising to "invert the migratory flows". During the second round, the local mainstream right-wing parties Rally for the Republic (RPR) and Union for French Democracy (UDF) agreed to form an alliance with the FN. Together they won the second round with 55% of the vote and Stirbois became deputy mayor of the city. Commonly called the "thunderclap of Dreux", the event was the first electoral breakthrough of the FN and is regarded as a cornerstone of the rise of the party.

Stirbois was elected MEP in the 1984 European election as a FN candidate. In 1986, the introduction of proportional representation allowed him to enter the National Assembly as a deputy for the Hauts-de-Seine. The rise of Stirbois led him to become a rival of Bruno Mégret and Carl Lang in the party.

Labeling himself a "national-populist", the FN developed under his influence a strategy to attract left-wing voters: "those who traditionally vote left because they have always believed the left defends workers will gradually realize that the movement which best defends workers is the Front National." Between 1984 and 1986, the share of FN working class voters rose from 8 to 19%.

=== Death ===
Following the defeat of Le Pen in the 1988 presidential election, he tried to convince the FN to call for a vote for Socialist candidate François Mitterrand. Stirbois then participated in the "no" campaign for the referendum in New Caledonia. After having threatened France of a new OAS in a meeting in Dreux, claiming to be ready to "donate his skin in order to achieve his ideas" ("mettre sa peau au bout de ses idées"), Stirbois died in a car crash on 5 November 1988.

4,000 persons attended his funeral, including Yvan Blot, Henry de Lesquen, Jean-Gilles Malliarakis, Pierre Pujo, Pierre Sidos, and Jean-Marie Le Pen, who delivered the eulogy.

== Works ==
- Dossier immigration (with Jean-François Jalkh), National-Hebdo, 1985.
- Tonnerre de Dreux, l'avenir nous appartient, National-Hebdo, 1988.
