= Jean-Louis Tixier-Vignancour =

French right-wing politician and lawyer

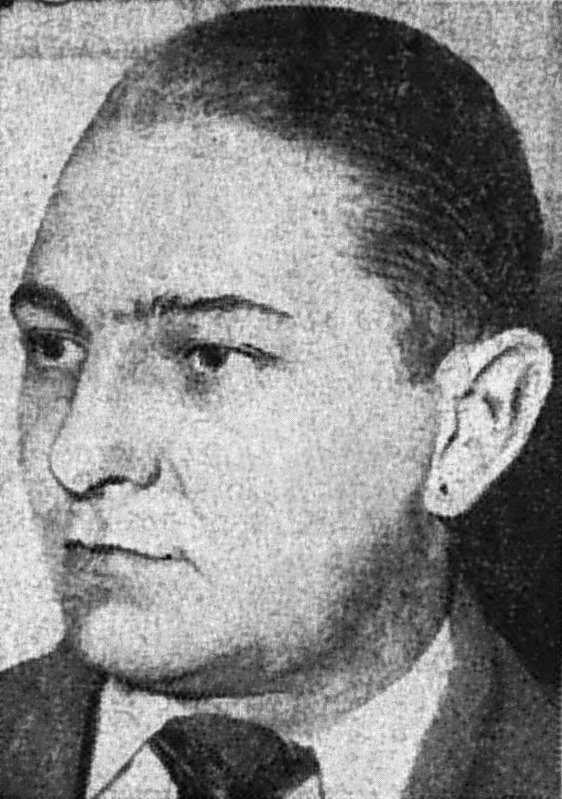
- Tixier-Vignancour in 1938

Member of the Chamber of Deputies for Basses-Pyrénées
- In office 2 January 1956 – 12 August 1958 (2 years, 7 months and 10 days)
- In office 27 September 1936 – 13 May 1942 (5 years, 7 months and 16 days)

Personal details
- Born: Jean-Louis Tixier; 12 October 1907 Paris, France
- Died: 29 September 1989 (aged 81) Paris, France
- Party: Party of New Forces (1979)
- Profession: Lawyer

Jean-Louis Tixier-Vignancour (French pronunciation: [ʒɑ̃ lwi tiksje viɲɑ̃kuʁ]; 12 October 1907 – 29 September 1989) was a French lawyer and far-right politician. Elected to the National Assembly in 1936, he initially collaborated with the Vichy regime before leaving for Tunisia in 1941. After a military court declared Tixier-Vignancour ineligible to hold public office for ten years for his early WWII activities, he joined the nationalist group Jeune Nation but left in 1954, opposed to their use of violence. He was re-elected to the Assembly in 1956, but lost his seat during the first legislative elections of the Fifth Republic.

Tixier-Vignancour was a candidate during the 1965 French presidential election, with Jean-Marie Le Pen as a campaign director, and received 5.2% of the votes, the biggest result for a far-right candidate since the war. He had also served as a lawyer for Louis-Ferdinand Céline in 1948, and for Raoul Salan during the 1962 OAS trials. In his later life, he became known as the main instigator in the theft of Philippe Pétain's coffin in 1973, and as a spokesman for the far-right Party of New Forces in the late 1970s. Jean-Louis Tixier-Vignancour died on 17 September 1989 at 81.

== Biography ==
=== Family and education (1907–1935) ===
Jean-Louis Tixier was born on 12 October 1907 in Paris, the son of Léon Tixier, a doctor, and Andrée Vignancour. His maternal grand-father, Louis Vignancour, had been a member of parliament and senator.

Tixier-Vignancour earned a degree in law in 1926 and the following year qualified as a barrister at the Paris Court of Appeal. He was an activist in the youth wing of the royalist movement Action Française, the Camelots du Roi. He took part in the anti-parliamentary riots of 6 February 1934.

=== Parliament, WWII and trial (1936–1952) ===
Tixier-Vignancour entered politics and defeated the independent leftist Georges Moutet in the French legislative election of the department of Basses-Pyrénées in May 1936. His election was however declared non-valid after suspicions of fraud. Tixier-Vignancour was eventually re-elected on 27 September 1936. He was part of a parliamentary group which traveled to Spain to congratulate Francisco Franco on his fight against the Spanish Popular Front. Tixier-Vignancour married Janine Auriol in January 1938, the daughter of a lawyer and member of parliament for Haute-Garonne.

Enlisted in the army in 1939, he took part in fights near Beuvraignes during the Battle of France in 1940, before voting for the law that gave full powers (pleins pouvoirs) to Philippe Pétain on 10 July of the same year. On 6 October 1940, in charge of "applying the instructions of the armistice commission", he confirmed the banning of movies like The Great Illusion or Entente cordiale, accused of "incitement to hatred against Germany". Tixier-Vignancour served as the under-Secretary of State for Information under Nazi-collaborationist Vichy France and as director of Pétain’s "Propaganda Committee". As the head of Radio-Vichy, he offered a large broadcast time to collaborationist Marcel Déat.

On 20 July 1941, he was interned in Vals-les-Bains after he resigned from the Vichy regime over its increasingly pro-collaborationist stance, but was freed by highly-placed friends and in December moved to Tunisia. In early November 1942, the Allies invaded the German-occupied Maghreb during Operation Torch, and Tixier-Vignancour was interned by the German authorities for his links to the resistance. He was released following the ejection of the Axis powers from North Africa by the Allies in May 1943. After his liberation, Tixier-Vignancour joined the French Expeditionary Corps in Italy as a lieutenant but was recalled to Tunis in January 1944 and placed under house arrest by senior offices suspicious of his previous activities in the Vichy government. Released in April he joined an Anglo-French unit before being arrested again on account of his collaborationist past and eventually being imprisoned in Paris by the French Committee of National Liberation before being cleared of the worst charges of collaboration in October 1945 but being declared ineligible to hold public office for ten years on 4 December 1945.

In 1948, Tixier-Vignancour became the lawyer of French novelist Louis-Ferdinand Céline, accused of "collaboration with the enemy" for his antisemitic and pro-occupation writings. He obtained Céline's amnesty on 26 April 1951, after he presented his client under his real name, Louis-Ferdinand Destouches, with no judge able to draw a relationship between Destouches and his pen name, Céline. While waiting for his electoral ban period to end, Tixier-Vignancou joined the neo-fascist party Jeune Nation soon after its creation in 1949. He helped Maurice Bardèche establish the magazine Défense de l'Occident (an important arena for the discussion of right-wing ideas and Holocaust denial text) and the neo-fascist coalition European Social Movement in 1951-52.

=== Amnesty and Algerian war (1953–1962) ===
Tixier-Vignancour was granted amnesty in 1953 and became once again able to run for public office. Opposing the use of street violence promoted by Jeune Nation, he left the group to found his own party with Bardèche in May 1954: the Rassemblement National Français.

Re-elected in the department of Basses-Pyrénées, Tixier-Vignancour served as a Non-Inscrit ("non-attached member") in the National Assembly between January 1956 and December 1958, where he allied himself with the Poujadists. Following the May 1958 crisis and the return of Charles de Gaulle to power, he refused to vote a law that would temporarily authorize the president to revise the constitution until a referendum occurs on a new one. Tixier-Vignancour declared ironically in parliament: "I would never have thought that, twice in my life, I will be asked to delegate the fraction of constituting power I held, and—even better—never would I have imagined that, for the second time, the man who asks for it will be the very same man who punished me for having delegated this power a first time." The Fifth Republic was eventually established on 4 October 1958, approved by 82% of the French in September. On 30 November 1958, Tixier-Vignancour lost his seat to a Radical candidate in the first legislative elections of the new regime. After the dissolution of Jeune Nation by official decree earlier that year, he wrote articles for the group's magazine, launched on 5 July 1958 as an attempt to revive the banned movement.

Opposed to decolonization and independence during the Algerian war (1954–1962), Tixier-Vignancour was, along with Jean-Marie Le Pen, one of the founders of the National Front for French Algeria (Front National pour l'Algérie Française) in July 1960. As a lawyer, he defended Raoul Salan in 1962, the founder of the pro-colonial paramilitary organization OAS and one of the four generals who directed the Algiers putsch of 1961. Salan was spared the death penalty and instead condemned to prison. Tixier-Vignancour’s defense credited for "saving Salan’s neck", this event boosted his standing among nationalists. He served also as a defense counsel for colonel Jean Bastien-Thiry, executed for attempting to assassinate Charles de Gaulle during the Petit-Clamart attack of August 1962.

=== Presidential campaign (1963–1965) ===
In November 1963, Tixier-Vignancour publicly announced his candidacy for the 1965 presidential election, presenting himself as the "militant of all the nationalist parties whichever they may be". On 17 July 1964, he established the Tixier-Vignancour committees (comités T.V.), a grassroots movement to support his candidacy for president the following year, with Jean-Marie Le Pen as a campaign director. Some 80 local "comités T.V." were set up throughout France and the Comité Jeunes ("Youth Committee"), directed by Roger Holeindre and supported by the group Occident, quickly attracted several hundred members. The first meeting in Paris gathered some 4,000 militants and led to violent clashes between Occident and the police. After a disagreement between Le Pen and Occident's founder Pierre Sidos, the movement was replaced with Dominique Venner's Europe-Action volunteers, despite their own initial skepticism regarding Tixier-Vignancour’s candidacy.

Tixier-Vignancour managed to rally diverse leanings that existed within the far-right, all united against Gaullism: the young revolutionaries of Occident and Europe-Action were present, along with "those nostalgic for Vichy, descendants of Action Française, fundamentalist Catholics, Algérie française ultras, the residue of Poujadism, embryonic fascists, and representatives of the liberal right". Despite his conservative stance, the then president Charles de Gaulle embodied in their eyes "‘the loss of Algeria, the end of the Empire, the weakening of the army, and closer ties with the communist world." At the height of the campaign, Le Pen and Tixier-Vignancour even went to London to meet members of the British Conservative Party and potentially use it as an example for a new conservative-nationalist party in France.

Tixier-Vignancour's movement participated in the municipal elections of March 1965 and received 9.6% of the votes in Paris. This encouraging result was followed, in the summer of 1965, by poll predictions crediting Tixier-Vignancour with 19% of the presidential vote. The latter began to imagine a first-round score of up to 25%, and a victory in the second round. Acting as if he was already president, Tixier-Vignancour traveled during the campaign to Saigon, Bonn, Rome and London. He abandoned his radical far-right rhetoric to court the moderate right, his campaign managers labeling him the "national and liberal opposition" against the extremist Charles de Gaulle. A former Vichy collaborator, Tixier-Vignancour yet invoked the name of French WWII resister Jean Moulin to serve his campaign. Despite this calculated attempts at moderating his positions, commentators portrayed Tixier-Vignancour as "the alliance of Algérie française, Poujadism and the spirit of Vichy", and he was only endorsed in the media by the radical right-wing press: Rivarol, Europe-Action, Aspects de la France and Minute.

Supported by a disparate and sometimes hostile alliance of far-rights groups, and lacking the necessary party structure, Tixier-Vignancour's failed at 5.2% of the votes in December 1965 After that, he publicly called for a vote in favor of Socialist candidate François Mitterrand in the second round. Deceived by his multiple renunciations—from the moderation of stance to his support of Mitterrand—, Le Pen decided to quit the campaign. Votes for Tixier-Vignancour were heavily concentrated in the south of France, a region which had already seen the highest levels of "no" votes in the Évian Agreements referendum and where many Pieds-noirs had settled after their recent repatriation from Algeria in 1962.

=== Later life (1966–1989) ===
Tixier-Vignancour participated in a pro-Israel demonstration in 1967 in Paris during the Six-Day War. During the May 1968 crisis, he endorsed re-elected president De Gaulle to put an end to the general disorder. In the 1969 presidential election, he supported Gaullist candidate Georges Pompidou.

He was the main instigator in the theft of Philippe Pétain's coffin of February 1973. He joined the far-right Party of New Forces (PFN) in June 1978, of which he became the honorary president and spokesman. In 1979, he unsuccessfully ran for the PFN in the European elections and eventually left the party in February 1982.

He died on 17 September 1989 at 81 in Paris. His funeral was celebrated in Saint-Nicolas-du-Chardonnet church, a stronghold of the Christian traditionalist Society of Saint Pius X.

== Views ==
Strongly anti-communist, he endorsed during his 1965 campaign the NATO military and nuclear alliance with the United States, to defend the "humanist and Christian West" against "communism and its Trojan horse, Gaullism". Arguing that France should reduce development aid towards its former colonies, he coined the slogan "la Corrèze passe avant le Zambèze" ("Corrèze comes before the Zambezi"). Tixier-Vignancour was also fervently opposed to immigration, labeling himself a supporter of "French Algeria" rather than "Algerian France". He argued for "strict and rigorously selected quotas" for Algerian immigrants to "avoid the invasion of France by a multitude of starving mouths, undesirables and invalids with no technical or social education".

== Private life ==
Jean-Louis Tixier-Vignancour was the godfather of Jean-Marie Le Pen's daughter Caroline.

== See also ==
- French 1965 presidential election
- Far-right in France

== Notes ==
=== Bibliography ===
- Guillaume, Sylvie (1998). Dictionnaire des parlementaires d'Aquitaine sous la Troisième République. Presses Univ de Bordeaux. ISBN 9782867812316.
- Shields, James G. (2007). The Extreme Right in France: From Pétain to Le Pen. Routledge. ISBN 978-0415372008.

=== Further reading ===
- Croix, Alexandre (1965). Tixier-Vignancour: ombres et lumières. Éditions du Vieux-Saint-Ouen. ASIN B003RHARUQ.
- Louis-Ferdinand Céline, Lettres à Tixier : 44 lettres inédites à Me Tixier-Vignancour, texte établi et présenté par Frédéric Monnier. Paris : la Flûte de Pan, 1985. 143 pages. ISBN 2-903267-23-5. (Letters to Tixier: 44 unpublished letters to Me Tixier-Vignancour)
- Tixier-Vignancour, J.-L., J’ai choisi la défense, Paris, La Table Ronde, 1964.
