= Pierre Bousquet =

French politician (1919–1991)

- Born: November 1919; Tours, France
- Died: 27 August 1991 (aged 71); Paris, France
- Occupation: Journalist
- Political party: National Front (1972–1980); French Nationalist Party (1983–1991)

Pierre Bousquet (French: [pjɛʁ buskɛ]; November 1919 – 27 August 1991) was a French journalist and far-right politician. A former section leader (Rottenführer) in the Waffen-SS Charlemagne Division, Bousquet was the first treasurer and a founding member of the National Front in 1972.

== Biography ==
=== Early life and WWII ===
Pierre Bousquet was born in November 1919 in Tours. He became a member of the youth movement of the Mouvement Franciste in 1936. In 1941 Marcel Bucard appointed him director of the commanding office of Jeunesse française. On 25 August 1943, Bousquet joined the Waffen-SS in Alsace and ended up with the rank of Rottenführer in the Charlemagne Division.

=== 1950–1960s ===
After the liberation of France in August 1944, he managed to convince the American troops that he had been a forced member of the Service du travail obligatoire, and was designated to be in charge of organizing the arrest and the return to France of former collaborationists. Back in Paris in 1946, he tried to infiltrate anti-communist movements with a clandestine group of former Waffen-SS in order to manipulate them. Bousquet then became an activist in the neo-fascist movement Jeune Nation led by Pierre Sidos in the late 1950s.

A member of the euro-nationalist magazine Europe-Action, he replaced Dominique Venner as the president of the European Rally for Liberty following its failure in the 1967 legislative election, along with another former Waffen-SS named Pierre Clémenti. This takeover, along with the relations maintained with the German neo-Nazi NPD and seminars held on Mein Kampf, triggered a wave of resignations. In March 1968, an extraordinary session of the REL's national council excluded Bousquet and Venner from the movement.

=== 1970–1980s ===
Bousquet created the nationalist magazine Militant with Pierre Pauty in December 1967. He participated in the founding of the National Front (FN) in 1972 and was its first treasurer. Bousquet left the party in 1980, dismissing the FN as pro-Zionist since the assassination of François Duprat in 1978. He launched in 1983 the French Nationalist Party along with former Waffen-SS Jean Castrillo.

=== Later life and death ===
He declared in 1986 that he did not see his past in the Waffen-SS as a "youthful mistake", but condemned gas chambers and Nazi torture in an equivocal manner: "assuming–and I mean assuming–that there were gas chambers and torture, I condemn them." He added that he kept on advocating a "White Europe, from Brest to Vladivostok".

Bousquet died in 1991. FN founding members Roger Holeindre and Roland Gaucher were present at his funeral. He was a neo-pagan.
