= Europe-Action =

White nationalist French political movement

- Type: Monthly magazine
- Publisher: Société de Presse et d'Édition Saint-Just
- Founded: January 1963
- Ceased publication: November 1966
- Political alignment: Pan-European nationalism
- Language: French
- Country: France
- Circulation: 7,500–10,000

Europe-Action was a far-right and euro-nationalist magazine and movement, founded by Dominique Venner in 1963 and active until 1966. Distancing itself from pre-WWII fascist ideas such as anti-intellectualism, anti-parliamentarianism and traditional French nationalism, Europe-Action promoted a pan-European nationalism based on the "Occident"—or the "white peoples"— and a social Darwinism escorted by racialism, labeled "biological realism". These theories, along with the meta-political strategy of Venner, influenced young Europe-Action journalist Alain de Benoist and are deemed conducive to the creation of GRECE and the Nouvelle Droite in 1968.

== History ==
=== Background: 1958–1962 ===
In his 1962 manifesto Pour une critique positive ("For a Positive Critique"), written while he was in prison, former Jeune Nation member Dominique Venner rejected the myth of a coup de force, convinced that political revolution was impossible before a cultural revolution occurred. He believed that this cultural transformation could be achieved by publicly promoting nationalist ideas until they gained widespread support. Venner held that both intellectual persuasion and violence had their roles, but his movement needed to prioritize ideas over action. He also sought to remove the "old ideas" associated with pre‑World War II nationalism and fascism—such as anti-parliamentarianism, anti-intellectualism, and a form of patriotism limited solely to the nation-state.

The text became influential in nationalist circles, with François Duprat comparing For a Positive Critique to Lenin's What is to be Done?, a political pamphlet written 16 years before the Bolshevik Revolution. These nationalists maintained an ambiguous view of Nazism; Europe-Action, for example, quoted Maurice Bardèche as saying that "next to genial intuitions, Hitler made mistakes," attributing these errors to a "lack of established doctrinal foundations."

The group was further influenced by the Manifesto of the Class of '60, published three years before Europe-Action was founded. In that manifesto, the pro-colonial founders of the Federation of Nationalist Students (FEN) committed themselves to "action of profound consequence", as opposed to the "sterile activism" of mere street violence that Jeune Nation had promoted in the 1950s. Although Europe-Action members remained deeply committed to the cause of French Algeria, they also recognised the emerging world shaped by decolonisation and the consolidation of the French Fifth Republic. As a result, they sought to develop a radical right ideology based on elements beyond Vichy nostalgia and Catholic traditionalism.

=== Political activism: 1963–1966 ===
Europe-Action was launched in January 1963 by Dominique Venner as a nationalist movement, accompanied by a magazine of the same name. Soon after its launch, Alain de Benoist and François d'Orcival joined the publication as journalists. Initially, Jacques Ploncard d'Assac contributed to the magazine, but he soon repudiated its anti-Christian stance and left in August 1963. The magazine was published by Société de Presse et d'Édition Saint-Just, a company founded in November 1962 by Venner, Suzanne Gingembre (the wife of former OAS treasurer Maurice Gingembre), and Jacques de Larocque-Latour, a racist caricaturist. Pierre Bousquet, a former member of the Waffen-SS, later became part of the company.

In 1964, Alain de Benoist took over as editor-in-chief of the weekly Europe-Action hebdomadaire. Along with the Federation of Nationalist Students, Europe-Action supported the far-right presidential candidacy of Jean-Louis Tixier-Vignancour in 1965 through the Tixier-Vignancour Committees. Following a dispute between Occident leader Pierre Sidos and campaign director Jean-Marie Le Pen, Europe-Action volunteers stepped in to support Tixier-Vignancour by joining his Comité Jeunes ("Youth Committee"). Venner's movement also mobilised its militant base to organise demonstrations against Algerian immigration.

From June 1965 to 1966, Jean Mabire served as redactor-in-chief of Europe-Action. After Tixier-Vignancour’s electoral defeat, key members of Europe-Action founded the European Rally for Liberty (REL) in 1966, in collaboration with young nationalists from the Federation of Nationalist Students. During the campaign, Europe-Action hebdomadaire became the organ of the REL before being replaced by a short-lived magazine titled L'Observateur Européen. The REL managed to field only 27 candidates during the 1967 legislative election, garnering just 2.58% of the vote, a failure often seen as paving the way for the creation of the ethno-nationalist think tank GRECE and the evolution of Nouvelle Droite meta-politics.

The magazine released its final issue in November 1966 following the bankruptcy of its publishing house, and Europe-Action ceased to exist in the summer of 1967 after an unsuccessful attempt to revive the publication. At its peak, the magazine had an estimated circulation of between 7,500 and 10,000 copies. Its symbol was a hoplite helmet.

== Views ==
The movement developed two main thesis: a "biological realism" composed of racialism and social Darwinism; and a pan-European nationalism built on a common Western civilization seen as the link between the peoples of the "white race". These ideas were to be promoted through a meta-political strategy of ideological influence until the eventual achievement of cultural dominance in wider society.

=== Biological realism ===
"Biological realism", a concept coined by French neo-fascist activist René Binet in 1950, promoted the establishment of individual and racial inequalities upon pseudo-scientific observations. Binet argued that "interbreeding capitalism" ("capitalisme métisseur") aimed at creating a "uniform inhumanity" ("barbarie uniforme"); and that only "a true socialism" could "achieve race liberation" through the "absolute segregation at both global and national level." Europe-Action also drew influence from the so-called "message of Uppsala", a text likely wrote in 1958 by French neo-fascists related to the New European Order, and deemed influential on European far-right movements that followed as it carried out subtle semantic shifts between "differentialism" and "inequality". The ideas of Binet and "Uppsala", characterized by a worldwide "biological-cultural deal" where each group would remain sovereign in its own region, foreshadowed both the racialism of Europe-Action and the ethno-pluralism of GRECE.

Following the Algerian independence in 1962, Europe-Action was among the first to oppose Algerian immigration (labeled "invasion"). The group defended a racial rather than geographical nationalism, proclaiming race to be "the new homeland, the homeland of the flesh which should be defended with an animal-like ferocity." Opposed to ethnic mix, they called for remigration, arguing that "race mixing [was] nothing more than a slow genocide". Calling for an end to development aid towards former colonies, they feared a future France "occupied by twenty million Maghrebi Arabs and twenty million Negro-Africans".

In France, the significant immigration of colored elements is a grave issue […]. We also know the size of the North African population [...]. What is serious for the future: we know that the basis of European settlement, which allowed for civilizing expansion, was that of a white ethnic group. The destruction of this balance, which can be quick, will lead to our disappearance and that of our civilization.

— Dominique Venner, Europe-Action, nº 38, février 1966, p. 8.

Europe-Action promoted the project of creating a genetically improved social elite along with, "without futile sentimentality", the elimination of "biological waste", "not through massacres but through eugenic processes". They proposed to "eliminate biological foam" by "returning the mediocre elements of this class to their ranks and retain the valid elite" only, in order "not to allow the biological growth of waste".

=== Euro-nationalism ===
Their conception of Europe was not limited to the continent, and described as a "heart whose blood beats in Johannesburg and in Quebec City, in Sydney and Budapest, aboard white caravels and spaceships, on every sea and in every desert in the world." Europe-Action issue of June 1964 indeed grouped the US, France and South Africa together, as mere "provinces of this large motherland that is the white race."

The "Dictionary of the militant", published in Europe-Action in May 1963, defined the Occident as the "community of the white peoples", the people itself being defined as a "biological unity confirmed by history". The following definition of nationalism is thus given: "doctrine that expresses in political terms the philosophy and the vital necessities of the white people". According to political scientist Stéphane François, this world view was influenced by the Völkisch idea of an organic entity gathering those of the same blood, the same culture and same destiny.

Rejecting both the Europe of the nation-states advocated by the Gaullists and the United States of Europe endorsed by the Christian democrats, Europe-Action supported a racialist Europe that would have been founded on its indigenous ethnic groups, uniting the white peoples of Europe within a powerful imperial entity eventually crowned by an international alliance with white-minority-ruled states like Rhodesia or South Africa.

=== Meta-politics ===
Initially conceived as a think tank founded on a magazine, Europe-Action gradually evolved towards a political movement. Seeking to oppose the anti-intellectualism that had been a major hindrance to the right in the battle of ideas—notably against the Marxist set of concepts—Venner aimed at establishing a new radical right doctrine to be spread in wider society and bring about a nationalist cultural revolution. He progressively accepted the democratic institutions and the emergence of a post-fascist society, arguing that Europe-Action had to show the bureaucracy they were capable of running a state to win their support. Describing Europe-Action members as "militants of a white nation", Venner concluded that nationalists should infiltrate organizations, "however small, including unions, local newspapers, even youth hostels" in order to disseminate their ideas.

== Legacy ==
Political scientist Stéphane François describes Europe-Action as "the main structure in France that bridged WWII activists and the young post-war generations". Jean-Yves Camus further adds that the "transition from French nationalism to the promotion of European identity, theorized by Europe-Action in the mid-1960s, disrupted the references of the French far-right by producing a gap that has not been repaired to date, separating integral sovereignists, for whom no level of sovereignty is legitimate except the Nation-State [...] from the identitarians, for whom the Nation-State is an intermediate framework between being rooted in a region (in the sense of the German "Heimat") and belonging to the civilized framework of Europe."

Europe-action theories indeed formed the ideological foundations of the think tank GRECE in 1968, and the magazine-movement has been described as the "embryonic form" of the Nouvelle Droite. The latter however distanced themselves from Europe-Action's anti-communism and pro-colonial stance, in order to develop a critic a liberal capitalism and adopt a Third-Worldist point of view. Many founding members of the ethno-nationalist think tank were indeed formerly involved in the magazine. GRECE and the Nouvelle Droite inherited a number of themes from Europe-Action, among them "the anti-Christian stance, a marked elitism, the racial notion of a united Europe, the seeds of a change from biological to cultural definitions of "difference", and the sophisticated inversion of terms like racism and anti-racism". Another group led by Pierre Bousquet, Jean Castrillo, and Pierre Pauty established the magazine Militant in 1967. They were later among the founders of the Front National in 1972, and at the origin of the French Nationalist Party in 1983.

== Notable members ==
- Dominique Venner — founder of Europe-Action
- Alain de Benoist — leader of the Nouvelle Droite
- Jean Mabire — founding member of the Mouvement Normand and Terre et Peuple
- François d'Orcival — member of the editorial committee at Valeurs Actuelles
- François Duprat — founding member of the Front National
- Maurice Rollet — founding member of the scouting association Europe-Jeunesse
- Pierre Bousquet — founding member of the Front National

== See also ==
- Jeune Nation
- Federation of Nationalist Students and the European Rally for Liberty
- GRECE
