= Tixier-Vignancour Committees =

Tixier-Vignancour Committees Comités Tixier-Vignancour
- Leader: Jean-Louis Tixier-Vignancour
- Secretary-General: Jean-Marie Le Pen (1964); Raymond Le Bourre (1967)
- Founded: April 20, 1964 (CTV); January 23, 1966 (ARLP)
- Dissolved: November 9, 1974 (de facto)
- Succeeded by: Mouvement nationaliste du progrès
- Headquarters: 6, rue de Beaune (Paris 7th) later 19, Boulevard de Sébastopol (Paris 1st)
- Ideology: Nationalism; Anti-Gaullism; Anti-communism
- Political position: Far-right

The Tixier-Vignancour Committees (Comités Tixier-Vignancour, also known as Comités TV and abbreviated as CTV) was a political movement in France aligned with the far-right, founded by Jean-Louis Tixier-Vignancour for the 1965 French presidential election.

After the election, in which Tixier-Vignancour secured 5.2% of the vote, the Comités TV transformed into the "Alliance républicaine pour les libertés et le progrès" (ARLP). The party did not achieve success and faded by 1974.

== History ==
=== Beginnings ===
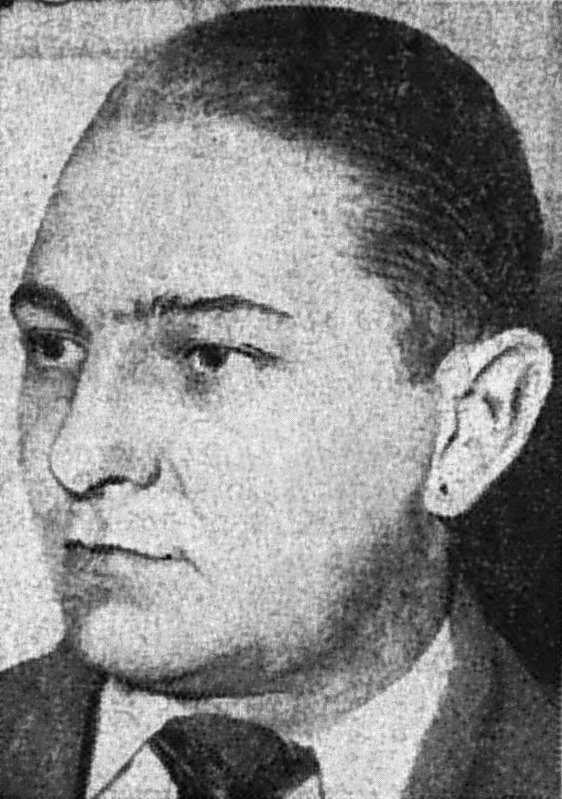
Jean-Louis Tixier-Vignancour in 1938, founder of the Committees bearing his name, candidate in the 1965 French presidential election.

Informally active since the previous year, the group was officially registered in the Journal officiel on July 17, 1964, under the name "Association pour le soutien de la candidature d'opposition nationale à la présidence de la République". Commonly referred to as "Tixier-Vignancour Committees" (Comités TV), it was led by far-right lawyer Jean-Louis Tixier-Vignancour.

From its inception, former deputy Jean-Marie Le Pen served as secretary general of the Comités TV and as campaign director for Tixier-Vignancour's 1965 presidential bid. Other former parliamentarians (Poujadists, members of the CNIP, and disillusioned Gaullists) joined the campaign, including Philippe Marçais, Jean-Robert Thomazo, Jean-Baptiste Biaggi, Alain de Lacoste-Lareymondie, and Jean Dides.

=== 1965 Elections ===
The Comités TV fielded candidates in the municipal elections of March 1965 in Paris.

In the December 1965 presidential election, Tixier-Vignancour placed fourth in the first round, receiving 5.20% of the vote. His strongest support came from the Midi, home to many Pied-Noirs displaced by the Algerian War. In the Var department, he garnered 14%. Strongly anti-Gaullist due to de Gaulle's Algerian policy, Tixier-Vignancour urged his supporters to vote for François Mitterrand, the left-wing candidate, in the second round. This recommendation divided his followers.

=== ARLP, Decline, and Dissolution ===
At the national congress in January 1966, Tixier-Vignancour and figures like Raymond Le Bourre, Raymond Bourgine, and Jean-Robert Thomazo transformed the Comités TV into the Alliance républicaine pour les libertés et le progrès (ARLP). The ARLP aimed to promote "doctrines of liberty and progress... in accordance with the spirit of Western civilization". However, Jean-Marie Le Pen did not participate, criticizing Tixier-Vignancour for his lack of political authority and for endorsing Mitterrand during the presidential runoff.

Prominent figures like Roger Holeindre, François Brigneau, and Dominique Venner also left, while members of Europe-Action formed the Nationalist Movement for Progress (MNP).

Defections increased in subsequent years. Raymond Le Bourre, the party's secretary general in 1967, left after disputes with Tixier-Vignancour. In 1968, Yvan Anchier established the Union for Progress and Freedoms (UPL), opposing Tixier-Vignancour's rapprochement with the majority. Another secretary general, Gaston de Sansac, resigned in 1971 to form the Independent and Liberal Republican Alliance (ARIL).

By 1973, the ARLP withdrew from the Gaullist majority. In 1974, Tixier-Vignancour proposed merging with the Republican Party of Valéry Giscard d'Estaing and the Democratic Centre of Jean Lecanuet.

== Ideology ==
Classified as far-right within the French political spectrum, the Tixier-Vignancour Committees brought together supporters of French Algeria, nationalists, anti-Gaullists, and anti-communists.
