= Jeune Nation =

French nationalist movement

- Leader: Pierre Sidos
- President: François Sidos
- Founded: October 22, 1949; 76 years ago
- Dissolved: May 15, 1958
- Succeeded by: Parti Nationaliste (1958–1959)
- Newspaper: Jeune Nation (1958–1960)
- Membership: 3,000–4,000 (at its height)
- Ideology: French nationalism Neo-fascism; Neo-Pétainism
- Political position: Far-right

Jeune Nation (French: [ʒœn nɑsjɔ̃]; English: Young Nation) was a French nationalist, neo-Pétainist and neo-fascist far-right movement founded in 1949 by Pierre Sidos and his brothers. Inspired by Fascist Italy and Vichy France, the group attracted support from many young nationalists during the Algerian war (1954–62), especially in the French colonial army. Promoting street violence and extra-parliamentarian insurrection against the Fourth Republic, members hoped the turmoils of the wars of decolonization would lead to a coup d'état followed by the establishment of a nationalist regime. Jeune Nation was the most significant French neo-fascist movement during the 1950s; it gathered at its height 3,000 to 4,000 members.

Suspected of a bomb attack in the National Assembly, Jeune Nation was dissolved by official decree during the May 1958 crisis. The organization nonetheless survived through the 1960s under the shape of several other nationalist organizations, primarily the Federation of Nationalist Students (1960–1967), the Organisation Armée Secrète (1961–1962), Europe-Action (1963–1966), Occident (1964–1968) and L'Œuvre Française (1968–2013), all established by former Jeune Nation members.

== History ==
=== Background: 1943–1948 ===
Jeune Nation's founder, Pierre Sidos, joined the fascist Parti Franciste in 1943 at 16 years old, the minimum required age. His father, François Sidos, was executed in 1946 for his involvement in the Vichy paramilitary Milice. Pierre avoided a harsher sentence since a minor at the time of the events and was convicted to five years in jail. The time he spent serving his sentence comforted the political convictions he had built before and during the war, and Pierre Sidos began to imagine "Jeune Nation" during prison time.

Discredited by earlier European far-right experiences, French nationalist parties scored poorly in elections from the fall of fascism in 1945 until the rise of the Front National in the 1980s. Neo-fascists groups nonetheless saw in the immediate post-war new reasons to swing into action, mainly the fight against communist expansion and the defense of the French empire's survival against the growing decolonization movement.

=== Creation and emergence: 1949–1953 ===
Released earlier from prison on 4 August 1948, Sidos quickly contacted his brothers François et Jacques to help him work on his project. In 1949, the final structure of the organization had been designed but the Sidos brothers lacked money, and far-right sponsors were not abundant in the immediate post-war. Pierre then requested assistance from Jeanne Pajot, a rich bonapartist and a friend of Pierre Taittinger, former leader of the Jeunesses Patriotes. She accepted to fund the movement, called at that time "La Jeune Nation", which held its first presentation on 22 October 1949 in Pajot's apartment. In 1952, they published a monthly magazine, Peuple de France et d'Outre-mer ("People of France and Overseas France"). The movement also tried to establish links with other nationalist right-wingers abroad, with Sidos traveling to London to visit fellow groups.

They were soon joined by other nationalists like Albert Heuclin, Jean Marot, Jacques Wagner and Jean-Louis Tixier-Vignancour. On 23 March 1950, the group was officially declared to the Prefecture of Police, but it remained publicly unknown for several years. In 1954, two events changed the destiny of Jeune Nation: the end of the First Indochina War on July 20, and the beginning of the Algerian War of Independence on November 1.

=== Street violence: 1954–1957 ===
The movement experienced a sudden fame and membership rose after the return of military personnel from south-East Asia. On 11 November 1954, ten days after the beginning of the Algerian War, Pierre Sidos announced the official birth of the movement "Jeune Nation" under its final name. Tixier-Vignancour, opposed to violent actions, soon left the group to create his own organization, the Rassemblement National Français. Jeune Nation held its first congress on 11 November 1955, when they adopted the Celtic cross as their emblem. Dismissing mass parties, Sidos aimed at creating a small and faithful army, with a revolutionary general staff ready to seize power and rule as a military junta when their moment has come.

Labeling themselves the "successors of those of 1934" and targeting young people in their recruitment, Jeune Nation was joined in 1956 by Dominique Venner, then 21, whose later opposition to Sidos marked a generational and ideological shift between the young "euro-nationalists" and the "nostalgic neo-Petainists of Pierre Sidos." If they were largely inspired by the ideologies of fascist Italy and Vichy France, Jeune Nation began at that time to break with the collaborationist circles that had been protecting them since Sidos' prison time. As Gaullists and former resisters were joining their ranks in the context of the Algerian war, Sidos banned any evocation of the period 1933–1945 among its militants, with only a few events like the commemorations of Robert Brasillach's death or the events of 6 February 1934 allowed to take place.

The group was known for their violent street attacks, especially on communist sympathizers. On 9–10 October 1954, a commando led by Sidos carjacked a van transporting issues of the communist newspaper L’Humanité Dimanche, then destroyed them and assaulted the driver who died a few months later as a result of his injuries. Hoping to calm down the situation, Sidos sent a letter to the newspaper Le Monde a few days later to "formally disapprove of the individual violence committed in recent times". In March 1958, Jean-Marie Le Pen testified at the trial of four Jeune Nation militants accused of being involved in the murder. During demonstrations organized held on 8 November 1956 to denounce the Soviet military intervention in the Hungarian Uprising, Jeune Nation stormed and partly set to fire the headquarters of the Communist Party in Paris. In the midst of protests at place de l'Étoile in April 1954, they mauled Prime Minister Joseph Laniel and Minister of Defense René Pleven, and on 25 November 1957 Jeune Nation organized a violent protest in front of the American embassy to denounce arms exports towards Algeria.

=== Dissolution and recreation attempts: 1958–1960 ===
Jeune Nation was dissolved on 15 May 1958 by an official decree of Jules Moch, then Minister of the Interior, two days after the putsch of Algiers and the beginning of the May 1958 crisis. The group was involved in the troubles of May 13 in Algeria, and had been suspected of a bomb attack that occurred on February 6 in a lavatory at the National Assembly.

The association was regardless declared again under a new name to the Police Prefecture on 7 October 1958, and publicly relaunched as "Parti Nationaliste" by Pierre Sidos and Dominique Venner during a congress attended by around 600 people on 6–8 February 1959. The new organization was designed by Venner as a coordination structure for all French far-right movements via a Comité d’Entente (Entente Committee). It was dissolved only four days later on 12 February 1959 following violent protests against Prime Minister Michel Debré in Algeria. In May 1959, Venner and three Jeune Nation militants were arrested for assaulting a group of Black students from Martinique near the Gare du Nord, for which Venner was sentenced to three months in prison. Both Venner and Sidos were eventually arrested, respectively in April 1961 and July 1962, after the issue of an arrest warrant on 24 January 1960 for "recreating a disbanded league" and "compromising State security". They were convicted on 19 June 1963 to a suspended 3-year jail sentence and a 2,000 Fr fine.

The bi-monthly magazine Jeune Nation, launched on 5 July 1958 to serve as an ideological organ for the rebirth of the group, was not affected by the new dissolution of February 1959. The periodical, which violently attacked Charles de Gaulle as far as publicly calling for his assassination, had turned into a monthly magazine in January after financial and readership difficulties. Articles were written by Jacques Ploncard d'Assac, Henry Coston, Pierre-Antoine Cousteau, and Tixier-Vignancour, among others.

Joined by the young François d'Orcival, Pierre Poichet and Georges Schmeltz (known as "Pierre Marcenet") in September 1959, the last issue of the magazine Jeune Nation was seized four months later by the police on 28 January 1960. The three students then decided to found on 12 April 1960 the Federation of Nationalist Students (FEN). Initially favourable to the project, Sidos eventually opposed the euro-nationalist stance introduced by Venner and adopted by the FEN. He broke with the latter in 1964 to create Occident.

== Ideology ==
Jeune Nation defended anti-parliamentarianism, corporatism, the French army and the colonial empire, racism, antisemitism, and advocated violent actions to overthrow the regime. They also dismissed political parties, communism, liberal democracy and what they saw as its embodiment, namely the United States.

=== Agenda ===
Their political agenda was the establishment of an "authoritarian and popular, national and social State," similar to the Révolution nationale of Vichy France: a new army to "educate the youth", the expropriation of housings formerly possessed by "expelled métèques [wogs] deemed undesirable", an Italian fascist-like corporatist unionism, the "elimination of stateless capitalism and effortless incomes" and the founding of a state led by a "selected and politically educated" elite. Jeune Nation was however less vichyst than other contemporary nostalgic movements whose main raison d'être was the defence of the memory of Philippe Pétain.

The movement tried to launch a revolutionary fight outside of the parliamentary system in order to overthrow the Fourth Republic, which was according to them "the only hope for nationalism". Jean Malardier, adherent of Jeune Nation and former LVF member, described the group as "aspiring and devoting the whole of itself to the national insurrection". The ideas of "democracy" and "decadence" were interwoven in the group's analysis of society, their doctrine stating that "fighting against [France's] decadence [meant] fighting against the [democratic] regime". Jeune Nation also referred to the achievement of a "second revolution", the first one being that of 1940 and evidently not that of 1789. They also envisaged the construction of Europe "from Narvik to Cape Town" and "from Brest to Bucharest", "founded on the common civilization and destiny of the white race".

=== Structure ===
Pierre Sidos was the chief ideologue and leader of Jeune Nation. His brother François served as the president, and Jean Malardier as the treasurer. The leadership team was called the conductoire.

=== Symbols ===
The group used the Celtic Cross as their symbol, which may come from an initiation to Celtic esotericism Sidos received in prison in 1946–1948 from Marcel Bibé, a former Bezen Perrot member. During his internment, Sidos began to write about druidism and the Celtic Cross, which he described as the allegory of the "walking sun and universal life" in his prison notes. Sidos has stated that he was looking for a simple emblem to reproduce, unlike the eagle or the wild boar used by fascist groups at that time. Since its 1949 revival by Jeune Nation, the symbol has become popular among far-right movements in France and beyond in Europe.

== Notable members ==
- Pierre Sidos — founder of Jeune Nation, Occident and L'Œuvre Française
- Dominique Venner — founder of Europe-Action
- François d'Orcival — member of the editorial committee at Valeurs Actuelles
- Jean-Louis Tixier-Vignancour — candidate in the 1965 presidential election
- Jean-Jacques Susini — co-founder of the Organisation Armée Secrète
- François Duprat — founding member of the Front National
- Richard Bohringer (Note: Joined on 30 September 1958, four months after the dissolution decree (according to a membership application given by Pierre Sidos to the magazine Charles in 2013).) — César Award for Best Actor recipient
- Pierre Bousquet — founding member of the Front National
- Pierre Vial
- Alain Robert

== Legacy ==
=== Continuity ===
Jeune Nation formed the most significant part of civil members in the pro-colonial paramilitary group Organisation Armée Secrète (OAS), founded in 1961. If they tried to import the OAS structures into Europe (via OAS-Métro), they never managed to spread the armed insurrection outside of Algeria.

Pierre Sidos created Occident in 1964, but broke with the group in 1965–1966. He then founded L'Œuvre Française in 1968, and remained its leader until 2012.

Following the ban of its organ Le Soleil in 1990, L'Œuvre Française founded in early 1994 in new magazine named Jeune Nation. L'Œuvre dissolved by official decree on 24 July 2013 along with its youth movement, "Jeunesses Nationalistes", the website was re-activated by nationalist militants Yvan Benedetti and Alexandre Gabriac, with the copyright "1958–2013 Jeune Nation".

=== Post-fascist split ===
The Federation of Nationalist Students (FEN) was created in 1960 by former Jeune Nation students after the publication of a "Manifesto of the Class of '60" where they committed themselves to "action of profound consequence", as opposed to "sterile activism", thus breaking with the street insurrection previously advocated by Jeune Nation.

Dominique Venner launched his nationalist magazine Europe-Action in 1963 and aimed at removing "old ideas" from nationalism and fascism, such as anti-parliamentarianism, anti-intellectualism or a patriotism reduced to the boundaries of the nation-state—promoting instead a pan-European nationalism. Venner also abandoned the myth of the coup de force ("power grab") and asserted that a political revolution would not be able to happen before a cultural one, which could be reached only via the public promotion of nationalist ideas until they achieve majority approval.

== See also ==
- Parti Franciste; first movement joined by Pierre Sidos in 1943,
- Federation of Nationalist Students, the Organisation Armée Secrète, Europe-Action, Occident and L'Œuvre Française; main organizations that succeeded Jeune Nation,
- French Fourth Republic and Algerian War; for historical context.
