= Europe-Jeunesse =

Neo-pagan Scouting and Guiding organization in France

Europe-Jeunesse is a French neo-pagan scouting organization established in 1973 and influenced by Nouvelle Droite values.

== History ==
After a meeting held in December 1972 between GRECE members Jean Mabire, Maurice Rollet and Jean-Claude Valla to discuss the creation of a pagan scouting organization, Europe-Jeunesse organized its first camp in Bussy-en-Othe in July 1973, under the supervision of Raymond Ferrand, a former member of Europe-Action. Europe-Jeunesse is an attempt at a synthesis between the early French scouting movement of Nicolas Benoit (1875–1914) and the pre-Nazi German Youth Movement. The group adopted the symbol of the defunct Europe-Action and the FEN, a hoplite helmet.

Europe-Jeunesse is made up of ten ethno-cultural bans: "Gallia Belgica" for Wallonia, "Liguerie" for the Nice region, "Blood and Gold" around Nîmes, "Armed-Lions" in the Périgord, "Alpine" around Lyon and Grenoble, "An Avel Mor" in Brittany, "Comté Toulousain", "Île-de-France", "Alsace" and "Normandie". Each group is led by around sixty people who are part in maîtrises (supervisory staffs). Activities follow natural pagan rhythms: the equinox, the solstice, the gathering of mistletoe, a camp for the Celtic Festival of Samhain, etc.

== Members ==
Yvan Benedetti was a member of Europe-Jeunesse in his youth, as were the children of Jean-Yves Le Gallou.
