= Alain Lefebvre (journalist) =

French journalist

- Born: 1 April 1947 (age 79); France
- Occupation: Journalist
- Known for: Writer

Alain Lefebvre, born 1 April 1947, is a French journalist.

A former activist of the Fédération des étudiants nationalistes (Federation of Nationalist Students), Lefebvre also contributed to Cahiers universitaires, the movement's newspaper. In 1968, he became one of the founders of the Groupement de recherche et d'études pour la civilisation européenne (GRECE). After that, he joined the Le Figaro Magazine (Figaro diary) with Alain de Benoist and other "neo-rightists". He founded the ephemeral Magazine hebdo while managing the groupe Media and L'Histoire magazine.

Lefebvre is also interested in advertising in collaboration with journalist Christian Blachas, and is also host of the show Culture-Pub.
