= Roger Holeindre =

French politician (1929–2020)

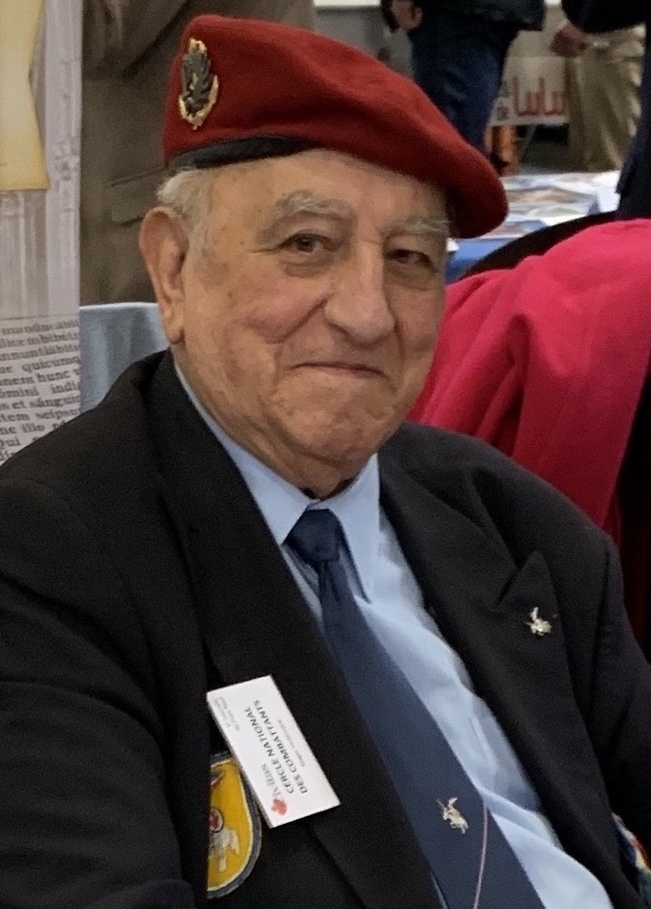

Personal details
- Born: 21 March 1929 Corrano, Corse-du-Sud
- Died: 30 January 2020 (aged 90) Vaucresson, France
- Party: Party of France
- Occupation: Politician

Roger Holeindre (French pronunciation: [ʁɔʒe ɔlɛ̃dʁ]; 21 March 1929 – 30 January 2020) was a French Army paratrooper veteran, politician and author. He served in the First Indochina War and the Algerian War, was a member of the National Assembly from 1986 to 1988. Holeindre also served as the vice-president of the National Front (FN) where he represented the "national-conservative" tendency, opposed to "nationalist revolutionaries" and Third Position ideologies. Holeindre was the president of the Cercle national des combattants and the honorary president of the Party of France.

== Life and activism ==
Roger Holeindre was born on 21 March 1929 in Corrano, Corse-du-Sud. He grew up in Vosges and then Seine-Saint-Denis. In 1989, he wrote À tous ceux qui n'ont rien compris ("To those who haven't understood a thing") in which he claims to have stolen two machine guns from the Germans in August 1944 and that the operation got a friend killed. It has not been proven or denied he joined any Resistance organisation afterwards, but it can be assumed he never had any connection with the German occupation forces as he did not receive any jail sentence after 1945 (which was a pre-requisite to any investigation for suspicious persons about collaboration in France at that time).

After working as a steel worker, he volunteered for the Indochina War in 1948 and later for the Algerian War. After being almost fatally wounded in the head, he was demobilized and lived in the city of Tebessa in the East of Algeria. He created there a youth center for education of Muslim locals. He joined the Organisation armée secrète (OAS), a right-wing terrorist movement opposed to the 1962 Évian Accords which granted independence to Algeria. Holeindre also founded the FAF (Front pour l'Algérie Française, Front for French Algeria). He met with Bruno Gollnisch in this period. In 1962, Holeindre was sentenced to 14 years in prison for his involvement with the OAS, albeit he was amnestied after serving roughly 3.5 years. He then worked as a reporter for Paris-Match, while in the same time counselling young Occident far-right activists.

In January 1968, Holeindre founded the Front uni de soutien au Sud-Viêt-Nam (United Front in Support of South Vietnam) and supported the US war effort. Occident actively participated in this Front. Holeindre also maintained contacts with the direction of the WACL (World Anticommunist League), supported by the Taiwanese authorities. Présent, a newspaper close to the FN, then published the congratulations telegram sent to Holeindre after his election as deputy in 1986 by the President of the WACL and President of the National Assembly of Taiwan, Ku Chen Kang.

Holeindre became a member of the political bureau of the National Front, created in 1972 by Jean-Marie Le Pen, along with François Brigneau. When the "nationalist revolutionary" tendency of the French far-right founded, in 1972, the Front national pour l'unité française (FNUF, National Front for French Unity, original name of the FN), they opened it to their rivals of the "national-conservative" tendency. Thus, Jean-Marie Le Pen, Roger Holeindre and Pierre Durand (a former Poujadist) sieged at the side of the "nationalists" François Brigneau, Alain Robert, Pierre Bousquet (former Waffen-SS), Jean Vallette d'Osia (former resistant who later testified in favor of the revisionist Pierre Vial), and Rolande Birgy (former resistant). After the first split, at the end of 1973 (leading to the creation of the PFN), François Duprat continued to represent the "nationalist" tendency inside the FN.

Holeindre served as a member of the National Assembly for the Seine Saint Denis region from 1986 to 1988. He subsequently served as the vice-president of the FN. He also presided over the Cercle national des combattants (National veterant circle), a veteran association close to the FN. He supported Le Pen against Bruno Mégret's attempt to seize control of the FN, and claimed to follow Jean-Pierre Stirbois's nationalist and solidarist current.

Holeindre was part of the "TSM" current (Tous sauf Mégret, Anybody But Mégret), along with Samuel Maréchal, Marine Le Pen, Jean-Claude Martinez, and the Catholic current represented by Bernard Antony and Bruno Gollnisch, as well as Martine Lehideux. The split between Mégret and Le Pen started on 16 July 1997 meeting near Strasbourg during which Roger Holeindre started the hostilities, by stating that the FN, in the French colonial tradition, should return to a more "paternalist" approach on immigration issues, and criticized "ideological racialism" theories, targeting Nouvelle Droite supporters and former members of the Club de l'Horloge.

He supported Bruno Gollnisch during the campaign for the leadership of the National Front in 2010, defeated by his rival Marine Le Pen the following year. Roger Holeindre then joined the Party of France. He entered the political bureau in 2013 and became honorary president in 2016.

== Decorations ==
- Médaille militaire
- Croix de guerre des théâtres d'opérations extérieures
- Croix de la Valeur Militaire
- Croix du combattant volontaire

== Works ==
- Holeindre, Roger (1963). Le Levain de la colère. Paris: Éditions Saint-Just. OCLC 460642414.
- Holeindre, Roger (1965). Honneur ou décadence. Meaux: Éditions du Fuseau. OCLC 7410783.
- Holeindre, Roger (1974). Requiem pour trois sous-offs. Aulnay-sous-Bois: Presses SPIP. OCLC 949182205.
- Holeindre, Roger; Marsal, Marcel (1979). Hanoï : combats pour un empire. Paris: Éditions Jacques Grancher. OCLC 373540022.
- Holeindre, Roger (1981). Le rire du cosaque. Paris: Robert Laffont. ISBN 9782221006801. OCLC 417426887.
- Holeindre, Roger (1983). L'Asie en marche. Paris: Robert Laffont. ISBN 9782221009543. OCLC 726267838.
- Holeindre, Roger (1987). Aux larmes, citoyens!. Paris: Robert Laffont. ISBN 9782221053065. OCLC 781898604.
- Holeindre, Roger (1989). À tous ceux qui n'ont rien compris. Paris: Robert Laffont. ISBN 9782221058886. OCLC 20949798.
- Holeindre, Roger (1990). Le commando. Paris: Camelot. ISBN 9782878980011. OCLC 33418369.
- Holeindre, Roger (1990). Derrière mes barreaux. Paris: Editions Albatros. OCLC 25853652.
- Bariller, Damien; Holeindre, Roger (1992). S.O.S. hystérie. Paris: Editions nationales. ISBN 9782909178103. OCLC 34883902.
- Holeindre, Roger; Sanders, Alain (1997). Des Pavillons noirs à Diên Biên Phu. Limoges: Éditions Flanant. ISBN 9782911349034. OCLC 490360774.
- Holeindre, Roger (1999). Torture, ils ont dit torture ? Algérie, Vietnam, Cambodge... demain la France ?. Paris: Cercle National des Combattants.
- Holeindre, Roger (2000). Halte au révisionnisme ! : Des enfants de Goebbels et du KGB. Paris: Éditions Godefroy de Bouillon. ISBN 9782841911042. OCLC 237384940.
- Arnaud, Gilles; Holeindre, Roger; Weber, Nicolas (2003). S.O.S. hystérie II. Paris: Éditions Godefroy de Bouillon. ISBN 9782841911561.
- Holeindre, Roger (2004). L'imposture Viet-Minh. Pont-Authou: Les Éditions d'Héligoland. ISBN 9782952312806.
- Holeindre, Roger (2005). Algérie : Imposture mensonges et trahisons. Paris: Cercle National des Combattants.
- Holeindre, Roger (2005). La Guerre psychologique ou les nouveaux collabos. Pont-Authou: Les Éditions d'Héligoland. ISBN 9782952312813.
- Holeindre, Roger (2007). Moyen-Orient : Cent ans de mensonges. Pont-Authou: Les Editions d'Héligoland. ISBN 9782952312820. OCLC 159955587.
- Holeindre, Roger (2008). Trahisons sur commande : Histoire du parti communiste français. Pont-Authou: Les Editions d'Héligoland. ISBN 9782952312837. OCLC 944231510.
- Holeindre, Roger (2009). L'homme qui faisait se battre les Français entre eux : histoire du Gaullisme. Pont-Authou: Les Editions d'Héligoland. ISBN 9782952312868.
- Holeindre, Roger; Sanders, Alain (2010). Ce qu'on ne vous a jamais dit sur Katyn. La Chaussée-d'Ivry: Atelier Fol'fer. ISBN 9782357910225.
- Holeindre, Roger (2013). C'était des hommes : histoire vraie de la guerre d'Indochine. Pont-Authou: Les Éditions d'Héligoland. ISBN 9782914874939. OCLC 866823745.
- Holeindre, Roger (2015). Que Dieu sauve la France !. Pont-Authou: Les Editions d'Héligoland. ISBN 9782366110005. OCLC 944229724.
- Holeindre, Roger (2015). 1935-2015, 80 ans de mensonges et de calomnies : ça suffit!. Pont-Authou: Les Éditions d'Héligoland. ISBN 9782366110081. OCLC 946662448.
- Holeindre, Roger (2016). La Réconciliation Nationale : Lettre ouverte aux français musulmans. Paris: Éditions Apopsix. ISBN 9782359791280.

== Sources ==
- Erwan Lecoeur, Dictionnaire de l'extrême-droite, Larousse 2007, ISBN 978-2-03-582622-0
