= François d'Orcival =

French conservative journalist and essayist

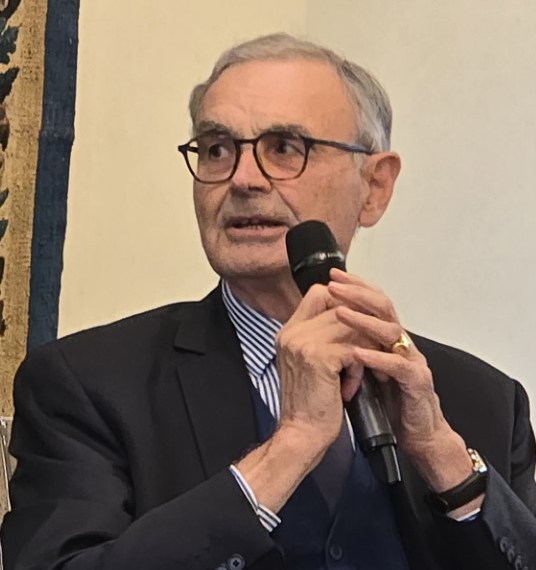
- François d'Orcival during the conferences of the Fondation Dosne-Thiers during European Heritage Days 2024
- Born: Amaury de Chaunac-Lanzac; 11 February 1942 (age 84); Aurignac, Haute-Garonne
- Occupation: Journalist

Amaury de Chaunac-Lanzac (French pronunciation: [amoʁi də ʃonak lɑ̃zak]; born 11 February 1942), better known as François d'Orcival ([fʁɑ̃swa dɔʁsival]), is a French conservative journalist and essayist. He is the president of the editorial committee at Valeurs Actuelles and sits on the board of directors of the publisher Valmonde.

== Biography ==
Amaury de Chaunac-Lanzac was born on 11 February 1942 in Aurignac, Haute-Garonne. Aged 18, he joined the neo-fascist movement Jeune Nation. Early in his political involvement, he took the pseudonym François d'Orcival. In 1960, he was one of the founding members of the Fédération des étudiants nationalistes (FEN). He supported the Organisation armée secrète and was arrested in 1962, then jailed for four weeks. D'Orcival was editor-in-chief of the FEN magazine, Les Cahiers universitaires, from 1961 to 1967. Between 1963 and 1966, he also wrote for the far-right magazines Défense de l’Occident, led by Maurice Bardèche, and Europe-Action, edited by Dominique Venner and Alain de Benoist.

In July 1966, d'Orcival joined Valeurs Actuelles, then Le Spectacle du Monde, both edited by Raymond Bourgine. He also wrote for Le Nouveau Journal. Meanwhile, he was involved in the creation of the Nationalist Movement of Progress (MNP). d'Orcival joined Valeurs Actuelles again in 1968, then co-founded with GRECE members the magazine Nouvelle École in 1970. d'Orcival remained a member of Nouvelle École's editorial board until 1976. The following year, he became the editor-in-chief of Valeurs Actuelles and was involved with Louis Pauwels in the creation of Le Figaro Magazine in 1977–1978. From 1984, d'Orcival served as the director of publication at Valeurs Actuelles.

In 1998, he was elected president of the Syndicat Professionnel de la Presse Magazine et d'Opinion (SPPMO), an organization which includes – besides Valeurs Actuelles – Le Nouvel Observateur, Le Canard enchaîné, Télérama or L’Humanité hebdo. In 2004, he was elected president of the Fédération Nationale de la Presse Française (FNPF). From 2006, d'Orcival has also worked as an editorialist at Le Figaro Magazine.

On June 23, 2008, d'Orcival was inducted into the Académie des Sciences Morales et Politiques, following the death of Henri Amouroux.

== Bibliography ==
- Le Courage est leur patrie (1965, with Alain de Benoist)
- Rhodésie, pays des lions fidèles (1966, with Fabrice Laroche)
- Le Danube était noir - la cause de la Slovaquie indépendante (1968)
- Les Marines : scènes de la vie et des combats du corps des Marines des États-Unis (1971)
- Histoire de la Gestapo (1973, with Fabrice Laroche, Jean Mabire and André Brissaud)
- Les Marines à Khé Sanh (1968, with Jacques-François de Chaunac)
- Le Roman de l'Elysée (2007)
- L'Elysée fantôme : Les années noires (2011)
- Le nouveau roman de l'Élysée (2012)
- Histoires de l'Élysée (2017)
