= William Abitbol =

French politician (1949–2016)

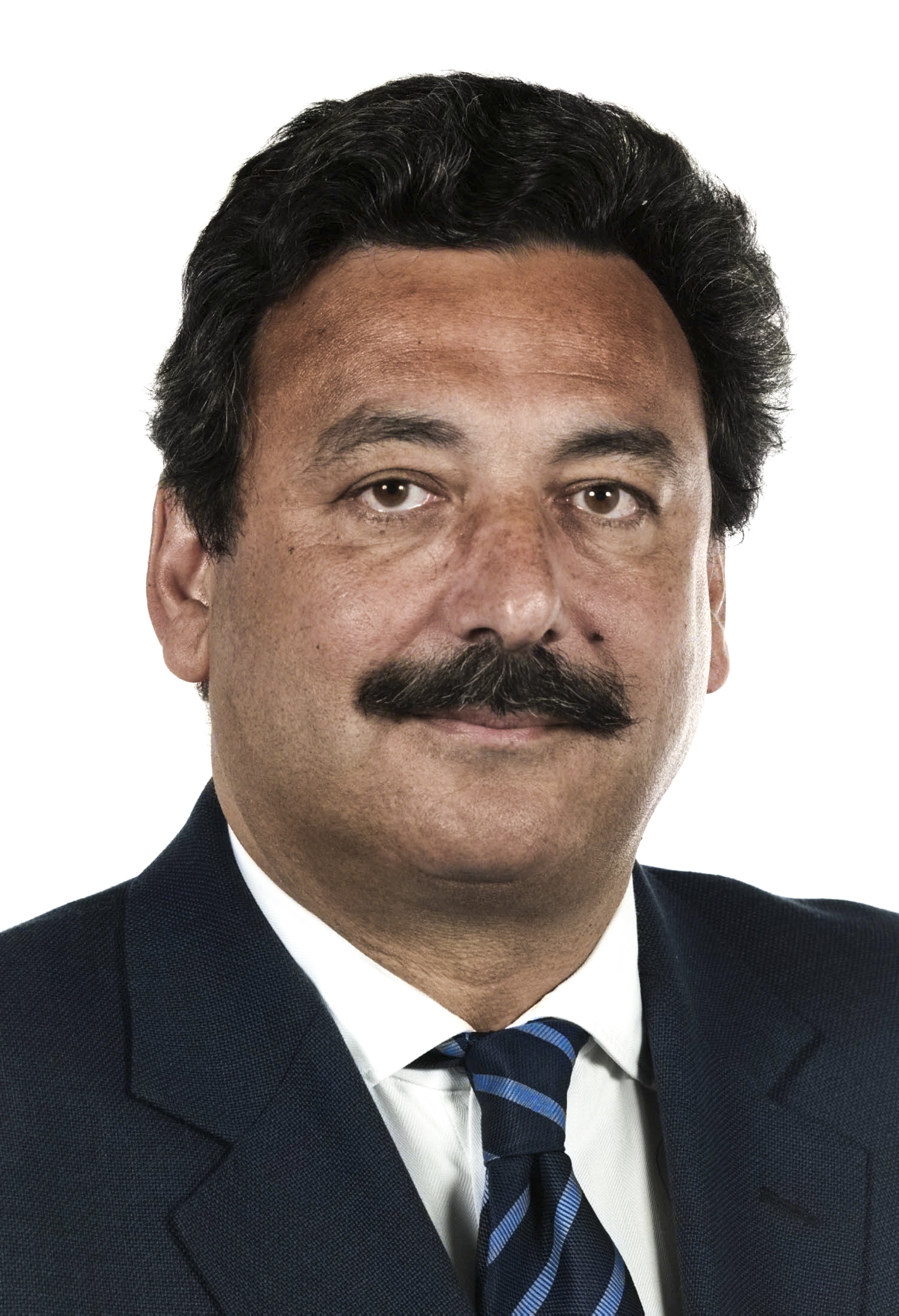
- Abitbol in 1999

Member of the European Parliament for France
- In office 20 July 1999 – 20 July 2004

Personal details
- Born: 6 September 1949 Paris, France
- Died: 22 December 2016 (aged 67)
- Resting place: Montparnasse Cemetery
- Party: Rally for France
- Occupation: Politician, restaurateur

William Abitbol (6 September 1949 – 22 December 2016) was a French politician and, in later life, a restaurateur. His father was a Tunisian Jew. He was a member of the far-right militant group "Occident" as a young man. He started his career as an advisor to Charles Pasqua. He served as a member of the European Parliament from 1999 to 2004. He was a member of the Rally for France. As of 2009, he was the owner of Chez Alfred, a French restaurant in Paris. He died of cancer on 22 December 2016 and he was buried at the Montparnasse Cemetery.
