= Rassemblement National Français =

Defunct French far-right party

French National Rally Rassemblement National Français
- Abbreviation: RNF
- Founder: Jean-Louis Tixier-Vignancour; Maurice Bardèche
- Founded: May 20, 1954
- Dissolved: 1957
- Split from: Jeune Nation
- Ideology: Neo-fascism; French nationalism
- Political position: Far-right

Rassemblement National Français (RNF) (French, 'French National Rally') was a French far-right party active between 1954 and 1957.

Rassemblement National Français was founded on 20 May 1954 by Jean-Louis Tixier-Vignancour and Maurice Bardèche, with the project of "[bringing] together all French people who wish to defend and propagate the ideas of national recovery, social reform and reconciliation among French people." It presented candidates in the 1956 French legislative election, resulting in the election of Tixier-Vignancour.

== Bibliography ==
- Barnes, Ian R. (2002). "I am a Fascist Writer: Maurice Bardèche–Ideologist and Defender of French Fascism". The European Legacy. 7 (2): 195–209. doi:10.1080/10848770220119659. ISSN 1084-8770. S2CID 144988319.
- De Boissieu, Laurent (2019). "Rassemblement National Français (RNF)". France-politique. ISSN 1765-2898.
- Gautier, Jean-Paul (2017). Les extrêmes droites en France: De 1945 à nos jours (in French). Syllepse. ISBN 9782849505700.
