= La Nouvelle Revue d'Histoire =

French history magazine

- Editor-in-chief: Gilles Mancheron
- Categories: History
- Frequency: Bimonthly
- First issue: 1 July 2002; 23 years ago
- Final issue: 2017; 9 years ago
- Company: SARL Histoire et Mémoire
- Country: France
- Based in: Paris
- Language: French
- Website: www.la-nrh.fr
- ISSN: 1764-2019

La Nouvelle Revue d'histoire was a bimonthly French history magazine that was published between 2002 and 2017.

== History and profile ==
La Nouvelle Revue d'histoire was established in July 2002 by Dominique Venner. The magazine has a right-wing political stance. Venner served as one of the editors of the magazine until 21 May 2013 when he committed suicide inside the cathedral of Notre-Dame de Paris.

Gilles Mancheron was the editor-in-chief of the magazine.

The last issue was released in 2017. The same year, the editing company was closed down.
