= Occident (movement) =

French nationalist movement

- Celtic cross
- Founded: April 1964; 62 years ago
- Dissolved: October 31, 1968; 57 years ago
- Country: France
- Ideology: French nationalism Revolutionary nationalism Neo-fascism; Corporatism; Anti-communism; Anti-capitalism; Third Position
- Political position: Far-right
- Size: 1,500 (1968)

Occident was a French far-right militant group, active in France between 1964 and 1968 and considered the "main activist group on the extreme right in the 1960s". Occident activists were known for their "commando" actions against various "enemy" targets, such as left-wing students, PCF offices, immigrant associations, and anti-colonialists. A number of former Occident members later became prominent figures in mainstream right-wing parties; some even obtained ministerial positions. The movement was banned by the French authorities in October 1968, following violent confrontations with left-wing groups during the May 1968 events.

== History ==
Occident was founded in April 1964 by Pierre Sidos and dissidents from the Parisian section of the Federation of Nationalist Students (FEN), following their defection from the white nationalist movement Europe-Action (1963–66), led by Dominique Venner. At the outset, Occident appeared as a remake of Jeune Nation, an older neo-fascist group Sidos had created back in 1949, and disbanded by the authorities in 1958. Occident similarly used the Celtic Cross as their emblem, and violent activism played a significant part in their political agenda.

On January 12, 1967, a group of Occident members attacked the Vietnam committees on the campus of the University of Rouen. About 20 members of Occident were arrested, including Gérard Longuet, Alain Madelin and Patrick Devedjian (all future right-wing ministers). Suspicions arose in the group that someone had tipped off the police. Patrick Devedjian, summoned for an alleged meeting, was brutally interrogated by fellow members, including waterboarding in a bathtub. Devedjian escaped in the nude.

In January 1968, Roger Holeindre (future vice-President of the National Front) founded the Front uni de soutien au Sud-Viêt-Nam (United Front in Support of South Vietnam) which supported the US war effort. Occident actively participated in this Front.

Following violent confrontations during the May 1968 turmoils, Occident was termed an illegal violent group and dissolved by the administration of Charles de Gaulle on 31 October 1968 by application of the 1936 law on combat groups and private militias.

== Views ==
The Vietnam War had replaced the Algerian War as the battleground of the far right against communist expansionism. Occident proclaimed itself "a violent movement and proud of it", active to "defend the West wherever it fights".

Building on a "rudimentary fusion of nationalism, neo-fascism and social Darwinism", Occident was strongly anti-communist and anti-liberal. They called for the establishment of a corporatist economic regime and promoted the overthrow of "the Masonic and plutocratic republic", through a "second French Revolution that [would] sweep away the pernicious effects of the first". Occident advocated for a "new race" of leaders who would emerge from the "nationalist ranks", not through the "myth of election" but via the "selection of the best elements from the entire nation".

== Notable members ==
Prominent former members include:

- Patrick Devedjian — minister
- Alain Madelin — minister
- Gérard Longuet — minister
- Claude Goasguen — member of French parliament
- Hervé Novelli — member of French parliament
- Pierre Sidos — founder of L'Œuvre Française
- William Abitbol —member of European parliament
- Jean-Jacques Guillet — member of French parliament
- François d'Orcival — member of the editorial committee at Valeurs Actuelles
- Jacques Bompard — founding member of the National Front
- Dominique Venner — founder of Europe-Action
- François Duprat — founding member of the National Front
- Jean-Gilles Malliarakis
- Marie-France Stirbois
- Bernard Antony
- Pierre Vial

== Bibliography ==
- Charpier, Frédéric (2005). Génération Occident. Le Seuil. ISBN 978-2020614139.
- Shields, J.G. (2007). The Extreme Right in France. Taylor & Francis. ISBN 978-0-415-09755-0.

== See also ==
- Organisation armée secrète (OAS, the French terrorist group against the independence of Algeria)
