= Revue d'histoire du fascisme =

French neo-fascist magazine

- Cover of the first May 1972 issue
- Frequency: Quarterly
- First issue: 1972
- Final issue: 1977
- Country: France
- Based in: Paris, France
- Language: French

Revue d'histoire du fascisme (transl. Journal of the History of Fascism) was a neo-fascist magazine established by François Duprat and published between 1972 and 1977.

The quarterly magazine was launched in May 1972 by Duprat. Soon after, it sought to rehabilitate the pre-WWII fascist movements via the study of fascism by lenient authors. Maurice Bardèche published articles in the magazine.

In a 1976 issue, Duprat reproached the Vichy regime for the nomination of Xavier Vallat, who was deemed "too moderate", as the head of the Commissariat-General for Jewish Affairs.

Duprat saw history as a political weapon, stating in May 1976:

We must not let to our opponents, Marxists and régimistes, (Note: This is a neologism which alludes to legalistic supporters of the "political regime" of the Republic.) the monopoly of the historical representation of men, facts and ideas. Because History is a wonderful war instrument, and it would be useless to deny that one of the important reasons of our political hardships resides in the historical exploitation and the systematic deformation of the nationalist experiences of the past... It is in order to answer these needs... that a team of intellectuals, professors and nationalists have created the Revue d'histoire du fascisme."
