= Jean Dides =

French politician

- Born: 5 August 1915; Paris, France
- Died: 2 April 2004; Paris, France
- Known for: Police Commissioner, Member of General Intelligence (RG), Politician
- Police career
- Police service: French National Police
- Allegiance: France
- Department: General Intelligence (RG)
- Service years: 1940 - 1954 (Police)
- Other work: Member of the French Poujadist council, Member of Parliament

Jean Dides (5 August 1915, Paris – 2 April 2004, Paris) was a police commissioner and member of General Intelligence (RG) under the government Mendes France, French Poujadist councilor and MP.

He was in charge of the fifth section of RG whose mission was to hunt foreign Resistance under the Vichy regime. After the liberation he joined the anti-communist struggle, becoming the main assistant in the mission of the police prefect of Paris Jean Baylot. Dismissed from his commissioner following the "leak case" of 1954, destabilizing the Interior Minister Francois Mitterrand considered too favorable to decolonization, he was elected in January 1956 under the banner of the Union French and brotherhood. Jean Dides however, retains its influence in the police, especially during the crisis of May 1958.

== Vichy regime and after war ==
Jean Dides engages as a police officer in 1940. Two years later, he was appointed by Lucien Rottée, director of RG (shot at the Liberation), Senior Inspector RG to the 5th section, responsible in particular for the repression of anti-Nazi foreign resistance. Dides has been following Nazi "new order" for four year. Then he creates, an association with 5,000 police officers : "Association of Distant Administration" in 1946. Three years later, they created the" friendly Association of defense of the professional interests of officers of the municipal police", made up of 2200 police officers of the Prefecture of Police purged in 1944–45 as traitors. This association is headed by Dides, who himself has been suspended for a few weeks, by a committee chaired by his own former Chief Inspector at the 5th section, Migeon.

He became a member of the Gaullist RPF in 1947, and converts in the surveillance and repression of communists, that become the main enemy. Dides writes an internal brochure RPF, where one can read: "We want to consider the PCF as a national danger, it must be destroyed. We want the breakup of its unit, its resources, and if necessary its leaders. " CGT-Police is then purified by the Socialist Interior Minister Jules Moch: 800 police officers accused of sympathizing with the PCF are revoked, and 2200 mutated.
