= Federation of Nationalist Students =

French far-right student organization

- Fédération des Étudiants Nationalistes
- Abbreviation: FEN
- Predecessor: Jeune Nation
- Formation: May 1, 1960
- Founder: François d'Orcival and others
- Dissolved: 1967
- Members: 2,500 (1965)

The Federation of Nationalist Students (French: Fédération des Étudiants Nationalistes, FEN) was a French far-right student society active between 1960 and 1967, founded by François d'Orcival and others, soon joined by Alain de Benoist as a lead journalist.

Created by former students of the neo-fascist group Jeune Nation (1949–58), the Federation of Nationalists Students was launched in May 1960 after the publication of a manifesto calling for a nationalist cultural revolution. The text broke with the doctrine of street insurrection previously espoused by far-right groups like Jeune Nation in the 1950s, and is deemed influential on many nationalist movements that followed, especially Europe-Action and the GRECE. The organization reached its peak in influence and membership in the years 1964-1966, and was eventually dissolved by its head members in 1967.

== Emergence and creation: 1959-61 ==
The Federation of Nationalist Students (FEN) was established on 1 May 1960 by pro-colonial Algeria students Georges Schmeltz (known as "Pierre Marcenet"), Pierre Poichet and François d'Orcival, as a successor of the far-right group Jeune Nation, dissolved by official decree during the May 1958 crisis. The magazine Jeune Nation—created in July 1958 as an attempt to revive the defunct group, and joined in September 1959 by D'Orcival, Poichet and Marcenet—had been shut down by the police on 28 January 1960. To avoid a new dissolution, the young militants infiltrated the far-left student society UNEF, then seceded from the organization to create the FEN.

The founders published a Manifesto of the Class of '60, in reference to Robert Brasillach's Letter to a Soldier of the Class of '60, in which they committed themselves to "action of profound consequence", as opposed to "sterile activism." For the FEN, the "ideological war" was not to be fought in the streets, but rather in "the biology laboratories, the archives of the National Library [and] the editorial rooms of the mainstream press". Far-right movements had to generate a cultural revolution, by promoting nationalist ideas until they reach political dominance and popular support, "[wearing] on the outside reassuring labels acceptable to the system, in order not to arouse attention before [their] war machine is sufficiently strong". This manifesto marked a break with the street insurrection previously promoted by Jeune Nation, and set the ground for the future meta-political strategy of Europe-Action and the GRECE. That stance however did not keep the FEN away from attacking UNEF meetings and confront the police in Algeria during Charles de Gaulle's tour.

Alain de Benoist joined the FEN in 1961 and the following year became the secretary of the student society's magazine, Cahiers universitaires, in which he wrote the main articles along with D'Orcival. François Duprat, who had participated in the split from UNEF in 1960, was also a journalist in the magazine.

== Political influence: 1962-66 ==
Soon after having served his sentence at La Santé Prison in 1961-62, Dominique Venner undertook the takeover of the student society, which had been acting until then as the semi-avowed successor of the banned Jeune Nation.

The organization had started to grow after the signature of the Évian accords in March 1962 and, despite their pro-colonial stance, the FEN began to accept the new world order emerging from decolonization. They theorized a nationalism based on European identity, founded on "the defense of European pre-eminence" everywhere in the world, with France as a "privileged territory" where "the main racial branches that make up European ethnicity converge". They dismissed the political and military leaders as unable to pursue the revolution triggered in the streets: "Alger, it is over; forgotten. We will not say Alger as we say Budapest anymore."

In October 1963, the Cahiers Universitaires demanded the suppression of the military service in the name of the fight against the Fifth Republic: "serving in the army, that is serving in the army of the regime. [...] Not a single soldier for the regime." This anti-military public campaign turned into a failure and led to internal disputes in the FEN. A dissident Parisian branch emerged in November 1963 after the exclusion of François Duprat. Endorsed by Pierre Sidos and escorted by Jeune Europe's supporters, this break-away group created Occident on 23 April 1964. Sidos also opposed the influence of Europe-Action in the FEN, along with their theories of pan-European nationalism—Sidos preferring a French-centered one—and their supposed leniency towards communism.

The FEN reached its peak in the years 1964–1966, with an estimated membership of 2,500 in 1965. After they supported far-right candidate Jean-Louis Tixier-Vignancour in the 1965 presidential election through the "Tixier-Vignancour Committees", FEN lead members were among the founders—along with Europe-Action magazine led by Dominique Venner—of the short-lived European Rally for Liberty (REL), a nationalist micro-party which ran candidates in the 1967 legislative election but failed with 2.58% of the votes. The electoral failure led many like De Benoist to question their political involvement. According to him, he decided in the fall of 1967 “to make a permanent and complete break with political action” and to launch a review. Maurice Rollet also gives November 1967 as the moment several FEN veterans decided to “change course, radically”.

== End and legacy: 1967 ==
The Cahiers universitaires released their last issue in January 1967. If the FEN never succeeded in forming a lasting and in reaching majority approval among students—UNEF remaining the main union—the period was a "significant tactical moment" for the nationalists. After the FEN auto-dissolved in 1967, many of its members were involved in the foundation of the GRECE in 1968—escorted by adherents of the REL—all led in this project by De Benoist. Ideas promoted by the FEN, especially its meta-political ambition expressed in the founding manifesto, influenced Europe-Action (1963–66) and the Nouvelle Droite (1968–present). De Benoist has been a lead member in all three organizations.

Raymond Bourgine offered positions to a number of FEN adherents in his magazines Valeurs Actuelles and Le Spectacle du Monde, most notably to Alain de Benoist (from 1970 to 1982), and François d'Orcival (1966–present).

== Views and symbols ==
FEN members intended to "fight Marxization in the universities", to keep "French Algeria territorially bound to the Mother Country" and to establish a "rigorously hierarchical [state] not on election but on selection", with the governing elites necessarily of "European ethnicity". According to the FEN, the events occurring in Algeria were a manifestation of "the revolt of colored peoples against the order assured by the imperial sovereignty of white civilization".

Leading FEN members, especially D'Orcival, were largely influenced by the meta-politic and agitprop methods of Marxism they intended to use against the very same Marxists. As such, the reading of "Left-Wing" Communism: An Infantile Disorder by Lenin was advised to nationalist militants for them to "understand how a revolutionary party must behave for the seizure of power."

The emblem of the FEN was a black Spartan helmet with a red flame.

== Notable members ==
- François d'Orcival — member of the editorial committee at Valeurs Actuelles
- Alain de Benoist — leader of the Nouvelle Droite
- François Duprat — founding member of the Front National
- Gérard Longuet — member of parliament, senator, several times Minister
- Alain Madelin — member of parliament, several times Minister

== See also ==
- Jeune Nation
- Europe-Action and the European Rally for Liberty
- GRECE
- Occident and Groupe Union Défense
