= Pierre Sidos =

French nationalist activist (1927–2020)

- Born: 6 January 1927; Saint-Pierre-d'Oléron, Nouvelle-Aquitaine, France
- Died: 4 September 2020 (aged 93); Bayeux, France
- Movement: Mouvement Franciste (1943–45); Jeune Nation (1949–58); Parti Nationaliste (1958–59); Occident (1964–65); L'Œuvre Française (1968–2013)
- Parent(s): François Sidos; Louise Rocchi

Pierre Sidos (6 January 1927 – 4 September 2020) was a French far right nationalist, neo-Pétainist, and antisemitic activist. One of the main figures of post-WWII nationalism in France, Sidos was the founder and leader of the nationalist organizations Jeune Nation (1949–1958) and L'Œuvre Française (1968–2013).

Sidos was convicted in 1946 of joining the fascist Mouvement Franciste at 16 years old in the midst of WWII and Nazi occupation of France. After spending two years of internment in Natzweiler-Struthof, he founded in 1949 Jeune Nation, the most prominent French neo-fascist movement of the 1950s. Famous for its insurrectional violence during the Algerian war, the organization was dissolved by official decree in 1958.

Convicted a second time in 1963 of "recreating a disbanded league" and "compromising State security", Sidos founded Occident the following year, but soon broke with the group. He eventually established another Vichyist movement in 1968, L'Œuvre Française, of which he was the leader until he stepped down in 2012. The movement was banned a year later, making it the fourth association founded by Sidos to be dissolved by the French authorities, and the fifth he had been part of, in a 70-year period of political activism.

== Early life and WWII ==
=== Family: 1927–1938 ===
Pierre Sidos was born on 6 January 1927 in Saint-Pierre-d'Oléron, the son of François Sidos (1891–1946) and Louise Rocchi. He grew up in a familial background strongly tainted with nationalism and far-right ideologies. As a child, he had fun recreating the March on Rome in the family house staircase with his brother Jean, later killed in action by the German forces in 1940. Pierre Sidos has asserted that the death of his brother was the event that made him swing into political action.

His father, a Catholic and anti-republican right-winger, had been a member of the Jeunesses Patriotes, a far-right league dissolved in 1936. Born in Mouzaïaville (then in French Algeria) and serving in the colonial army, he had traveled across the French empire where he met his wife Louise. A First World War hero, François Sidos eventually collaborated with the Vichy regime during WWII. His mother Louise was of Corsican descent and his grandfather, Jean Rocchi, a fervent Bonapartist and friend of Pierre Taittinger, future leader of the Jeunesses Patriotes.

=== Collaboration and internment: 1939–1948 ===
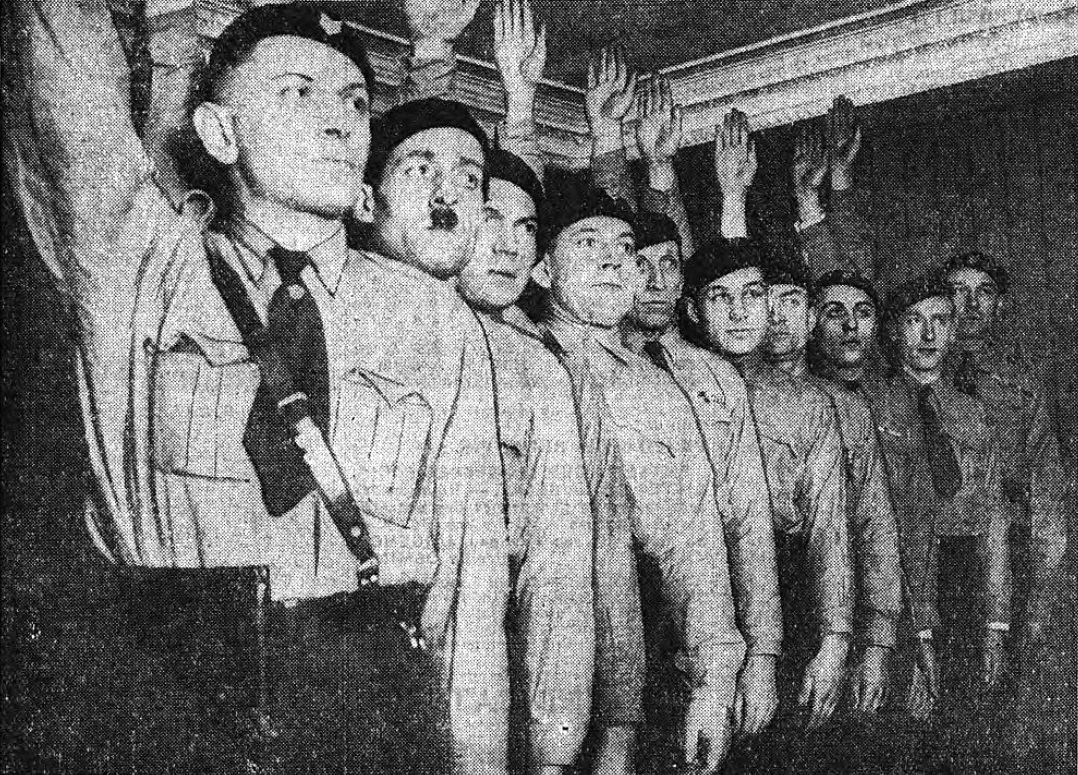
Pierre Sidos joined in 1943 the youth movement of the Parti Franciste. (1934)

In 1943, then 16 years old (the minimum required age), Pierre Sidos joined the youth movement of the Parti Franciste, one of the main collaborationist movements under the Vichy regime. In January 1946, he was tried by a court in La Rochelle—along with his father, mother and his brother Jacques—convicted and received a 5-year jail sentence for his membership in the Parti Franciste. The conviction was reduced as Sidos was still a minor at the time of the events. His father François was sentenced to death, guilty of unlawful arrests of resisters organized with the Milice, and of his participation in the armed conflict with the Nazi forces against the Allies. Before his execution on 28 March 1946, François wrote a letter to his sons, urging them to avenge his "unjust death".

His brother Jacques was sentenced to 10 years in jail for his past in the Vichy intelligence services, his mother released with all charges dropped, and Pierre was sent in autumn 1946 to the Natzweiler-Struthof concentration camp in Alsace. The place, originally built by the Nazis in 1941, had been recently transformed by the French authorities to include elementary needs, such as central heating or electric lighting. The inmates—most of them former Nazi-collaborators—could even organize free-fights, running competitions or put on a play.

While serving his sentence, Pierre Sidos spent most of his time reading and running. He met Marcel Bibé, a former Bezen Perrot militant who initiated him in Celtic esoterism. Sidos then began to write about druidism and the Celtic Cross, which he described in his prison notes as the allegory of the "walking sun and universal life", a symbol he would later use in all the organizations he created: Jeune Nation, Occident and L'Œuvre Française.

In 1948, the French authorities made an offer to the inmates: their release against an enlistment in the Indochina War. Sidos refused the proposition, while hundreds of former Nazi collaborators were sent to fight within the French army in southeast Asia, diffusing Wehrmacht and SS songs they had learnt during their internment in Natzweiler-Struthof.

== Jeune Nation ==
=== Leader: 1949–1958 ===
Sidos nonetheless benefited from an early release on 4 August 1948. He quickly found a job and contacted another of his brothers, François. The latter, unlike most of the family, had joined the Free French Forces in 1942 and participated in Operation Dragoon along with the Allies in the summer of 1944. They were joined by their brother Jacques following his own release, and together they prepared the ground for the creation of Jeune Nation.

The Celtic Cross, symbol of all the movements Sidos founded from Jeune Nation (1949-58) to L'Œuvre Française (1968-2013).

By 1949, the final structure of the organization had been designed and the group ready to be launched, but the Sidos brothers lacked money as far-right financial sponsors were not abundant in the immediate post-war. Pierre Sidos then decided to reach out to Jeanne Pajot, the wife of a rich industrialist. A Bonapartist and friend of Pierre Taittinger like his grandfather, she agreed to fund them and "La Jeune Nation"—as it was initially called—held its first presentation on 22 October 1949. Publicly unknown for several years, the movement experienced a sudden fame and a rise in membership after the return of military personnel from south-east Asia following the end of the First Indochina War on 20 July 1954.

Labeling themselves the "successors of those of 1934" and targeting young people in their recruitment, Jeune Nation was joined in 1956 by Dominique Venner, then 21, who would later oppose Sidos and mark a shift between his euro-nationalist doctrine and the "nostalgic neo-Petainists of Pierre Sidos." Although they were largely inspired by the ideologies of fascist Italy and Vichy France, Jeune Nation began to break with the collaborationist circles that had been protecting them since Sidos' prison time. As Gaullists and former resisters were joining their ranks during the Algerian war, Sidos furthermore banned any evocation of the period 1933–1945 among its militants, with only a few events like the commemorations of Robert Brasillach or 6 February 1934 allowed to take place.

The group was particularly known for their violent street attacks, especially on communists. On 9–10 October 1954, a commando raid led by Sidos carjacked a van transporting issues of the communist newspaper L’Humanité Dimanche, then destroyed them and assaulted the driver who died a few months later as a result of his injuries. Jeune Nation was dissolved on 15 May 1958 by an official decree of Jules Moch, then Minister of the Interior, two days after the putsch of Algiers and the beginning of the May 1958 crisis. The group had been suspected of a bomb attack that occurred on 6 February 1958 in the National Assembly.

=== Escape and arrest: 1959–1962 ===
The association was regardless declared again under a new name to the prefecture of police on 7 October 1958, and officially recreated by Pierre Sidos and Dominique Venner during a congress on 6–8 February 1959 as "Parti Nationaliste". The new organization was dissolved only four days later, on 12 February 1959, and an arrest warrant was issued on 24 January 1960 for "recreating a disbanded league" and "compromising State security".

From January 1960, Sidos lived in clandestinity in a house of Neuilly, in the western suburbs of Paris. He stayed in contact with putschist generals and pro-colonial politicians like Jean-Marie Le Pen, and was eventually arrested on 13 July 1962. Sidos was released on 19 June 1963 following his trial, and sentenced to a suspended 3-year jail sentence and a 2,000 Franc fine.

== L'Œuvre Française ==
=== Transition: 1963–1967 ===
Jeune Nation was regenerated by young former members of the movement after the launch of the Federation of Nationalist Students (FEN) in 1960. Sidos initially supported the project but eventually dismissed the influence of Dominique Venner on the association, as well as their neo-pagan and euro-nationalist leanings. Together with other activists opposed to the FEN, Sidos decided to found Occident in 1964. During the presidential campaign of far-right candidate Jean-Louis Tixier-Vignancour, Occident was largely involved in the grassroots movement Comité Jeunes ("Youth Committee"), which quickly attracted several hundred members. Following a dispute between Sidos and Jean-Marie Le Pen, then Tixier-Vignancour's campaign director, Sidos' group was replaced with Dominique Venner's Europe-Action Volunteers. Sidos eventually broke with Occident in 1965–1966.

In February 1966, he created with André Cantelaube the magazine Le Soleil ("The Sun"), which later became the official organ of L'Œuvre Française from 1968 until it was banned from publicity and sales to minors in 1990 following the Gayssot Act, then replaced by a resurrected Jeune Nation in 1994. Sidos was labeled the "bard of antisemitism" by historian Pierre Milza, and Le Soleil defended a form of anti-capitalist nationalism that denounced the role of Jews in finance, politics and the industries, as well as the "threat" represented by the state of Israel in geopolitics.

=== Leader: 1968–2012 ===
Sidos set up L'Œuvre Française in 1968 and declared himself "presidor for life" (French: présideur, a portmanteau of président and dictateur). Closer to Francoist Spain and the Portuguese Estado Novo than fascist regimes, L'Œuvre Française was antisemitic, neo-Pétainist and nationalist. Sidos then seemed to endorse a blend of Catholicism, pan-European nationalism and anti-Semitism, with some Third Position influence, as his ideology of choice. Designed as a cult of personality, the organization was labeled a sect or "Church of Sidology" by critics even at the far right, while its adherents highlighted the discipline and determination allowed by their organizational style.

He attempted to run in the 1969 French presidential election on this platform, seeking to stand as a nationalist and anti-Zionist candidate, but his candidacy was rejected by the Constitutional Council on a technical basis. It has been argued that there was a fear any judgement in Sidos' favour would have been considered a vindication of his collaborationist background in wider society. Le Soleil, organ of L'Œuvre Française, dismissed the Jewish origin of some members in the council, namely Gaston Palewski and René Cassin, as the reason for their refusal. In 1973, Sidos was the only candidate for L'Œuvre in the legislative election. Sidos was said to have met António Salazar for a short encounter in the 1960s, king Faisal of Saudi Arabia for a one-hour meeting on 28 April 1971 in Riyadh, as well as Juan Perón on 22 October of the following year in Madrid, and former SS colonel Otto Skorzeny in the same city. According to Sidos, Perón declared to him that "Paris [had] been the world capital of subversion since 1789."

By the 1980s he had come to moderate his own position and sought to build a wider alliance with other fringe right-wing movements, including monarchists, integrists and the supporters of Marcel Lefebvre. To this end he joined François Brigneau, Pierre Pujo and Jean Madiran in a commemoration service for the tenth anniversary of the occupation of Saint-Nicolas-du-Chardonnet by the Society of St. Pius X in 1987. Sidos subsequently sought co-operation with the Front National (FN) although at other times he would dismiss the party as too moderate. In 1996, he announced the rallying of L'Œuvre to the party, despite the opposition of his right hand man Yvan Benedetti.

After negotiations with Sidos, Jean-Marie Le Pen eventually allowed some L'Œuvre militants to integrate the FN in 2007. The party however later tightened its policy regarding the association, Marine Le Pen denouncing an "operation of entryism" to facilitate the seizure of power by her rival Bruno Gollnisch in the FN. Following Jean-Marie Le Pen's departure from the leadership in 2011, replaced by his daughter Marine, Sidos severed all ties with the party, telling far-right newspaper Rivarol that he did not feel a woman should have such an important position.

In 2012, at 85, he left the presidency of L'Œuvre Française, succeeded by Yvan Benedetti.

== Late life: 2013–2020 ==
In 2013, the association he had founded 45 years earlier was dissolved by the authorities. Manuel Valls, then Minister of the Interior, denounced L'Œuvre Française as a group "spreading a xenophobic and antisemitic ideology, diffusing racist and Holocaust-denying thesis, exalting collaboration [with the Nazis] and the Vichy regime, paying regular tribute to Pétain, Brasillach or Maurras", adding that the movement was "organized like a private militia in paramilitary-like training camps."

On 28 November 2013, the association Les Amis de Pierre Sidos ("The Friends of Pierre Sidos") was created to "make the works of patriot Pierre Sidos and that of his family known".

He died in Bayeux hospital on 4 September 2020.

== Controversies ==
On 6 February 1990, he was invited on the TV talk-show Ciel, mon mardi !. To the question "are you an anti-Semite?" he famously answered: "no more no less than Saint-Louis", in reference to the king of France who forced Jews to wear a distinctive roundel and banned mixed marriages. Sidos further precised in 2013 that "Saint-Louis had a religious hostility but was the godfather of many Jews that converted [to Christianity]." Sidos was also fervently anti-Zionist, denouncing Israel as the "avowed metropolis of an invisible and harmful empire […] with dominant aims."

In a 2013 interview, he described Adolf Hitler as the "German Napoléon" and Benito Mussolini as "the last of the Caesars".
