= Rivarol (magazine) =

French far-right magazine

- Editor: Fabrice Jérôme Bourbon
- Former editors: Marie France Wacquez
- Circulation: 3000
- Founded: January 1951; 75 years ago
- Country: France
- Based in: Paris
- Language: French
- Website: www.rivarol.com

Rivarol is a French nationalist and far-right weekly magazine. The editor of the magazine, Fabrice Bourbon, was condemned for incitement to hatred against Jews due to his articles in the magazine.

On 8 April 2016, around 600 fans of the magazine attended a banquet in a Paris hotel, to celebrate the 65-year run of the magazine. The banquet included Jean-Marie Le Pen, Pierre Vial, Henry de Lesquen, Pierre Sidos, Yvan Benedetti, Alexandre Gabriac and Robert Faurisson.

Established in January 1951, the magazine was started as a meeting point for those who had collaborated with the Nazis or who had been active with the Vichy regime and had just been freed from prison. It was named for the counter-revolutionary writer Antoine de Rivarol. The previous editor of the magazine was Marie France Wacquez. In 1951 Rivarol bought the collaborationist magazine and "organ of resistance" against the Resistance Écrits de Paris. It was a notable voice demanding amnesty for those targeted by the Épuration légale. It was founded in 1947 by René Malliavin. Since then it been the monthly brother publication to Rivarol, sharing its editorial line.
