= Metapolitics =

Political discourse about politics itself

Metapolitics (sometimes written meta-politics) describes political attempts to speak in a metalinguistic sense about politics; that is, to have a political dialogue about politics itself. Activists who use the phrase often view metapolitics as a form of "inquiry" in which the discourse of politics, and the political itself, is reimagined and reappropriated. The term was coined by Marxists and is almost always used in the context of ideological discourse among the far-left and far-right, unlike the wider academic field of political philosophy. Those citing the term often do so in an attempt to take a "self-conscious" role in describing their preferred form of political inquiry.

== Contemporary thought ==
By ‘metapolitics’ I mean whatever consequences a philosophy is capable of drawing, both in and for itself, from real instances of politics as thought. Metapolitics is opposed to political philosophy, which claims that since no such politics exists, it falls to philosophers to think ‘the’ political.

— Alain Badiou, April 1998

The term "metapolitics" originated with left-wing French academics, being first popularized by Alain Badiou and Jacques Rancière. Discussing Badiou's Metapolitics, Bruno Bosteels asserts that:

“Badiou argues against the tradition of political philosophy, which he associates with the likes of Hannah Arendt and Claude Lefort, by proposing to think not of ‘the political’ (le politique) but of ‘politics’ (la politique) as an active form of thinking, or thought-practice, in its own right. He then goes on to evaluate the proximity of this proposal for a ‘metapolitical’ orientation to the work of his teacher Louis Althusser and his contemporaries Jacques Rancière and Sylvain Lazarus, before offering case studies on the concepts of democracy, justice and Thermidoreanism.”

=== Contemporary politics ===
GRECE has promoted the project of slowly infusing society with its ideas and rhetoric in the hope of achieving cultural dominance, which would then allow for the assumption of political power. Vial stated that "Politics is not the affair of GRECE. It is to be placed on another, more fundamental level. GRECE intends to work on the meta-political level [...] where a collective mentality and therefore a popular consensus is elaborated". De Benoist has called for the overthrow of liberal democracy through a long-term metapolitical strategy. Although it rejects liberal democracy, the Nouvelle Droite is not inherently anti-democratic, calling instead for a localised form of what it calls "organic democracy". De Benoist has maintained that the Nouvelle Droite has never endorsed a particular political party, and that its purpose has been as having "always adopted a position of observer, never of actor. It produces analyses and thought; it offers a theoretical corpus; it accomplishes intellectual and cultural work. Nothing else."

The Nouvelle Droite critiques both modernity and post-modernity. It opposes global capitalism and liberalism, and valorises regionalism, federalism, socialism and local forms of democracy. It rejects the principle of human equality, arguing that humans are not born free and equal and that society is inherently hierarchical. It stressed the need for elites, claiming that this would allow for harmonious social hierarchy in which all people are aware of their particular responsibilities and tasks.

Inspired by the French example, Italian activists were soon closely aligned. One quote from that era goes:

For this reason we chose a metapolitical strategy that, according to Gramsci's teachings, allows us to gain cultural power before political power, which does not exclude that in the near future someone could bring our cultural programs to a more political plane. Since I do not think that the same people should do the cultural and political work, and also because people have natural predispositions for one or the other, I have chosen to be a cultural operator and I have no intention of transforming myself into a political man.

Another influential quote to this effect:

Right in front of us the path of “metapolitics” became clear. That is to say, it was something that did not disregard political needs but transcended them, to comprehend them in a more vast, more complex design that implicated profound ideological revisions (without changing the vision of the world) and cultural roots [...] And certainly, talking about cinema and comic books, of politology and the sciences, of etiology and energy, of sexuality and celebration, of community and sport, of literature and art was different from evoking the past and envisioning apotheosis. The New Right is this as well, a project for taking back daily life, free time, the world of personal interests, a recognition of that which is different-from-us. Perhaps less than we believe. An admission of plurality against monomaniacal ends. A proposal not for leaving the world, but for taking it back.

== Sources ==
- Bar-On, Tamir (2001). "The Ambiguities of the Nouvelle Droite, 1968-1999". The European Legacy. 6 (3): 333–351. doi:10.1080/10848770120051349. S2CID 144359964.
- De Benoist, Alain (2014). "Alain de Benoist answers Tamar Bar-On". Journal for the Study of Radicalism. 8 (1). Translated by Christine Rhone: 141–161. doi:10.14321/jstudradi.8.1.0141. S2CID 144595116.
- Johnson, Douglas (1995). "The New Right in France". In Luciano Cheles; Ronnie Ferguson; Michalina Vaughan (eds.). The Far Right in Western and Eastern Europe (second ed.). London and New York: Longman Group. pp. 234–244. ISBN 9780582238817.
- McCulloch, Tom (2006). "The Nouvelle Droite in the 1980s and 1990s: Ideology and Entryism, the Relationship with the Front National". French Politics. 4 (2): 158–178. doi:10.1057/palgrave.fp.8200099. S2CID 144813395.
