= L'Humanité Dimanche =

Weekly newspaper supplement in France

- Categories: Political magazine
- Frequency: Weekly
- Founded: 1948
- Country: France
- Based in: Paris
- Language: French
- Website: L’Humanité Dimanche

L’Humanité Dimanche (French pronunciation: [lymanite dimɑ̃ʃ]) is a French language weekly magazine which is the supplement of l'Humanité newspaper. It has been distributed since 1948.

== History and profile ==
L’Humanité Dimanche was established in 1948. At the end of the 1990s the magazine was closed. It was relaunched on 9 March 2006. It is a Sunday supplement of l'Humanité and has a communist political stance. It was previously affiliated with the Communist Party.
