= Pierre Vial =

French academic and Identitarian activist

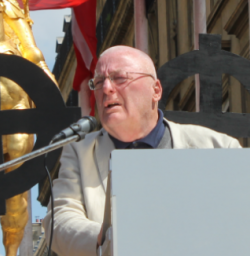
- Vial in 2012.

Member of the Regional Council of Rhône-Alpes
- In office 1992–2004

Personal details
- Born: 25 December 1942 (age 83)
- Party: FN; MNR
- Occupation: Medievalist, activist
- Known for: Neopagan ideologue, member of the French New Right

Pierre Vial (born 25 December 1942) is a French academic and politician. A medievalist historian, he taught in the Jean Moulin University Lyon 3. A Nouvelle Droite leader, he is the founder of the far-right, neopagan association Terre et Peuple and was a member of the National Front and National Republican Movement parties.

== Biography ==
Pierre Vial was born on 25 December 1942. He was in his youth a contributor in Cahiers universitaires, the magazine of the Federation of Nationalist Students.

He co-founded the Nouvelle Droite think tank GRECE in 1968, serving as its secretary general from 1978 to 1984. Vial promoted a neopagan stance in the vein of Marc "Saint-Loup" Augier.

Vial joined the Front National (FN) in 1988. The same year, he obtained a teaching position at Jean Moulin University Lyon 3. He soon reached the leadership ranks of the FN, serving as a member of the Institute of Formation of the party. However, Vial complained in both GRECE and the FN of a lack of focus on the ethnic dimension of identity, and he eventually decided to establish his own movement Terre et Peuple in 1994, launched publicly in 1995.

In a public declaration delivered at a Terre et Peuple meeting in May 2000, Vial lamented the "ethnic colonization" of France by non-European immigrant communities with a different "biological infrastructure". The "true cultural revolution", Vial ventured, was "the ethnic revolution, the revolution of identity".
