= François Duprat =

French essayist and politician (1940–1978)

- Born: 26 October 1940; Ajaccio, Corsica, France
- Died: 18 March 1978 (aged 37); Caudebec-en-Caux, Normandy, France
- Cause of death: Assassination by car bomb
- Known for: Cofounder of the National Front

François Duprat (French pronunciation: [fʁɑ̃swa dypʁa]; 26 October 1940 – 18 March 1978) was a French essayist and politician, a founding member of the National Front (FN) party and part of its leadership until his assassination in 1978. Duprat was one of the main architects in the introduction of Holocaust denial in France.

== Life and career ==
François Duprat was born on 26 October 1940, in Ajaccio, Corsica, and was educated in Bayonne, Toulouse, at the prestigious Lycée Louis-le-Grand in Paris. He graduated in history at the Sorbonne, earning a diploma of higher studies in history in 1963.

A communist in his teenage years, François Duprat moved to the far right and became a member of the Jeune Nation and the Federation of Nationalist Students (FEN). Strongly opposed to Algerian independence during the Algerian War (1954–62), Duprat was a member of the Organisation armée secrète. After the March 1962 Evian agreements granted independence to Algeria, he traveled to Katanga, supporting the secession led by Moise Tshombe. He became Tshome's Director of Propaganda on Radio-Katanga.

Thereafter, Duprat returned to France, where he became a member of Occident, which carried out street brawls against the Maoists and other left-wing students. However, he was excluded in 1967, accused of being a police informant. Duprat then took part in the Ordre Nouveau movement (New Order), and became the editor of L'Action européenne (European Action) and of the Revue d'histoire du fascisme (History Review of Fascism), which introduced in France Holocaust denial thesis supported by far right circles in the English-world.

Duprat, along with Maurice Bardèche, played a significant role in far-right anti-Zionist movement in France. In 1967, he led a rally for the Liberation of Palestine. Duprat's anti-Zionism is fundamentally antisemitic, with him blaming all Jews for human rights abuses committed by Israel. This position was in the minority, with Dominique Venner criticizing Duprat for his support of "communist Arabs" and arguing that Israel should not be confused with "the Jewish International."

In 1972, François Duprat co-founded the National Front (FN) headed by Jean-Marie Le Pen, and was part of its political bureau until his death in 1978. He represented the hard-liners of the party, and directed the Groupes nationalistes révolutionnaires (National Revolutionary Groups), alongside Alain Renault.

== Revisionist writings ==
François Duprat saw history as a political weapon, stating in May 1976:

We must not let to our opponents, Marxists and régimistes, (Note: This is a neologism, which alludes to legalistic supporters of the Republic, as "régime" means "regime" or "political regime".) the monopoly of the historical representation of men, facts and ideas. Because History is a wonderful war instrument, and it would be useless to deny that one of the important reasons of our political hardships resides in the historical exploitation and the systematic deformation of the nationalist experiences of the past... It is in order to answer these needs... that a team of intellectuals, professors and nationalists have created the Revue d'histoire du fascisme."

Duprat wrote a book on far right movements in France from 1940 to 1944, during the Collaborationist regime of Vichy. He also created a number of magazines and political reviews, including the Cahiers d'histoire du fascisme (History Notebooks on Fascism) and the Cahiers Européens-Notre Europe (European Notebooks – Our Europe), which also circulated denialist books or far right literature exalting the Third Reich.

== Death ==
Duprat was killed on 18 March 1978, in a car-bomb explosion. His wife Jeanine was also injured in the attack, losing the use of her legs. Duprat was finishing a book entitled Argent et Politique (Money and Politics), concerning the funding of right-wing and far-right political parties, at the time of his death. Although there are many theories about Duprat's assassination, historian Michel Winock notes that neither the perpetrators nor their motives have ever been identified; the police investigation into Duprat's assassination was inconclusive.

A Jewish "Remembrance Commando" and a "Jewish Revolutionary Group" immediately claimed responsibility for the murder. The perpetrators of the bombing were never found. Jean-Pierre Bloch, director of the LICRA anti-racist NGO, condemned the killing.

In Génération Occident: de l'extrême droite à la droite, Frédéric Charpier alleged that the assassination could have been commissioned by a rival far right organisation. He recalled that Duprat had been excluded in 1967 from Occident after allegations that he was a police informant. According to Roger Faligot and Pascal Krop, Duprat was killed for his links with the Syrian government.

Shortly before the assassination, journalist Patrice Chairoff published the names and addresses of numerous far-right leaders in France; one of the addresses happened to be Duprat's private residence. His funeral at the church of Saint-Nicolas-du-Chardonnet was attended by the leading lights of the nationalist right, which included the National Front, the PFN, monarchists and right-wing solidarists.

== Legacy ==
Le National, a far right political review, honoured Duprat in April 1978 as one of France's leaders of "the 'revisionist' historical school" who had introduced the French public to "one of the most explosive booklets" of Richard Harwood, member of the British National Front and author of the negationist pamphlet "Did Six Million Really Die?" The Cahiers européens – Notre Europe diffused this pamphlet starting in February 1976. The anonymous author of this text had been identified by Pierre-André Taguieff as likely being André Delaporte.

Each year, Jean-Marie Le Pen paid his respects at Duprat's gravesite at the cimetière de Montmartre. At the 30th anniversary of Duprat's death, LePen paid tribute to his being a "martyr to the cause of freedom of thought", "a fighter", and "politician right to the tips of his fingers".
