= Poujadism =

Far-right political ideology

Poujadism is a far-right political ideology and movement, named after Pierre Poujade.

== History ==
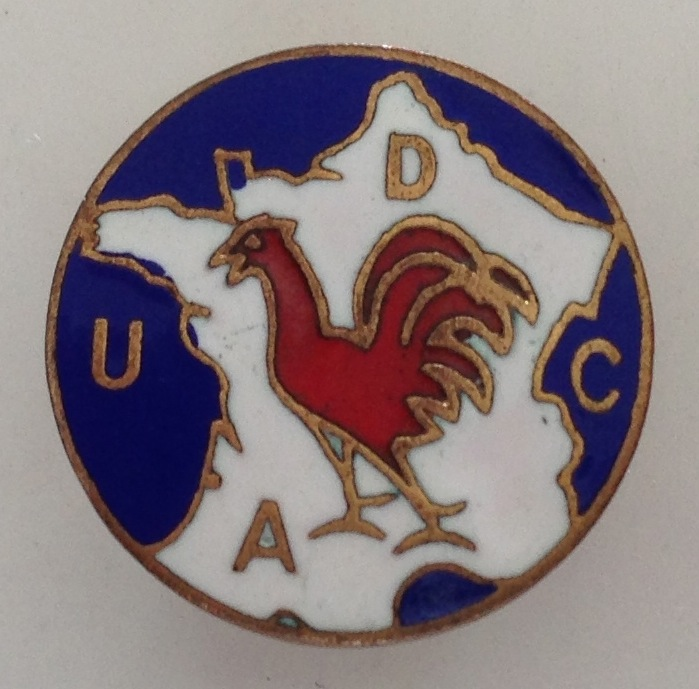
Logo of the organisation

After World War II, Poujade was the owner of a book and stationery store.

On 23 July 1953, with a group of about 20 persons, Poujade prevented inspectors of the tax board from verifying the income of another shopkeeper. This was the start of a tax protest movement by shopkeepers, first in the Lot department, then in the Aveyron department, and finally the whole south of the Massif Central.

On 29 November 1953, Pierre Poujade created the Union de Défense des Commerçants et Artisans (UDCA; Defense Union of Shopkeepers and Craftsmen), to organize the tax protesters. This movement would soon be called "Poujadism" (French: Poujadisme). Poujadism flourished most vigorously in the last years of the Fourth Republic, and articulated the economic interests and grievances of shopkeepers and other proprietor-managers of small businesses facing economic and social change. The main themes of Poujadism concerned the defense of the common man against the elites.

In addition to the protest against the income tax and the price control imposed by finance minister Antoine Pinay to limit inflation, Poujadism was opposed to industrialization, urbanization, and American-style modernization, which were perceived as a threat to the identity of rural France.

== Sources ==
- Collovald, Annie (2024-03-26). "From Poujade to Jean-Marie Le Pen to Marine Le Pen: a populist lineage in France?". Research Handbook on Populism. Edward Elgar Publishing. pp. 106–116. doi:10.4337/9781800379695.00018. ISBN 978-1-80037-969-5.
- Rosenthal, Howard (1985). "Poujadism: The political economy of a flash party". European Journal of Political Economy. 1 (4): 509–537. doi:10.1016/S0176-2680(85)80003-3.
- Shields, James G. (2000). "The Poujadist Movement: A faux 'fascism'". Modern & Contemporary France. 8 (1): 19–34. doi:10.1080/096394800113330. ISSN 0963-9489.
- Shields, James G. (2004-01-01). "An Enigma Still: Poujadism Fifty Years On". French Politics, Culture & Society. 22 (1). doi:10.3167/153763704780996708. ISSN 1537-6370.
