= Candide (newspaper) =

Candide (French pronunciation: [kɑ̃did]) was the name given to various French newspapers of the 19th and 20th century.

== Blanquist Candide ==
Candide was a newspaper founded by Gustave Tridon and Auguste Blanqui on 3 May 1865. It appeared on Wednesday and Saturday every week, and cost 5 centimes. The main collaborators on Candide were Blanqui, Tridon Villeneuve, Vaissier, Watteau, Marchand, Viette, Verlière and Sumino.

== Maurrassist Candide ==
The name was taken up in 1924 by a weekly newspaper launched by the bookseller Arthème Fayard. This paper was one of the main literary and political weeklies of the inter-war period, and its formula inspired other papers from Gringoire on the extreme-right to Vendredi and Marianne on the left. As for itself, Candide was rooted in the Maurrassist movement, nationalist and antisemitic: Pierre Gaxotte, personal secretary of Charles Maurras, was a member of the collective editorial leadership until 1940; Lucien Dubech as drama critic, Dominique Sordet as music critic, Maurice Pefferkorn for sports and Abel Manouvriez the legal columnist performed the same roles for both Candide and L'Action française; Lucien Rebatet and Robert Brasillach, two young Maurrassian talents, wrote for Candide. While it radicalised after 6 February 1934 it didn't adopt the robust fascism of Je suis partout keeping to a lighter tone. During the German occupation, Candide left Paris for the zone libre and supported Petain's Révolution nationale, while avoiding the collaborationism of Parisian titles such as Je suis partout. It was banned after the liberation of France.

== Gaullist Candide ==
A weekly called Le Nouveau Candide which counted Jean Dutourd, Paul Gordeaux and Gilles Perrault among its columnists as well as Jean-François Steiner who would become the chair of Maurice Papon's defense committee, appeared during the course of the 1960s. According to the revelations of Constantin Melnik, special adviser for prime minister Michel Debré, this weekly received secret funding in order to counter the influence of papers opposed to the Algerian war, such as L'Express and France-Observateur.
