= Les Sept Couleurs =

- Industry: publishing house, independent publisher
- Founded: 1948
- Founder: Maurice Bardèche
- Headquarters: France
- Products: novels, essays

Les Sept Couleurs is a French publishing house of the extreme right founded by Maurice Bardèche in 1948.

== History ==
The name of the company is reference to the work by Robert Brasillach, Les Sept couleurs, which was the first to be published by this SARL.

One of the principal objectives of this publishing house was to give a voice to those authors banned by the CNE, and other nationalists who in turn, led to the foundation of Rivarol and the journal Défense de l'Occident.

== Publications ==
Les Sept Couleurs own the collections of a number of nationalist authors, former collaborators, negotiationists, etc. They have published authors such as François Duprat, Pierre Fontaine, Pierre Hofstetter, Pierre de Villemarest, Axel Nicol, Paul Rassinier and Pol Vandromme.
