= Maurice Bardèche =

French literary critic and neo-fascist writer

- Bardèche in 1985
- Born: 1 October 1907; Dun-sur-Auron, France
- Died: 30 July 1998 (aged 90); Canet-Plage, France

Education
- Education: ENS

Philosophical work
- School: Neo-fascism
- Notable ideas: Neo-fascist metapolitics, revisionism

Maurice Bardèche (1 October 1907 – 30 July 1998) was a French art critic and journalist, better known as one of the leading exponents of neo-fascism and Holocaust denial in post–World War II Europe. Viewed as the "father-figure of Holocaust denial", Bardèche introduced in his works many aspects of neo-fascist and Holocaust denial propaganda techniques, methodology and ideological structures; his work is deemed influential in regenerating post-war European far-right ideas at a time of the identity crisis in the 1950–1960s.

Bardèche's main works include The History of Motion Pictures (1935), an influential study on the nascent art of cinema co-written with Brasillach; literary studies on French writer Honoré de Balzac; and political works advocating fascism and Holocaust denial, following his brother-in-law's poetic fascism, and inspired by fascist figures like Pierre Drieu La Rochelle and José Antonio Primo de Rivera. Bardèche was the brother-in-law of the collaborationist novelist, poet and journalist Robert Brasillach, executed after the liberation of France in 1945.

== Biography ==
=== Pre-WWII ===
==== Early life and education (1907–1932) ====
Maurice Bardèche was born on 1 October 1907 in Dun-sur-Auron, near Bourges, in a modest republican and anticlerical family. He attended the lycée of Bourges, before leaving his home region for the lycée Louis-le-Grand in Paris, where he met Thierry Maulnier and Robert Brasillach in 1926. The latter introduced him to Maurassian nationalist circles. If those groups were mostly anti-Jewish, Bardèche's own antisemitism was then more of a conventional manner than a deep conviction. In 1928, he was admitted to the prestigious École Normale Supérieure, where he received his agrégation degree in 1932. Bardèche wrote at that time for the royalist newspaper L'Étudiant français, parented by Action Française.

==== In the interwar (1933–1939) ====
In 1933, Bardèche and Brasillach moved to Vaugirard, in the 15th arrondissement of Paris, where they stayed for three years while Bardèche taught at the Collège Sainte-Geneviève of Versailles. He married Suzanne, Brasillach's sister, in July 1934. During their honeymoon in Spain, Bardèche had a car accident that left him with a permanent depressed skull fracture on the forehead. With his now brother-in-law Brasillach, Bardèche compiled The History of Motion Pictures in 1935, a study of the nascent art of cinema. According to scholar Alice Kaplan, it was "probably the first general history of cinema written in France, if not the world."

Writing for the Revue française, Bardèche also became a film critic for the art magazines 1933 and L'Assaut. During the Spanish Civil War, Bardèche was a supporter of Francisco Franco and the nationalist cause. In 1939, he edited with Brasillach a pro-Franquist book entitled Histoire de la guerre d'Espagne (History of the Spanish War). Bardèche published a fiercely antisemitic contribution in Je suis partout on 15 April 1938, on the occasion of an issue dedicated to the Jewish question.

==== Literary career and WWII (1939–1946) ====
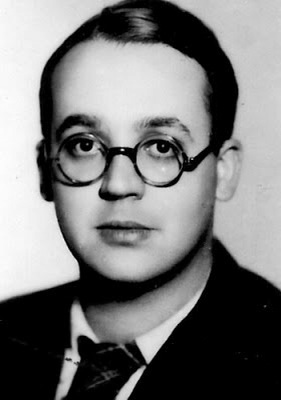
Robert Brasillach, fascist poet and brother-in-law of Bardèche. His execution in 1945 turned Bardèche into a "political animal".

After presenting his thesis on the works of novelist Honoré de Balzac in May 1940, Bardèche graduated with a doctorate in literature and was subsequently granted a temporary professorship at the Sorbonne University. He eventually became a professor of French literature at the University of Lille between 1942 and 1944, holding three Chairs at the same time. While he endorsed the deeds and actions of the French collaboration with the Nazis, Bardèche did not invest himself "physically" or ideologically during the war. He instead focused on his career as a literary critic, and wrote only three articles on arts (Stendhal, Balzac and films) for the antisemitic and collaborationist newspaper Je suis partout, in which Brasillach was the editor-in-chief until 1943.

On 1 September 1944, after the Liberation of Paris, Bardèche was detained for the articles he had written for Je suis partout. Brasillach surrendered to the authorities in order to allow for the release of Suzanne and their children, and he was eventually transferred to the Fresnes prison. Bardèche joined him on 30 December; one month later, Brasillach was sentenced to be executed for sharing intelligence with the enemy during the war. Bardèche was sentenced to one year in prison. He lost his university chair in literature and was, for a time, evicted from his apartment.

After the war, Bardèche's world view seemed entirely designed through the filters of Brasillach's death, the épuration, and a hatred of Marxism. He led for 30 years a "personal crusade to purify fascism" and present it as a respectable ideology. In April 1959, Bardèche told the nationalist magazine Jeune Nation: "I loved Brasillach very much, I admired him very much; and, I do not hide it from you, it is the death of Brasillach and the épuration that has turned me into a political animal. Politics did not interest me at all until that date; from then on, I went straight into politics." While in prison in 1945, Bardèche began to develop his own definition of fascism, by cutting away police repression, antisemitism and expansionist imperialism, in an attempt to present the ideology as "a youthful celebration and rejoicing, a new anti-bourgeois life-style, and the existence of feverish activism", in the words of scholar Ian R. Barnes. Meanwhile, Brasillach turned into a fascist martyr in French far-right circles; his cult and ideas were transmitted by Bardèche and fellow travellers through the post-war era.

=== Fascist writer ===
==== The "revisionist" trilogy (1947–1950) ====
Bardèche explained that he felt like a "foreigner" in a France he perceived as a "foreign country", or worse an "occupied country", in the immediate post-war period. In 1947, he wrote a letter to François Mauriac (Lettre à François Mauriac), who had unsuccessfully tried to convince Charles de Gaulle to grant Brasillach amnesty in 1945. In the letter, Bardèche dismissed the Resistance and the épuration, declaring the Vichy regime and collaboration legitimate. One year later, he established the "revisionist school", railing against what he called the "falsifications" and "manipulations" of history committed by the Allies.

In 1948, Bardèche espoused his "revisionist" thesis in the book Nuremberg ou la Terre promise, a sequel to Lettre à François Mauriac. In the words of historian Valérie Igounet: "if, as Maurice Bardèche shows us, the history written on Occupation is false, then why the history of the Second World War could not be so too?" Indeed, Bardèche wrote that the Nazi death camps were "inventions" of the Allies established to whitewash their own crimes. Jews were presented as ultimately responsible for the war, and likewise accused of falsifying history. Dismissed as the inventors of the Holocaust, Jews had allegedly designed a secret plan to "get revenge from Germany" and obtain international support for the creation of their nation state. If Bardèche did not refute the fact that Jews had suffered or had been persecuted during the war, he did deny the reality of their extermination. It was the first time since the end of the war that someone openly writes that he doubts the existence of the Holocaust. The book, which sold 25,000 copies, was considered an "apology of the crime of murder" by a court, and Bardèche was convicted to one year in jail and fined 50,000 Francs in the spring of 1952. Nuremberg ou la Terre promise was consequently banned, but circulated covertly. Bardèche spent only two or three weeks in jail in July 1954, then was granted amnesty by president René Coty. As he realized the difficulty of diffusing his ideas in a post-fascist context, Bardèche decided to establish his own publishing house Les Sept Couleurs, a name inspired by the title of one of Brasillach's novels.

In 1950, Bardèche released the last volume of his revisionist theory, Nuremberg II, ou les Faux-Monnayeurs, reiterating what he had written two years earlier. The novelty of this volume was the narrative construction Bardèche had designed around the tale of Paul Rassinier, a former deportee from Nazi concentration camps (not to be confused with extermination camps) turned into a Holocaust denier. Bardèche concluded on his side that kapos were in reality worse than SS, and expressed his "doubts" about the existence of gas chambers. After the release of his revisionist trilogy, Bardèche gained a new status in the international far-right movement. As neo-fascist activist François Duprat later wrote, Bardèche "showed that the 'fascist' far-right had found its intellectual leader". At the same time, Bardèche was recognized among academics as a leading expert of novelists Honoré de Balzac and Stendhal, and benefited in the public opinion from being the brother-in-law and spiritual inheritor of an "assassinated poet".

==== Neo-fascist activism (1951–1969) ====
To promote his neo-fascist ideas, Bardèche entered politics. In December 1950, he visited Germany to deliver speeches, creating an "apology of collaboration" and denouncing the "fraud of the French Resistance" before an audience essentially composed of former Nazis. Bardèche was also linked to the Ligue des Intellectuels Independents, and was a patron of Réalisme, the journal of the Union Réaliste. He co-founded the Comité National Français, an umbrella organization for extremist groups to operate, but stepped away when the movement embarked on a violently antisemitic course under the leadership of René Binet. Bardèche founded instead the more tactical and moderate Comité de Coordination des Forces Nationales Françaises.

At the end of 1950, Bardèche initiated in Rome the European National Movements, in order to co-ordinate various neo-fascist groups across the continent. At the congress, it was decided that another meeting would be held in Sweden the following year. Bardèche thereafter attended in May 1951 the founding meeting of the European Social Movement in Malmö, which drew 100 delegates from Europe, including Oswald Mosley. Bardèche represented France under the Comité National Français. On 6 February 1954, he participated in a commemoration of Robert Brasillach held by the neo-fascist group Jeune Nation, along with Pierre Sidos and Jean-Louis Tixier-Vignancour. With the latter, he co-established in the May 1954 the Rassemblement National Français. In 1952, the two of them commenced the journal Défense de l'Occident, designed as an arena for young fascists to air their views and, according to Barnes, a "reborn and renamed Je suis partout". During the Algerian War (1954–1962), Bardèche wrote numerous articles defending French Algeria, third-world colonialism, and segregation based on ethnic difference.

Unlike some of his contemporaries, Bardèche made no secret of his fascist stance, and wrote as the first sentence of his work Qu'est-ce que le fascisme? (1961): "I am a fascist writer". The book became a well-known theoretical work of post-war fascism both in France and abroad. Translated in Italian, it turned into a favorite book among local fascists. The context of the Algerian War, along with the political crisis it triggered in metropolitan France, made fascist ideas more acceptable for a short lapse of time in the wider society, which allowed Bardèche to publicly present himself as an advocate of fascism, a conviction which he had never openly admitted until then.

In 1969, Bardèche published Sparte et les Sudistes (Sparta and the Southerners), in which he wrote that far-right thinkers should not begin with men from the lens of ideology, a mistake he sees in the "rational and abstract definition of man" of left-wing writings, but rather "as they find them, in the place where they have grown, in the unequal bunches that nature has formed."

=== Later life ===
==== Return to literary studies (1971–1998) ====
Bardèche produced works on French novelists Honoré de Balzac, Marcel Proust, Gustave Flaubert, Louis-Ferdinand Céline and Léon Bloy, which are often cited in bibliographies. In parallel, he continued to publish neo-fascist and pamphlets denying the Holocaust, including Robert Faurisson's The Problem of the "gas chambers" (1978).

According to literary scholar Ralph Schoolcraft, "it would be misleading to infer a divorce between Bardèche's right-wing propaganda and his literary criticism. [...] He favored a totalizing vision that organized the entirety of a writer's production into a sort of organic system working in the service of a specific overriding design. Critics have seen this aesthetic view of literary art as analogous to visions of a fascist utopia, with the author posited as an absolute authority arranging elements hierarchically and moving towards a complete unity at the expense of diversity and ambiguity."

==== Death ====
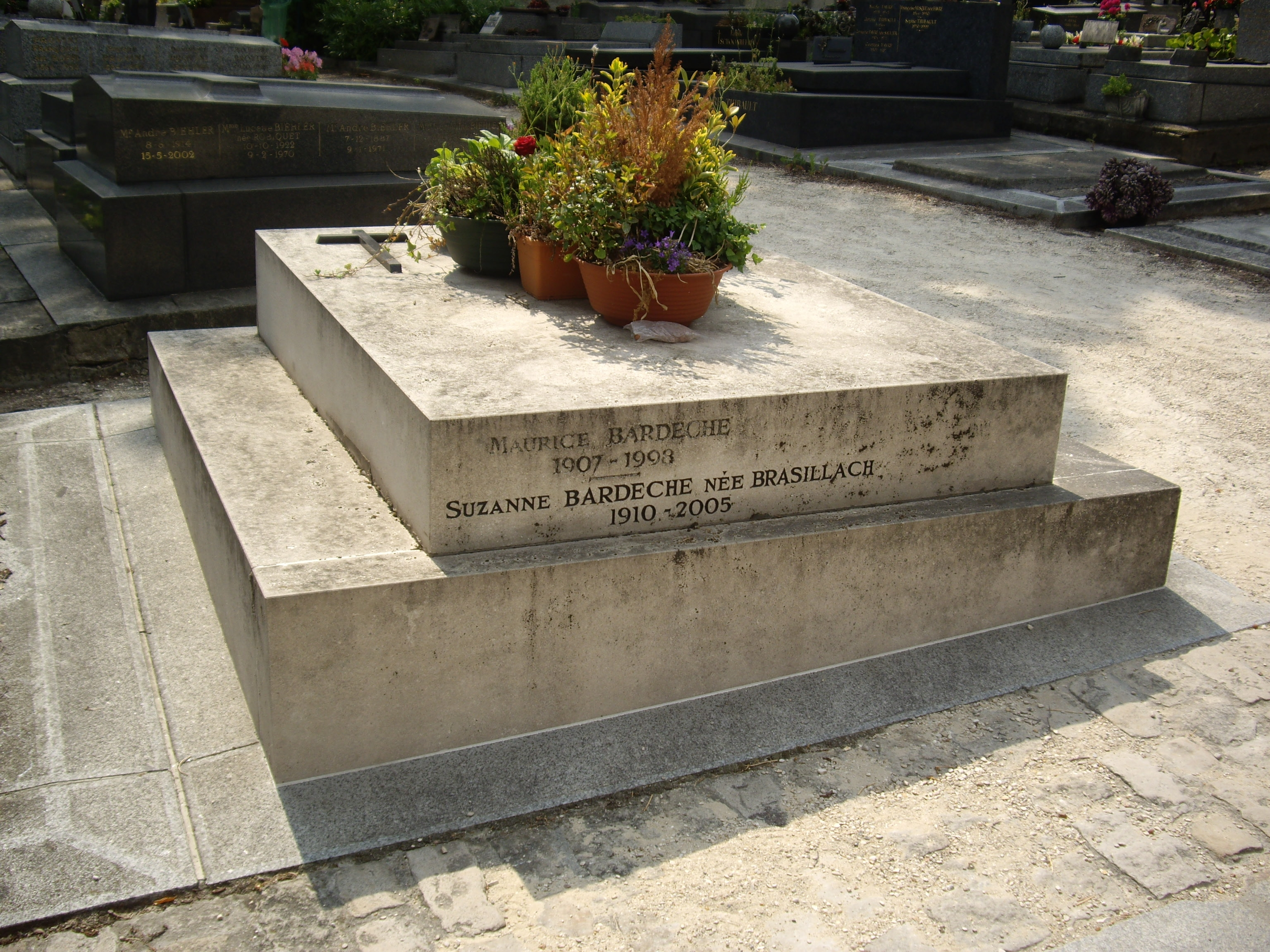
Gravestone of Maurice and Suzanne Bardèche

Maurice Bardèche died on 30 July 1998 in Canet-Plage. Jean-Marie Le Pen, then the leader of the National Front party, described him as "a prophet of a European renaissance for which he had long hoped". His wife Suzanne, the sister of Robert Brasillach, died in 2005.

== Views ==
According to political scientist Ghislaine Desbuissons, Bardèche was more of a political writer than a doctrinarian; rather than trying to establish a general doctrine, Bardèche "dreamt of fascism" and was more interested in restoring a metaphysical viewpoint on the nature of man. In Bardèche's view, fascism was indeed more of an "idea", an aesthetics and a "way of life" than an electoral project. Its prominent values were to be those of the "soldier" — braveness, loyalty, discipline and fidelity — and those of the "citizen", in reality the soldier's values applied to civil life.

Bardèche questioned Nazi crimes and drew up a real indictment against the Allies, citing their war crimes and propaganda, the Dresden bombings or the atomic bombings of Hiroshima and Nagasaki in order to play down Nazi wartime atrocities. He claimed that democratic idealism had created a closed world similar to that achieved by Marxism, and that by proscribing the fascist consciousness, the Nuremberg trials had eroded individual autonomy. According to Barnes, the democratic worldview was in Bardèche's vision "oppressive when it condemned fascist sensibilities through persecution"; in response, Bardèche "laid down an ideological basis which was defensive in character: he visualized a struggle for survival in a new world as a process of ideological Darwinism".

In an unusual stance among far-right thinkers, Bardèche has praised some Republican and Socialist events of French history: he laid a wreath every year at the Communards' Wall to commemorate the Paris Commune, a failed radical socialist revolution that occurred in 1871, and he co-founded in May 1966 the Association des Amis du Socialisme Français et de la Commune ('Association of Friends of French Socialism and the Commune'). Bardèche has also extolled Islam, praising the "virility of the Islamic religion and civilization. In Qu'est-ce que le Fascisme? (1962), he wrote: "In the Quran, there is something warlike and forceful, something virile, something Roman, so to speak."

=== Neo-fascism ===
In 1961, Maurice Bardèche redefined the nature of fascism in a book deemed influential in the European far-right at large, Qu'est-ce que le fascisme ? ("What is fascism?"). He argued that previous fascists had essentially made two mistakes: they focused their efforts on the methods rather than the original essence and principles; and they wrongly believed that a fascist society could be achieved through the nation-state as opposed to the construction of Europe. According to him, fascism could survive the 20th century in a new metapolitical guise only if its theorists succeed in building inventive methods, adapted to the changes of their times, in order to promote the core politico-cultural fascist project, rather than trying to revive doomed regimes:

The single party, the secret police, the public displays of Caesarism, even the presence of a Führer are not necessarily attributes of fascism. […] The famous fascist methods are constantly revised and will continue to be revised. More important than the mechanism is the idea which fascism has created for itself of man and freedom. […] With another name, another face, and with nothing which betrays the projection from the past, with the form of a child we do not recognize and the head of a young Medusa, the Order of Sparta will be reborn: and paradoxically it will, without doubt, be the last bastion of Freedom and the sweetness of living.

— Maurice Bardèche, Qu'est-ce que le fascisme? (Paris: Les Sept Couleurs, 1961), pp. 175–176.

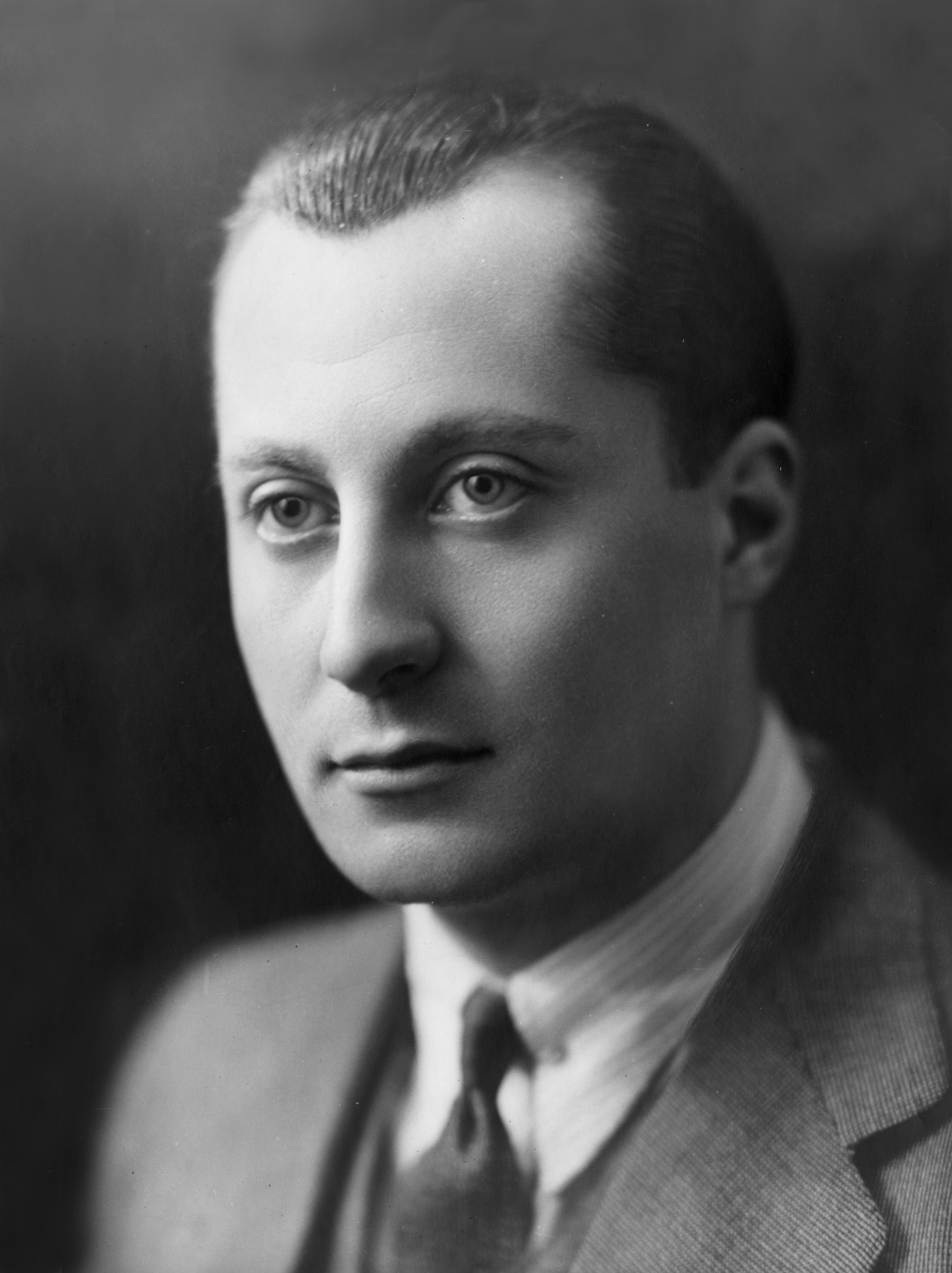
Bardèche cited José Antonio Primo de Rivera, the founder of the Falange, as his main influence.

Bardèche started to develop his own interpretation of fascism, which he defined as a youthful and heroic rebellion against the established intellectual structures, and as a defence of Europe against the influence of both capitalist America and communist Russia. He attempted to play down elements from the fascist doctrine that were commonly associated with the wartime far-right regimes, which he dismissed as "attempts" in the wider history of fascism rather than models to follow for the future. Bardèche rejected the single-party state, the absoluteness of the Führerprinzip, the myth of the "providential leader", and sought to dissociate fascism from anti-Semitism. On the question of minority, he stated: "there will always be a small minority of opponents in a Fascist regime", but they should be "left alone" as long as they do not hinder the global project. In Qu'est-ce que le fascisme?, Bardèche dismissed the systematic persecutions of Jews by the Nazis on no other ground than their race. His mode of fascist governance is close to a plebiscitary regime, which could allow discussions and debates as long as they do not deviate from the global fascist principles. According to Barnes, Bardèche "sought to divest fascism of its horrific past and to expose the essence of fascism that was distorted by the actions of Mussolini, Hitler and others", and only "indulged in bouts of self-criticism to give substance to and gain acceptance for his ideas."

Bardèche viewed the egalitarian concept of the Enlightenment as eroding distinct racial identities and vital differences, and as a means to "reduce humans in society to the status of ants". The Europe of politicians, Barnes wrote, was "incapable of defending itself against infiltration and subversion, and powerless against a foreign invasion because it had made a dogma of anti-racism. The growth of anti-fascism had reduced Europe to the condition of eighteenth-century Poland, where elites constantly indulged their own self-interests at the expense of the state, and exposed Europe to similar dangers, that is, attacks from both East and West." Bardèche also believed that the time of the nation state had passed, and he developed instead the idea of a "military and politically strong European bloc", a third way between capitalist America and communist Russia. This united Europe would initially take the form of a confederation of nation-states, before turning into a fascist federal state.

If he recognized José Antonio Primo de Rivera, the founder of the Falange, as his main influence, Bardèche did not conceive, unlike most of his far-right contemporaries, the Falange as a perfect example to imitate in the late 20th century. Although drew inspiration from the dirigist socialism of the Spanish fascists, Bardèche essentially tried to develop a theory of fascism adapted to the post-war environment, built on its original socialist, national, and hierarchical idea. According to him, the fascist society rests upon the idea that only a minority, "the physically saner, the morally purer, the most conscious of national interest", can represent best the community, and that this elite should be at the full service of the less gifted, in what he called a "feudal contract".

As summarized by Barnes, Bardèche's definition of fascism was characterized by "a reformist authoritarian and hierarchical socialism; he denigrated liberalism for its pursuit of self-interest and attacked Marxism for stimulating class warfare. What he offered was a third conception of life, a social moralism and nationalism, an alternative hierarchy of values and a social system opposed to the ideologies of Washington and Moscow. This society was conceived as being organic rather than mechanistic, hierarchical rather than egalitarian, and irrational rather than based in positivist reasoning."

=== Holocaust denial ===
Bardèche aimed at creating "two schools" of equivalence between fascists and the Resistance. These methods were later expanded and developed by other Holocaust deniers such as Paul Rassinier and Robert Faurisson, who, according to Barnes, "used textual notes and academic referencing, concentrated their denial effort on limited targets believing that to cause doubt over a minor historical point calls the larger picture into question. The two have additionally denounced orthodox historians and created a milieu of doubt."

We have been living for three years on a falsification of history. This falsification is clever: it leads to imaginations, then relies on the conspiracy of imaginations. [...] It had been a good fortune to discover in 1945 those concentration camps that no one had heard of until then, and which became precisely the proof we needed, the flagrante delicto in its purest form, the crime against humanity that justified everything. [...] The moral war was won. The German monstrosity was proved by these precious documents. [...] And the silence was such, the curtain was so skillfully, so abruptly revealed, that not a single voice dared to say that all this was too good to be perfectly true.

— Maurice Bardèche. Nuremberg ou la Terre promise, Les Sept Couleurs, 1948, pp. 9–10, 23.

To prove Germany innocent, Bardèche refuted the specificity of the Hitlerian crimes by drawing moral equivalence between the Soviet and the Nazi concentration systems. While discounting the Nazi attempt at the systematic extermination of Jews and Roma, Bardèche believed that Russians were just more skillful in their propaganda and the dissimulation of their own crime. Nazi extermination camps were likewise presented as a meticulous post-facto construction by Jewish "technicians" (portrayed as the architects of the "invention of the Holocaust"), and designed to dominate the world via a global secret plan of historical disguise.

Bardèche described the Nazi policies on Jews as "moderate" and "reasonable", and believed that the Holocaust was nothing more than a "grouping" of the Jewish people in a "reserve" through a population transfer to Eastern Europe (alluding to the Nisko Plan, cancelled in 1940). Other of his arguments formed the basis of numerous works of Holocaust denial that followed: "testimonies are not reliable, and essentially came from the mouth of Jews and communists", "atrocities committed in camps were the fact of deportees [essentially the kapos]", "disorganization occurred in Nazi camps following the first German defeats", "the high mortality rate is due to the 'weakening' of prisoners and epidemics", "only lice were gassed in Auschwitz", etc.

In the late 1980s, Bardèche declared to "agree on everything" the Front National endorsed, except for their imprecise agenda on the Jewish question, a subject Bardèche considered decisive. Contrary to the "rabid" anti-Semitism of writers like Lucien Rebatet and Louis-Ferdinand Céline, Bardèche tried to rationalize his anti-Jewish stance. In a 1986 interview with historian Alice Kaplan, he stated: "The anti-Semitism of Robert [Brasillach, and hence himself], and of a great part of the French, was an anti-Semitism of reason that wanted to limit the Jewish influence in France."

=== Anti-Americanism ===
In his 1951 book L'Œuf de Christophe Colomb, Bardèche explained that the United States had "killed the wrong pig" during WWII, and that anti-fascism turned out to be only an artifice of Bolshevik domination over Europe. Since only nationalists had always fought communism, they were presented in his writings as the only ones able to build a true anti-communist Europe, naturally allied with the nationalist countries of the Arab world against both America and Israel.

If some people think of establishing an antifascist and stateless Europe, which would be virtually remote-controlled from New York or Tel Aviv, this colonized Europe does not appeal to us at all, and we also believe that such a conception would only prepare the way for communist infiltration and war.

— Maurice Bardèche, L'Œuf de Christophe Colomb, 1951.

== Works ==
- Maurice Bardèche; Robert Brasillach (1935). Histoire du cinéma. Denoël et Steele.
  - English translation: ——; —— (1938). The History of Motion Pictures. New York: W. W. Norton & The Museum of Modern Art.
- ——; —— (1939). Histoire de la guerre d'Espagne. Plon.
- —— (1940). Balzac romancier: la formation de l'art du roman chez Balzac jusqu'à la publication du 'Père Goriot', 1820-1835 (Thesis). Plon.
- —— (1947). Lettre à François Mauriac. La Pensée libre.
- —— (1947). Stendhal romancier. La Table ronde.
- —— (1948). Nuremberg ou la Terre promise. Les Sept Couleurs.
- —— (1950). Nuremberg II ou les Faux-Monnayeurs. Les Sept Couleurs.
- —— (1951). L'Europe entre Washington et Moscou. R. Troubleyn.
- —— (1951). L'Œuf de Christophe Colomb. Lettre à un sénateur d'Amérique. Les Sept Couleurs.
- —— (1956). Les Temps modernes. Les Sept Couleurs.
- —— (1957). Suzanne et le taudis. Plon.
- —— (1961). Qu'est-ce que le fascisme ?. Les Sept Couleurs.
- —— (1968). Histoire des femmes. Stock.
- —— (1969). Sparte et les Sudistes. Les Sept Couleurs.
- —— (1971). Marcel Proust, romancier. Les Sept Couleurs.
- —— (1974). L'Œuvre de Flaubert. Les Sept Couleurs.
- —— (1980). Balzac. Juillard.
- —— (1986). Louis-Ferdinand Céline. La Table Ronde.
- —— (1989). Léon Bloy. La Table Ronde.
- —— (1993). Souvenirs. Buchet-Chastel.
- —— (2023). La Mafia des démocraties. Kontre Kulture.
- —— (2025). La Droite et l'Esprit du Fascisme. Kontre Kulture.

== See also ==
- Chantons sous l'Occupation - a documentary film featuring Bardèche.
