= Pierre Daye =

Belgian collaborator with Nazi Germany

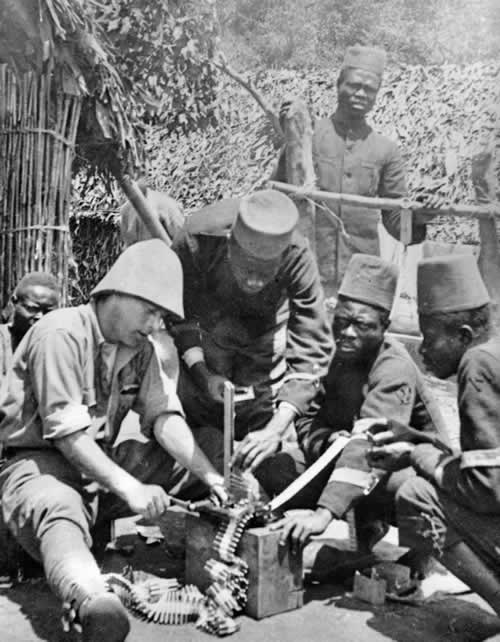
Pierre Daye with Force Publique during World War I

Pierre Daye (24 June 1892, Schaerbeek, Belgium – 24 February 1960, Buenos Aires, Argentina) was a Belgian journalist and Nazi collaborator. As supporter of the Rexist Party, Daye exiled himself to Juan Peron's Argentina after World War II.

== Biography ==
In World War I Daye served in the Belgian Army on the Yser Front and in East Africa. In 1918 he published a book about his experiences in the Battle of Tabora.

Pierre Daye was in charge of foreign politics in the Nouveau Journal, a newspaper supporting the National Socialist thesis created in October 1940 by Paul Colin and under the direction of Robert Poulet.

Daye was a shareholder in the Editions de la Toison d'Or created during the war (out of a total of 150 shares, 135 were owned by the Slovak group Mundus, which was responsible to the Reich Foreign Affairs Minister headed by Joachim von Ribbentrop.)

Daye was a correspondent of Je suis partout, the ultra-collaborationist French language review headed by Robert Brasillach. He was sentenced to death as a collaborator on 18 December 1946, by the Brussels War Council.

== Escape and aftermath ==
After the war, he fled to Argentina with the help of Charles Lescat, who also worked at Je suis partout. There, he took part in the meeting organized by Juan Perón in the Casa Rosada during which a network (colloquially called ratlines) was created, to organize the escape of war criminals and collaborationists. Along with countryman René Lagrou and others such as Jacques de Mahieu, Daye became central to the Nazi escape routes.

In Argentina, Daye resumed his writing activities, becoming the editor of an official Peronist review. He returned to Europe where he wrote his memoirs, and died in 1960 in Argentina.

== See also ==
- Rexism
