= Saralegui =

Saralegui, officially Saralegi and Zaralegui in Basque, is a Basque surname and may refer to:

- Arcadio Larraona Saralegui (1887–1973), Spanish cardinal
- Carlos Hipólito Saralegui Lesca (better known as Charles Lescat; 1887–1948)), Argentine activist
- Cristina Saralegui (born 1948), Cuban-American journalist and actress
- Marcelo Saralegui (born 1971), Uruguayan footballer
- Mario Saralegui (born 1959), Uruguayan footballer and manager
