= The History of Motion Pictures =

1935 book by Robert Brasillach and Maurice Bardèche

- Authors: Robert Brasillach, Maurice Bardèche
- Language: French
- Genre: Non-fiction, film
- Published: 1935
- Publication place: France

The History of Motion Pictures is a 1935 book by Robert Brasillach and Maurice Bardèche. Originally released in French as Histoire du Cinéma, it was translated into English by Iris Barry in 1938 and published in the United Kingdom by George Allen & Unwin as History of the Film.

The History of Motion Pictures is regarded as an influential work of film criticism. According to scholar Alice Kaplan, it was "probably the first general history of cinema written in France, if not the world."

== History of publication ==
Although Brasillach and Bardèche were fascist writers, the first edition of the book is generally seen as exempt from far-right ideas. Several Jewish directors (or thought to be of Jewish descent), such as Charlie Chaplin (Note: Speculation about Chaplin's racial origin existed from the earliest days of his fame, and it was often reported that he was a Jew. Research has uncovered no evidence of this, and when a reporter asked in 1915 if it was true, Chaplin responded, "I have not that good fortune." The Nazi Party believed that he was Jewish and banned The Gold Rush on this basis. Chaplin responded by playing a Jew in The Great Dictator and announced, "I did this film for the Jews of the world.") and Fritz Lang, were held in high regard by Brasillach and Bardèche. However, in the 1943 edition, which was updated by Brasillach alone and published during the Nazi occupation of France, earlier judgments were remodelled to reveal an overt anti-Semitism. For instance, the "strangely human note to his [Chaplin's] misfortune" mentioned in the 1935 version became a "strangely Hebraic note" in 1943.

Those changes had not been requested by the Germans. In a 1986 interview given to Kaplan, Bardèche stated, "The Chaplin of the first films is not the same as the Chaplin of the cinéma engagé he created afterwards. We were irritated by films like The Dictator, later films where there is idiocy and side-taking ... That's not where Chaplin's genius lies. But on the other hand, those later films signaled to us certain aspects of Chaplin's genius, and we said to ourselves that, well, Chaplin isn't as simple as we thought."

The work was reedited in 1948, 1954, 1963, and 1964. The current available editions in both French and English come from the original 1935 version.

== Editions ==
French

- Histoire du cinéma. Denoël et Steele. 1935.

English

- The History of Motion Pictures. Translated by Barry, Iris. New York: W. W. Norton & The Museum of Modern Art. 1938.
- History of the Film. London: George Allen & Unwin. 1938.
