= Raymond De Becker =

Belgian journalist and writer (1912-1969)

- Born: Raymond-Charles-Jean De Becker; 30 January 1912; Schaerbeek, Brussels, Belgium
- Died: 18 April 1969 (aged 57); Versailles, France
- Occupations: Journalist, writer
- Writing career
- Pen name: Pierre Marinier

Raymond De Becker (1912–1969) was a Belgian journalist, writer, and intellectual. He became closely involved in Catholic and anti-parliamentarian politics in the interwar years and is notable as the editor of the daily newspaper Le Soir and a leading exponent of "intellectual collaboration" in German-occupied Belgium during World War II.

== Biography ==
Raymond-Charles-Jean De Becker was born into a lower-middle-class family Schaerbeek, a suburb of Brussels, on 30 January 1912. Employed as a clerk and burdened with debts after the death of his father in 1930, he joined Catholic Action for the Belgian Youth (Action catholique de la Jeunesse belge, ACJB), affiliated with the wider movement of Catholic Action and became secretary-general of its newspaper L'Effort. Although not a student, he became close to the milieu of young radical Catholic students at the Catholic University of Leuven. He spent several months of seclusion at Tamié Abbey in Italy in 1932 and returned to establish the Communauté group at Leuven which expounded an ideology of Catholic collectivism. In the interwar years, he was in close contact with leading intellectuals such as Jacques Maritain and Emmanuel Mounier.

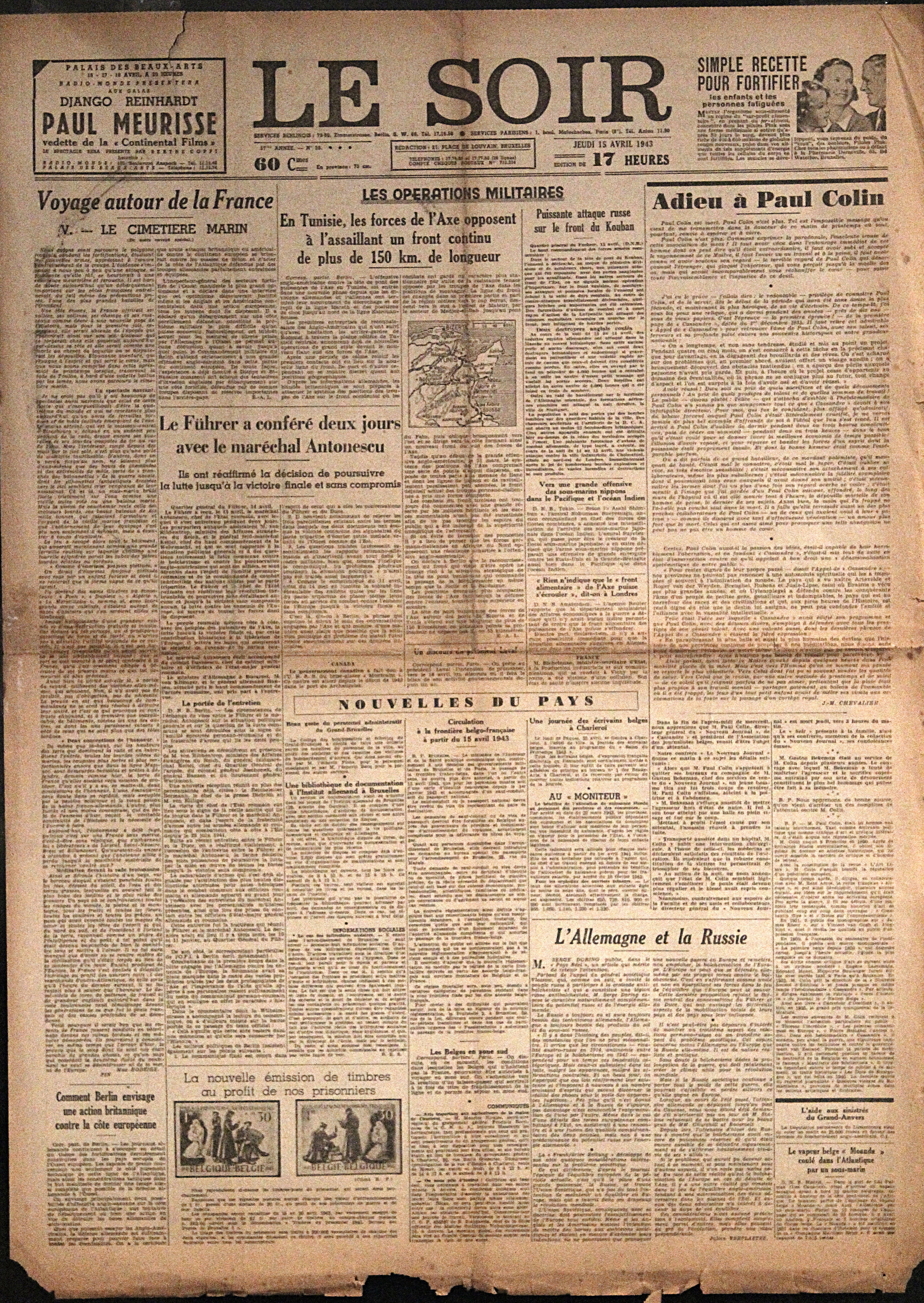
A 1943 edition of "the stolen Le Soir"

A gifted writer and polemicist, De Becker became an active writer and was actively involved in a large number of newspapers, reviews, pamphlets, and books from 1930 in which he articulated his sense of Catholic spirituality and contempt for the "established disorder" of parliamentarism, materialism, and the hierarchies of the Church. He set out his views at length in the pamphlets Le Christ, roi des Affaires ('Christ, King of Business'; 1930) and Pour un ordre nouveau ('For a New Order'; 1932) which "testify to the abstraction of his political thought and his attachment to an authoritarian, corporatist and regionalistic régime of a Medieval type". De Becker was also widely known to be homosexual by 1935 and became increasingly distanced from the Christianity and instead became increasingly interested instead in Europeanism and the need for reconciliation between France and Germany. He strongly supported neutrality after the reaffirmation of the policy by Belgium in 1936. He edited the newspaper Indépendance from 1936 to 1939 and wrote widely on the importance of Belgian neutrality in another newspaper, covertly funded by Nazi Germany, called L'Ouest from 1939.

After the German invasion of Belgium in May 1940 he became a leading figure in "intellectual collaboration" in Belgium. He was made editor of the mass circulation newspaper Le Soir in June 1940 which had been expropriated from its pre-war owners Rossel & Cie. It was re-purposed to carry censored news and propaganda under German supervision. This edition was popularly dubbed "the stolen Le Soir" (Le Soir volé). De Becker was initially convinced that the creation of a German-led New Order in Europe was imminent and hoped for Belgium to retain some autonomy as an authoritarian state under German auspices. He expanded on these themes in an autobiographical essay published in 1942 as Livre des Vivants et des Morts (lit. 'Book of the Living and the Dead'). Earlier he had joined one of the major collaborationist groups in Belgium, Léon Degrelle's Rex. However De Becker left Rex in 1941 and his relationship with the Germans deteriorated. In August 1943 he attempted to distance himself and Le Soir from German control and adopt a stance that was more sympathetic to the Western Allies. However, he was removed from the post on 4 October 1943 and placed under house arrest by the German authorities in a hotel at Hirschegg in the Austrian Alps. This time De Becker was friends with writer Henry Bauchau and the cartoonist Georges Remi (Hergé), which he employed at Le Soir.

After Hirschegg was liberated by the French Army, De Becker travelled to France and sought to return to Belgium which had been liberated by the Western Allies in September, 1944. He was arrested almost immediately on arrival on 8 May 1945 and imprisoned at Saint-Gilles prison. Sentenced to death for collaboration in 1946 by the Brussels War Council as part of the épuration légale, his sentence was subsequently commuted to life imprisonment in 1947 and he was released altogether in 1951 but remained subject to severe restrictions which he attempted, with some success, to challenge at the European Court of Human Rights (De Becker v Belgium). He emigrated to Lausanne in Switzerland and wrote extensively for the Gazette de Lausanne under the pseudonym Pierre Marinier. He became interested in cinema, Jungian psychoanalysis, Oriental religions, and the paranormal and wrote on these subject in the post-war years. He was also an "active" pederast. He died at Versailles, near Paris, on 18 April 1969.

== See also ==
- Paul Colin (1895–1943), collaborationist journalist involved with Le Nouveau Journal and Cassandre assassinated in 1943.
- Robert Poulet (1893–1989), collaborationist journalist also distanced from Rex
- Non-conformists of the 1930s, active in France
