= Paul Rassinier =

French political activist (1906–1967)

- Born: 18 March 1906; Bermont, France
- Died: 28 July 1967 (aged 61); Asnières-sur-Seine, France
- Occupation: Journalist
- Known for: Holocaust denial
- Political party: PCF (1923–1932); FCIE (1932–1934); SFIO (1934–1951)

Paul Rassinier (18 March 1906 – 28 July 1967) was a French communist and socialist political activist and writer who is viewed as "the father of Holocaust denial". During World War II he was a member of the French resistance and he survived the Buchenwald and Mittelbau-Dora concentration camps. A journalist and editor, he wrote hundreds of articles on political and economic subjects.

== Early life ==
Rassinier was born on 18 March 1906 in Bermont in the Territoire de Belfort, into a politically active family. During World War I Paul's father Joseph, a farmer and a veteran of the French colonial army in Tonkin (present day Vietnam) was mobilized, but was put into a military prison for his pacifist attitudes, something his son Paul never forgot.

After the war, his family favored the post-war socialist revolutions, and he joined the French Communist Party (PCF) in 1922. He secured a post as a teacher at the École Valdoie, and in 1933, he became a Professor of History and Geography at the College d'Enseignement General at Belfort.

In 1927, he served in the French Army in Morocco, where his pacifist views were reinforced by the brutal colonialist repression and military corruption he witnessed. He later described how "We became deadened to scandalous scenes of torture, which had no reason to envy those of the Middle Ages, and saw the apparatus of dictatorship not retreating, but even advancing in the face of an assassination!" Upon his demobilization, he returned to his teaching post and his political activism. It is also around this time that he became a member of War Resisters' International.

== Pre-war political activities ==
Rassinier moved up to become the Party Secretary of the PCF in the Department of Belfort. In 1932, Lucien Carre, the Communist Youth Secretary of Belfort, was arrested, and a leftist coalition made up of several organizations, including the Section française de l'Internationale ouvrière (The SFIO), held protest rallies and demonstrations. Rassinier supported Henri Jacob's effort to enlist the middle-class parties, and for this and other acts "betraying the interests of the working class", both Jacob and Rassinier were expelled from the Communist Party in 1932.

Jacob had been slated to be the Communist candidate as deputy for the Canton of Belfort. After his expulsion, he still ran for office and won, which encouraged him, Paul Rassinier, and other alienated Communists to form a separate party, The Independent Communist Federation Of The East. Formed in 1932, Rassinier was the Party Secretary, Jacob the Assistant Secretary. Rassinier was also the editor of the Party newspaper, The Worker. Neither the party nor the paper became popular, and both were dissolved in 1934.

The 6 February 1934 crisis seemed to create new opportunities for the worker's movement, and around this time Rassinier joined the SFIO. He became Secretary of Federation SFIO for the Territory of Belfort, and revived a moribund newspaper, Germinal, to serve as the party organ. He also ran for office several times, without success. Adopting the ideology of Marceau Pivert, he was a prolific author, denouncing the arms race, advocating the revision of the Treaty of Versailles, demanding more workers rights and supporting a pacifist ideology that would not be restricted to France, but become Pan-European.

As war clouds gathered, Rassinier wrote articles condemning Nazism and Fascism, describing their foreign policy as "a policy of gangsters", with warnings that neither Italy nor Germany could be trusted to respect their promises. But when the Munich Agreement was signed in 1938, Rassinier was one of many Frenchman who would describe himself as "an inhabitant of Munich". Echoing the words of former Prime Minister Léon Blum, his support of the Accords was "without much pride, it is true, but without any shame", since he regarded war as the greatest catastrophe, and didn't believe "that even Mussolini after Ethiopia, even Hitler who makes blood run in the company of Spain, will risk such a madness". He received condemnation for his pacifist stance, but replied that while it's easy to be a fair-weather pacifist, a true commitment to peace is something done both in and out of season and he expressed his disappointment that so few Socialists were "on this side of the barricade".

In August 1939, after the Nazi-Soviet Pact, Rassinier was arrested by French counter-intelligence, who suspected that his newspaper was receiving Nazi funding. Thanks to the intervention of Paul Faure and the SFIO, he was released a few days later, and when France was invaded in May 1940, he reported to his militia unit, where he and his comrades spent weeks in the barracks waiting for orders that never came. After France was overrun, he resumed teaching in Belfort.

== Wartime years ==
Many of the "Socialists of Munich" joined in collaboration, but not Rassinier. In June 1941, with the invasion of the Soviet Union, resistance in France came alive and Rassinier first joined up with The Volunteers Of Freedom, a Republican-Socialist coalition; and then with the Resistance group Liberation, organized in the north of France by Henri Ribière. Rassinier became the director of Libération Nord for the territories of Alsace and Belfort. Like others in various nations who were members of War Resisters' International, he practiced non-violent resistance to the Nazi German occupation, both because of his pacifism and his fear that reprisals would fall on innocent people. Rassinier, using an expression common at the time, did not feel comfortable "to play with the skin of others".

Using his publishing contacts, he printed false identity papers, and helped establish an underground railroad from Belfort to the Swiss town of Basel, smuggling resistance fighters, political refugees and persecuted Jews to safety. In 1986, testimony of resistance member Yves Allain revealed that Rassinier had also worked closely with BURGUNDY, an escape network set up by the Special Operations Executive to smuggle shot-down Allied pilots back home through Switzerland.

Rassinier wrote articles for the Vichy-friendly newspaper Le Rouge et le Bleu (The Red and the Blue), then, along with J.L. Bruch, Pierre Cochery and Albert Tschann helped found The Fourth Republic, an underground paper that advocated resistance and tried to lay a post-war foundation for France, so "that all those who will survive the war together can and must rebuild peace together, and thus save the country from a civil war." The Fourth Republic demanded that Germany was to be held accountable for the crimes of Nazism, but the contribution of the Treaty of Versailles would not be ignored, nor would Germany and Italy be held unilaterally responsible for starting the war. BBC broadcasts from both London and Algiers congratulated the founding of the paper, and broadcast some excerpts, though by the time the only wartime edition came out Rassinier was already under arrest.

The local Communist resistance groups of the Front National (FN) were hostile to Rassinier's idea of non-violent resistance and were enraged when Rassinier published leaflets condemning Soviet Communism equally with the National Socialism of Hitler. After several warnings, the Communists condemned him to death. Rassinier's life was saved when in reaction to attacks on Germans at a local pharmacy and coffee house, both German and Vichy French police launched a series of raids that led to several arrests, one of them a person with a forged identity card. He broke under interrogation and revealed how he had obtained it, and on 30 October 1943 Rassinier was arrested in his classroom by agents of the Sicherheitsdienst (SD), his arrest observed by a Liberation-North agent who was delivering forged identity and ration cards to him. His wife and two-year-old son were also arrested, but released a few days later. For eleven days, Rassinier was interrogated, the beatings involved leading to a broken jaw, crushed hand and ruptured kidney.

Rassinier was then deported to Germany, enduring a three-day rail transport that ended on 30 January 1944 at Buchenwald concentration camp. After three weeks in quarantine, he became prisoner number 44364 and was transported to Dora, where V1 and V2 rockets were built in tunnels. Work conditions were terrible. Hunger, disease, overwork, exhaustion and physical abuse by the SS and the corrupt mafia of the Häftlingsführung (camp lower administration made of prisoners themselves; see "Prisoner functionary") resulted in a catastrophic death rate.

In his first book Crossing the Line, he says several factors contributed to his survival. Beginning in April 1944, his wife mailed him food parcels, though this stopped in November. His friendship with his Block Chief resulted in his parcel being delivered directly to him without first being plundered by the prisoner government. For a time, he landed a cushy job in "Schwung" (a position somewhere between orderly and manservant) to the SS Oberscharführer commanding the guard dog company, and got the opportunity to observe the SS at close range. Also, partly as a result of his interrogation, he came down with nephritis, and spent no less than two hundred and fifty days of his imprisonment in the Revier (infirmary).

On 7 April 1945 he was evacuated from Dora on what became a death train, endlessly traveling the German rail network from one bombed-out destination to another, with no food, water, or shelter. After several days, as the train rounded a bend and in spite of his terrible physical condition, he jumped off and thanks to the angle, escaped the SS gunfire. American soldiers rescued him the next day.

He returned to France in June 1945 and was awarded the Ribbon of Resistance (but not the Rosette as he claimed). He claimed that he was awarded the Vermilion Medal of the French Recognition but there is no trace of it in the Journal Officiel's lists (Nadine Fresco, Fabrication d'un antisémite, Paris, Éditions du Seuil, 1999, p. 760, n. 178). He was also classified as 95 percent an invalid (later to be revised to 105 percent). He returned to his teaching post, but because of his physical condition, was prematurely retired in 1950.

== Post-war political activities ==
In 1945, Rassinier resumed his positions as head of the Belfort Federation SFIO and editor of The Fourth Republic. He ran for office, and in June 1946 was elected as the substitute for Rene Naegelen, Belfort's Deputy to the National Assembly. Naegelen did relinquish the post, and for two months Rassinier served in the National Assembly of France, only to be beaten in the next election by Pierre Dreyfus-Schmidt, an old rival. His wife Jeanne had a dim view of his future in politics, and he never again ran for office. He continued with other political activities, such as working with André Breton, Albert Camus, Jean Cocteau, Jean Giono, Lanza del Vasto and Father Robert Treno in agitating for the rights of conscientious objectors.

== 1949–1967: The author ==
By 1948, Paul Rassinier had been a history teacher for over twenty-two years, and was distressed to read stories about the concentration camps and deportations that he claimed were not true. He was also appalled at the unilateral condemnation of Nazi Germany for crimes against humanity that from his experience in Morocco he did not consider unique, and claimed to fear that nationalistic hatreds and bitterness would divide Europe. As he explained it in The Lie of Ulysses:

one day I realized that a false picture of the German camps had been created and that the problem of the concentration camps was a universal one, not just one that could be disposed of by placing it on the doorstep of the National Socialists. The deportees—many of whom were Communists—had been largely responsible for leading international political thinking to such an erroneous conclusion. I suddenly felt that by remaining silent I was an accomplice to a dangerous influence.

Rassinier's first book, Crossing the Line (1949), an account of his experience in Buchenwald, was an immediate critical and commercial success, one reviewer describing it as "the first testimony coldly and calmly written against the demands of resentment, idiotic hatred or chauvinism". The Trade Union of Journalists and Writers also praised it, and it was recommended reading by the SFIO. It is notable for its criticism of the prisoner government. Rassinier claims that effective resistance was found only among the Russian prisoners, and that many brutalities in the camp were committed not by the SS, but by the mainly Communist prisoners who took over the Häftlingsführung and ran the internal affairs of the camps for their own benefit. Rassinier blamed the high death rate at the two camps he saw on their corruption.

His second book, The Lie of Ulysses: A Glance at the Literature of Concentration Camp Inmates (1950) caused controversy. Rassinier examined what he considered to be representative accounts of the camps. He criticized exaggerations and denounced authors, such as Eugen Kogon, who in L'Enfer Organisé (1947) claimed that the Buchenwald prisoner government's main objective was "to keep a nucleus of prisoners against the SS." Rassinier asserts that this nucleus of prisoners were only looking out for themselves, and further claims that the Communists were trying to save their own skins after the war, saying that: "by taking by storm the bar of the witnesses and with extreme shouting, they avoided the dock." He also describes his visits to Dachau and Mauthausen, noting that in both places, he got contradictory stories on how the gas chambers were supposed to have worked, and for the first time expresses his doubts on the existence of gas chambers and a Nazi policy of extermination.

The book created a scandal, and on 2 November 1950 was even attacked on the floor of the French National Assembly. More because of the foreword by Albert Paraz than for the content of the book, both Rassinier and Paraz were sued for slander by various organizations. After a see-saw round of trials and appeals, both Rassinier and Paraz were acquitted, and an expanded edition of The Lie of Ulysses was published in 1955, which sold well. However, the uproar led to complaints from members of the SFIO, and on 9 April 1951 Rassinier was expelled from the party "in spite of the respect which his person imposes", as the expulsion document noted. A rehabilitation effort by Marceau Pivert was rejected.

Rassinier spent the rest of the 1950s advocating socialism and pacifism. He wrote articles for Defense of Man and The Way of Peace, condemning the wars in Indochina and Algeria, along with French post-war financial policy. He also wrote for the libertarian newsletter Contre-Courant and the bulletin of the anarchist SIA (Solidarité International Anti-Fasciste), as well as many other publications. In 1953, he published The Speech of the Last Chance – An Introductory Essay to the Doctrines of Peace, describing the ideology of pacifism, and in 1955 Parliament in the Hands of the Banks, a condemnation of capitalism and French financial policy. His 1960 essay The Equivocal Revolutionary was his only theoretical work, a metaphysical and dialectical examination of revolutionary thought applied in the second part to a socialist analysis of the 1956 Hungarian Revolution. It was serialized in several papers, and a mildly successful book version was published in 1961.

Also in 1961, he returned to his earlier themes with Ulysses Betrayed By His Own, an anthology of the speeches he gave during a twelve-city lecture tour of Germany built around a third edition of The Lie. This tour had been sponsored by Karl-Heinz Priester, a former SS officer and propagandist for Joseph Goebbels (and once a U.S. intelligence asset). Priester was one of the organizers of the right-wing Deutsche Reichspartei, and this, along with his increasing association with right-wing activists such as Maurice Bardèche led to him being denounced as an anti-semite by people such as Olga Wormser-Migot, who stated that Rassinier "belongs to the spiritual family of Louis-Ferdinand Céline", a writer often criticized as anti-semitic.

In 1962, after the Jerusalem trial, Rassinier published The True Eichmann Trial or The Incorrigible Victors, a condemnation of the Nuremberg Trials and Adolf Eichmann trials, and in an expanded second edition, of the Frankfurt Auschwitz trials, from which he had been forcibly excluded by the West German government. At the end of the expanded edition, he argued that continuing war crimes trials were part of a Zionist and Communist strategy to divide and demoralize Europe. Further denunciations of Rassinier came in the press, such as when journalist Bernard Lecache described him as an "agent of the Nazi Internationale".

It was in 1964, with The Drama of the European Jews, that Rassinier came to the conclusion that there was never a policy of extermination by Nazi Germany. He criticized Raul Hilberg's book The Destruction of the European Jews (1961), again critiqued witness testimony, and questioned the technical feasibility of the claimed methods of extermination. His critique of Doctor At Auschwitz by Miklós Nyiszli was partially confirmed twenty-five years later by the forensic historian Jean-Claude Pressac. He cited the Zionist book L'Etat d'Israel (1930) by Kadmi Cohen to again assert that Zionist and Jewish organizations were conspiring to use Nazi crimes to extort money to fund themselves and the State of Israel. Part II of the book contained a statistical study intended as a reply to those of Leon Poliakov and Hilberg. Rassinier claimed an advantage by using as his starting point the 1934 study The Jews in the Modern World by Arthur Ruppin. Pierre Vidal-Naquet, a frequent critic of Rassinier's who had exchanged correspondence with him, criticized this in 1980 in A Paper Eichmann - Anatomy of a Lie.

The Drama generated little interest and languished in obscurity until 1977, when Georges Wellers, editor of the magazine Le Monde Juif, dissected the book in the first attempt at a detailed rebuttal of any of Rassinier's writings. Wellers lists errors, omissions and misquotes by Rassinier, some of them egregious. At one point in the essay, Wellers condemned Rassinier's arguments as "a model of hypocrisy and the outrageous deceit typical of all the procedures currently employed by Rassinier."

Also in 1964, in the course of a libel lawsuit brought by the French communist Marie-Claude Vaillant-Couturier, it was revealed that Rassinier had written articles in the far-right magazine Rivarol under the nom de plume Jean-Paul Bermont, and he was forced to terminate many of his anarchist contacts.

In 1965, Rassinier published his last successful book. Rolf Hochhuth's 1963 play Der Stellvertreter. Ein christliches Trauerspiel (The Deputy: A Christian Tragedy) had been performed in several languages and many countries. Rassinier was a declared atheist, but was outraged by Hochhuth's thesis that Pope Pius XII stood silently by while the Jews of Europe were exterminated, and saw in the play only an incitement to divide Europe by religious hostility (anti-Catholicism) and xenophobia. He traveled to Rome, and was given access to the Vatican archives. Operation Vicar was a defense of Pope Pius XII that called into question the motives of Pius' Protestant and socialist critics. Rassinier demonstrated that Catholic opposition to Hitler compared favorably with Protestant support of him, and drew attention to Pope Pius' pre-war condemnations of Nazism (e.g. Mit brennender Sorge) and efforts for peace, which brought Rassinier praise from the Vatican.

From 1965 to 1967, Rassinier continued to write, and his last series of articles, "A Third World War for Oil" were published in Défense de l'Occident from July through August 1967. In his final book, Those Responsible For The Second World War, Rassinier tries to establish the responsibility of the Jews for the outbreak of the war.

== The father of Holocaust denial ==
During the early 1960s, Rassinier corresponded with the American revisionist historian Harry Elmer Barnes, who arranged for the translation of four of Rassinier's books. Barnes would posthumously publish a favorable short review of Rassinier's book The Drama of the European Jews, entitled Zionist Fraud for the American Mercury. In 1977, these were collectively published by Noontide Press under the title Debunking The Genocide Myth. While some of Rassinier's books had been reviewed before in the United States, for most of the English speaking world this was their first introduction to Rassinier's writings.

Besides Barnes, whose critical writings of the origins of the First World War were admired by Rassinier, another of his influences was Jean Norton Cru and his titanic 1929 study: Witnesses: Tests, Analysis and Criticism of the Memories of Combatants Published in French from 1915 to 1928. In The Lie of Ulysses, Rassinier claims Cru's book gave him the tools he needed to evaluate witness testimony.

=== Influence on David Irving ===
During the Irving v Penguin Books Ltd trial, Professor Richard J. Evans stated that David Irving's Holocaust denial had been influenced by Rassinier, something that Irving denied, claiming he had not read Rassinier's books, despite having written an afterword for one of them.

== Final years ==
Rassinier's lifelong dream was to write the history of Florence during the age of Machiavelli, but he did not live to realize it. His kidneys had been badly damaged from his torture at the hands of the SS and his fifteen months in Buchenwald and Dora, and he never recovered. He was an invalid for the last twenty-two years of his life, with hypertension so bad that it was dangerous for him to stand up. He died on 28 July 1967 in the Parisian suburb of Asnieres, while working on yet more books, The History of the State of Israel and a book version of A Third World War for Oil.

== Works ==
- Crossing the Line: The Human Truth, 1949
- The Lie of Ulysses: A Glance at the Literature of Concentration Camp Inmates, 1950
- The Speech of the Last Chance: An Introductory Essay to the Doctrines of Peace, 1953
- Candasse or the Eighth Capital Sin, A History Over Time (Rassinier's autobiography), 1955
- Parliament in the Hands of the Banks, 1955
- Ulysses Betrayed By His Own, 1961
- The Equivocal Revolutionary, 1961
- The True Eichmann Trial or the Incorrigible Victors, 1962
- The Drama of the European Jews, 1964
- Operation Vicar. The Role of Pius XII Before History, 1965
- Those Responsible for the Second World War. 1967

== See also ==
- Roger Garaudy
