= Les Deux Étendards =

1952 novel by Lucien Rebatet

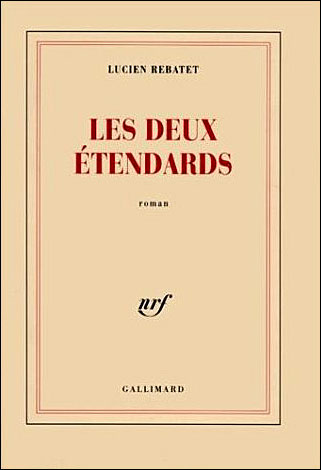
- Book cover
- Author: Lucien Rebatet
- Language: French
- Publisher: Éditions Gallimard
- Publication date: 1952
- Publication place: France
- Pages: 1015

Les Deux Étendards ("The two banners") is a 1952 novel by the French writer Lucien Rebatet.

== Background and publication ==
Rebatet began to write the novel in 1942 and continued to write it in the Sigmaringen enclave, where he fled together with the Vichy government in 1944. In 1946 he was sentenced to death for his sympathy for National Socialism and collaboration during the war, but the penalty was commuted to forced labour the next year. He finished the novel in prison before he was released in 1952. The novel was published in two volumes, with 496 and 519 pages respectively.

== Plot ==
The narrative is partly autobiographical and set in Lyon in the 1920s. It follows two young men who are in love with the same woman; one of them is to become a Jesuit priest, while the other—the author's alter ego—is a fierce agnostic.

== Reception ==
The novel has been praised by a large number of French-language writers, critics and intellectuals, such as Roger Nimier, Antoine Blondin, Jean Paulhan, Étiemble, Pol Vandromme, José Cabanis, Jean Dutourd, George Steiner, Anne Desclos, Jean Duvignaud, Marc-Édouard Nabe, and Simon Leys. Several of them have named it as one of the greatest novels of the post-war era, but it is also controversial due to the writer's background.

Pascal Alain Ifri, professor of French at the Washington University in St. Louis, wrote in his monograph about the novel: "Because of Rebatet's pro-fascist, pro-German and antisemitic positions before and during World War II, notably seen in his virulent pamphlet Les Décombres, there is, indeed, in the literary and journalist environment, a consensus, which was set at the publication of the book and which continues to this day, to keep quiet about Rebatet's novel, and this despite the fact that love, religion and art, and not politics, constitute its principal themes."
