= L'Art libre =

Biweekly literary magazine in Belgium (1919–1922)

- Editor-in-chief: Paul Colin
- Categories: Literary magazine
- Frequency: Biweekly
- Founder: Paul Colin
- First issue: 1919
- Final issue: June 1922
- Country: Belgium
- Based in: Brussels
- Language: French

L’Art libre was a literary magazine which was published in Brussels between 1919 and 1922. The magazine is known for its support for the Clarté-ideology.

== History and profile ==
L’Art libre was established in Brussels in 1919. Paul Colin was the founder and editor-in-chief of the magazine. Its editorial board included both Dutch- and French-speaking individuals. The magazine was published in French on a biweekly basis.

L’Art libre was one of the mouthpieces of the Clarté movement founded by Paul Vaillant-Couturier in France and had an internationalist stance. It frequently featured the French translations of the literary work by international authors. In the early 1920 the magazine published three essays by Ezra Pound.

L’Art libre folded in June 1922. Its successor was the Europe magazine which was started immediately after the closure of L’Art libre.
