= Arnaud Fraiteur =

Belgian resistance fighter during World War II

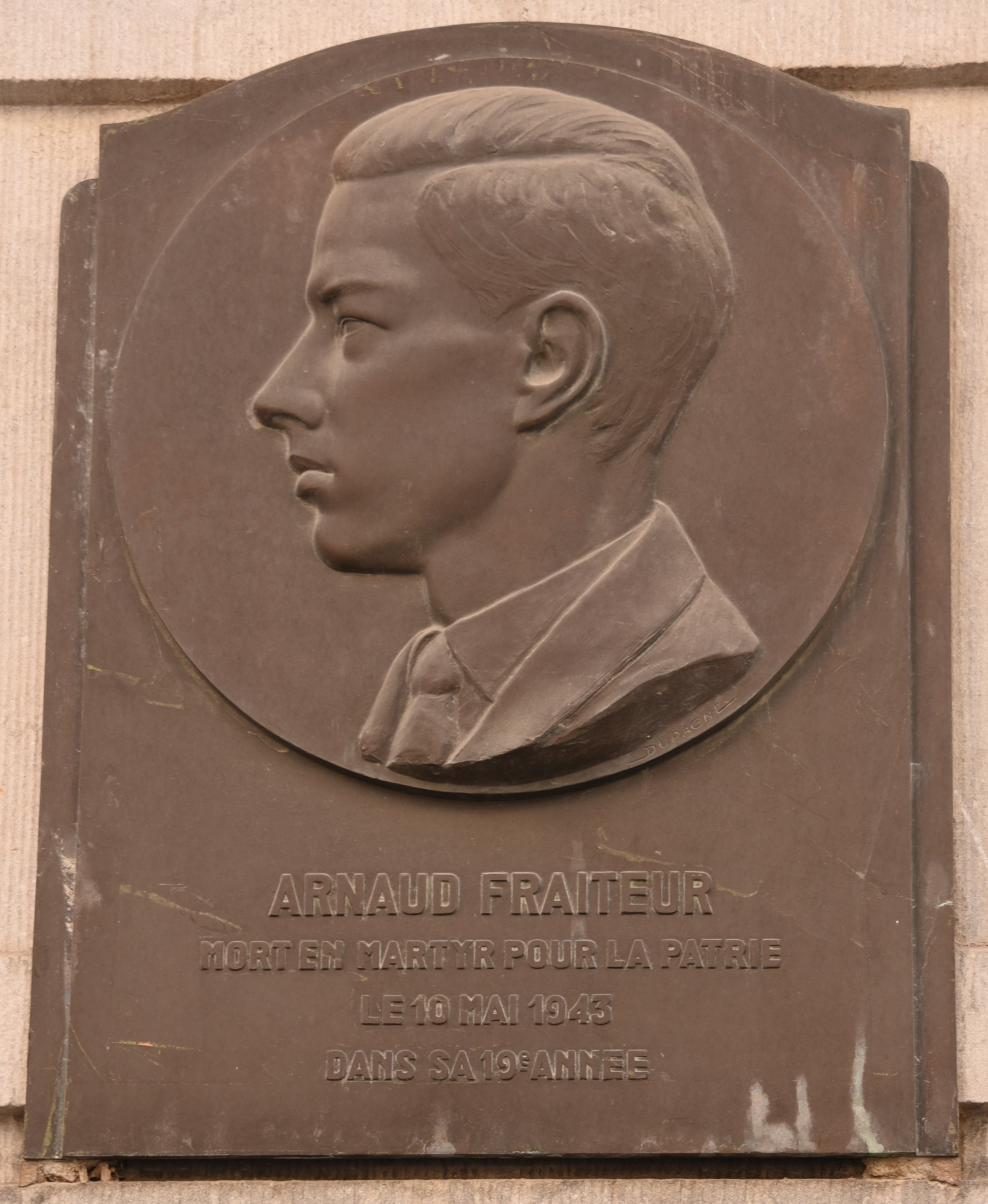
- Commemorative Plaque in Brussels
- Born: 23 May 1924; Ixelles, Belgium
- Died: 10 May 1943 (aged 18); Fort Breendonk, Province of Antwerp, German-occupied Belgium
- Cause of death: Execution by hanging

Arnaud Fraiteur (23 May 1924 – 10 May 1943) was a Belgian resistance fighter. He was hanged by the German occupation authorities at Fort Breendonk for assassinating the Belgian collaborator Paul Colin.

== Before the war ==
Born into an upper-middle-class family on 23 May 1924, Arnaud Fraiteur went to secondary school at the Athénée Royal d'Ixelles.

After graduating, he enrolled at the University of Liège, where he successfully passed the entrance exams in civil engineering. In May 1940, the invasion of Belgium by the Nazis marked the end of his studies: the University of Liège as well as the Université libre de Bruxelles (Free University of Brussels) had to suspend their courses on 24 November 1941.

== During the occupation ==
After the invasion, Fraiteur took underground undergrad classes in civil engineering at the Free University of Brussels.

In 1941, he joined the Partisans Armés as a liaison officer under the nom de guerre Max. Just like many other young people affiliated to the University of Brussels that were gathered by Groupe G, he participated in multiple actions organized by a unit from Brussels that was specialized in the fight against intellectual collaboration.

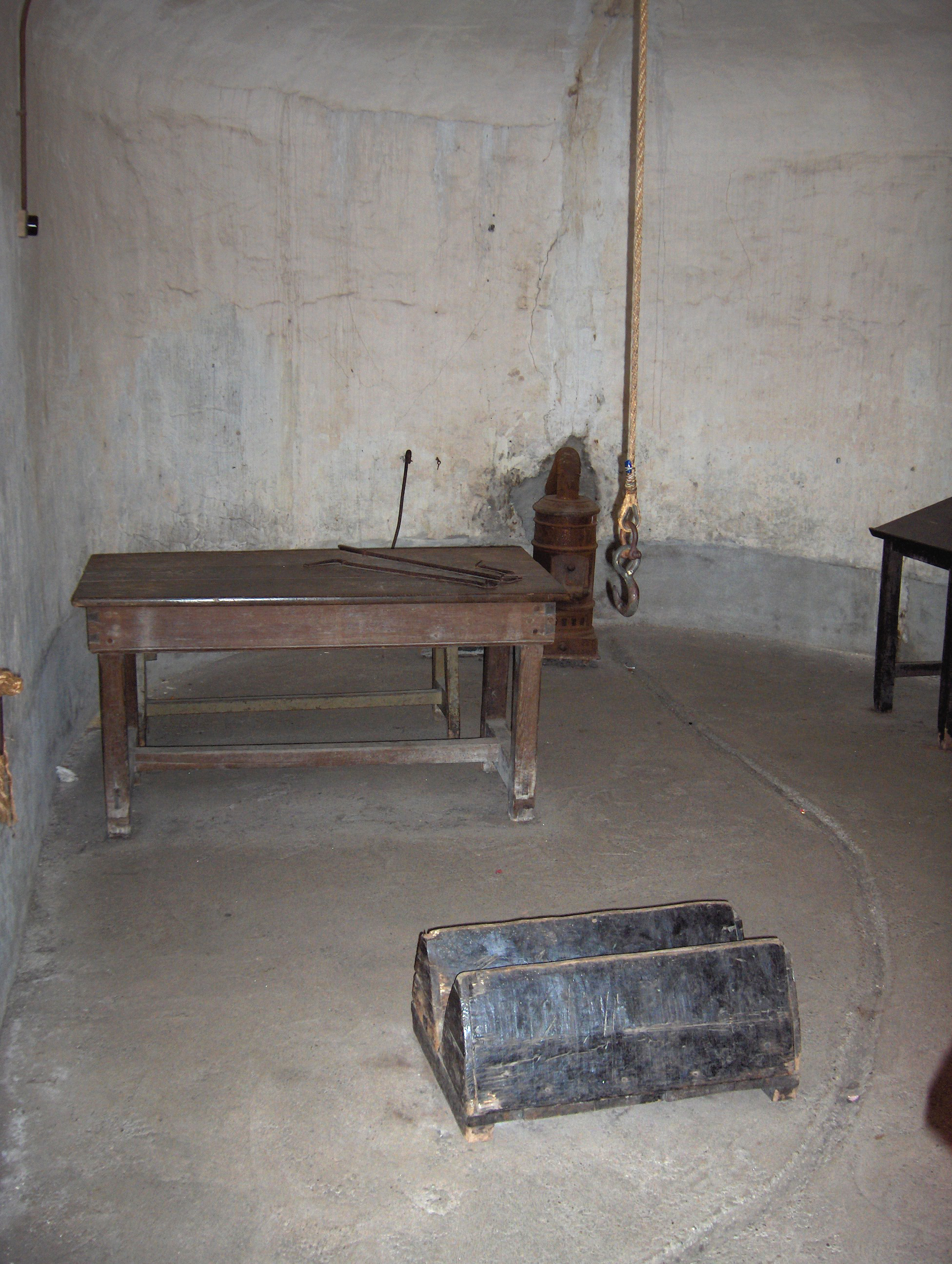
The "bunker": the torture chamber in Fort Breendonk where Fraiteur, Raskin and Bertulot, but also many other prisoners, were interrogated.

In April 1943, Jacques Grippa put Fraiteur in charge of killing the journalist and art critic Paul Colin, a well-known collaborator in the press, editor in chief of the weekly Cassandre, and of the daily Le Nouveau Journal, which he had founded in 1940.

On 13 April, accompanied by two other members of the resistance, André Bertulot and Maurice Raskin, Fraiteur shot multiple bullets at Paul Colin as well as at his bodyguard in a library at 87 Rue de la Montagne in Brussels, which was located under the offices of Nouveau Journal and Cassandre. Fraiteur managed to flee, but Bertulot and Raskin were arrested shortly afterwards. (Note: According to some sources, Bertulot was picked up immediately and Raskin the next day, see ULB Résistance, p. 21; according to others, both were arrested at the place of the attack, see Jours de guerre sous le signe de l'héroïsme, de Bruxelles à Varsovie, en passant par Boortmerbeek Fraiteur, symbole de la révolte, Le Soir.)

Even though the assassination only involved Belgians, the German authorities immediately took control of the investigation, which proved how important Paul Colin was for them. The Feldgendarmerie, the Geheime Feldpolizei and the Gestapo came to the crime scene and detained André Bertulot and Maurice Raskin: the Belgian police and justice were taken off the case.

Arnaud Fraiteur was quickly identified due to the license plate on the bicycle that he had left at the crime scene, and the family home was placed under surveillance on the same evening.

As he was on the run, he did not go home and hid at the home of friends of his parents in Uccle, while Réseau Zéro, with the help of ALI-France (led by Joseph Dubar), were organizing his escape to England. Réseau Zéro asked a driver of the Ministry of the Colonies to drive him to France. However, the driver (called Hoogeveen), assisted by Paul Herten, who had replaced Paul Colin at the head of the Nouveau Journal, denounced him to the German authorities, which made it possible for the Gestapo to arrest him (as well as his guide and Drubar's direct assistant, Raymonde Marc of the ALI-France network, codenamed Carmen,) on 29 April 1943, a few miles outside of Halle, on the road towards the French border.

After being interrogated, and tortured, Fraiteur, Raskin and Bertulot were sentenced to death by the Oberfeldkommandantur's military court in Brussels after a show trial that was supposed to serve as an example to the Belgian population. They were hanged on 10 May 1943 at Fort Breendonk. (Note: They may have been the first put to face the gallows there, see D Day Overlord, Forum; US Army 39-45, Forum.) They were buried at the "Enclos des fusillés" in Schaerbeek. (Note: The name of Fraiteur's burial site may have led to confusion concerning his death as C. Laporte wrote in Le Soir of 30 July 1994, p. 18, that "Fraiteur was shot".) On 7 June 1945, Fraiteur's body was exhumed in order to be buried in the family vault on the cemetery of Saint-Gilles.

On 3 October 1944, the two who had denounced Arnaud Fraiteur, Herten and Hoogeveen, were sentenced to death by the court-martial of Brabant. On 13 November 1944, they were shot in the back, the punishment for traitors, in Saint-Gilles Prison. The two men were the first Belgians to be executed for wartime collaboration.

== Commemoration ==
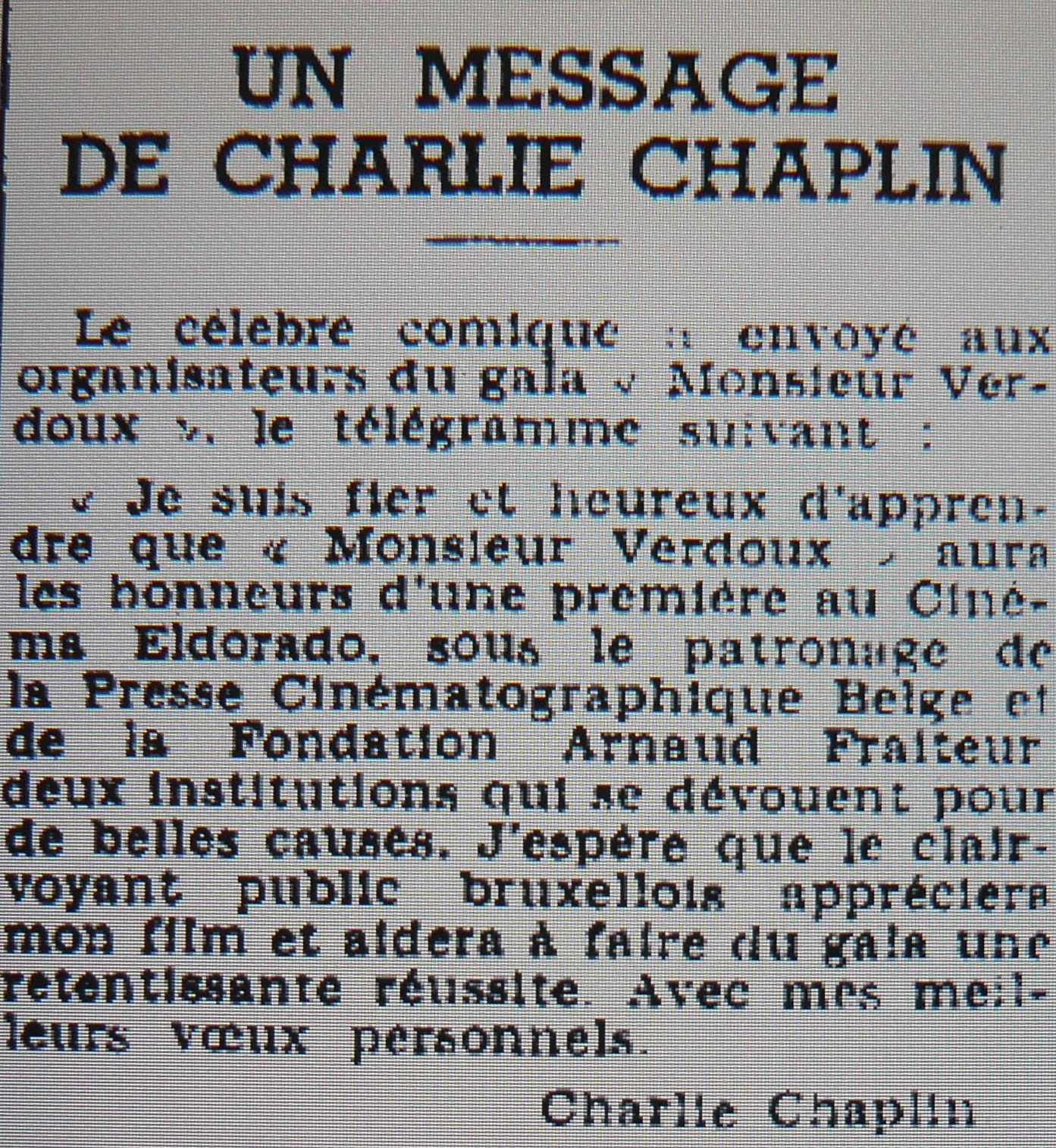
Telegram of Charlie Chaplin to the members of the Association de Presse Cinématographique Belge, in the Belgian daily Le Soir, 16 March 1948

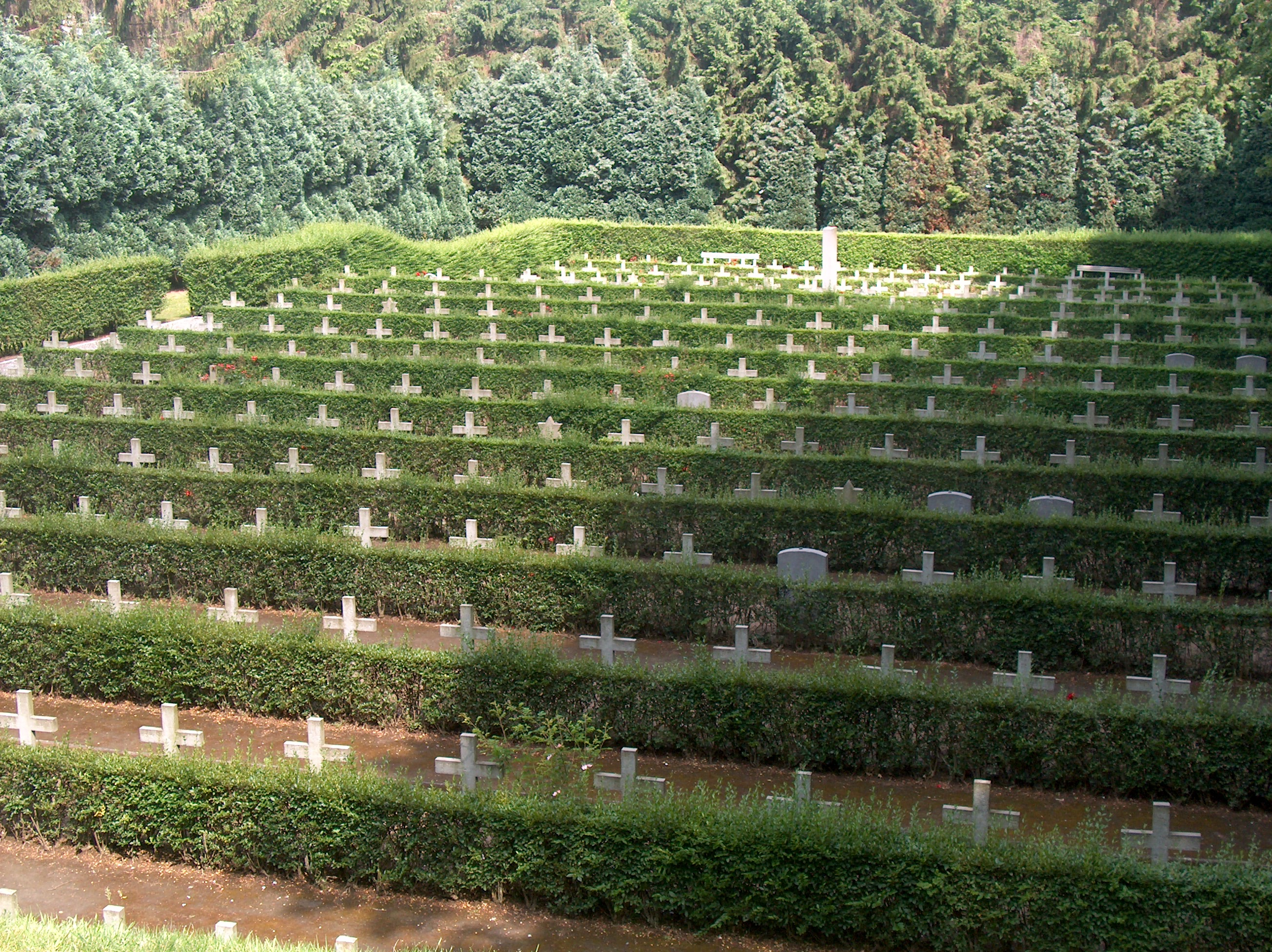
The Enclos des fusillés in Brussels today

In 1947, Arnaud Fraiteur's family allowed a new centre specialized in helping disabled children to be named after the young resistance fighter: Le Centre Arnaud Fraiteur (Arnaud Fraiteur centre) in the municipality of Molenbeek-Saint-Jean in Brussels. (Note: See the website Centre Arnaud Fraiteur.) It was the first Belgian centre of this kind.

Afterwards, his name was given to an avenue, a bridge, and a bus stop located on the intersection between the Boulevard du Triomphe and the Avenue Arnaud Fraiteur.

A commemorative plaque is attached to Fraiteur's family home at Rue de la Concorde 60.

== Related article ==
- Belgian Resistance
