= Charles Lescat =

Argentine Nazi collaborator (1887–1948)

- Born: Carlos Hipólito Saralegui Lesca; 19 February 1887; Buenos Aires, Argentina
- Died: 1948 (aged 60–61); Argentina

Charles Lescat (19 February 1887 – 1948) was a French-Argentine citizen and writer, who studied in France and directed and wrote in Je suis partout, the ultra-Collaborationist journal headed by Robert Brasillach.

Born as Carlos Hipólito Saralegui Lesca in Buenos Aires of Basque immigrant parents, his parents returned to France in 1893 after 25 years in Argentina, when Lesca was six years old. He volunteered for the French Army during World War I. There, Lescat became a personal friend of Charles Maurras, leader of the Action Française (AF) monarchist movement. Independently wealthy, he founded the Revue de l'Amérique latine. In 1936, he took over the administration council of Je suis partout, and was editor in chief of this review for a time. In 1941 he published an antisemitic book titled Quand Israël se venge (When Israel Takes Revenge), through the Éditions Grasset publishing house.

After the Liberation of Paris, he took refuge in Germany before travelling to Francoist Spain. He arrived in Uruguay in 1946, and later established himself in Juan Peron's Argentina. There, he organized one of the ratlines used by collaborators and Nazi fugitives. Lescat helped Pierre Daye find refuge in Argentina.

Lescat was sentenced to death in absentia in May 1947 by the High Court in Paris, but, despite extradition requests from France, Lescat, a native Argentine citizen, was never extradited. He died in Argentina in 1948.

== Sources ==
- Charles Lescat - extradiciones (in Spanish)
