= Paul Colin (journalist) =

Belgian journalist

- Born: 1895; Saint-Josse-ten-Noode, Belgium
- Died: 8 April, 1943 (aged 47–48); Brussels, Belgium
- Cause of death: Assassination by gunshot
- Occupations: Belgian journalist and Nazi collaborator

Paul Colin (French pronunciation: [pɔl kɔlɛ̃]; 22 October 1895 – 8 April 1943) was a Belgian journalist and art critic. A collaborator during the German occupation of Belgium in World War II, he was assassinated by members of the Belgian Resistance.

== Biography ==
Colin's father, a businessman, died when Colin was two. In 1914 he began university studies in history and art history, but these were interrupted by the start of the First World War. Discharged from military service due to myopia, Colin worked at the Royal Museums of Fine Arts in Brussels during the war.

Drawn to the internationalist pacifism of Romain Rolland and André Suarès in the post-war years, Colin founded the journal L’Art libre in 1919. The journal, which appeared until 1922, promoted avant-garde art and literature and took a progressive political stance; Colin was critical of the Treaty of Versailles, which he saw as carrying the seeds of a future German revenge.

In 1923 Colin moved to Paris and took part in the foundation of the journal Europe; he would break with it the following year, as he disapproved of its marxist stance. Until 1931 he was also director of the Galerie Georges Giroux in Brussels.

== 1930s ==
Towards the final years of the 1920s, Colin had been drawn to Belgian nationalism; he was drawn further to the right in the early 1930s, and began to approach fascism and nazism. In 1933 he became director of the publishing house Nouvelle Société d’Édition, and in the following year he founded the artistic and literary journal Cassandra.

In September 1939 Colin, along with Robert Poulet, Pierre Daye and ten other journalists (most of them fascists, but including some left-wing pacifists) signed a pro-German manifesto calling for Belgian neutrality in the war. This manifesto has often been claimed to be the starting-point of French-speaking journalistic collaboration in Belgium, though another version claims Paul-Henri Spaak, a socialist minister at the time, was the secret sponsor of the manifesto.

== 1940s ==
In 1940, after Belgium was occupied by Nazi Germany, Colin founded the Nazi propaganda newspaper Le Nouveau Journal. The first edition appeared on 1 October of that year. One of Colin's associates, Robert Poulet, had in the meantime secretly met King Leopold III's private secretary, Count Capelle, and obtained a tentative royal approval for the project.

However, as the war dragged on, German victory became less certain and food rations decreased, more and more Belgians joined the ranks of those who criticized the "New Order". In 1943, various members of the Belgian Resistance, led by Marcel Demonceau, hatched the plan to kill both Colin and the Rexist leader Léon Degrelle. In 1943, Colin was shot dead by a member of this Resistance group, 19-year-old Arnaud Fraiteur. The attempt on the life of Degrelle failed because Demonceau was arrested at his hiding-place in Ixelles together with many associates, British airmen and members of the Belgian London-based Intelligence Service.

It later transpired that the group had been infiltrated by a Belgian collaborator posing as "Captain Jackson", who claimed to be a Canadian airman; the infiltrator's real name was Prosper Dezitter. He might have helped plan the slaying of Colin in order to gain Demonceau's confidence and thus net as many Resistance and other people in hiding as possible. Fraiteur, Demonceau and many fellow members of the Resistance were later executed by the Germans at Breendonk. After the war, Dezitter was arrested in Germany, extradited, condemned to death, and shot by a firing squad at Ixelles on 17 September 1948.

== See also ==
- History of Belgium
- Rexism

== Bibliography ==
- "La peinture belge depuis 1830." Brussels, Editions des cahiers de Belgique,1930
- "Édouard Manet", Paris, Floury, 1932
- "La Peinture européenne au XIXieme siècle: le Romantisme", id., 1935.
