= Robert Poulet =

Belgian writer (1893–1989)

- Born: 4 September 1893; Liège, Belgium
- Died: 6 October 1989 (aged 96); Marly-le-Roi, France
- Occupations: journalist, literary critic, writer

Robert Poulet (4 September 1893 – 6 October 1989) was a Belgian writer, literary critic and journalist. Politically he was a Maurras-inspired integral nationalist who became associated with a collaborationist newspaper during the occupation of Belgium by Nazi Germany.

== Literature ==
Educated at the Faculté des Mines in his hometown, Poulet served in the First World War and before taking odd jobs in Belgium and France. He began writing for several literary reviews in the 1920s and published his first novel, the surrealist Handji, in 1931. He became a part of the 'Groupe du Lundi' that built up around Franz Hellens, which attacked the regional novels prevalent in France then and endorsed magic realism instead. As a literary critic, he became noted for rejecting female authors, dismissing them as midinettes en diable.

== Politics ==
Poulet was involved in politics during the early 1930s when he was a member of the corporatist study group Réaction. Although not altogether enamoured of Nazism he became the 'political director' of Le Nouveau Journal, a collaborationist paper launched by Paul Colin in October 1940. A strong supporter of Belgian independence, he was heavily influenced by Charles Maurras and the Action Française and by 1941, he agreed with Raymond de Becker that a corporatist, authoritarian party of state should be created. His idea was soon abandoned however when the Nazis decide to instead back Léon Degrelle and Rexism, a philosophy to which Poulet was opposed.

Despite all of this Poulet never opposed the Nazis and frequently wrote in support of them during his time at Le Nouveau Journal. He also praised them in their war against the Soviet Union due to his own strict anti-communism. He was sentenced to death in October 1945 for collaboration, after serving six years in prison, ostensibly on 'death row,' he was released and allowed to return to France.

== Later years ==
Following his move to France, he published several autobiographical novels in which he sought to justify his war-time collaboration as merely trying to safeguard the monarchy and Belgian independence. He would also act as a reader at Éditions Denoël and Plon and write for the far right journal Rivarol, the Catholic paper Présent and Ecrits de Paris, amongst other publications. He was a close friend and supporter of Robert Faurisson and joined him in advocating Holocaust denial. Despite Poulet's controversial opinions, famed The Adventures of Tintin cartoonist Hergé, who worked for Poulet during the war, maintained a lifelong friendship with Poulet until Hergé died in 1983. Poulet's autobiography, Ce n'est pas un vie, appeared in 1976. He died in 1989.

== Bibliography ==
- King, Adele (2002). Rereading Camara Laye. Lincoln: University of Nebraska Press. ISBN 978-0-8032-2752-1.
