= Défense de l'Occident =

French neo-fascist magazine

Défense de l’Occident
- Founder: Maurice Bardèche and Jean-Louis Tixier-Vignancour
- Founded: 1952
- First issue: 1952
- Final issue: 1982
- Country: France
- Language: French

Défense de l'Occident (transl. Defense of the West) was a French neo-fascist magazine founded by Maurice Bardèche and Jean-Louis Tixier-Vignancour and published from 1952 to 1982. It was the most significant far-right magazine in post-WWII France, providing an arena for the promotion of neo-fascist ideas and Holocaust denial.

== History ==
The magazine was established by Maurice Bardèche and Jean-Louis Tixier-Vignancour in December 1952. Based in Paris, its original aim was to diffuse ideas of the neo-fascist European Social Movement in France. Promoting historical negationism and anti-Zionism, Défense de l'Occident denounced the épuration légale (the French purge of Nazi collaborators) as the "revenge of the victors". In an article from November 1954, the magazine refuted the idea of the extermination of the Jews during WWII and proposed to relocate the state of Israel in Madagascar in December 1955.

From the 1960s onward, Défense de l’Occident developed a "shape-shifting negationism": it rehabilitated the Vichy regime as "protector of the Jews", condemned the Nuremberg trials as a symbol of injustice, and denounced Israel as a "land stolen from Arabs and billions [of Reichsmark] taken from Germans through the blackmail of 'Nazi war crimes' [quoted in text]".

== Organization ==
The managing editor was Jacques Poillot between 1952 and 1960. Its contributors, mostly unpaid, included Marc Augier, Henry Coston, Paul Rassinier, or François d'Orcival. Défense de l’Occident managed to survived over 30 years despite a limited audience due to the ideological consistency of both its leader Maurice Bardèche and the journal's collaborators, as well as the thematic adaptions of the articles depending on the historical context.
