= Kadmi Cohen =

French author

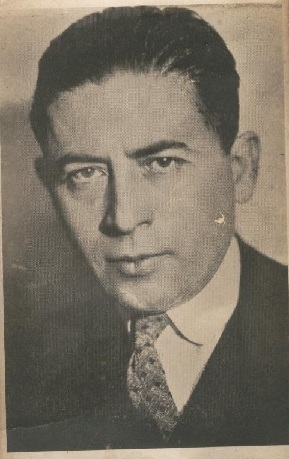
Kadmi Cohen (ca. 1930)

(Isaac) Kadmi Cohen (1892–1944) was a French writer. Born in 1892 in Łódź (Poland), he emigrated to Palestine, where he studied at Lyceum Herzliah in Tel Aviv. In 1914 he joined as a volunteer in the French Foreign Legion. In 1920 he was naturalized French due to his participation in the war.

He was a lawyer and the founder of the Paris Union of young lawyers. In 1922 he discussed a dissertation in philosophy entitled "Introduction à l'histoire des institutions sociales et politiques chez les Sémites". He was an activist in the French Zionist mouvement and was a supporter of Vladimir Jabotinsky's Revisionism. He published numerous articles in "Mercure de France" dealing with Jewish matters and Zionism.

He married a Frenchwoman, who converted to Judaism in the early 1920s. They had 3 children, Olivier Cohen-Steiner (1936–2019), Jean-François Steiner (*1938), and Josée Steiner (*1939). Jean-François Steiner became an author whose book Treblinka: The Revolt of an Extermination Camp helped to define the Nazi Holocaust.

In 1941 Cohen was imprisoned at Compiègne, where he founded a group called Massada supporting the creation of a Jewish state. In 1942 he was released, and he tried to keep in touch with the Vichy Government in order to accomplish his plan. At the beginning of 1944 he was arrested by the Gestapo and deported to Gleiwitz, one of many subcamps of Auschwitz, where he died in June 1944.

== Books ==
- Introduction à l'histoire des institutions sociales et politiques chez les Sémites (1922)
- Nomades (1929)
- L'abomination americaine (1930) E. Flammarion, Paris
- L' etat d'Israel (1930)
