= Jean-François Steiner =

French author

- Front cover of Treblinka: The Revolt of an Extermination Camp by Steiner, ISBN 0452011248
- Born: 17 February 1938 (age 88); Paris, France
- Occupations: Writer, academic
- Writing career
- Genre: World War II history

Jean-François Steiner is a French-Jewish writer born on 17 February 1938 in Paris, France. He is the son of Kadmi Cohen (1892–1944), a French lawyer and writer who died at the concentration camp of Gleiwitz. In 1952 he was adopted, together with his sister Josée Steiner and elder brother Olivier Cohen-Steiner by his mother's second husband, a physician.

He is best known for his controversial non-fiction novel Treblinka: The Revolt of an Extermination Camp first published in 1966 as Treblinka: la révolte d'un camp d'extermination; translated a year later by Helen Weaver for Simon & Schuster. The book is a semi-fictional attempt to lay out the logic of the Nazi concentration camp system and the experiences of the victims who eventually succeeded in revolting against their exterminators in the Treblinka camp. It is written in a third person almost-omniscient way, as the author tries to tie the behavioral conditioning used on the Jews to the narrative perspective of those who endured the violent human experiment. Following outrage among French, Jewish and foreign academics, Steiner agreed to republish his book (which became a bestseller), by presenting it as a fictional account of the Treblinka extermination camp operation. The book remains very popular in France.

Literary scholar Alexandre Prstojevic compared in 2010 the works of Martin Gray, Jean-François Steiner, and Misha Defonseca, saying they are all narratives that cast doubt on the identity of their authors and on their actual presence during the events described.

== Treblinka ==
When asked upon the publication of his book why death camps such as Treblinka had been 'avoided' by his own French contemporaries, Steiner replied: "In Treblinka, as in all the other extermination camps, the Germans had designed 'the machine' (as they referred to the methods of extermination) in such a way that it would almost run itself. It is the Jews who did everything." Professor Samuel Moyn in his Treblinka Affair explained that Steiner claimed to direct his non-fiction novel at the "problem" of the Jews' complicity in a manner reminiscent of parts of Raul Hilberg's Destruction of the European Jews or Hannah Arendt's Eichmann in Jerusalem.

== Works ==
- Treblinka : la révolte d'un camp d'extermination with Preface by Gilles Perrault and Simone de Beauvoir. First published in 1966 by Fayard; 169 editions: 1968, 1970, 1974, 1985, 1994.
- Si Paris..., Paris, Balland, 1970, photographs of Daniel Chaplain.
- Les Métèques, Paris, Fayard, 1970.
- Varsovie 44, l'insurrection, (testimony and documents collected and translated by Jean-François Steiner), Paris, Flammarion, 1975.
- La sémiométrie – Essai de statistique structurale, in collaboration with Ludovic Lebart and Marie Piron, Paris, Dunod, 2003; ISBN 978-2-7021-4681-1.
