= Je suis partout =

French newspaper

- Type: Weekly
- Founded: 20 November 1930
- Ceased publication: 1944
- Language: French

Je suis partout (French pronunciation: [ʒə sɥi paʁtu], lit. I am everywhere) was a French newspaper founded by Joseph-Arthème Fayard, first published on 29 November 1930. It was placed under the direction of Pierre Gaxotte until 1939. Journalists of the paper included Robert Brasillach, Pierre-Antoine Cousteau, Lucien Rebatet, Alain Laubreaux, the illustrator Ralph Soupault, and the Belgian correspondent Pierre Daye. A right-wing publication initially connected to the Action française movement, Je suis partout evolved into an outright fascist publication. During the Nazi occupation of France, it became a collaborationist newspaper.

== Interwar ==
In its very beginning, Je suis partout was centered on covering international topics, without displaying extremism, antisemitism, or even a consistently right-wing approach. However, the group of editors was heavily influenced by the ideas of Charles Maurras and the integralist Action française, and the ideology quickly spilled into the editorial content, as the more moderate journalists quit in protest.

The paper became a staple of anti-parliamentarianism, nationalism, and criticism of "decadent" Third Republic institutions and culture, becoming close to fascist movements of the era, French and foreign alike. It clearly supported Benito Mussolini as of October 1932, when Italian politics were awarded a special issue. Je suis partout was favorable to the Spanish Falange, the Romanian Iron Guard, the Belgian Léon Degrelle's Rexism, as well as to Oswald Mosley and his British Union of Fascists. From 1936, it also broke ranks with Maurras, profoundly anti-German, and began to open up to Nazism and to Adolf Hitler.

Despite its international connections, Je suis partout did not recommend copying over local origin in establishing a Fascist régime: "We will look at foreign fascism only through French fascism, the only real fascism" (14 April 1939). As such, the newspaper praised Jacques Doriot for his attempts to unite the French far right into a single Front.

The antisemitic rhetoric of the paper greatly increased after the Stavisky Affair and the far-right rally it occasioned in front of the Palais Bourbon. The 6 February 1934 crisis was the riot that some thought at the time was intended as a coup d'état. The paper became more and more vitriolic after the formation of the left-wing Popular Front government under the Jewish Prime Minister Léon Blum (1936). From 1938 on, Je suis partout matched the racist propaganda in Nazi Germany by publishing two special issues, Les Juifs ("The Jews") and Les Juifs et la France ("The Jews and France"). The publisher Jean Fayard cut ties with the paper in 1936, and it was sold to a new board – which included the Argentine Charles Lescat (who was, according to his own depiction, "a fascist as genuine as he is calm"). Shortly before World War II and the German occupation in 1940, the paper was banned.

== Collaboration ==
It began publication again the following year. Its ultra-collaborationist stances attracted the criticism of Maurras, who repudiated the paper. Je suis partout published calls for the murder of Jews and Third Republic political figures: "The death of men to which we owe so many mournings... all French people are demanding it" (6 September 1941). It exercised an increasing influence over a young, intellectual audience, going from around 50,000 issues before the war to 300,000 in 1943.

Robert Brasillach was its editor-in-chief from June 1937 to September 1943. Brasillach was replaced by Pierre-Antoine Cousteau. Cousteau aligned Je suis partout with the Nazi leadership, went against its roots by adhering to Nazi anti-intellectualism, and opened itself to advertising for the Waffen-SS and the Légion des Volontaires Français. Several of its editors joined either the French Popular Party or the Milice. It continued to be published as late as August 1944.

During the épuration after the war, Brasillach was tried and executed on 6 February 1945 for treason, due to his role at the paper. The rest of the publication team was tried and condemned collectively as a single moral entity.
