= Lucien Rebatet =

French writer and journalist

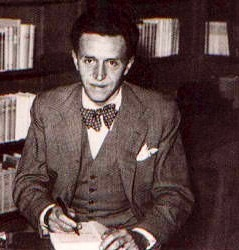
- Born: 15 November 1903; Moras-en-Valloire, France
- Died: 24 August 1972 (aged 68); Moras-en-Valloire, France
- Other name: François Vinneuil
- Occupations: journalist, author

Lucien Rebatet (15 November 1903 – 24 August 1972) was a French author, journalist, and political activist. He began his career in journalism at L'Action française, then became a contributor to Je suis partout and affirmed himself as a fascist sympathizer. During World War II and the occupation of France, he became a Nazi collaborator: his book Les Décombres, where he discussed his support for Nazism, promoted antisemitism and heavily criticized the traditional French far right, became a best-seller in 1942. After the war he received a death sentence, which was commuted. In 1952, he published the novel Les Deux Étendards.

== Biography ==
=== Early life ===
Rebatet was born and died in Moras-en-Valloire, Drôme. As a young man, Rebatet was educated in Saint-Chamond, Loire. From 1923 to 1927 he studied at the Sorbonne, after which he became an insurance agent. It was only in 1929 that he began his career as a writer, becoming a music and film critic (the latter under the pseudonym François Vinneuil) for the far right integralist L'Action française newspaper. In 1932 Rebatet became a contributor to the right-wing newspaper Je suis partout ("I Am Everywhere"), for which he wrote until the Allied liberation in 1944. In 1938 he became head of information for Action Française and worked closely with the movement's founder, Charles Maurras.

Long before the outbreak of war between France and Nazi Germany, Rebatet expressed sympathy for National Socialism, notably in his articles for Je suis partout, in which he accused Jews of fomenting a war to topple Adolf Hitler's régime. In 1940 he was drafted into the French Army and, although he served, openly hoped for a "short and disastrous war for France".

=== Collaboration ===
After the fall of France he became a radio reporter for the Vichy government. He soon left this post, as well as Action Française, to join Jacques Doriot's newspaper Cri Du Peuple, and to continue his writings for Je suis partout.

In 1942 Rebatet published a lengthy pamphlet entitled Les Décombres ("The Ruins"), in which he traced the forces he believed to have led France to its fall. He firmly accused Third Republic politicians and its military leadership, as well as French Jews - who he claimed were the prime cause of France's political and military woes. Les Décombres is the clearest expression of Rebatet's fascism, as well as his most antisemitic work. The same year, he began writing Les Deux étendards ("The Two Standards"), his first novel.

In August 1944 Rebatet fled France for Germany, travelling to the Sigmaringen enclave (place of refuge for Vichy authorities as well as the more famous French writer, Céline). It was in Sigmaringen that Rebatet completed Les Deux étendards, which would be published in 1952 by Gallimard. He was arrested in Austria in 1945.

=== After the war ===
Rebatet was sent back to France and, in 1946, received a death sentence, which was commuted to forced labor the next year. Released from prison in 1952, he returned to journalism in 1953, becoming the director of the literary section of Dimanche Matin. In 1954, Gallimard published Rebatet's second novel, Les Épis Mûrs ("The Ripe Grains"). His final work was a history of music which he began writing in 1965, and which was published by Laffont in 1969.

Although Rebatet continued to proclaim his adherence to fascism until his death, his antisemitism became less pronounced after the war, and he later came to admire the State of Israel. In 1967, he admitted: "The cause of Israel over there is that of all Westerners. It would have surprised me if I had been prophesied in 1939 that I would one day wish for the victory of a Zionist army. But this is the solution that I find reasonable today." In 1969, he also observed: "savor the historical paradox that led the Jews of Israel to defend all the patriotic, moral, military values that they most violently fought during a century in their adopted country."

Despite his controversial biography, there are those, such as George Steiner, who claim that Lucien Rebatet was a great writer, and that Les Deux étendards in particular deserves to be considered an important novel in French literary history.

== Cultural references ==
- Rebatet is depicted in Jonathan Littell's historical novel Les Bienveillantes, where he is a friend of the main character Maximilian Aue.
