= Robert Brasillach =

French author, journalist, and convicted traitor (1909–1945)

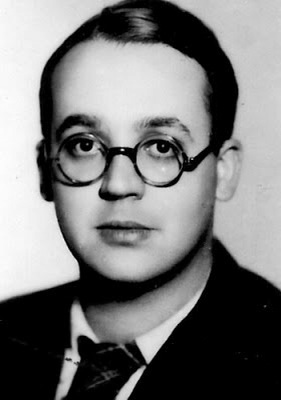
- Robert Brasillach (1938)
- Born: 31 March 1909; Perpignan, France
- Died: 6 February 1945 (aged 35); Fort de Montrouge, Arcueil, France
- Cause of death: Execution by firing squad
- Occupations: Journalist, author
- Conviction: Treason
- Penalty: Death

Robert Brasillach (French: [ʁɔbɛʁ bʁazijak]; 31 March 1909 – 6 February 1945) was a French author and journalist. He was the editor of Je suis partout, a nationalist newspaper which advocated fascist movements and supported Jacques Doriot. After the liberation of France in 1944, he was executed following a trial and Charles de Gaulle's express refusal to grant him a pardon. Brasillach was de facto executed for advocating collaborationism, denunciation and incitement to genocide. The execution remains a subject of some controversy, insofar as some of the execution involved adding to the popular opprobrium against persons selected to be killed by Vichy France and their Nazi Germany allies amid wider "intellectual crimes", rather than military or political actions. Brasillach and Pierre Laval called for the ultimately life-ending show trial of prominent politician Georges Mandel, who had been praised by Winston Churchill for trying to lead Free French Forces.

== Biography ==
Robert Brasillach was born in Perpignan on 31 March 1909, the son of Lieutenant Arthémile Brasillach, who served in the colonial regiment of Marshall Lyautey in Morocco, and Marguerite Brasillach, née Redo. He studied at the École normale supérieure, at the time a school of the University of Paris, and then became a novelist and literary critic for the Action française of Charles Maurras. After the 6 February 1934 crisis in the Place de la Concorde, Brasillach openly supported fascism. His politics are shared by several of the protagonists in his literary works, notably the two male main characters in The Seven Colours.

=== Author ===
Brasillach wrote both fiction and non-fiction. While his fiction dealt with love, life and politics in his era, his non-fiction dealt with a great variety of themes, ranging from drama, great literary figures and contemporary world events. His work in the realm of cinema history was particularly influential.

==== Cinema ====
Brasillach was fascinated by the cinema and in 1935 co-wrote a detailed critical history of that medium, Histoire du cinéma (re-edited in 1943), with his brother-in-law, Maurice Bardèche. This work remained the "most prominent aesthetic history of film for at least a decade", and a work that exerted considerable influence, via its impact on Georges Sadoul (who nonetheless disliked the authors) until the 1970s. Unlike several other authors and critics of the time, Brasillach did not see cinema through an overtly political lens, although the 1943 edition of his work did contain anti-Semitic comments not present in the original. Despite being fervent nationalists and personally believing that each nation and people had a unique cinema, the authors instead focused on international trends rather than local particularities. Brasillach frequented Henri Langlois' Cercle du cinéma (Cinema Circle). His personal tastes are detailed in his writings of the period. These tastes ranged from Soviet cinema (Battleship Potemkin and Alexander Nevski) to film-makers Charlie Chaplin, G.W. Pabst, René Clair and Jean Renoir and to some Hollywood films from directors such as John Ford, Frank Borzage and King Vidor. Brasillach was drawn to originality and explored foreign cinema, and became the first major critic in France to address Japanese cinema, the work of Yasujirō Ozu, Kenji Mizoguchi and Heinosuke Gosho. While in prison, he worked on a third edition of his work on cinema and began to adapt a work on Falstaff which he hoped to film with Raimu.

=== Politics and wartime activities ===
He became an editor of Je suis partout, a fascist paper founded by dissidents from the Action Française and led by Pierre Gaxotte. Brasillach was attracted to the fascistic Rexist movement in Belgium, and wrote an article and later a book about the leader of the movement, Leon Degrelle. Brasillach admired what he perceived to be Degrelle's youth and charisma and Degrelle's insistence on being neither left nor right, supporting striking workers, encouraging love of God, the King and family and desiring to see the establishment of an anti-communist and anti-capitalist, Christian-influenced corporate state. Degrelle collaborated with the German occupation of Belgium and served in the Waffen-SS. Brasillach was also greatly impressed by José Antonio Primo de Rivera and his Falangist movement. By contrast, he described Mein Kampf as a "masterpiece of cretinism" in which Hitler appeared to be "a sort of enraged teacher."

A soldier in 1940, Brasillach was captured by the Germans and held prisoner for several months after the fall of France. At his trial, the prosecution alleged that his release was due to pro-German articles written while in captivity. He was freed in early 1941 and returned to his editorial role at Je suis partout. He wrote in favour of the Vichy regime but later embraced a more committed germanophile policy of collaboration and Nazi policies and began to criticize the Vichy state. He joined a group of French authors and artists in a trip to meet with German counterparts in Weimar and in November 1942 he supported the German militarisation of the unoccupied zone (Case Anton) under the Vichy government because it "reunited France".

He visited the site of the Katyn massacre, toured the Eastern Front, visited Legion of French Volunteers Against Bolshevism and wrote, on his return to France, that he had gone from embracing a collaboration due to reason and rationality to being a collaborator for reasons of the heart ("De collaborationiste de raison, je suis devenu collaborationiste de coeur"). He published the names and addresses of Jews who had gone into hiding, called for the death of left-wing politicians, and in the summer of 1944 signed the call for the summary execution of all members of the French Resistance. He considered himself a "moderate" antisemite and was replaced as editor of Je suis partout in 1943 by the even more extreme Pierre-Antoine Cousteau. He was a member of the Groupe Collaboration, an initiative that encouraged close cultural ties between France and Germany. He worked for various journals, including Révolution nationale and le Petit Parisien. After the liberation of Paris, Brasillach hid in an attic, joking in his diary: "Jews have been living in cupboards for four years, why not imitate them?" He surrendered on 14 September when he heard that his mother had been arrested. He spent the next five months in prison and continued his literary endeavours while incarcerated.

=== Trial and execution ===
Brasillach was tried in Paris on 19 January 1945. The trial judge had served under Vichy. The prosecutor reiterated Brasillach's vehement antisemitism, linked his praise of Germany and denunciation of the Resistance to SS massacres in France and played upon homophobic sentiments by repeatedly drawing the jurors' attention to the author's homosexuality (alleged, but denied by those who knew him best), noting, inter alia, that he had slept with the enemy and approved of Germany's "penetration" of France. In so doing, the prosecution was making hay with Brasillach's own words, as he had suggested, as Liberation approached, that France had slept with Germany and would remember the experience fondly. Brasillach was sentenced to death. Brasillach responded to the outrage of some of his supporters then in attendance by saying "It's an honour!"

The death sentence caused an uproar in French literary circles and even some of Brasillach's political opponents protested. Resistance member and author François Mauriac, whom Brasillach had savaged in the press, circulated a petition to Charles de Gaulle to commute the sentence. This petition was signed by many of the leading lights of the French literary world, including Paul Valéry, Paul Claudel, Albert Camus, Jean Cocteau, Colette, Arthur Honegger, Jean Anouilh and Thierry Maulnier; others, such as Jean Paul Sartre and Simone de Beauvoir circulated their own counter-petitions. De Gaulle did not comply and Brasillach was executed by firing squad in Montrouge. De Gaulle's only comment on the matter was "In literature as in everything talent confers responsibility." It has been argued that De Gaulle refused to spare Brasillach because the author had on numerous occasions called for Georges Mandel's execution. De Gaulle admired Mandel, a prominent conservative politician (who happened to be Jewish), and who was murdered by the Milice during the closing days of the Occupation. Brasillach called out "All the same, long live France!" ("Vive la France quand même!") immediately before the shots of the firing squad. His body was buried in the cimetière de Charonne in the 20th Arrondissement of Paris. The body of his brother-in-law, Maurice Bardèche, was later buried next to him.

=== Legacy ===
Brasillach sought to protect his own legacy as his life drew to a close. He composed several works while awaiting trial and execution, including a collection of verse and a letter to French youth of the future, explaining and justifying his actions (Lettre à un soldat de la classe de soixante). In Lettre, he was unrepentant about his fascism, his anti-Semitism or his wartime activity, although he insisted that he had no idea that deported French Jews were being murdered.

Brasillach's trial and execution inspired Simone de Beauvoir's essay "An Eye for an Eye", in which she defended the role of emotion (especially hatred) in politics and the role of revenge in punishment.

His biographer Alice Kaplan noted that his death made him the "James Dean of French fascism" and a martyr to the extreme right. François Truffaut was both aware and appreciative of Brasillach, stating that Brasillach and Pierre Drieu La Rochelle shared similar political beliefs and that "views that earn their advocates the death penalty are bound to be worthy of esteem."

Dominique Venner's Nouvelle Revue d'Histoire has praised the author's intellectual oeuvre.

A group called Association des Amis de Robert Brasillach celebrates the author's work and legacy.

==== Cultural references ====
- The Jean-Luc Godard film Éloge de l'amour features the recitation of Brasillach's "Testament", written before his execution.
- Brasillach is described in Jonathan Littell's novel Les Bienveillantes, where he is one of the fellow students of the main character Maximilian Aue.
- Twentieth century French composer Denise Roger used Brasillach's texts in some of her songs.
- French black metal band Peste Noire dedicated "Psaume IV" from the album Folkfuck Folie to Brasillach.
- In Rachel Kushner's 2008 novel, "Telex from Cuba", Fidel Castro's 1959 "radically unstable" idealism is compared to Brasillach.

== Works ==
=== Novels ===
- 1932 Le Voleur d'étincelles (The Spark Thief/The Stealer of Sparks)
- 1934 L'Enfant de la nuit (Child of the Night)
- 1936 Le Marchand d'oiseaux (The Bird Merchant)
- 1936 Les Cadets de l'Alcazar (with Henri Massis) (The Cadets of the Alcazar); later renamed the Defenders of the Alcazar
- 1937 Comme le temps passe (How The Time Passes By), nominated for Prix Femina 1937
- 1939 Les Sept Couleurs (The Seven Colors), nominated for Prix Goncourt 1939.
- 1943 La Conquérante (The Conqueror; gender suggests a female conqueror)
- 1944 Poèmes (Poems)

=== Non-fiction ===
- 1931 Présence de Virgile (The Presence of Virgil)
- 1932 Le Procès de Jeanne d'Arc (edited and introduced by Robert Brasillach) (The Trial of Joan of Arc)
- 1935 Portraits. Barrès, Proust, Maurras, Colette, Giraudoux, Morand, Cocteau, Malraux, etc., (Portraits)
- 1935 (re-edited in 1943) Histoire du Cinéma, two volumes (with Maurice Bardèche)
- 1936, Animateurs de théâtre (Theater Directors/Organizers)
- 1936 Léon Degrelle et l'avenir de « Rex » (Léon Degrelle and the Future of the Rexist Party)
- 1938 Pierre Corneille, a biography of the famous dramatist
- 1939 Histoire de la guerre d’Espagne (with Maurice Bardèche) (History of the Spanish Civil War)
- 1941 Notre avant-guerre (Our pre-war)
- 1944 Les Quatre Jeudis (The Four Thursdays) A series of articles about literature, literary figures, trends, politics and society largely published in the press earlier in Brasillach's career (drawn from articles often originally printed on Thursdays).

=== Posthumously published works ===
- 1945 Poèmes de Fresnes
- 1946 Lettre à un soldat de la classe 60 (Letter to a Soldier of the Class of 1960).
- 1947 Chénier, La Pensée française (Chénier: French Thought)
- 1950 Anthologie de la poésie grecque (Anthology of Greek Poetry) ISBN 2-253-01517-2
- 1952 Lettres écrites en prison (Letters Written in Prison)
- 1953 Six heures à perdre (Six Hours to Kill)
- 1954 Bérénice (Berenice) (play, first run - 1957)
- 1955 Journal d'un homme occupé (Journal of a (Pre)Occupied Man)
- 1961 Poètes oubliés (Forgotten Poets)
- 1961 Dom Rémy
- 1962 Commentaire sur La Varende (Commentary on La Varende)
- 1963 En marge de Daphnis et Chloé (On the Edge of Daphnis and Chloé)
- 1963 Nouvelle prière sur l'Acropole (New Prayer on the Acropolis)
- 1967 Écrit à Fresnes (Written at Fresnes)
- 1968 Une génération dans l'orage (A Generation in the Storm)
- 1970 Vingt lettres de Robert Brasillach (Twenty Letters)
- 1971 Abel Bonnard biography
- 1974 Les Captifs incomplete novel
- 1984 Le Paris de Balzac (Balzac's Paris)
- 1985 Hugo et le snobisme révolutionnaire (Hugo and Revolutionary Snobbism)
- 1985 Montherlant entre les hommes et les femmes (Montherlant between Men and Women)
- 1992 Fulgur novel, compilation
- 1999 La Question juive, articles de Brasillach et Cousteau (The Jewish Question: Articles by Brasillach and Cousteau)
- 2002 Relectures Robert Brasillach (Re-reading Robert Brasillach)
- 2003 Animateurs de théâtre: Baty, Copeau, Dullin, Jouvet, les Pitoëff, Éditions Complexe, Bruxelles (reissue with preface and notes by Chantal Meyer-Plantureux)
- 2020 Traductions de Shakespeare, Éditions Pardès
- 2023 Lettres à une provinciale, collection of articles, Les Sept Couleurs (pref. Philippe d'Hugues), (lire en ligne)
- 2025 Les Vacances, unpublished posthumous novel, Les Sept Couleurs, 248 p. (pref. Philippe d'Hugues, postface & notes Alain Lanavère) ISBN 978-2970168263
