= Alice Kaplan =

American scholar of French literature (born 1954)

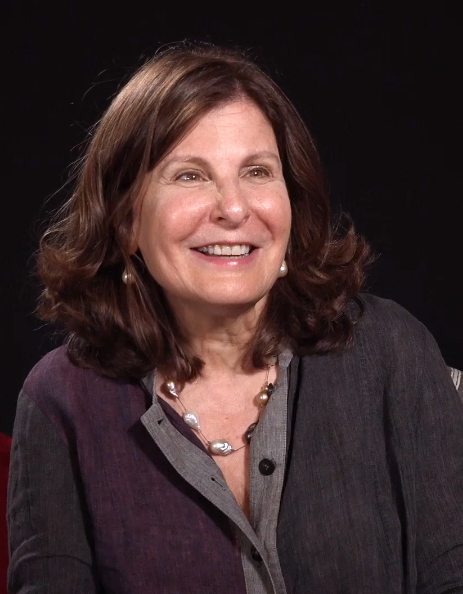
- In a 2024 interview
- Born: June 22, 1954 (age 72); Minneapolis, Minnesota, U.S.
- Occupations: Literary scholar, historian, writer
- Awards: Los Angeles Times Book Prize for History

Academic background
- Education: University of California, Berkeley (BA, 1975); Yale University (PhD, 1981)

Academic work
- Institutions: Duke University; Yale University
- Main interests: Twentieth-century French literature, post-war French culture, translation theory

Alice Yaeger Kaplan (born June 22, 1954) is an American scholar of French literature. She is the Sterling Professor of French at Yale University and has written extensively on 20th-century French literature, history, and intellectual life.

== Early life and education ==
Alice Kaplan was born on June 22, 1954, in Minneapolis, the youngest of three children. Her father Sidney J. Kaplan, an attorney who had served as a prosecutor at the Nuremberg trials, died when she was seven. She attended the Northrop Collegiate School. When she was fifteen her mother, Leonore Kaplan, a social worker and Francophile, sent her to the Collège du Léman in Versoix, Switzerland, for a year to learn French.

She attended Vassar College and graduated Phi Beta Kappa from the University of California, Berkeley, with a major in French and a junior year abroad in Bordeaux. She completed her Ph.D. in French with a minor in philosophy at Yale University in 1981.

== Career ==
Kaplan served as an assistant professor at North Carolina State University and at Columbia University before becoming the Gilbert, Louis and Edward Lehrman Professor of Romance Studies and Professor of Literature and History at Duke University and founding director of the Center for French and Francophone Studies there.

She joined the Yale University faculty in 2008 and was named the John M. Musser Professor of French. She has served as the chair of the Department of French; the director of the Whitney Humanities Center; and the director of the Yale Translation Initiative at the MacMillan Center, which she founded together with Harold Augenbraum in 2018. In 2019, she was named Sterling Professor of French.

Kaplan's research interests include autobiography and memory, translation in theory and practice, literature and the law, twentieth-century French literature, French cultural studies, and post-war French culture. Her undergraduate and graduate teaching includes courses on Albert Camus; war and memory; fiction in archives; existentialist thought and literature; French cinema of the Occupation; and a lecture course on the modern French novel (co-taught with Maurice Samuels).

== Awards and honors ==
Kaplan's memoir, French Lessons (1993), was a finalist for the National Book Critics Circle Award for Biography and was named a New York Times Notable Book. Her book The Collaborator: The Trial and Execution of Robert Brasillach (2000) received the Los Angeles Times Book Prize for History, and was a finalist for the National Book Critics Circle Award for Nonfiction and the National Book Award, which praised the book as the "definitive account of Brasillach's crime and punishment." It was also listed as a New York Times Notable Book and an American Library Association Notable Book. The Interpreter (2005) received the Henry Adams Prize from the Society for History in the Federal Government.

Looking for The Stranger: Albert Camus and the Life of a Literary Classic (2016) was a finalist for the National Book Critics Circle Award for Criticism, the Prix Médicis essai, and the Grand Prix des lectrices de Elle. It was also a New York Times Notable Book of 2017 and received the Gustav Ranis International Book Prize from Yale's MacMillan Center. Her 2024 book Baya ou le grand vernissage received an honorable mention from the Prix Littéraire Fetkann! Maryse Condé. In 2025, she received Le Prix special de l'Académie des Jeux floraux for her collective oeuvre.

Kaplan is a former Guggenheim Fellow (1994), a member of the American Academy of Arts and Sciences (2009), and a recipient of the French Legion of Honour (2013). In 2001, she was appointed an Officer in the Ordre des Palmes académiques by the French Ministry of National Education. She was a trustee of the Camargo Foundation in Cassis, France, and has held fellowships from the Stanford Humanities Center and the National Humanities Center.

== Public engagement ==
Kaplan has contributed to publications such as The New York Review of Books, The Nation, and The Paris Review. She has lectured in the U.S., France, and Algeria, discussing topics like translation, memory, and French-Algerian history.

She has served as a judge for several literary prizes, including the National Book Award and the American Library in Paris Book Award, and currently serves on the selection committee for the Albertine Foundation Literature and Translation Grant. She was a member of the usage panel of the American Heritage Dictionary from 1997 until 2018, when the panel stopped its activity.

Kaplan is a founding member of the MaisonDAR collective, a multidisciplinary space dedicated to fostering reflection, creation and practice among artists and researchers in Algiers. She participated with the other members of that group in the "Champs des Possibles" project, which offered workshops and internships in cinema, photography, and literature. Her book group, "Lioum Adab," began in 2022 as part of that project, and has continued beyond.

== Selected works ==
=== Books ===
- Kaplan, Alice. Seeing Baya: Portrait of an Algerian Artist in Paris. Chicago: University of Chicago Press, 2024. Translated as Baya ou le grand vernissage, trans. Patrick Hersant. Marseille: Le Bruit du Monde, and Algiers: Éditions Barzakh, 2024.
- Kaplan, Alice. States of Plague: Reading Albert Camus in a Pandemic. Co-authored with Laura Marris. Chicago: University of Chicago Press, 2022. Translated as État de peste: Lire Camus à l’heure de la pandémie, trans. Patrick Hersant. Paris: Gallimard/Arcades, 2023.
- Kaplan, Alice. Maison Atlas: Roman, trans. Patrick Hersant. Marseille: Le Bruit du Monde, and Algiers: Éditions Barzakh, 2022.
- Kaplan, Alice. Turbulences, USA (2016–2020). Paris: Gallimard/Collections Tracts, Série Grand Format, 2020.
- Kaplan, Alice. Looking for The Stranger: Albert Camus and the Life of a Literary Classic. Chicago: University of Chicago Press, 2016. Translated as En quête de L’Étranger, trans. Patrick Hersant. Paris: Gallimard, 2016.
- Kaplan, Alice. Dreaming in French: The Paris Years of Jacqueline Bouvier Kennedy, Susan Sontag, and Angela Davis. Chicago: University of Chicago Press, 2012. Translated as Trois américaines à Paris, trans. Patrick Hersant. Paris: Gallimard, 2012.
- Kaplan, Alice. The Interpreter. New York: The Free Press, 2005. Translated as L’Interprète, trans. Patrick Hersant. Paris: Gallimard, 2007.
- Kaplan, Alice. The Collaborator: The Trial and Execution of Robert Brasillach. Chicago: University of Chicago Press, 2000.
  - French translation: Intelligence avec l’ennemi: Le procès de Robert Brasillach, trans. Bruno Poncharal. Paris: Gallimard, 2001.
  - Italian translation: Il collaboratore: Processo e morte di un fascista, trans. Giuseppe Balestrino. Bologna: Società editrice il Mulino, 2002.
  - Greek translation; rpt. The Legal Classics Library, 2006.
  - Spanish translation: El caso Brasillach: La Francia collabo ante el Espejo, trans. Francisco Campillo. Madrid: Fórcola Ediciones, 2025.
- Kaplan, Alice. French Lessons: A Memoir. Chicago and London: University of Chicago Press, 1993. New edition with afterword by the author, 2018.
- Kaplan, Alice. Relevé des sources et citations dans "Bagatelles pour un massacre". Tusson (Charente): Éditions du Lérot, 1987.
- Kaplan, Alice. Reproductions of Banality: Fascism, Literature and French Intellectual Life. Foreword by Russell Berman. Minneapolis: University of Minnesota Press, 1986.

=== Edited volumes ===
- Camus, Albert. Travels in the Americas: Notes and Impressions of a New World. Edited and with an introduction by Alice Kaplan. Translated by Ryan Bloom. Chicago: University of Chicago Press, 2023.
- Camus, Albert. Personal Writings. Edited with a foreword by Alice Kaplan. New York: Knopf, 2020.
- Camus, Albert. Committed Writings. Edited with a foreword by Alice Kaplan. New York: Knopf, 2020.
- Camus, Albert. Algerian Chronicles. Edited with an introduction by Alice Kaplan, translated by Arthur Goldhammer. Cambridge: Harvard University Press, 2013.
- Céline, Louis-Ferdinand. USA. Edited with an introduction by Alice Kaplan and Philippe Roussin. South Atlantic Quarterly. Durham: Duke University Press, Spring 1994.
- Kaplan, Alice and Ross, Kristin, eds. Everyday Life. Yale French Studies, Vol. 73. New Haven: Yale University Press, Fall 1987.
- Kaplan, Alice, ed. Anti-Semite and Jew: The Aesthetics and Politics of an Ethnic Identity. SubStance 49 (Vol. XV, No. 1). Madison: University of Wisconsin Press, 1986.

=== Prefaces and introductions ===
- Guilloux, Louis. Blood Dark. Introduction by Alice Kaplan. New York: NYRB Classics, 2017. Also in The New Republic (digital edition, October 19, 2017).
- Ferrandez, Jacques. Le premier homme. Introduction by Alice Kaplan. Paris: Gallimard, 2017. English trans. Ryan Bloom, Pegasus Books.
- Bloch-Dano, Evelyne. Paper Gardens. Translated by Theresa Lavender Fagan, foreword by Alice Kaplan. Charlottesville: University of Virginia Press, 2018.
- Sarraute, Nathalie. Childhood, trans. Barbara Bray. Preface by Alice Kaplan. Chicago: University of Chicago Press, 2013.

=== Selected translations from the French ===
- Toumi, Samir. Alger le cri. Translated by Alice Kaplan. The Yale Review 107 (1), January 2019.
- Grenier, Roger. Palace of Books. Translated and with a foreword by Alice Kaplan. Chicago: University of Chicago Press, 2016.
- Grenier, Roger. A Box of Photographs. Translated by Alice Kaplan. Chicago: University of Chicago Press, 2013.
- Grenier, Roger. The Difficulty of Being a Dog. Translated by Alice Kaplan. Chicago: University of Chicago Press, 2009.
- Guilloux, Louis. OK, Joe. Translated and with an introduction by Alice Kaplan. Chicago: University of Chicago Press, 2003.
- Bloch-Dano, Evelyne. Madame Proust: A Biography. Translated by Alice Kaplan. Chicago: University of Chicago Press, 2003.
- Grenier, Roger. Another November / Le Pierrot Noir. Translated by Alice Yaeger Kaplan. New York: The New Press, 1998.
