= May 9 Committee =

French far-right informal group

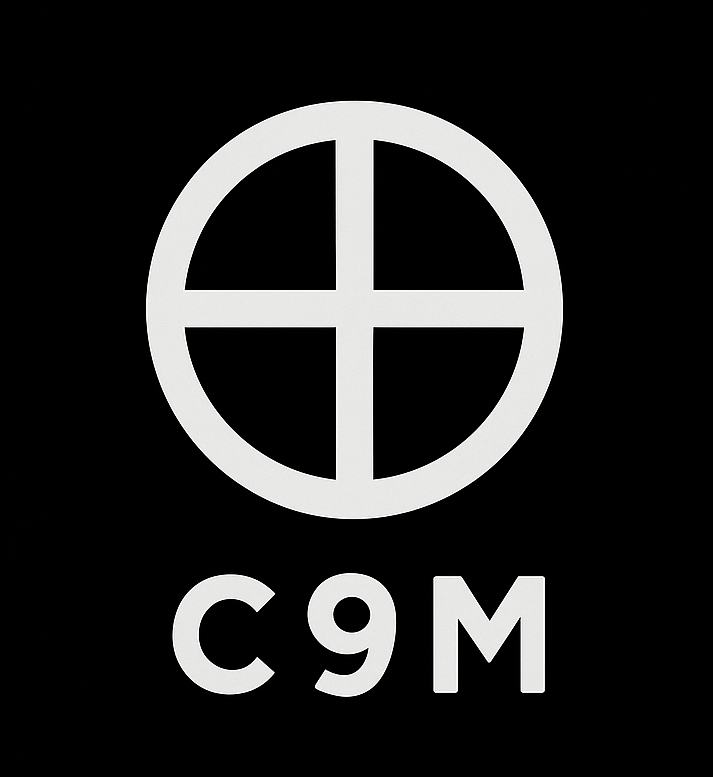
C9M logo

The 9 May Committee (C9M, in French: Comité du 9-Mai) is a French far-right informal group created in 1994 following the death of Sébastien Deyzieu, a 22-year-old nationalist activist who fell from a building on 7 May 1994 while trying to escape from police during a banned demonstration in Paris. Initially founded by the Groupe Union Défense (GUD), the Front National de la Jeunesse (FNJ) and the Jeunesses Nationalistes Révolutionnaires (JNR), the C9M has organized an annual commemoration in Paris ever since.

Over the years, the structure brought together various nationalist, neo-fascist and neo-Nazi movements. The organization of these events was taken over by the Bloc identitaire in the mid-2000s, then recovered by the JNR before they were disbanded. It was then taken over by Social Bastion and Zouaves Paris (ZVP), both successors to the GUD, in 2017. Following the dissolution of Bastion Social in 2019, the organization was taken over by L'Alvarium, ZVP and several satellite organizations of Social Bastion, and has been headed by Marc de Cacqueray-Valménier since 2023.

These gatherings fell into decline during the 2000s, before experiencing a resurgence following their revival by Social Bastion and ZVP. They have sometimes been banned by the authorities, and are the subject of anti-fascist counter-demonstrations.

== Context ==
On 7 May 1994, the Groupe Union Défense (GUD) and the Jeunesses Nationalistes Révolutionnaires (JNR) organized a demonstration in Paris entitled "Bienvenue aux ennemis de l'Europe !" ("Welcome to Europe's enemies!") to criticize US imperialism, particularly in the run-up to the commemoration of the 50th anniversary of the Normandy landings. The event was initially scheduled for 17:00 at Place Denfert-Rochereau.

As the demonstration had been banned by the Paris police prefect, Philippe Massoni, the police were out in force on the Place Denfert-Rochereau, the planned venue for the demonstration. After clashes, 107 demonstrators were arrested, and only a few managed to escape from the police. After a chase, Sébastien Deyzieu, an activist with L'Œuvre Française, tried to escape by climbing into a building, but fell to his death between the fourth and fifth floors of 4, rue des Chartreux.

According to the demonstration's organizers, "some of the testimonies gathered may point to a police provocation used to credit a minister, Mr. Pasqua, with being an anti-fascist fighter".

== Inception ==
Following these events, the C9M was created by the GUD, the Front National de la Jeunesse and the Jeunesses Nationalistes Révolutionnaires to honor Deyzieu's death. The C9M attempted to invade the Minister of the Interior's apartment, then invaded the Fun Radio offices with handguns and demanded Charles Pasqua's resignation on air. On 16 May at 19:00, the C9M organized a demonstration in Place Denfert-Rochereau with L'Œuvre française and the National Front. Seven activists were sentenced to two to three years' deprivation of civil rights for the invasion of the radio station. Marine Le Pen, Philippe Péninque and Jean-Pierre Emié defended these activists at their appeal trial.

== Organization ==
The C9M is an informal group made up of several far-right movements, bringing together nationalists, neo-fascists and neo-Nazis at the turn of the 2020s.

Following the 1994 events, the C9M has organized a commemorative march every 9th of May. It takes the form of a torchlight procession from the Esplanade de l'Observatoire, near the Port-Royal station, to the Rue des Chartreux.

In 2005, the rally was organized by the Bloc Identitaire. In 2009, Serge Ayoub took over the organization of the C9M. His Jeunesses Nationalistes Révolutionnaires took charge of the security detail. Following the dissolution of his organizations JNR and Third Way after the Clément Méric affair in 2013, Serge Ayoub stopped organizing these gatherings.

In December 2017, the C9M was taken over by Social Bastion and Zouaves Paris, two organizations that emerged from the GUD after its dissolution. With Social Bastion disbanded in 2019, its satellite organizations took over the organization of the parade, alongside ZVP and L'Alvarium. In 2023, the C9M organization was taken over by Marc de Cacqueray-Valménier. That same year, after the parade in Paris, the rally continued in Saint-Cyr-l'École, where a neo-Nazi rock concert was held.

== Participants ==
In 2007, the rally was reinforced by Paris Saint-Germain (PSG) football supporters who came to commemorate, in addition to the death of Sébastien Deyzieu, the death of Julien Quemener, a supporter killed by a policeman after a match between PSG and Hapoel Tel Aviv.

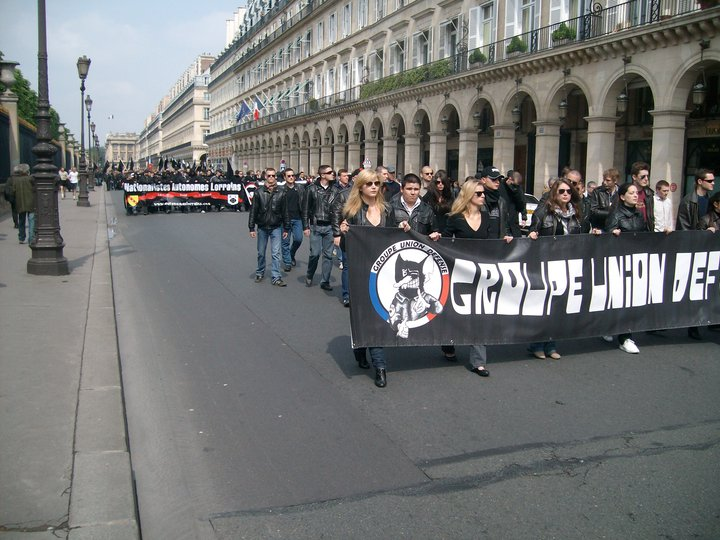
The GUD at the C9M march in 2010

In 2010, several political movements, including former Alsatian MP Robert Spieler's Nouvelle Droite Populaire, Pierre Vial's Terre et Peuple, the Nationalistes Autonomes de Lorraine, the French Renewal, the GUD and Serge Ayoub's Jeunesses Nationalistes Révolutionnaires, took part in the demonstration. In 2018, activists from the Italian neo-fascist organization CasaPound took part in the march. This was also the first year that the Social Bastion took part in the Paris demonstration. In 2019, France-Soir noted the absence of Alexandre Gabriac, a former regular at these gatherings, as well as Yvan Benedetti, president of L'Œuvre Française, of which Sébastien Deyzieu was a member. In 2022, the parade included L'Alvarium, the Rassemblement Étudiant de Droite, and members of the Collectif Némésis. In 2023, the violent neo-Nazi group Division Martel took part in the security detail and assaulted a passer-by alongside the demonstration. Several nationalist-revolutionary activists also took part in the rally. Among the demonstrators were also alleged associates of Marine Le Pen Axel Loustau and Olivier Dugue. Interviewed on the matter by Sud Radio, Marine Le Pen denied, however, that the people involved were close to her, and disassociated herself from the demonstration.

In 2025, militants from Hungary, Germany, Italy and Spain joined the parade. Also present were Marc de Cacqueray-Valménier, a leading figure in the nationalist-revolutionary movement, Jean-Eudes Gannat, head of L'Alvarium, Raphaël Ayma, former parliamentary aide to a National Rally MP, Axel Loustau, and the Novelum Carcassonne group. Thirteen people were arrested, including counter-demonstrators.

== Influx ==
According to Libération, the gatherings fell into decline during the 2000s.

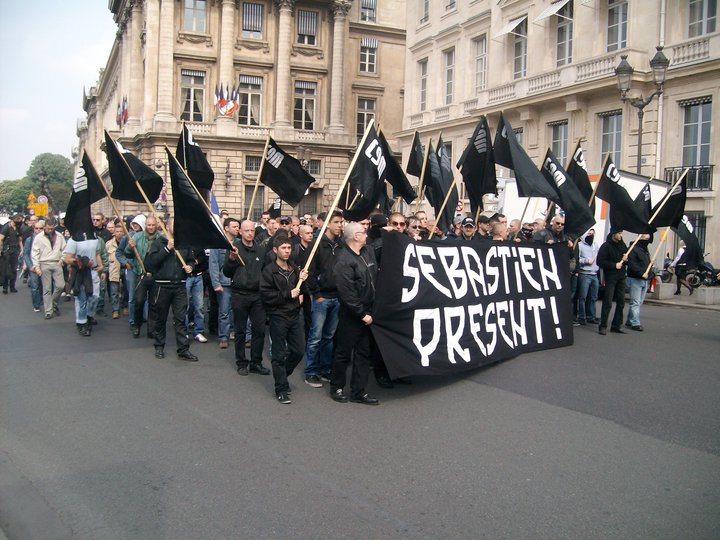
The C9M march in 2010

In 2010, the commemoration took place on the same day as Joan of Arc Day. Up to 700 people marched from Place de la Madeleine to the Joan of Arc statue on Place des Pyramides.

In 2017, the march gathered only 80 people. According to Libération, the takeover of the C9M by ZVP and the Social Bastion saw these rallies regain momentum. In 2018, the number of participants to the C9M march increased dramatically, with over 170 people making it to the parade. In 2019, around 300 people took part in the commemorative march.

In 2020, due to the COVID-19 pandemic, only a dozen activists attended the commemoration. In 2022, almost 300 people demonstrated. In 2023, the event attracted 550 participants, according to the prefecture. In 2024, more than 600 far-right activists, and up to 850 according to BFM TV, took to the streets. In 2025, a thousand people marched.

== Bans ==
In 2008, the Paris police prefect, Michel Gaudin, banned the parade because of the "unprecedented risk of confrontation" between far-right and far-left demonstrators.

In 2023, the demonstration caused a scandal, especially on the left, against a backdrop of numerous union demonstrations banned in opposition to pension reform. Prefect Laurent Nuñez responded to the controversy by stating that he had not had sufficient legal grounds to ban the demonstration. The following day, the French executive reversed course, and Interior Minister Gérald Darmanin asked the prefect to issue prohibition orders against requests for demonstrations from the far-right. In 2024, the Paris prefecture of police banned the rally, fearing public order disturbances and nationalist statements. The demonstration was finally authorized by the administrative court, with the prefectoral order suspended on the grounds that it violated the freedom to protest.

In 2025, initially banned by the Paris Police Prefecture, the Paris Administrative Court finally authorized the demonstration.

== Counter-protests ==
Since 2003, antifascist activists from the Réseau No Pasarán, Section carrément anti-Le Pen (SCALP), the Confédération nationale du travail (CNT), the Anarchist Federation, SUD Étudiant and Alternative libertaire have been mobilizing in response to these demonstrations. In 2005, SCALP and the CNT organized a counter-demonstration. In 2007, 200 anti-fascist demonstrators who gathered to counter-demonstrate were preventively arrested. In 2025, an "anti-fascist and anti-racist" counter-protest planned for the same location was banned, while the C9M rally was finally authorized. Several counter-demonstrators were arrested.

== Attacks on press freedom ==
In 2023, activists providing security for the demonstration refused to allow journalists to take photos of the rally, even though it was public. According to Mediapart, the demonstration "took place in a climate of great hostility towards the press, and was surrounded by a police force that was too small for its dangerous nature".

In 2024, journalists have been prevented from taking photos or videos by the C9M security service.
