= All Reds Rugby Roma =

Italian rugby union team

Italy
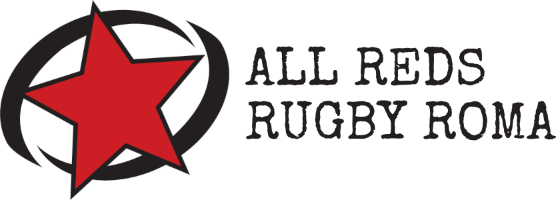
- Full name: All Reds Rugby Roma
- Union: Federazione Italiana Rugby
- Nickname: All Reds
- Founded: 2004
- Location: Rome, Lazio, Italy
- Region: Ponte Marconi
- Ground: Acrobax
- League(s): Serie C (men's), Serie A (women's)
Team kit

Official website
- allreds.it

All Reds Rugby Roma (also written All Reds Rugby or simply the All Reds) is an Italian rugby union club based in Rome. The club was founded in 2004 within the self-managed social center known as the L.O.A. Acrobax, on the site of a former greyhound racing track (cinodromo) near Ponte Marconi in the Marconi district of the city. The club, a self-organised and self-managed amateur outfit without sponsors or institutional funding, exists as part of a wider social experience in which sport serves as an exercise in values and utopian ideals. The team name is a reference, in part, to the All Blacks, as well as the left-wing political outlook of its founders.

== History ==
The club was established by members of the Laboratorio Occupato Autogestito (L.O.A.) Acrobax, a Self-managed social center, who worked to convert the derelict greyhound track into a pitch that met federation regulations. Members of the collective worked for a prolonged period to reclaim a properly regulated pitch from the site's decay, and the first home match, played in front of around 500 spectators on a pitch reseeded by their own hands, ended in defeat to Fabreternum Ceccano by 15 points to 22. The pitch was dedicated to two men commemorated by the club: Antonio Piccinino, who died in a workplace accident, and Renato Biagetti, a young left-wing Roman killed in an attack in Focene.

By the club's own account, the project grew out of a wish to challenge the perception of rugby union as an inherently macho or right-leaning pursuit, and to root the sport instead in anti-fascism, anti-racism and opposition to sexism. A minirugby programme for children was introduced some years later, beginning with a project run in the "G. Vaccari" primary school in Rome, before continuing as a regular weekend session on the club's own pitch.

By the mid-2020s, the club fielded a youth section of around 120 children, a women's senior side of 15 players and a men's senior side of 35 players.

== Organisation and philosophy ==
All Reds Rugby Roma is run on a self-organised, non-hierarchical basis. The project has never accepted sponsors and charges no membership fees for its senior players or for the parents of children in the youth section, known as the Small Reds. Coaches are typically drawn from former players and from parents of children attending the club, who complete the basic coaching course of the Federazione Italiana Rugby before taking up training duties.

The role of club "president" is understood as a delegated and revocable function rather than a position of authority, and the team's on-field captaincy has historically rotated from match to match. The club has described itself as a laboratory rather than a closed political space, bringing together people who share broad projects and concrete goals rather than being made up solely of political militants.

The club emphasises equal access to sport regardless of income. Its members view free sport as a right on a par with education and healthcare, rather than as a form of volunteering, and one that should be accessible to everyone.

=== Women's rugby ===
The club has actively promoted women's participation in the sport, aiming to challenge the perception of rugby union and other contact sports as exclusively male pursuits. Women coaching within the club have noted the difficulties typically faced by female coaches in Italian rugby more broadly, contrasting this with what they describe as a genuinely practised opposition to sexism within All Reds.

== Competitive record ==
The men's senior team has competed in Serie C, while the women's senior team has played in Serie A for a number of years. In one earlier season, the men's team finished third in the more competitive of the two Serie C groups. The club has also entered the women's Coppa Italia sevens competition. In a more recent season, the men's team reached the final of an interregional tournament, defeating locally established sides including Primavera, Segni and LUISS.

== Ground ==
The club's home ground sits within the Acrobax social centre complex, alongside a brewery, a wood-fired pizza kitchen, a gym, an after-school study space, a recording studio and meeting rooms. The site has faced repeated threats of eviction over the years.

== International and community ties ==
The club has maintained a longstanding connection with Cuba, dating to a 2007 trip during which the team played a match against Cuban university students. The club has also organised fundraising events in support of sending medical supplies to Cuba. The club also attempted to introduce rugby to Cuba through a dedicated training programme on the island.

The club's activities and its association with the Acrobax social centre were the subject of the documentary Uso improprio, directed by Luca Gasparini and Alberto Masi, which was presented at the Turin Film Festival.

== Controversies ==
The club's public association with anti-fascism has, on occasion, led to friction with groups on the political right.

In 2010, the local branch of the National Association of Italian Partisans (ANPI), named after Renato Biagetti and linked to the club, invited fellow ANPI branches to attend a match between All Reds and a newly formed side called Vantaggio, warning that the opposing team included members of the Roman far right. The invitation prompted criticism from the Far-right social centres CasaPound and Foro 753, who accused the organisers of bringing political violence into sport. A club player who also served as branch secretary responded that the invitation had contained no call to intolerance or violence.

In March 2014, a Serie C fixture between All Reds and Corsari Rugby Roma was abandoned after a Corsari player said he had been prevented from entering the ground and told the venue was an anti-fascist space, reportedly because of his association with the far-right social centre Foro 753. All Reds subsequently stated on their website that individuals outside the ground had stopped the player approaching, and that the club had chosen to withdraw from the match and concede victory to the Corsari once it became aware of the situation, pending a ruling from the regional sporting committee.

== See also ==
- Rugby union in Italy
- Anti-fascism
- Self-managed social centres in Italy
