= French nationalism =

Political Ideology

Flag of France

The Arc de Triomphe in Paris

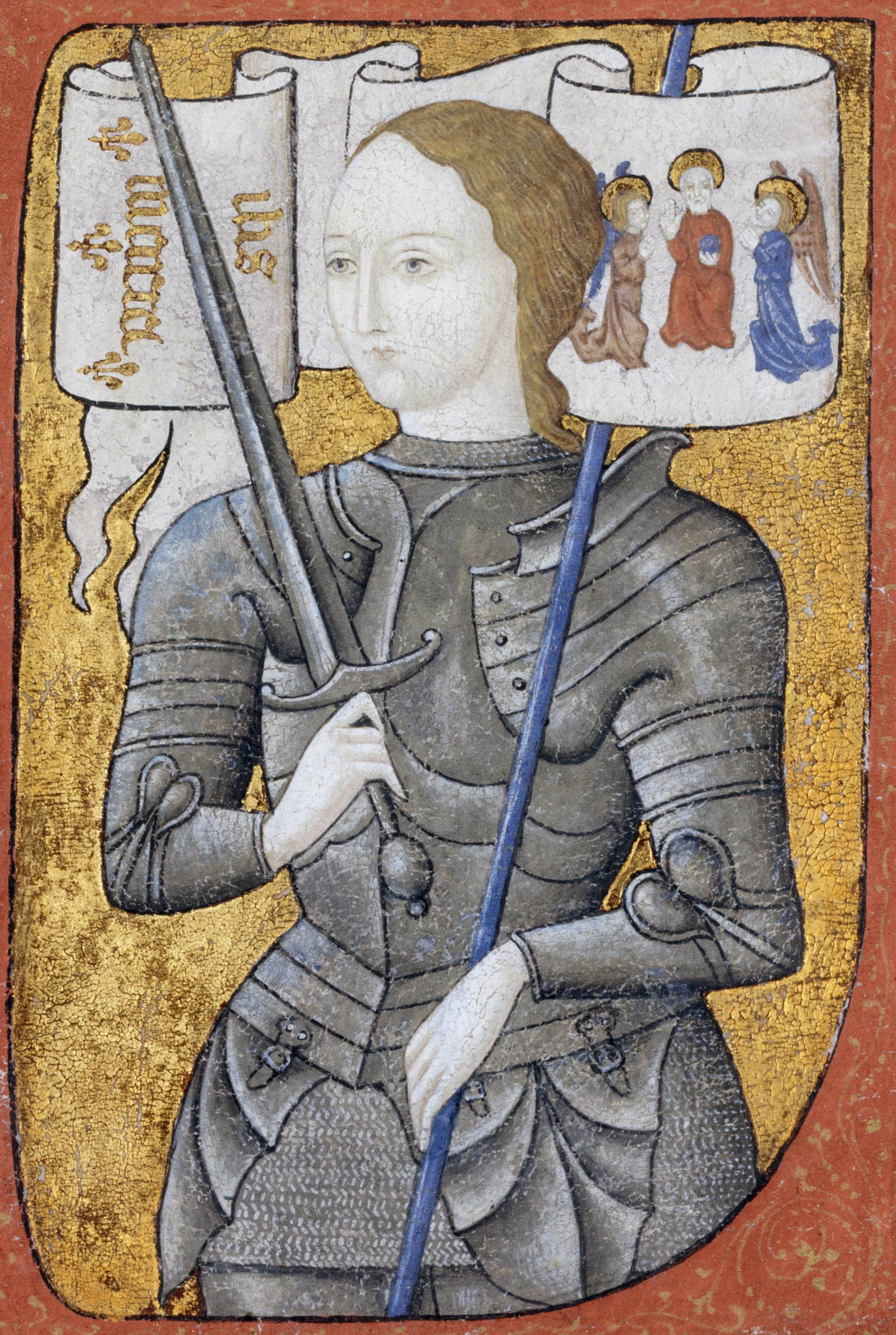
Joan of Arc, a national hero of France

French nationalism (French: Nationalisme français) usually manifests as civic and cultural nationalism, promoting the cultural unity of France.

== History ==
French nationalism emerged during the Hundred Years' War, which consisted of a series of intermittent conflicts with the Kingdom of England. The wars produced a great icon of French nationalism, Joan of Arc. The Catholic Church also played a major role after the Protestant Reformation. French nationalism became a powerful movement after the French Revolution in 1789. Napoleon Bonaparte promoted French nationalism based upon the ideals of the French Revolution such as the idea of liberty, equality, fraternity and justified French expansionism and French military campaigns on the claim that France had the right to spread the enlightened ideals of the French Revolution across Europe, and also to expand France into its so-called "natural borders." Napoleon's invasions of other nations spread the concept of nationalism outside of France.

=== 1814-1914 ===
After Napoleon's defeat and downfall, French nationalism from the 19th to early 20th century took on an assertive and extreme patriotism that supported military force to achieve its political goals. During World War I, France pursued irredentist claims on the region of Alsace-Lorraine that had been lost to Germany at the end of the Franco-Prussian War of 1870–1871. French national pride was damaged in World War I by the long, drawn-out war with Germany fought on its soil; especially in World War II when the French government surrendered to Germany in 1940; and after France lost many of its colonies due to decolonization after World War II.

The symbols of nationalism included not only Joan of Arc but also Roland, the hero of The Song of Roland (La chanson de Roland). He died in combat against the Unfaithful while defending Charlemagne and his men, making him a suitable patriotic symbol for the modern age.

The politics of left and right played a role as conservatives seized on nationalism to attack the left. Conservative French nationalists successfully labeled antimilitarism as antinationalist in the 1898-1914 era. Many of the more vocal antimilitarists were activist anarchists and radical Marxist organizations. Historians have interpreted this attack by arguing French nationalism was rejecting its roots in the French Revolution and was becoming something of an extremist, protofascist movement. However, most antimilitarists did not reject their nation but instead claimed to be protecting the Republic which they saw as synonymous with the nation. They saw the conservatives as a danger to a republican France.

The large conservative Catholic element, frustrated by the failure to restore the monarchy, turned to a new variation on nationalism. Led by the daily newspaper La Croix, founded by the Assumptionist priests in 1883, it denounced the Republic's anti-clericalism and encouraged Boulangism and Germanophobia. It promoted French imperialism as the fulfillment of a mission to bring civilization and Christianity to the pagans ("mission civilisatrice") and it boasted of France's cultural superiority over everyone else.

The Dreyfus affair of the 1890s saw conservatives use nationalism to attack the Third Republic. However, when the republicans passed laws hostile to the Catholic Church in 1901-1905, such as disbanding the Assumptionists, many conservatives switched their energies and funding away from nationalistic projects to a defense of the Church instead. Devout Catholic women were especially active in this switch. Historian Robert Fuller argues it effectively ended the nationalist challenge to the Third Republic.

=== Since 1914 ===
The disaster of the Nazi Occupation of France led to a collapse of confidence in Republican governance. Maréchal Philippe Pétain, a hero of the world war, was called upon to save France again in the name of French nationalism. He responded by stressing "the need to stay in France, to prepare a national revival, and to share the sufferings of our people. It is impossible for the government to abandon French soil without emigrating, without deserting. The duty of the government is, come what may, to remain in the country, or it could not longer be regarded as the government". Robert Bruce wrote: "He longed to take an active part in remaking France in his image and ridding the nation of the past twenty years of socialist and Marxist teachings and programs whose bitter fruit had been the defeat of 1940. France would be strong again. France would be great again, and it was his duty to make that come to pass."

Pétain's great enemy was the leader of Free France, Charles de Gaulle. He became President of France and sought to resurrect national pride. De Gaulle sought to make France the leader of an independent Europe - free from American and Soviet influence. De Gaulle's government sought Franco-German reconciliation and took a leading role in the founding of the European Coal and Steel Community that sought to resolve economic tensions between France and Germany, that French foreign minister Robert Schuman declared was designed "to end Franco-German hostility once and for all".

Into the 21st century, one controversy has been the legal treatment of veiled Muslim women and prostitutes. The government has targeted what some perceive as the 'under-covered' bodies of prostitutes and the 'over-covered' bodies of veiled Muslim women in order to exclude them from the public space. After the multiple Islamic terrorist attacks of 2015 and 2016, French nationalists had a new reason to promote anti-immigration laws. The emerging forms of French nationalism emphasize the promotion of sexual liberalism as a core value of citizenship. Julie Billaud and Julie Castro argue that the goals are to enforce a virile nationalism, prescribe new sexual norms, and criminalize immigrants and those living at the social margins.

== Parties and organizations ==
=== Current ===
- National Rally (1972–present)
- French Nationalist Party (1983–present)
- Popular Republican Union (2007–present)
- Debout la France (2008–present)
- League of the South (2010–present)
- The Patriots (2017–present)
- French Dissidence (2018–present)
- Reconquête (2021–present)

=== Defunct ===
- Croix-de-Feu (1927–1936)
- Mouvement Franciste (1933–1944)
- French National-Collectivist Party (1934–1944)
- French Popular Party (1936–1945)
- National Popular Rally (1941–1945)
- Groupe Union Défense (1968–2017)
- French and European Nationalist Party (1987–1999)
- Social Bastion (2017–2019)

== Personalities ==
- Édouard Drumont
- Joseph Darnand
- Jean-Marie Le Pen
- Marcel Bucard
- Charles de Gaulle
- Philippe Leclerc de Hauteclocque
- Marc Augier
- François Brigneau
- Alain Soral
- Jacques Ploncard d'Assac
- François Duprat
- Éric Zemmour
- Dominique Venner
- Jérôme Bourbon
- Yvan Benedetti
- Hervé Ryssen
- Alexandre Gabriac
- Daniel Conversano

== See also ==
- Gaullism
- Natural borders of France
- What Is a Nation?
- Ernest Renan
- Racism in France
- Souverainism

== Bibliography ==
- Bell, David A. "Lingua Populi, Lingua Dei: Language, Religion, and the Origins of French Revolutionary Nationalism." American Historical Review 100#5 (1995), pp. 1403–1437. in JSTOR.
- Bell, David A. The Cult of the Nation in France: Inventing Nationalism, 1680-1800 (2001) emphasizes religion and the wars with England.
- Ben-Amos, Avner. "Monuments and Memory in French Nationalism." History and Memory 5#2 (1993), pp. 50–81. in JSTOR
- Billaud, Julie and Castro, Julie. "Whores and Niqabées: The Sexual Boundaries of French Nationalism." French Politics, Culture & Society (2013) 31#2 pp 81–101
- Hyslop, Beatrice Fry. French Nationalism in 1789 According to the General Cahiers (1934)
- Motyl, Alexander J. (2001). Encyclopedia of Nationalism, Volume II. Academic Press. ISBN 0-12-227230-7.
- Sternhell, Zeev. "Paul Deroulede and the Origins of Modern French Nationalism." Journal of Contemporary History 6#4 (1971), pp. 46–70. in JSTOR.
- Vincent, K. Steven. "National Consciousness, Nationalism and Exclusion: Reflections on the French Case." Historical Reflections / Réflexions Historiques 19#3 (1993), pp. 433–449. in JSTOR
