= Florence shooting =

Florence shooting may refer to:

- 2011 Florence shootings, in Italy
- Murder of Idy Diene, in Florence, Italy
- Florence, South Carolina shooting, in 2018 in the United States
- 2024 Florence shooting, in Kentucky, United States
