= Francophone nationalism =

Francophone nationalism refers to nationalism of Francophone peoples and societies involving a theme of the French language as a component of it.

== Examples ==
- Acadian nationalism
- French nationalism
- Métis nationalism
- Quebec nationalism
