= L'Œuvre Française =

French nationalist movement

- Présideur: Pierre Sidos (1968–2012); Yvan Benedetti (2012–2013)
- Founded: 1968; 58 years ago
- Dissolved: July 23, 2013
- Succeeded by: The Nationalists
- Newspaper: Le Soleil (1968–1993); Jeune Nation (1994–2013)
- Youth wing: Jeunesses Nationalistes
- Membership (2013): 400
- Ideology: French nationalism Neo-Pétainism; Antisemitism
- Political position: Far-right
- Colours: Blue; White; Red

L'Œuvre Française (French: [lœvʁə fʁɑ̃sɛːz], OF; English: "The French Work"), also called L'Œuvre (pronounced [lœvʁ]), was a French nationalist, néo-Pétainist and antisemitic movement founded in 1968 by Pierre Sidos. Inspired by the "semi-fascist" regimes of Vichy France, Francoist Spain and the Estado Novo, L'Œuvre Française was—until its dissolution by the authorities in 2013—the oldest nationalist association still active in France.

== History ==
=== Background: 1949–1967 ===
The founder of L'Œuvre Française, Pierre Sidos, had been a member of the fascist Parti Franciste during WWII. He later established and led the neo-fascist group Jeune Nation (1949–58), then founded Occident in 1964 after the dissolution of the former movement. Following his departure from the Occident in 1965-66, Sidos began to focus on the creation of another far-right movement.

In February 1966, Sidos created with André Cantelaube the magazine Le Soleil ("The Sun"), which would become the official organ of L'Œuvre Française. The periodical was fervently anti-Semite, even described as such by the organ of the Front National's youth movement in 1975. Le Soleil indeed defended an anti-capitalist nationalism that denounced the role of Jews in finance, politics, and the industries, as well as the "threat" represented by the state of Israel on geopolitics.

=== Creation and emergence: 1968–1982 ===
L'Œuvre Française was founded by Pierre Sidos in April 1968, who declared himself "presidor for life" (French: présideur, a portmanteau of président and dictateur). The group held their first congress two years later on 10 October 1970 in Versailles.

On this platform, Sidos attempted to run in the 1969 French presidential election, but his candidacy was rejected by the Constitutional Council on a technical basis. It has been argued that there was a fear that any judgement in Sidos' favor would have been considered a vindication of his collaborationist background in wider society. Le Soleil, on its side, dismissed the Jewish origin of some members in the council, namely Gaston Palewski and René Cassin, as the reason for their refusal. In 1973, Sidos ran again as the only L'Œuvre candidate in the legislative election.

In 1982, L'Œuvre participated in the Regroupement Nationaliste ("Nationalist Union"), along with Jean-Gilles Malliarakis' Troisième Voie and the magazine-movement Militant. The Regroupement made little headway and soon fell apart. Following an increase in far-right violence at the end of the previous decade, the police considered a first time the possibility of banning the group in 1980, highlighting their own designation as a "nationalist guard", their organized physical trainings in the woods and obsessional antisemitism as potential risks. They eventually asked the authorities to keep L'Œuvre under surveillance.

=== Entryst strategy: 1983–2012 ===
After the failure of the Regroupement project, L'Œuvre kept on acting mostly alone among the far-right nebula, and preferred instead developing its own strategy of entryism. They infiltrated and recruited in the police, especially though the workers' union FPIP, in which they claimed half the members were L'Œuvre adherents in the 1990s. In 1993, three militants of L'Œuvre were arrested while planning an attack on Patrick Gaubert, then special adviser in the French government with responsibility for combating racism and xenophobia.

Le Soleil was banned from publicity and sales to minors in 1990 following the Gayssot Act, which outlawed Holocaust denial. The movement launched in early 1994 a new organ named Jeune Nation, in reference to an older group Sidos had founded nearly forty-five years earlier and dissolved by decree in 1958.

Sidos tried in this period to build a rapprochement with the Front National (FN). In 1996, he announced the rallying of L'Œuvre to the party, despite the opposition of his right-hand-man Yvan Benedetti. After negotiations with Sidos, Jean-Marie Le Pen allowed some L'Œuvre militants, notably Benedetti and Alexandre Gabriac, to become part of the FN in 2007. The party however later tightened its policy regarding relations with radical groups, Marine Le Pen denouncing an "operation of entryism" to facilitate the seizure of power by her rival Bruno Gollnisch in the FN.

Gabriac was eventually expelled from the FN in 2011 after a photo that showed him doing a Nazi salute re-emerged. His expulsion was followed the same year by that of Benedetti, who had defined himself as an "anti-Zionist, anti-Semite, anti-Jews" in an interview. Gabriac and Benedetti thus decided to establish "Jeunesses Nationalistes" in 2011 as the youth movement and activist branch of L'Œuvre, in order to attract militants disappointed with the new FN leadership. The following year, Pierre Sidos, then 85, left the presidency after 44 years in office, and was succeeded by Benedetti. On 25 May 2013, the women's branch, named Les Caryatides, was launched and headed by Marie-Claire Gandillon.

=== Dissolution and legacy: 2013–present ===
L'Œuvre Française was dissolved on 10 July 2013 after the issue of an official decree by the then Minister of the Interior, Manuel Valls. The ban occurred in a context of street violence by far-right revolutionary groups, which culminated in the death of a far-left activist in a fight against another nationalist association led by Serge Ayoub. Valls justified the dissolution by denouncing L'Œuvre as a group "organized like a private militia thanks to paramilitary-like training camps." He further added that the association had been "spreading a xenophobic and antisemitic ideology, diffusing racist and Holocaust-denying thesis, exalting collaboration [with the Nazis] and the Vichy regime, paying regular tribute to Pétain, Brasillach or Maurras".

In 2014, Benedetti and Gabriac ran in the municipal elections of Vénissieux, in the outskirts of Lyon, inviting electors to "slip a quenelle" inside the ballot box. With 11.5% of the votes, they obtained sieges in the city council. The ballot initiated by the two FN dissidents was called "Vénissieux Fait Front" and featured most of the candidates that had run for the FN during the previous election, which led Marine Le Pen to denounce Benedetti and Gabriac as "parasites" and to call for the invalidation of their candidacy. The vote was eventually declared void a few months later by the Conseil d'État due to irregularities in the list of candidates.

Following the dissolution of L'Œuvre in 2013, the website of the organ Jeune Nation was re-activated by Yvan Benedetti and Alexandre Gabriac, with the copyright "1958–2013 Jeune Nation". In September 2015, Benedetti appealed to join the French Nationalist Party, a radical group initially established in 1983 and re-activated earlier that year to cope with the dissolution of several far-right groups. In June 2019, Yvan Benedetti was sentenced to a suspended 8 months jail sentence for "recreating a disbanded league", L'Œuvre having kept on operating for several months following the dissolution.

== Ideology ==
Closer to the "semi-fascist" Francoist Spain and Estado Novo than true fascist regimes, L'Œuvre Française was nonetheless an antisemitic, racialist and neo-Pétainist organization, influenced by various conspiracy theories. In the words of historian Nicolas Lebourg, L'Œuvre was "more inclined to the authoritarianism of Franco, Pétain or Salazar than to fascism (...) it focuses above all on an anti-Semitism that is at once conspiratorial, racial and anti-Zionist. It is a neo-Petainism in its essence, but in its form, the grouping wants to be a phalanx with Leninist discipline."

The movement aimed at dissolving democracy and opposing mass immigration through the "deliverance of France and the French from an ideological and economic cosmopolitanism." Its motto was La France aux Français ("France to the French").

=== Agenda ===
Sidos listed Maurice Bardèche, Charles Maurras, Maurice Barrès, and Édouard Drumont as the group's intellectual mentors. During its two first congresses in 1970 and 1975, L'Œuvre defined their political agenda as the establishment of a "nationalist state" founded on the idea of "blood and soil" and a Catholic doctrine purged from Jewish influence. The French head of state would be designated by an elite electoral college similar to the Papal conclave. Display of political affiliation or atheism in public life were to be banned, while a "corporatist socialism" was to achieve a "popular and communitarian state, with the union under the same fasces of all nation activities and forces". In its monthly organ Jeune Nation, L'Œuvre dismissed democracy as the "reign of drugs", "suicide" and "meaningless words like tolerance, human rights, anti-racism, liberty, that emasculate our youth."

=== Structure ===
Designed as a cult of personality, the organization was labeled a sect or nicknamed the "Church of Sidology" by competing far right groups, while its adherents highlighted the discipline and determination allowed by their organizational structure. Sidos was recognized by L'Œuvre adherents as the "future guide for the people and the nation." Far from being a mass party, the organization had 20 members at its creation, around 50 a decade later, and around 400 at the time of its dissolution in 2013. Political scientist Jean-Yves Camus explains the large media coverage compared to the size of the group by an "excellent communication from the leadership".

=== Symbols ===
The emblem of L'Œuvre Française was a Celtic Cross painted with the French tricolor. The anthem, whose lyrics were written in 1974 by Sidos, was titled "Nous voulons rester Français" ("We want to remain French").
