= Jack Marchal =

French musician, illustrator, and far-right activist (1946–2022)

- Born: 19 September 1946
- Died: 1 September 2022 (aged 75)
- Occupations: Musician; Illustrator; Activist

Jack Marchal (19 September 1946 – 1 September 2022) was a French musician, illustrator, and activist of the far-right.

== Biography ==
Marchal joined the political movement Occident in 1966 and was a founding member of the Groupe Union Défense in 1968. He was also a part of the political and press offices of the Ordre Nouveau. At the same time, he was a member of the Association pour la liberté économique et le progrès social and helped start the National Front in 1972 before joining the Party of New Forces two years later. He would rejoin the National Front in 1984.

Marchal was known for writing the characters "rat noir", inspired by illustrations from Raymond Macherot. These characters appeared in the soap opera "Les Rats maudits", published in the satirical newspaper Alternative.

In the late 1990s, Marchal wrote rock identitaire français music and served as the guitarist for the group Elendil.

Marchal died on 1 September 2022, at the age of 75.

== Publications ==
- Histoire de la civilisation racontée aux enfants (1975)
- Les Rats maudits : histoire des étudiants nationalistes, 1965-1995 (1995)

== Discography ==
- Science and Violence (1979)
