= The Nationalists (France) =

French nationalist political party

The Nationalists Les Nationalistes
- Chef: Yvan Benedetti
- Founder: Pierre Bousquet; Jean Castrillo; Henri Simon
- Founded: 1983; 43 years ago 2015; 11 years ago (reactivated)
- Split from: National Front
- Newspaper: Militant
- Ideology: French nationalism Ultranationalism; Neo-Nazism; Antisemitism; Neo-Pétainism; Neo-fascism; Identitarianism; Anti-immigration
- Political position: Far-right
- Religion: Catholicism
- International affiliation: Alliance for Peace and Freedom (associate); International Sovereigntist League (since 2025)
- Colours: Blue and Gold

Party flag

Website
- https://www.les-nationalistes.com/

PNF members alongside members of the nationalist CLAN movement participating in a 2015 rally honoring Jeanne d'Arc

The Nationalists (French: Les Nationalistes), also known as Parti Nationaliste Français, is a far-right neo-fascist political movement in France originally established in 1983 by former National Front (FN) members, including former Waffen-SS members like Pierre Bousquet, Jean Castrillo, and Henri Simon, around the magazine Militant. Inactive after the early 1990s, it was reactivated in 2015 following the dissolution of the néo-Pétainist movement L'Œuvre Française by the French authorities in 2013. Far-right militant Yvan Benedetti serves as its current leader.

== History ==
The organization was originally established in December 1983 as Parti Nationaliste Français (PNF) by Pierre Bousquet, Jean Castrillo, Henri Simon (the three of them were former Waffen-SS Charlemagne members), Pierre Pauty, André Delaporte, Patrice Chabaille, Alain Renault. All of them, except Simon, were former National Front (FN) members who had split off from the party in 1980 after dismissing it as becoming "too conservative" and "too Zionist" following the death of François Duprat in 1978. FN leader Jean-Marie Le Pen himself was seen a puppet of the Jews, and rising FN member Jean-Pierre Stirbois accused of secretly being a Jew. Alain de La Tocnaye, who had been involved in the Petit-Clamart terrorist attack against then French President Charles de Gaulle, was also a founding member of the party.

Pauty was the leader and first president of the Parti Nationaliste Français (PNF). Their aim was to "organize French nationalists and legally diffuse their doctrine", but the racist ideology of a "white Europe from Brest to Vladivostok" failed to convince the public.

Two years after the foundation of the Nationalist Party in June 1985, a group of radicals split off the PNF to create the French and European Nationalist Party (PNFE), whose members were involved in several terrorists attacks in the late 1980s, and which replaced the PNF as the main neo-Nazi group in France until its own dissolution in 1999.

From the early 1990s, the PNF was weakened by the departure of its leader Pierre Pauty, who joined the FN in 1992, and by the death of Pierre Bousquet in 1991. In June 1995, Pauty obtained 26.2% of the votes in the municipal election of Saint-Denis, Seine-Saint-Denis. Meanwhile, the organization became inactive, with only its magazine Militant surviving. The party had no more than 100 militants during this period.

After the dissolution of L'Œuvre Française in 2013, its president Yvan Benedetti, along with André Gandillon, the redactor-in-chief of Militant, reactivated the French Nationalist Party as a new outset for the banned association. In September 2015, Benedetti became its spokesman and called on all L'Œuvre members to join the PNF.

In 2022, party spokesman Yvan Benedetti tried with no success to run as candidate for the 2022 French presidential election.

== Organisation ==
As of 2016, the party was headed by a 15-member presidium, which included Jean-François Simon (president), André Gandillon (secretary general), Éric Leroy (treasurer), and Yvan Benedetti (spokesman).

Castrillo was a member of the presidium from 1983 until his death in 2012.

== Elections ==
=== European Parliament ===
Election	Leader	Votes	%	Seats	+/−	EP Group
2024	Pierre-Marie Bonneau	5,904	0.02 (#25)	0 / 81	New	−
