= 2011 Florence shootings =

Hate crime in Italy

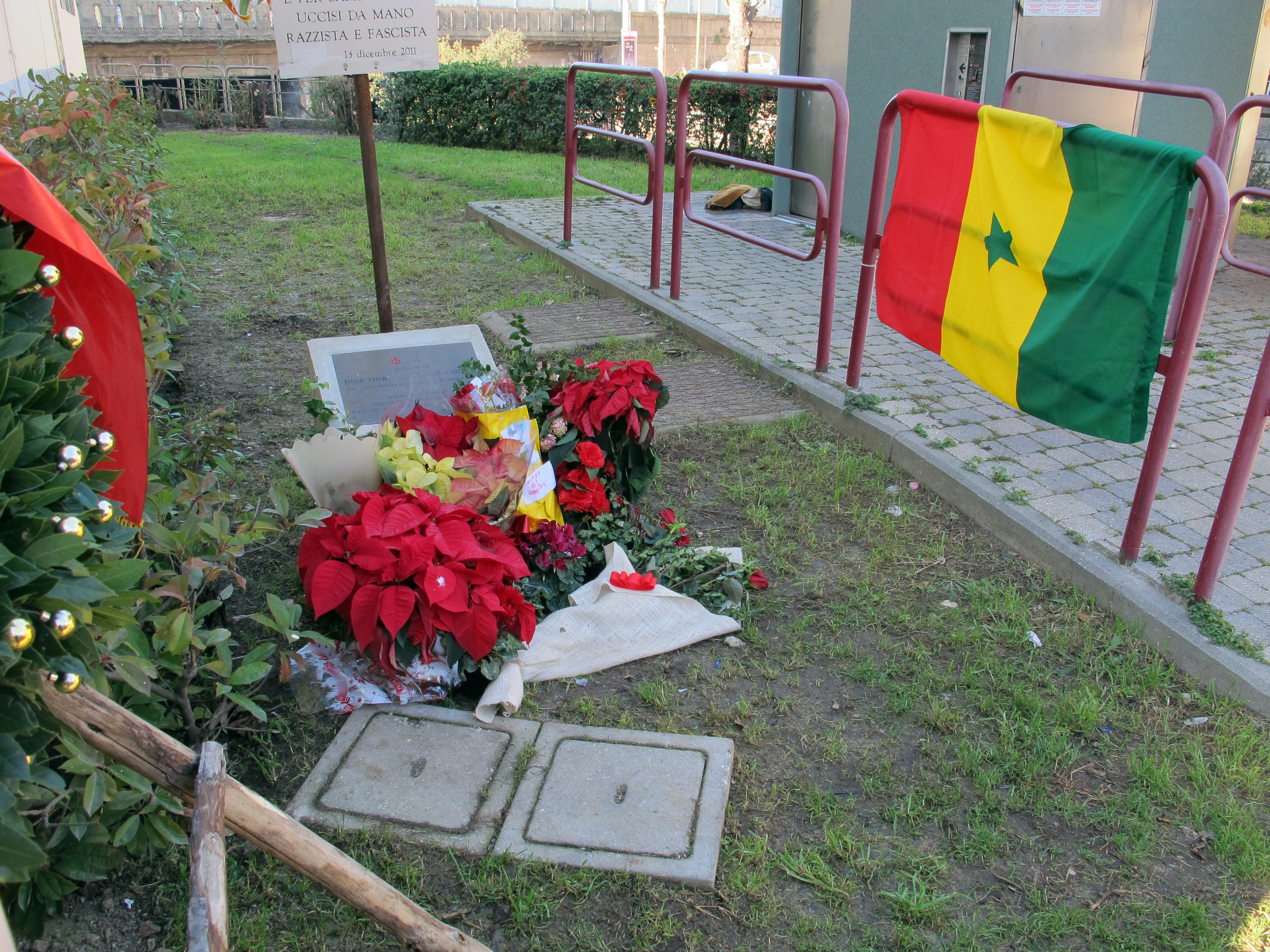
- Memorial
- Location: Florence, Tuscany, Italy
- Date: 13 December 2011; 12:34 p.m. (Central European Time)
- Target: Senegalese market traders
- Attack type: Spree shooting; mass shooting; hate crime
- Weapon: Smith & Wesson .357 Magnum
- Deaths: 3 (including the perpetrator)
- Injuries: 3
- Perpetrator: Gianluca Casseri
- Motive: Far-right extremism

On 13 December 2011, a spree shooting occurred in Florence, Italy. Two male market traders from Senegal, 40-year-old Samb Modou, and 54-year-old Diop Mor, were killed by Gianluca Casseri, who wounded three other Senegalese traders in another market. According to Florentine prosecutor Giuseppe Quattrocchi, the killer fatally shot himself as he was approached by police in a car park. The attack was racially motivated according to authorities.

The attack occurred on the same day and at the same hour as the 2011 Liège attack. There is no evidence the two shootings were coordinated.

== Timeline ==
The first shootings were at the Piazza Dalmazia market on Tuesday morning, where two market traders were shot dead and one injured. The killer then fled in a car and wounded two more vendors at the San Lorenzo later that day. He shot himself when confronted by armed police.

== Response to shootings ==
Protests took place after the shootings, with people marching to the Prefects' office, demanding justice. A leader of the protest met with the Prefect. Some Senegalese gathered in the Piazza del Duomo to pray.

CasaPound, an Italian far-right and neo-fascist group, described Casseri as a sympathiser but not a member.

== The attacker ==
The attacker was 50-year-old Gianluca Casseri, an accountant from Pistoia who had a history of involvement in far-right politics. In 2010 he published an historical novel La Chiave del Caos (lit. 'The Key of Chaos'), co-authored with Enrico Rulli. He also published a newsletter for fans of J. R. R. Tolkien.

== See also ==
- CasaPound
- Mercato Centrale (Florence)
- 2018 Florence shooting
