= Groupe Union Défense =

French far-right students' union

- Celtic cross
- Formation: 1968
- Dissolved: 26 June 2024; 2 years ago
- Type: Students' union
- Purpose: Far-right student activism
- Location: Panthéon-Assas University, France
- Secessions: Social Bastion

Groupe Union Défense (originally named Groupe Union Droit), better known as GUD, was a French far-right students' union formed in the 1960s. The GUD was based in Panthéon-Assas University, a law school in Paris. After a period of inactivity it relaunched in 2022. On 26 June 2024, the French government ordered the dissolution of the GUD.

== Ideology ==
Formed as a far-right, anti-communist youth organization, in the mid-1980s, the GUD turned toward support of the Third Position movements and "national revolutionary" theories, as well as embracing anti-Zionism, anti-Americanism and Assadism.

== Culture ==
GUD took as symbol the Celtic cross and the comic black rats (rats noirs).

Some music groups of Rock identitaire français had connections with GUD.

== History ==
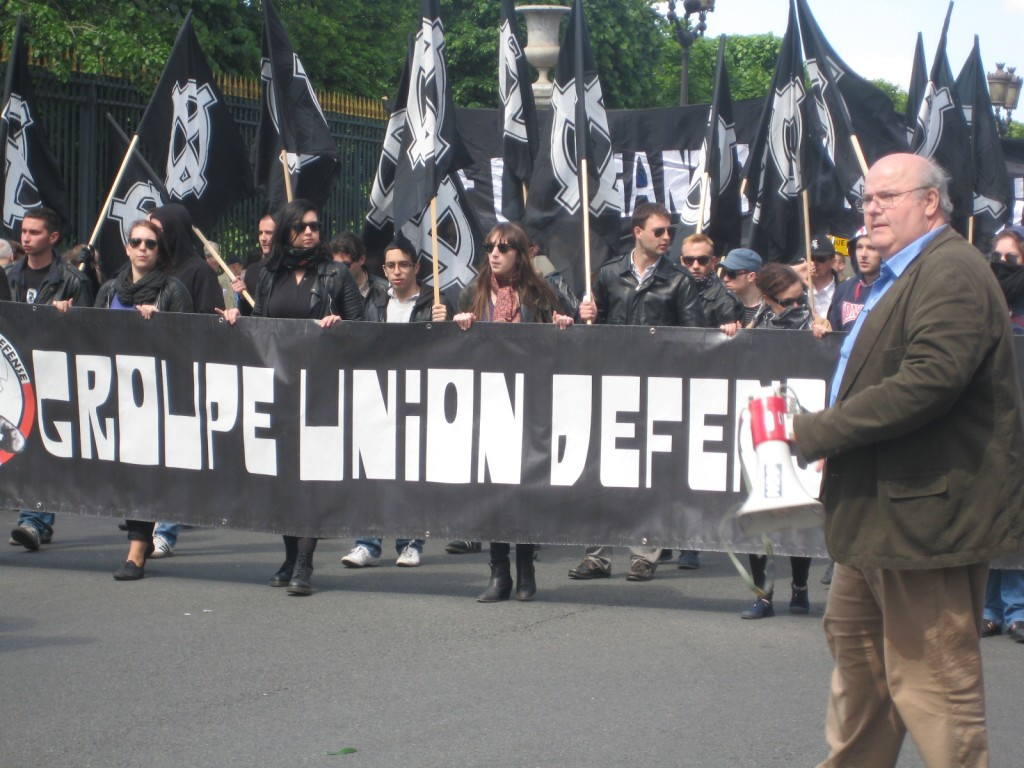
Members of the GUD during demonstration in Paris in 2012

GUD was founded in December 1968 under the name Union Droit at Panthéon-Assas University by Alain Robert (homme politique), Gérard Longuet, Gérard Ecorcheville and some members of the political movement Occident. In its early period, it was a reactionary bourgeois student movement, and some of its early members went on to become mainstream conservative politicians, including Gérard Longuet, Hervé Novelli and Alain Madelin.

Members of the GUD participated in the 1969 founding of Ordre Nouveau.

During the 1970s and early 1980s, linked to the Parti des forces nouvelles (PFN), the GUD published the satiric monthly Alternative. Members in this period included Alain Orsoni, a Corsican nationalist linked to organised crime and suspected of the murder of Marie-Jeanne Bozzi.

On 9 May 1994 GUD member Sébastien Deyzieu died after clashes between nationalists and riot police. Following these event, some French nationalist groups formed an umbrella organization Comité du 9-Mai (C9M) and holds yearly a commemorative marches in Paris on May 9.

In 1998, the Group united itself with Jeune Résistance and the Union des cercles résistance, offshoots of Nouvelle Résistance group, under the name Unité Radicale, but it was dissolved after Maxime Brunerie's failed assassination attempt on president Jacques Chirac.

In 2004, the GUD reformed under the name Rassemblement étudiant de droite. Its publication was Le Dissident.

In 2017 members of the GUD squatted a building in Lyon and founded political movement Social Bastion.

In late 2022, graffiti appeared in educational institutions in Paris (including the École Normale Supérieure) saying "GUD is back"; a video was released on Ouest Casual, a Telegram channel used by the far right, commemorating some Greek neo-Nazis; and the GUD slogan “Europe, Youth, Revolution” appeared on stickers in Paris and chants at a right-wing demonstration in Lyon. Its activists were reported to be drawn from far-right trade union La Cocarde Étudiante, the ultra-right group the Zouaves, traditionalist Catholics from Versailles, and football hooligans.

== Members ==
Successive leaders of the GUD were: Alain Robert, Jack Marchal, Jean-François Santacroce, Serge Rep, Philippe Cuignache, Charles-Henri Varaut, Frédéric Chatillon, William Bonnefoy, Benoît Fleury.

=== Military volunteers ===
Some GUD members have fought in Lebanese Civil War with the Kataeb Party in 1976, Croatian War of Independence in the 1990s and in Burma during Karen conflict. In 1985 member of the GUD Jean-Philippe Courrèges was killed in action fighting for the Karen National Liberation Army.

GUD members have had links with the Department for Protection and Security, which is the security organization of the far-right political party National Front.

Former member of the GUD Alain Orsoni was member of the FLNC.

== See also ==
- History of far-right movements in France
- Federation of Nationalist Students
- Youth Front (Italy)
- Fronte universitario d'azione nazionale

== Bibliography ==
- Frédéric Chatillon, Thomas Lagane et Jack Marchal (dir.), Les Rats maudits. Histoire des étudiants nationalistes 1965-1995, Éditions des Monts d'Arrée, 1995, ISBN 2-911387-00-7.
- Roger Griffin, Net gains and GUD reactions: patterns of prejudice in a Neo-fascist groupuscule, Patterns of Prejudice, vol. 33, n°2, 1999, p. 31-50.
- Collectif, Bêtes et méchants. – Petite histoire des jeunes fascistes français, Paris, Éditions Reflex, 2002, ISBN 2-914519-01-X.
