= Far-right social centre =

Type of public political space

A far-right social centre is a space inspired by neo-fascist and Third Position ideas, typically in the 21st century.

== Europe ==
=== Italy ===
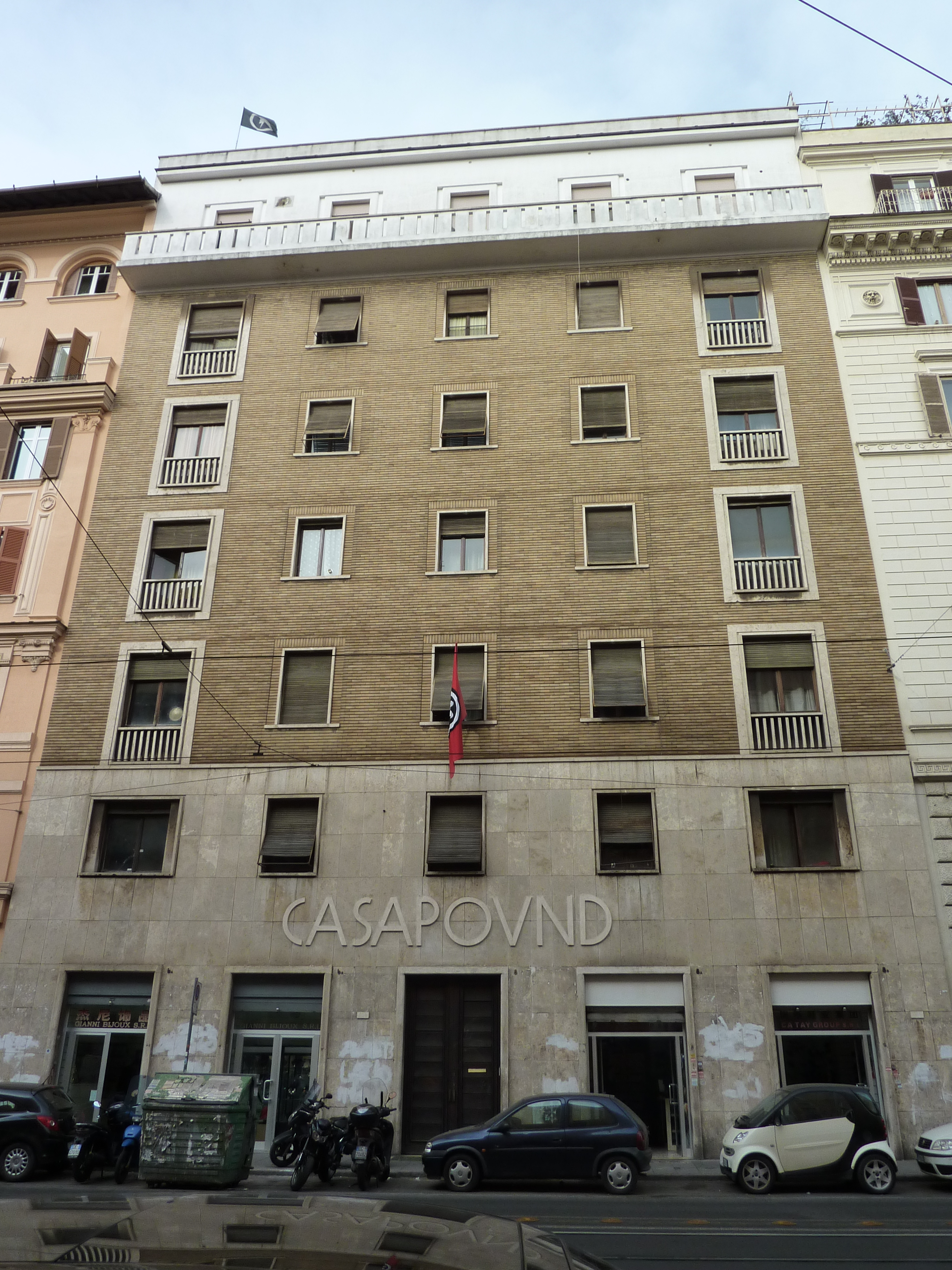
CasaPound building in Rome

In Italy, a social centre called Il Bartolo was squatted in Rome, and was burnt down after one year. In 1998, Italian neo-fascists squatted in another building in Rome at Castrense 48 and called it PortAperta. In 2002, neo-fascists squatted in a building and created social centre called CasaMontag. In 2003, Italian neo-fascists squatted in a building in Rome and created the Foro 753 non-conforming centre.

In 2003, Italian neo-fascists squatted in a building on Via Napoleone III on the Esquiline Hill and founded the CasaPound (the Ezra Pound's home) social centre. In June 2008, CasaPound constituted an "association of social promotion" and assumed the name CasaPound Italia. Other CasaPound squats are in Latina (Lazio region) (legalised) and Area 19 at via dei Monti della Farnesina 80 in Rome (evicted 2015).

In 2017, members of the far-right Forza Nuova squatted commercial premises in Rome and created a food kitchen only for Italian nationals, in breach of the Constitution of Italy.

=== France ===
Social Bastion was a French neo-fascist political movement that used squatting as a tactic before being banned as a far-right organization in 2019 by the French Government. Members of the student association GUD, squatted a building at 18 rue Port-du-Temps in Lyon, in May 2017. They planned it to help only poor French nationals. The mayor of Lyon Gérard Collomb immediately condemned the occupation and pledged to evict it. It was evicted by 100 police officers after two weeks.

In 2018, local identitarians squatted house in Angers and created social centre L’Alvarium. In 2020, the court ordered to evict it.

=== Germany ===
In 1990, in the territories of former GDR there were located some far-right social centres. One of them was Weilingstraße 122. The centre played the role as a political HQ, a living community and party space for young nationalists. In the 21st century, German nationalists, inspired by CasaPound, tried again to create their own social centres. In 2019, political party The Third Path owned the building in Plauen and created legal social centre P130.

=== Spain ===
In Spain, Hogar Social Madrid, also known as Hogar Social Ramiro Ledesma (the Ramiro Ledesma Social Home) was squatted in the Tetuán district in Madrid in August 2014. It was quickly evicted the next month and the group then occupied a building in Chamberí. Some members of the group then split off and attacked the second building, which was also evicted.

=== Ukraine ===
In Kyiv, the far-right nationalist Azov movement established the Cossack House (Ukrainian: Козацький Дім), a social centre where they host far-right events, in a building owned by the Ukrainian Ministry of Defence.

== Within squatting ==
Far-right social centres are often connected to right-wing squats or can be seen as a sub-category or a result of right-wing squatting. Squatting is the practice of occupying empty buildings. The occupied spaces are used for different purposes like communal living and organizing actions. Squatting is often practised by left-wing groups, but there are also cases of right-wing squatting. In these squats, the spaces are occupied by right-wing groups or organisations.

Right-wing squats seem to be inspired by left-wing squats in their formation, appearance and practice but differ from them in other aspects. The phenomenon of right-wing squatting is mostly prevalent in countries with big left wing squatting movements.

=== Europe ===
==== Netherlands ====
In 2000, a building in Eindhoven was squatted by neo-Nazis from the right-wing organisation Voorpost. They initiated a squatted social centre, which was used as a place for organisation of the group. In 2008, a right-wing movement squatted a building in Monster near Den Haag in the wake of protests against a squatting ban.

==== Italy ====
Italian right-wing groups have been trying to establish squatted right-wing social centres since the 1980s. Since 2003 CasaPound Italia has been upholding a right-wing squat in Rome. They want to spread their activities and squats all over Italy and name housing needs as their main reason for squatting.

==== Spain ====
In 2014, the Movement ‘Hogar Social’ initiated a squatting in Madrid. Linking social issues with xenophobic ideas they named the housing shortage for ‘native families’ as their motivation for squatting. The campaign behind this was initiated by the neo-Nazi Republican Social Movement.

==== France ====
In 2017, right-wing youth organisation 'Bastion Social' squatted in Lyon. They claimed that there would be too little housing for non-immigrants and emphasized the fear of 'colonisation' by mass-immigration.

==== Germany ====
After the Fall of the Berlin Wall, neo-Nazis became more visible again in Berlin. From December 1989 on new groups joined from the West, and in January 1990, a new neo-Nazi Party 'Nationale Alternative' (NA) was founded. In the wake of GDR collapsing there was a power vacuum and many empty buildings at that time. Because of these exceptional conditions the Berlin districts Friedrichshain and Prenzlauer Berg became places for many left-wing squats. In need of a place for organising the party-affairs, NA squatted a house in Lichtenberg, the district right next to Friedrichshain, in February 1990. Because the house they first occupied was not owned by the state they were offered alternatives. They chose Weitlingstraße 22 and founded ‘Bürgerinitiative Wohnraumsanierung e.V.’, (Citizens' Initiative for Housing Restoration, Incorporated Association) making the squatting seem like a project for common good.

The occupied building served as a headquarter, a space for communal living, planning actions, partying, propaganda production, a meeting point for (international) neo-Nazi groups, a place to stay for leading figures in neo-Nazi parties and terrorist groups. To the media it was communicated that the goal was to realise communal living and include right-wing practices in everyday life. Activities from the squatters of Weitlingstraße 22 also extended the occupied space and influenced the neighbourhood. The group committed acts of violence against asylum homes and left-wing squats in the area. There were similarities to left-wing squatting. Having bars in front of the windows, political claims on banners visible on the outside of the building, wearing military uniforms and motorcycle helmets and threatening the political opponent were common both in Weitlingstraße 22 as well as in other left-wing squats in Berlin. Another similarity was a solidarity-centred practice of shared income and expenses in the household. In other areas the squatters differed significantly from their left-wing counterparts. The clothing style was cleaner and more disciplined, the facades of the house plainer. They emphasized traditional values like order and tidiness in their communal living, which can also be interpreted as a façade of discipline presented to the outside. Hierarchies, traditional gender roles and exclusive – racist and xenophobic - forms of equality were promoted.

In April 1990, the police carried out a raid in Weitlingstraße 22 and arrested the NA leaders. The squatting declined further after an Antifa-Demo against the squat in June 1990. In July 1990 the lease agreement was terminated. Disagreements between members of NA and Gesinnungsgemeinschaft der Neuen Front (GdNF) as well as the lack of NA's success in the elections lead to the dissolution of the squatting and the house being empty at the end of 1990. Today, the conditions for right-wing squatting have changed. Police repression and the housing situation make the practice of squatting harder.

== See also ==
- Squatting
- Autonome Nationalisten
- Liberated national zones (Germany)
- Autonomous social center
- Far-right subcultures

== Bibliography ==
- Domenico Di Tullio, Centri sociali di destra. Occupazioni e culture non conformi, Roma, Castelvecchi, 2006. ISBN 88-7615-105-2.
- Daniele Di Nunzio ed Emanuele Toscano, Dentro e fuori Casapound. Capire il fascismo del Terzo Millennio, Roma, Armando Editore, 2011. ISBN 978-88-6081-926-0
- Nicola Rao, La Fiamma e la Celtica. Sessant'anni di neofascismo da Salò ai centri sociali di destra, Roma, Sperling & Kupfer, 2006. ISBN 8820041936
- Warnecke, Jakob, Failed takeover: The phenomenon of right-wing squatting. In Grashoff, Udo (eds.) Comparative Approaches to Informal Housing Around the Globe, London, UCL.Press, 2020. pp. 223–237. ISBN 88-7615-105-2
