= Mercato Centrale (Florence) =

19th-century market building in Italy

Coordinates: 43°46′36″N 11°15′12″E

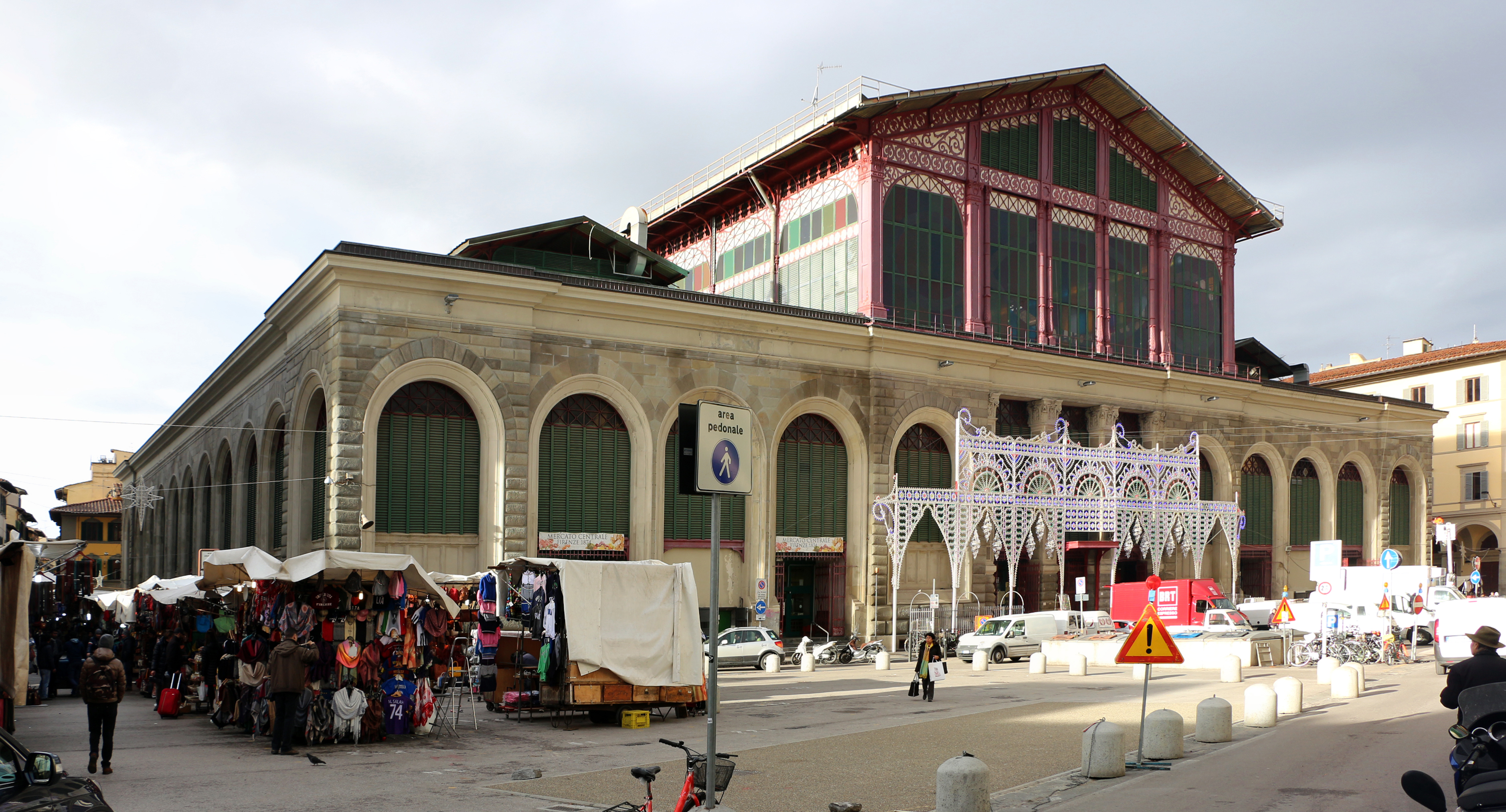
Mercato Centrale

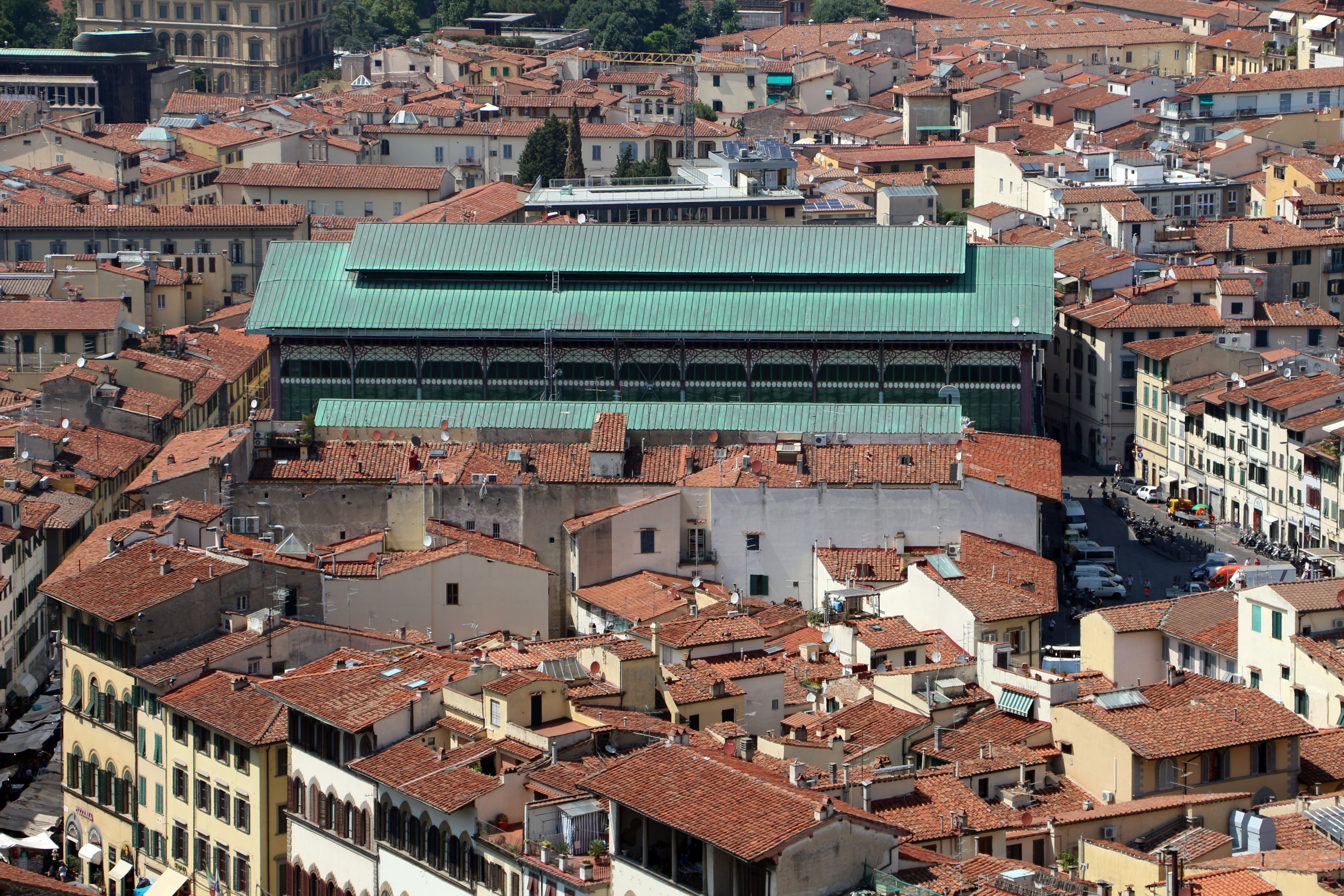
Mercato Centrale seen from the Florence Cathedral

The Mercato Centrale (Central Market in English) in Florence is located between via dell'Ariento, via Sant'Antonino, via Panicale and Piazza del Mercato Centrale. It is one of the results from the time of risanamento, the period when Florence was the capital of Italy in the late nineteenth century. It was designed by Giuseppe Mengoni, an architect who also conceived the Galleria Vittorio Emanuele II in Milan.

== Offerings ==
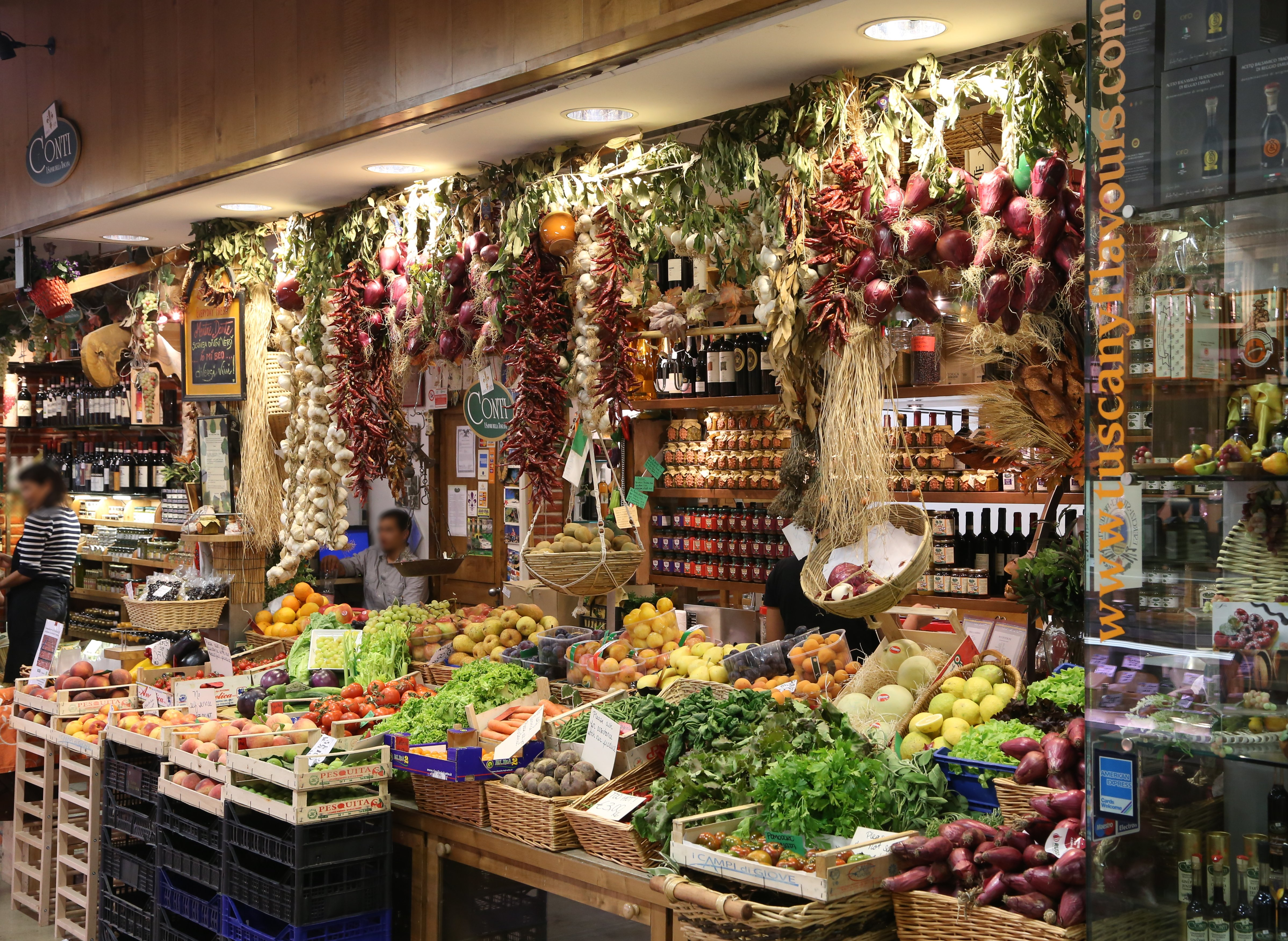
Fruit stands inside the market

Inside the market, vendors sell various primary ingredients of Tuscan cuisine. In the northern corner of the market, there is a seafood area in which vendors sell fish and shell fish that have been wild caught in Italy or imported. Fruits and vegetable stands as well as nuts and spices stands can be found outside the market. Outside the Central Market is the Mercato di San Lorenzo, which mostly sells leather goods.
