= Hervé Ryssen =

French writer

Hervé Ryssen (Real name: Hervé Lalin, born April 10, 1967) is a French writer, militant nationalist, Holocaust denier and antisemite. He is close to the circles of the far right. He considers himself racist, anti-Jewish and antisemitic, his publications and videos resulted in numerous complaints and court orders, which resulted in him being jailed for 17 months in September 2020.

== Early life ==
Ryssen was born Hervé Lalin on April 10, 1967, in Bondy, France. He obtained a master's degree in history from Paris-East Créteil University (Val-de-Marne) in 1991. His thesis focused on the Spanish Civil War. He was a history teacher for five years but he was expelled from the educational system following complaints.

Ryssen was originally an anarchist and libertarian, but over time he became more right wing and joined National Front in the 1990s. On September 16, 2002, he put a pie on the face of a priest who was helping migrants and foreigners. This action was widely covered and he became well known since the incident.

In the 2010s a campaign of antisemitic posters brought Ryssen into public view.

From 2005 to 2015 Ryssen wrote many books and articles about Judaism, eschatology and anti-white racism. In 2015 he made a documentary called Satan in Hollywood, which criticized Jewish influence and anti-catholic bias.

He took part in the yellow vest movement, and a photo of him appeared on the cover of Paris Match.

In October 2018 he paid tribute to Robert Faurisson shortly after Faurisson's death and wrote on Twitter that Faurisson would be one of the very few French names still talked about in 200 years' time.

In September 2020, he was jailed after having been convicted several times for anti-semitic remarks and holocaust denial, a crime in France. While he was initially sentenced to a year in prison, the sentence was later reduced on appeal to four months, meaning that he was eligible for house arrest while having to wear an electronic ankle monitor.

== Theories ==
In his book, Psychoanalysis of Judaism, Ryssen compares Judaism to a hysterical pathology, and believes that Judaism results in anxiety, paranoia, depression, amnesia, sexual misconduct, incest, identity disorder. He believes that the unity between Jewish forces across the globe comes from their universal belief in the Jewish Messiah and communism and racial interbreeding will be two facets of this Messiah.

== Publications ==
=== Books ===
- Planetary Hopes, Levallois-Perret, ed. Baskerville, 2005, 430 p., 22 cm ( ISBN 2-9524559-0-2, BnF record no . FRBNF40037166 )
- Psychoanalysis of Judaism, Levallois-Perret, ed. Baskerville, 2006, 397 p., 22 cm ( ISBN 978-2-9524559-5-4, BnF record no . FRBNF40187707 )
- Jewish Fanaticism: Equality – Human Rights – Tolerance, Levallois-Perret, ed. Baskerville, 2007, 395 p., 22 cm ( ISBN 978-2-9524559-1-6, BnF record no . FRBNF41075206 )
- The Jewish Mafia: The Great International Predators, Levallois-Perret, ed. Baskerville, 2008, 395 p., 22 cm ( ISBN 978-2-9524559-2-3, BnF notice no . FRBNF41296945 )- translated into English
- The Mirror of Judaism: The Accusatory Inversion, Levallois-Perret, ed. Baskerville, 2009, 397 p., 22 cm ( ISBN 978-2-9524559-7-8, BnF record no . FRBNF41442426 )
- History of anti-Semitism: seen by a goy and returned to the place, Levallois-Perret, ed. Baskerville,2010, 432 p., 22 cm ( ISBN 978-2-9524559-3-0, BnF notice no . FRBNF42408430 )
- Anti-white Racism: Assassins of white men – Killers, rapists of white women, Levallois-Perret, ed. Baskerville,2011, 320 p., not known ( ISBN 978-2-9524559-8-5 )Bibliographic notice apparently absent from the General Catalog of the National Library of France.
- Understanding Judaism, Understanding Anti-Semitism, Levallois-Perret, ed. Baskerville,2012, 144 p., 15 cm ( ISBN 979-10-91246-00-2, BnF notice no . FRBNF43613000 )
- The Eschatological War: The End of Times in the Great Religions, Levallois-Perret, ed. Baskerville,2013, 185 p., 22 cm ( ISBN 979-10-91246-01-9, BnF record no . FRBNF43613003 )
- Israel's Billions: Jewish Swindlers & International Financiers, ed. Baskerville,2014, 330 p., 22 cm ( ISBN 979-10-91246-02-6, BnF notice no . FRBNF43899584 )
- Satan in Hollywood, ed. Baskerville,2015
- Anti-Semitism, without complex or taboo: Plea for freedom of expression, ed. Baskerville,2018, 272 p..

=== Documentaries ===
- Satan in Hollywood (2015)
- Jews and Incest (2016)
- Jews, Communism and the Russian Revolution of 1917 (2017)
- Jews and World Unification (2017)
- Anti-Semitism for Dummies (2017)
- The Sephardic Connection (2017)
- The Jewish Mafia (2017)
- Why Anti-Semitism (2020)
