= Murder of Idy Diene =

2018 murder in Italy

- Location: Florence, Tuscany, Italy
- Date: 5 March 2018; 9:00 PM (Central European Time)
- Target: Senegalese market trader
- Attack type: Murder by shooting
- Victim: Idy Diene
- Perpetrator: Roberto Pirrone
- Motive: Undetermined

On 5 March 2018, Idy Diene, a 54-year-old Senegalese immigrant, was fatally shot near the central Ponte Amerigo Vespucci in Florence, Italy. The shooter, who was identified as Roberto Pirrone, turned himself in to the police. While the police have deemed that the shooting was not racially or politically motivated, local African immigrant communities have held protests, citing the murder as prejudiced.

== Timeline ==
On the morning of 5 March 2018, Roberto Pirrone left his house with a gun, intending to kill himself. He then changed his mind and decided to shoot anyone he encountered, believing that he would not be a burden to his family in prison. After attempting suicide, he pointed his gun at a mother with a child, but decided not to shoot them. He then saw Idy Diene, a Senegalese trader, and shot him three times in quick succession. Pirrone then turned himself in to the police. A medical team managed to revive the victim, who died forty minutes later. The crime scene was cordoned off by the police.

== Suspect ==
Pirrone explained to the police that he wanted to kill himself for economic reasons while breaking into tears. A farewell note to his daughter was found in his home in the Oltrarno district not far from the bridge. The police confirmed that there was no racist intent in the perpetrated murder. Pirrone was an arms collector and leftist militant. During a search of his house, the Italian police discovered numerous weapons and relics of the former Soviet Union.

== Reactions ==
The Senegalese community in Florence protested against the shooting, believing that it was racially motivated. A group of Senegalese immigrants went to the Florentine town hall to confront the mayor of Florence, Dario Nardella. The police intervened in riot gear to contain the protest. The mayor condemned the murder and extended the support of the city to the victim's family and the broader Senegalese community. He further condemned the violence and rioting. The mayor participated in the anti-racist demonstration that took place in Florence on 10 March 2018 and visited the scene of the murder, where he was confronted by a group of protesters.

== See also ==
- Racism in Italy
- 2011 Florence shootings
