= Yvan Benedetti =

French nationalist activist

- Born: 16 September 1965 (age 60); La Réunion
- Occupation: Political activist

Yvan Benedetti (born 16 September 1965) is a French far-right activist. The former president of L'Œuvre Française (2012–13), he has been the spokesman of The Nationalists since 2015.

== Biography ==
=== Early life ===
Yvan Benedetti was born on 16 September 1965 in La Réunion, from a Corsican father. During his youth, he attended a technical high school and was a member of the Nouvelle Droite scouting organization Europe-Jeunesse.

=== L'Œuvre Française ===
In the 1990s-2000s, he was the right-hand-man of Pierre Sidos, the founder and leader of L'Œuvre Française (also known as L'Œuvre). After negotiations with Sidos, Jean-Marie Le Pen allowed some L'Œuvre militants, notably Benedetti, to integrate the FN in 2007. In 2011, he directed the electoral campaign of Bruno Gollnisch for the presidency of the FN.

Benedetti was however expelled from the party in 2011 after he defined himself as an "anti-Zionist, anti-Semite, anti-Jews" in an interview. Benedetti, along with nationalist activist Alexandre Gabriac, decided to establish "Jeunesses Nationalistes" in 2011 as the youth movement and activist branch of L'Œuvre Française, in order to attract militants disappointed by the new FN leadership. The following year, Pierre Sidos, then 85, left the presidency of L'Œuvre after 44 years in office, succeeded by Benedetti.

L'Œuvre Française was dissolved on 23 July 2013 after the issue of an official decree by the then Minister of the Interior, Manuel Valls. The ban occurred in a context of street violence by far-right revolutionary groups, and followed the death of a far-left activist in a fight involving another nationalist association led by Serge Ayoub. Valls justified the dissolution by denouncing L'Œuvre as a group "organized like a private militia thanks to paramilitary-like training camps." He further added that the association had been "spreading a xenophobic and antisemitic ideology, diffusing racist and Holocaust-denying thesis, exalting collaboration [with the Nazis] and the Vichy regime, paying regular tribute to Pétain, Brasillach or Maurras".

=== French Nationalist Party ===
In 2014, Benedetti and Gabriac ran in the municipal elections of Vénissieux, in the outskirts of Lyon, inviting electors to "slip a quenelle" inside the ballot box. They obtained, with 11.5% of the votes, seats in the city council. The ballot initiated by the two FN dissidents was called "Vénissieux Fait Front" and featured most of the candidates that had run for the FN during the previous election, which led Marine Le Pen to denounce Benedetti and Gabriac as "parasites" and to call for the invalidation of their candidacy. The vote was eventually declared void a few months later by the Conseil d'État due to irregularities in the list of candidates.

In September 2015, Benedetti appealed to join the French Nationalist Party, of which he is the spokesman. The movement had been established back in 1983 and re-activated earlier in 2015 to cope with the dissolution of several far-right groups in 2013.

After the death of Robert Faurisson in October 2018, he described the Holocaust denier as a "modern-day herald who marked the second half of the 20th century."

In late 2018, he participated in the Yellow Vest movement; his presence was noticed by the media due to an altercation with a team of journalists.

In October 2019, he bullied journalists during an anti-ART march in Paris to prevent them from interviewing demonstrators, and participated in the degradation of their equipment, including a camera.

In 2022, Benedetti tried with no success to run as candidate for the 2022 French presidential election.

During the Russian invasion of Ukraine in 2022, Benedetti supported the Russian side and blamed NATO's responsibility in the conflict.

== Convictions ==
In June 2019, Yvan Benedetti was convicted to a suspended 8 months jail sentence for "recreating a disbanded league", L'Œuvre having kept on operating for several months following the dissolution.

He was convicted in June 2021 for publishing on his website a video entitled "Jews, incest and hysteria" in which members of the Jewish community were described, according to the court, as being "as a whole, by virtue of their 'uniqueness', naturally incestuous, more so than any other community".

In September 2022, he was fined 10,000 euros for denying the existence of a crime against humanity, because of an article minimising the number of deaths in the Holocaust.
