= CasaPound =

Italian neo-fascist organization founded in 2003

CasaPound CasaPound Italia – CPI
- Abbreviation: CPI
- President: Gianluca Iannone
- Founded: 26 December 2003; 22 years ago
- Split from: Tricolour Flame
- Youth wing: Students' Block
- Membership (2017): 6,000 - 20,000
- Ideology: Neo-fascism
- Political position: Far-right

Party flag

Website
- www.casapounditalia.org

CasaPound Italia (CPI; "House of [Ezra] Pound"), officially CasaPound Italia – CPI, is an Italian neo-fascist movement. It was formerly a political party, born as a network of far-right social centres arising from the occupation of a state-owned building by squatters in the neighborhood of Esquilino in Rome on 26 December 2003. Subsequently, CasaPound spread with other instances of squatting, demonstrations and various initiatives, becoming a political movement. In June 2008, CasaPound established its own association. In June 2019, CasaPound announced that it no longer was a political party and promoted itself as a social movement.

== History ==
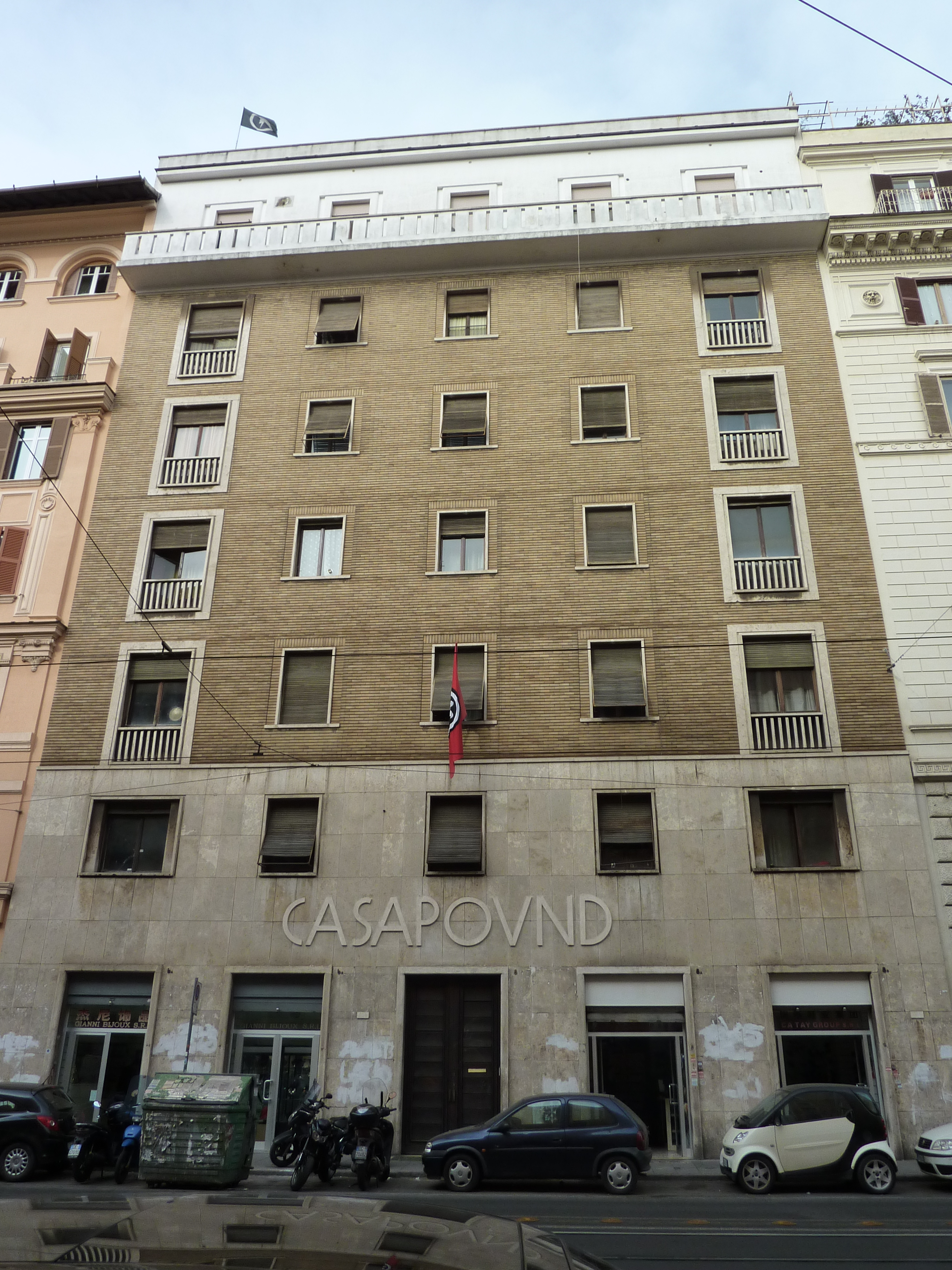
CasaPound building in via Napoleone III, Rome, 2010

The first occupation made using the name CasaPound was in Rome on 26 December 2003. It was done by a group of young people referring to the ONC/OSA area (an acronym for Occupazioni Non Conformi and Occupazioni a Scopo Abitativo, meaning "Non-Compliant Occupations and Occupations with a Housing Purpose"), and came from previous experience of CasaMontag (named after Guy Montag) at the gates of Rome. The building, a state-owned building via Napoleone III, was later used as the national headquarters of the movement and the association. By 2010, 23 families and a total of 82 people were living in CasaPound-occupied building. In June 2008, CasaPound constituted an "association of social promotion"; the party's symbol is the "Arrowed Turtle". Previously, CasaPound was associated with Tricolour Flame until 2008, before it created its own movement, CasaPound Italy, extending all over Italy with many social centres. While CPI does not recognize the classic definitions of right and left, it is commonly placed in the category of the political groups and movements of the Italian radical right. CasaPound is generally self-defined by its followers as Third Position. In 2011, it was estimated that CasaPound Italy had 5,000 members, while in 2017 estimates ranged from 6,000 to 20,000 members. Starting with the 2011 Italian local elections, CasaPound presented its candidates in local elections in civic lists or centre-right coalition and succeeded in electing representatives. At the 2013 Italian regional and general elections, CasaPound Italy announced that it would present its civic lists throughout Italy, and made inroads by 2017. On 13 November 2017, Simone Di Stefano was elected secretary and nominal prime ministerial candidate for the 2018 Italian general election, although the party subsequently formally stated that it hoped that League leader Matteo Salvini would become the prime minister. To participate in the 2019 European Parliament election in Italy, an electoral joint list was formed by CasaPound together with United Right. Di Stefano topped the coalition's list but the coalition was unable to win any seats in the European Parliament. On 26 June 2019, CasaPound's president Gianluca Iannone announced that CasaPound's existence as a political party had ended, going back to its original status as a social movement. During the 2022 Italian general election, CasaPound supported Italexit, which had a candidate list that included CasaPound members.

== Ideology ==
CasaPound is described as neo-fascist, and thus as far-right, representing extremist Italian nationalism, hard Euroscepticism, and souverainism. It claims opposition to capitalism, and also supports laicism. According to sociologist Emanuele Toscano, one feature of this movement is to present a different interpretation of fascism aimed at overcoming the dichotomy of left–right political spectrum. The political position of CasaPound is based on the fascist Third Position, defined as "extreme-upper-centre" by the movement itself. The name, inspired by the American poet Ezra Pound, refers to his Cantos against usury, criticisms of the economic positions of both capitalism and Marxism, and his cooperation (Ezra Pound's radio broadcasts, 1941–1945) with the Italian Social Republic. It also gives particular attention to the Manifest of Verona, the Labour Charter of 1927 and the social legislation of Italian fascism. There has been collaboration with the identitarian movement, which propagates a white Christian Europe. The movement also praises the legacy of left-wing figures, such as Hugo Chávez and Che Guevara. On social and domestic issues, CasaPound has a strong anti-immigration stance; it lacks homogeneity on other themes. In January 2016, many members of the movement participated in Family Day, supporting the traditional family idea. In 2017, the establishment of CasaPound expressed support for same-sex civil unions, advance directives, and improvement of the welfare state. The party supports abortion-rights. Some activists of the movement expressed antisemitic and xenophobic rhetoric online; CasaPound claims to refuse and expel members who support these ideas. Along with other Italian neo-fascist and far-right organizations, CasaPound supports remigration.

=== Foreign policy ===
On foreign policy, CasaPound is critical of the European Union, instead supporting a communitarian-nationalist Europe. The movement was originally anti-American, as well as anti-Zionist, and started a cooperation with the Lebanese anti-imperialist, anti-Zionist, and Shia Islamist party Hezbollah in 2015; however, Di Stefano later said: "We do not have problems with Israel." In 2018, Di Stefano defended Israeli prime minister Benjamin Netanyahu's policies regarding the repatriation of illegal immigrants to Africa as "undoubtedly excellent", and criticised humanitarian organisations and the United Nations for intervening to prevent them. After the end of Di Stefano's leadership, CasaPound reverted to a strongly pro-Palestine stance in the Israeli-Palestinian conflict. Di Stefano expressed support for U.S. president Donald Trump but requested that he close U.S. military bases in Italy. Although Di Stefano maintained outspoken support for Russian president Vladimir Putin, CasaPound under his leadership always took a pro-Ukraine stance, being closely linked with the far-right nationalist organisation Right Sector, with members fighting among the ranks of the Azov Battalion and Misanthropic Division. This positioned the organisation as opposed to its neo-fascist rival New Force (a former Italian ally of the ultranationalist party Svoboda), which since 2014 took a pro-Russian stance in the Russo-Ukrainian war and sent fighters to Donbas. According to the Italian edition of the HuffPost, members of CasaPound went to fight in Ukraine, among them Francesco Saverio Fontana, who enlisted in the Azov Battalion.

== Activities ==
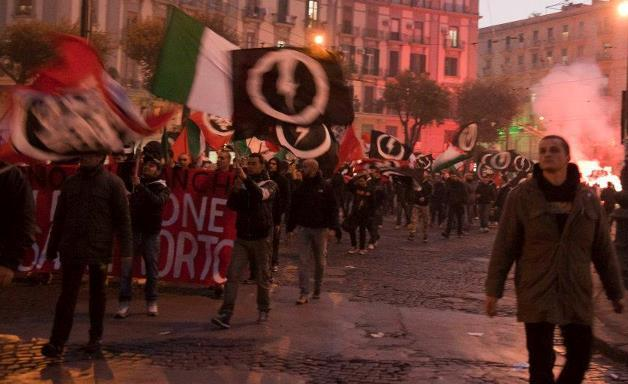
CasaPound rally in Naples

The social centre has its musical band (Zetazeroalfa), an association of civil protection, and promotes sports (hiking, parachuting, diving, and other disciplines), union activities, and recreational activities, including a theater company, web radio, web television, and a monthly magazine. CasaPound has promoted initiatives outside the Italian territory through its non-profit organisation Solidarité Identités. The activities of the movement have been the subject of attention by some foreign media. From the period of activity of the first social centre then were organized and cultural meetings with several guests, including writer Nicolai Lilin, the LGBT deputy Paola Concia, ex-Red Brigades member Valerio Morucci, and the Chinese community. The main CasaPound political proposal is the Social Mortgage (Mutuo Sociale), as a response to the problem of housing that according to official data involving approximately 23,000 households throughout Italy. In October 2011, the Lazio region led by Renata Polverini of The People of Freedom (PdL) officially approved it within its "House Plan" (Piano Casa).

== Blocco Studentesco ==
Logo of Blocco Studentesco, the youth wing of CasaPound

CasaPound's student organisation Blocco Studentesco (Students' Bloc) was founded in 2006. Aside from being a place for interested people to find others with similar political views it also takes part in student elections. In 2009, it successfully entered the student parliaments with 100 representatives. Its logo is based on the flag of the British Union of Fascists founded by Oswald Mosley in the 1930s. Blocco Studentesco's main forms of action are demonstrations and parades. Events such as flash mobs, hard bass, and happenings are also organized and used for content production on social media. Some of the direct actions Blocco Studentesco takes part in are violent. In 2008, there was a fight between the student organisation and left-wing students in Piazza Navona in Rome. In April 2010, questions were submitted by parliamentarians of the Democratic Party (PD) about fascist propaganda and the violence of the student movement. In October 2023, Blocco Studentesco protested an event in Rome attended by the Likud, the Republican Party, the National Rally, Fidesz, and Alternative for Germany, calling for the liberation of Palestine, the Golan Heights and the Republic of Artsakh, and condemning the parties in attendance as "pro-Russian and anti-European".

== International meetings ==
Over the years the leaders of CasaPound Italy have been invited to explain its "political model" in many of the major European capitals (Paris, Madrid, London, Lisbon, Brussels, and Warsaw), and the organisation has been the subject of some reports by foreign media. In 2011, the Finnish Resistance Movement also invited members of CasaPound to a seminar in Helsinki. The Finnish Resistance Movement represents neo-Nazism. The Finnish Security Intelligence Service researched the connections of the Finnish Resistance Movement to CasaPound after the 2011 Florence shootings.

== Symbolic figures ==
The party's choice of Pound as a symbol of the movement caused controversy with his daughter Mary de Rachewiltz who claimed, despite Pound's stated support for fascism, that it distorts the meaning of Pound's work and represents a "misappropriation" of his image.

== Electoral results ==
=== Italian Parliament ===
Election	Leader	Chamber of Deputies				Senate of the Republic			
Election	Leader	Votes	%	Seats	+/–	Votes	%	Seats	+/–
2013	Gianluca Iannone	47,691 (20th)	0.14	0 / 630	New	40,540 (20th)	0.13	0 / 315	New
2018	Simone Di Stefano	312,432 (10th)	0.95	0 / 630	0	259,718 (10th)	0.86	0 / 315	0

=== European Parliament ===
Election	Leader	Votes	%	Seats	+/–	EP Group
2019	Simone Di Stefano	89,142	0.33	0 / 76	New	–

=== Regional or Provincial Councils ===
Region	Election year	Votes	%	Seats	+/–
Lombardy	2018	45,416	0.86	0 / 80	–
Umbria	2015	2,343	0.66	0 / 20	–
Lazio	2013	18,491	0.66	0 / 50	–
Lazio	2018	42,609	1.68	0 / 50	–
Abruzzo	2019	2,974	0.47	0 / 31	–
Molise	2018	477	0.33	0 / 21	–
South Tyrol	2018	2,451	0.86	0 / 35	–
Trentino	2018	1,215	0.48	0 / 35	–

== See also ==
- Far-right social centre
- National Fascist Party
- Social Bastion
