= Social Bastion =

French neo-fascist movement

- Bastion Social
- Predecessor: Groupe Union Défense
- Formation: June 2017; 8 years ago
- Founder: Steven Bissuel
- Dissolved: April 24, 2019; 6 years ago
- Headquarters: Lyon
- Leader: Valentin Linder

Social Bastion (French: Bastion Social) was a French political movement founded in 2017 by former members of the far-right student association Groupe Union Défense (GUD) and dissolved by official decree in 2019 after several racially motivated attacks committed by its members. The movement advocated nativism and remigration.

Inspired by the Italian movement CasaPound, with which they maintained ties, Social Bastion used similar political actions such as squatting, demonstrations, and humanitarian aid restricted to white homeless people. The group was also close to the Belgian Nation Movement and the Swiss Résistance Helvétique.

== History ==
Social Bastion was founded in 2017 by Steven Bissuel, a former president of the GUD in Lyon, and later spread to other French cities such as Chambéry, Strasbourg, Aix-en-Provence, Clermont-Ferrand and Marseille. Valentin Linder became its new leader in 2018.

Social Bastion was banned by the French government on 24 April 2019, along with six other far-right groups, due to the involvement of several of its members in acts of violence. Despite this, the movement has survived under different structures, growing from 6 to 15 local branches. As of November 2020, legal proceedings are under way for "reconstitution of a disbanded group".

== Convictions ==
On 12 December 2017, a leader of the Strasburg branch of Bastion Social was convicted to 8 months in prison for the assault of a young man of Algerian origin. On 27 June 2018, two founding members of the Marseille branch were convicted to 6 months in prison for the aggression of an off-duty gendarme and a Black Guadeloupean man. In October 2018, a member of the Clermont-Ferrand branch was convicted to 1 year in prison for two racially motivated attacks.

== See also ==
- Far-right social centres
